= Baron Londesborough =

Title in English peerage

- Blazon: Arms: Quarterly: 1st and 4th, Ermine a Bend Azure cotised Sable between an Unicorn's Head erased in chief Argent and a Cross Crosslet fitche in base Gules (Denison); 2nd and 3rd, Argent a Shake-Fork between three Mullets one and two Sable (Conyngham).; Crests: 1st: issuant from Clouds a Dexter Arm in bend proper vested Gules cuffed Ermine and charged with a Covered Cup Or pointing with the forefinger to an Estoile radiated Gold (Denison); 2nd: An Unicorn's Head erased Argent armed and maned Or (Conyngham).; Supporters: Dexter: a Horse Argent maned unguled and charged on the shoulder with an Eagle displayed Or, with a Crescent Sable for difference; Sinister: a Stag Argent attired unguled and charged on the shoulder with a Griffin's Head erased Or, with a Crescent Sable for difference
- Creation date: 4 March 1850
- Created by: Queen Victoria
- Peerage: Peerage of the United Kingdom
- First holder: Albert Denison Denison, 1st Baron Londesborough
- Present holder: Richard John Denison, 9th Baron Londesborough
- Heir apparent: the Hon. James Frederick Denison
- Status: Extant
- Motto: ADVERSA VIRTUTE REPELLO (I repel adversity with courage)

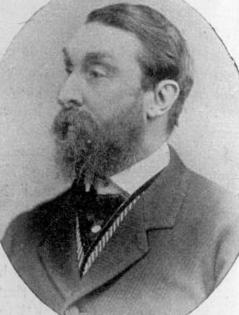
William Denison, 1st Earl of Londesborough

Baron Londesborough, of Londesborough in the East Riding of the County of York, is a title in the Peerage of the United Kingdom. It was created in 1850 for the diplomat and Whig politician Lord Albert Denison. He was the third son of Henry Conyngham, 1st Marquess Conyngham, and his wife Elizabeth Denison. Born Albert Denison Conyngham, he assumed by royal licence the surname of Denison in lieu of Conyngham in 1849 on inheriting the vast fortune of his maternal uncle William Joseph Denison (1770–1849). Before his elevation to the peerage, Denison had represented Canterbury in Parliament. His eldest son, the second Baron, sat as a Liberal Member of Parliament for Beverley and Scarborough. In 1887 he was created Viscount Raincliffe, of Raincliffe in the North Riding of the County of York, and Earl of Londesborough, in the County of York. These titles were also in the Peerage of the United Kingdom. However, the viscountcy and the earldom became extinct on the death of his grandson, the fourth Earl, in 1937.

The barony was inherited by the late Earl's second cousin once removed, the sixth Baron. He was the son of Rear-Admiral the Hon. Albert Denison, second son of the first Baron. On his death this line of the family failed, and the title passed to his first cousin, the seventh Baron. He was the only son of Commander the Hon. Conyngham Albert Denison, fourth son of the first Baron. When he died this line of the family also failed. He was succeeded by his first cousin, the eighth Baron. He was the only son of the Hon. Harold Albert Denison, fifth son of the first Baron. As of 2013, the title is held by his only son, the ninth Baron, who succeeded in 1968. As a male-line descendant of the first Marquess Conyngham, he is also in remainder to this peerage and its subsidiary titles.

== Baron Londesborough (1850) ==
- Albert Denison Denison, 1st Baron Londesborough (1805–1860)
- William Henry Forester Denison, 2nd Baron Londesborough (1834–1900) (created Earl of Londesborough in 1887)

=== Earl of Londesborough (1887) ===
- William Henry Forester Denison, 1st Earl of Londesborough (1834–1900).
- William Francis Henry Denison, 2nd Earl of Londesborough (1864–1917). Married Grace Augusta Fane, daughter of the 12th Earl of Westmorland on 11 August 1887. Father of Irene Mountbatten, Marchioness of Carisbrooke.
- George Francis William Henry Denison, 3rd Earl of Londesborough (1892–1920).
- Hugo William Cecil Denison, 4th Earl of Londesborough (1894–1937). Married Marigold Lubbock, daughter of Edgar Lubbock, brewer and banker, in 1935.

=== Baron Londesborough (1850; reverted) ===
- Captain Ernest William Denison, MBE, 6th Baron Londesborough (1876–1963).
- Captain Conyngham Charles Denison, DSO, 7th Baron Londesborough (1885–1967).
- John Albert Lister Denison, 8th Baron Londesborough (1901–1968).
- Richard John Denison, 9th Baron Londesborough (born 1959). Elected to the House of Lords in 2021.

The heir apparent and sole heir to the barony is the present holder's only son, Hon. James Frederick Denison (born 1990).

== Family tree ==
Family tree of the Marquesses Conyngham and Barons Londesborough

Alexander Cunningham d. 1660; Dean of Raphoe
Albert Cunningham d. 1691
Henry Conyngham before 1681–1706
Baron Conyngham (1st creation), 1753; Viscount Conyngham, 1756; Earl Conyngham and Baron Conyngham (2nd creation), 1781
Henry Conyngham; 1705–1781; Earl Conyngham, etc. | Mary Conyngham | Francis Burton; 1696–1744
Earl Conyngham, Viscount Conyngham, and Baron Conyngham (1st creation) extinct, 1781 and barony Conyngham (2nd creation) passed to nephew Francis Conyngham
Francis Pierpoint (Né Burton) Conyngham c. 1725–1787; 2nd Baron Conyngham | William Burton Conyngham; 1733–1796
Viscount Conyngham, 1789; Earl Conyngham and Viscount Mount Charles, 1797; Marquess Conyngham, Earl of Mount Charles, Viscount Slane, 1816; Baron Minster, 1821
Henry Burton Conyngham; 1766–1832; 1st Marquess Conyngham, etc., 3rd Baron Conyngham | Francis Nathaniel Pierpoint Burton; 1766–1832
Baron Londesborough, 1850
Henry Conyngham; 1795–1824 styled Earl of Mount Charles | Francis Nathaniel Conyngham; 1797–1876; 2nd Marquess Conyngham, etc., 4th Baron Conyngham | Albert Denison (né Conyngham) Denison; 1805–1860; 1st Baron Londesborough
Earl of Londesborough and Viscount Raincliffe, 1887
George Henry Conyngham; 1825–1882; 3rd Marquess Conyngham, etc., 5th Baron Conyngham | Jane Conyngham; 1826–1900 | Frances Caroline Martha Conyngham; 1827–1898 | Francis Nathaniel Conyngham; 1832–1880 | William Denison, 1st Earl of Londesborough; 1st Earl of Londesborough, etc., 2nd Baron Londesborough; 1834–1900 | Albert Denison Somerville Denison; 1836–1903 | Henry Denison; 1849–1936 | Conyngham Denison; 1851–1938 | Harold Albert Denison; 1856–1848
Henry Francis Conyngham; 1857–1897; 4th Marquess Conyngham, etc., 6th Baron Conyngham | Jane Seymour Conyngham; 1860–1941 | Violet Anne Blanche Lambart | William Francis Henry Denison; 1864–1917; 2nd Earl of Londesborough, etc., 3rd Baron Londesborough | Ernest William Denison; 1876–1963; 6th Baron Londesborough
Victor George Henry Francis Conyngham; 1883–1918; 5th Marquess Conyngham, etc., 7th Baron Conyngham | Frederick William Burton Conyngham; 1890–1974; 6th Marquess Conyngham, etc., 8th Baron Conyngham | Winifred Phyllis Seymour | Robert Lambart Dunville | George Francis William Henry Denison; 1892–1920; 3rd Earl of Londesborough, etc., 4th Baron Londesborough | Hugo William Cecil Denison; 1894–1937; 4th Earl of Londesborough, etc., 5th Baron Londesborough | Edward Denison; 1888–1960 | Conyngham Charles Denison; 1885–1967; 7th Baron Londesborough | Gerald Denison; 1892–1915 | John Albert Lister Denison; 1901–1968; 8th Baron Londesborough
Earldom of Londesborough and viscountcy Raincliffe extinct, 1937
Frederick William Henry Francis Conyngham; 1924–2009; 7th Marquess Conyngham, etc., 9th Baron Conyngham | Philip Denison; 1919–1945
Baron Londesborough of Richmond Hill, 2026
Henry Vivien Pierpont Conyngham; 1951–2025; 8th Marquess Conyngham, etc., 10th Baron Conyngham | Richard Denison b. 1959; 9th Baron Londesborough, Baron Londesborough of Richmond Hill
Baron Londesborough of Richmond Hill is a life peerage
Alexander Burton Conyngham b. 1975; 9th Marquess Conyngham, etc., 11th Baron Conyngham | James Denison b. 1990
Heir apparent to the Barony Londesborough
Rory Nicholas Burton Conyngham b. 2010 styled Earl of Mount Charles
Heir apparent to the Conyngham Marquessate

== See also ==
- Marquess Conyngham
