= Henry Conyngham =

Henry Conyngham may refer to:

- Henry Conyngham (soldier) (pre-1681–c. 1705), soldier and politician
- Henry Conyngham, 1st Earl Conyngham (1705–1781), British nobleman and politician
- Henry Conyngham, 1st Marquess Conyngham (1766–1832), politician of the Regency period
- Henry Francis Conyngham, Earl of Mount Charles (1795–1824), Irish Tory politician
- Henry Conyngham, 4th Marquess Conyngham (1857–1897)
- Henry Conyngham, 8th Marquess Conyngham (born 1951), Irish peer and politician
