= Francis Conyngham =

Francis Conyngham may refer to:

- Francis Conyngham, 2nd Baron Conyngham (d. 1787), Anglo-Irish peer, MP
- Francis Conyngham, 2nd Marquess Conyngham (1797–1867), Anglo-Irish peer, politician, grandson of the above
- Lord Francis Conyngham (1832–1880), MP, son of the above
