= Lord Londesborough =

Lord Londesborough may refer to:

- Albert Denison, 1st Baron Londesborough (1805–1860), British politician and diplomat
- His son William Denison, 1st Earl of Londesborough (1834–1900), known as the Lord Londesborough 1860–1887, British peer and Liberal politician
- Baron Londesborough contains a fuller list of people
