= Marquess Conyngham =

Title in the peerage of Ireland

Marquessate of Conyngham
- Arms: Argent, a Shake-Fork between three Mullets, all Sable. Crest: A Unicorn's Head erased Argent, armed and maned Or. Supporters: Dexter:A Horse Argent, maned tufted and charged on the breast with an Eagle displayed Or. Sinister: A Buck proper, attired unguled and charged on the breast with a Griffin's Head erased Or.
- Creation date: 17 July 1816
- Created by: The Prince Regent (acting on behalf of his father George III)
- Peerage: Peerage of Ireland
- First holder: Henry Conyngham, 1st Earl Conyngham
- Present holder: Alexander Burton Conyngham, 9th Marquess Conyngham
- Heir apparent: Rory Nicholas Burton Conyngham, Earl of Mount Charles
- Remainder to: The 1st Marquess' heirs male of the body lawfully begotten
- Subsidiary titles: Earl Conyngham; Earl of Mount Charles; Viscount Conyngham; Viscount Mount Charles; Viscount Slane; Baron Minster (United Kingdom)
- Seat: Slane Castle
- Former seats: The Hall, Mountcharles
- Motto: OVER FORK OVER

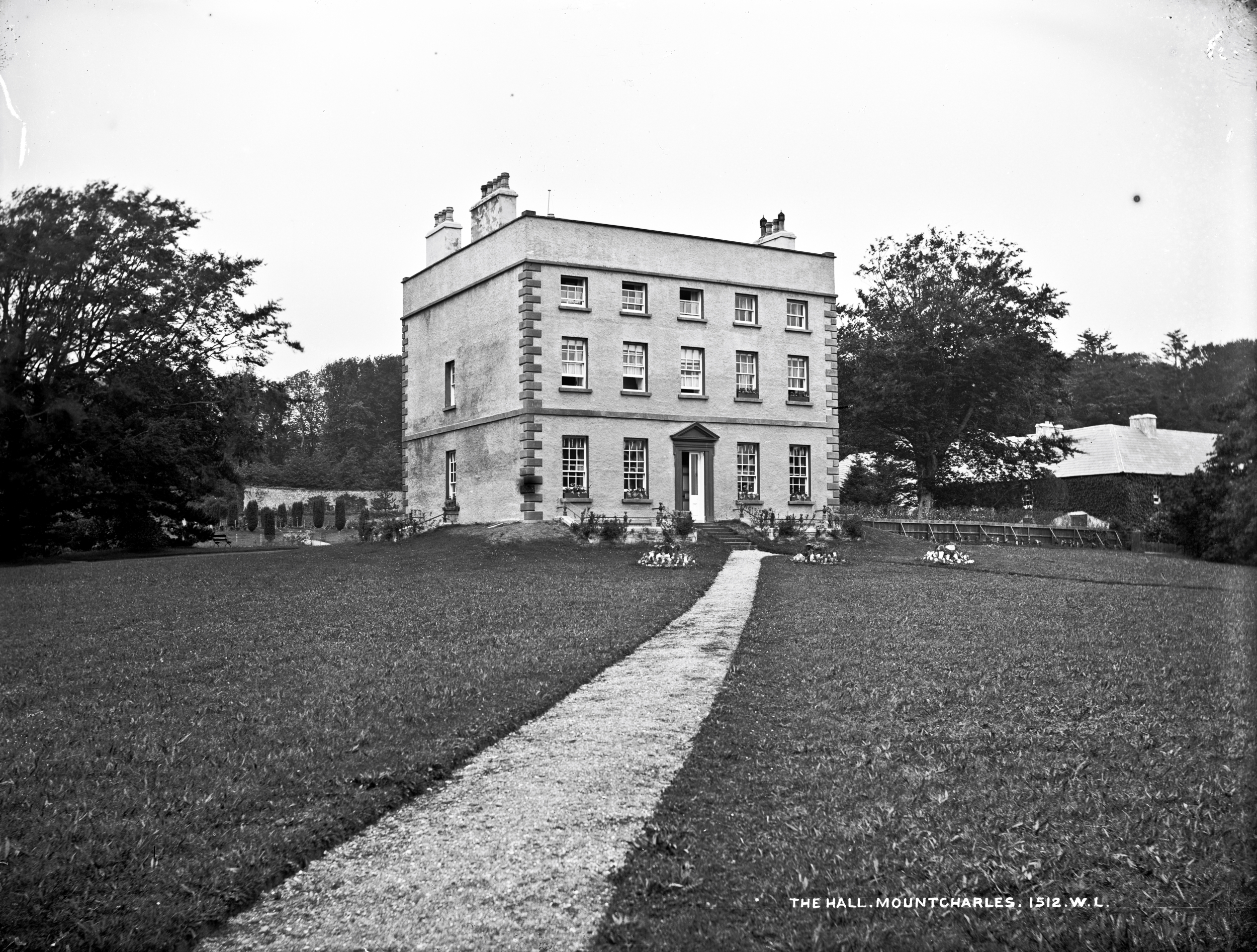
The Hall, Mountcharles

Marquess Conyngham, of the County of Donegal, is a title in the Peerage of Ireland.

The title was created in 1816 for Henry Conyngham, 1st Earl Conyngham. He was the great-nephew of another Henry Conyngham, 1st Earl Conyngham, a member of a family of Scottish descent which had settled during the Plantation of Ulster in County Donegal in Ireland in the early 17th century. The 'founder' of the dynasty in Ireland was The Very Rev. Dr. Alexander Cunningham, Dean of Raphoe. The earlier Henry was a member of both the Irish House of Commons and the British House of Commons and served as Vice-Admiral of Ulster and as Governor of the counties of Donegal and Londonderry. In 1753 he was raised to the Peerage of Ireland as Baron Conyngham, of Mount Charles in the County of Donegal, and in 1756 he was created Viscount Conyngham, in Ireland, also in the Peerage of Ireland. In 1781 he was made Baron Conyngham, of Mount Charles in the County of Donegal, with remainder to his nephew Francis Burton, and Earl Conyngham, of Mount Charles in the County of Donegal, which like the creations of 1753 and 1756 was created with normal remainder to the heirs male of his body. The latter titles were also in the Peerage of Ireland. Lord Conyngham was childless and on his death in 1781 the barony of 1753, the viscountcy and earldom became extinct while he was succeeded in the barony of 1781 according to the special remainder by his aforementioned nephew Francis. He was the eldest son of Mary, sister of the first Earl Conyngham, by her husband Francis Burton. The new 2nd Baron Conyngham, who had earlier represented Killybegs and County Clare in the Irish House of Commons, assumed by Royal licence the surname and arms of Conyngham on succeeding to the titles.

The 2nd Baron Conyngham was succeeded by his eldest twin son, Henry, the third Baron. He was a General in the British Army, one of the original 28 Irish representative peer, Governor of both County Donegal and County Clare and Lord Steward of the Household. He was created Viscount Conyngham, of Mount Charles in the County of Donegal, in 1789, Viscount Mount Charles and Earl Conyngham in 1797, and Viscount Slane, in the County of Meath, Earl of Mount Charles and Marquess Conyngham, of the County of Donegal, in 1816. All these titles were in the Peerage of Ireland. In 1821 he was also made Baron Minster, of Minster Abbey in the County of Kent, in the Peerage of the United Kingdom, which gave him an automatic seat in the House of Lords. He was succeeded by his second but eldest surviving son, Francis, the second Marquess. Like his father he was a General in the Army and also held government office as Postmaster General and as Lord Steward of the Household. His eldest son, George, the third Marquess, was a Lieutenant-General in the British Army. When he died the titles passed to his eldest son Henry, the fourth Marquess. He was Vice-Admiral of Ulster. Two of his sons, Victor, the fifth Marquess (who was aide-de-camp to Lieutenant General Sir John Grenfell Maxwell during World War I, and who died on 9 November 1918 in York), and Frederick, the sixth Marquess, both succeeded in the titles. Frederick's son, Frederick, succeeded him in 1974 as seventh Marquess, followed by his son Henry, the eighth Marquess, in 2009, and subsequently Henry's son, Alexander, as the ninth Marquess in June 2025.

Several other members of the Conyngham and Burton families may also be mentioned. Henry Conyngham (died 1706), father of the first Earl Conyngham (of the 1718 creation), was a Major-General in the British Army and was killed in the War of the Spanish Succession. Francis Burton (died 1743), father of the second Baron Conyngham, was a Member of the Irish Parliament for Coleraine and County Clare. William Conyngham (who assumed the surname of Conyngham in lieu of Burton in 1781), younger son of Francis Burton and younger brother of the second Baron Conyngham, was a Member of the Irish Parliament and served as a Teller of the Exchequer. The Honourable Sir Francis Burton, second son of the second Baron, was a colonial administrator and Member of Parliament for County Clare. Elizabeth Conyngham, Marchioness Conyngham, wife of the first Marquess, was a mistress of King George IV. Henry Francis Conyngham, Earl of Mount Charles, eldest son of the first Marquess, represented County Donegal in the House of Commons but predeceased his father, unmarried. Lord Albert Denison Conyngham, third son of the first Marquess, assumed the surname of Denison in lieu of Conyngham in 1849 on succeeding to the vast fortune of his maternal uncle William Joseph Denison, and was raised to the peerage as Baron Londesborough the following year (see this title for more information on this branch of the family). Lady Jane Conyngham, second daughter of the first Marquess, was a Lady of the Bedchamber to Queen Victoria. Lord Francis Conyngham, second son of the second Marquess, was Member of Parliament for County Clare.

The family seat is Slane Castle in County Meath. A former family seat was The Hall in the village of Mountcharles, near Donegal Town in the south of County Donegal. The family surname is pronounced "Cunningum".

== Baron Conyngham (1753-1781) ==
- Henry Conyngham, Baron Conyngham (created Viscount Conyngham in 1756)

== Viscount Conyngham (1756-1781) ==
also: Baron Conyngham (1753)

- Henry Conyngham, Viscount Conyngham (1705–1781) (Created Earl Conyngham and a second Baron Conyngham in 1781)

== Earl Conyngham and Baron Conyngham (1781) ==
also: Baron Conyngham (1753), Viscount Conyngham (1756)

- Henry, Earl Conyngham (1705–1781)

== Barons Conyngham (1781; Reverted) ==
- Francis Pierpoint Conyngham, 2nd Baron Conyngham, nephew of Henry Conyngham, Earl Conyngham (died 1787)
- Henry Conyngham, 3rd Baron Conyngham (1766–1832) (created Viscount Conyngham in 1789, Earl Conyngham in 1797, and Viscount Slane, Earl of Mount Charles, Marquess Conyngham in 1816 and Baron Minster in 1821)

== Marquesses Conyngham, Earls of Mount Charles, and Viscounts Slane (1816–present) ==
also: Baron Conyngham (1781), Viscount Conyngham (1789), Earl Conyngham (1797), and Baron Minster (1821)

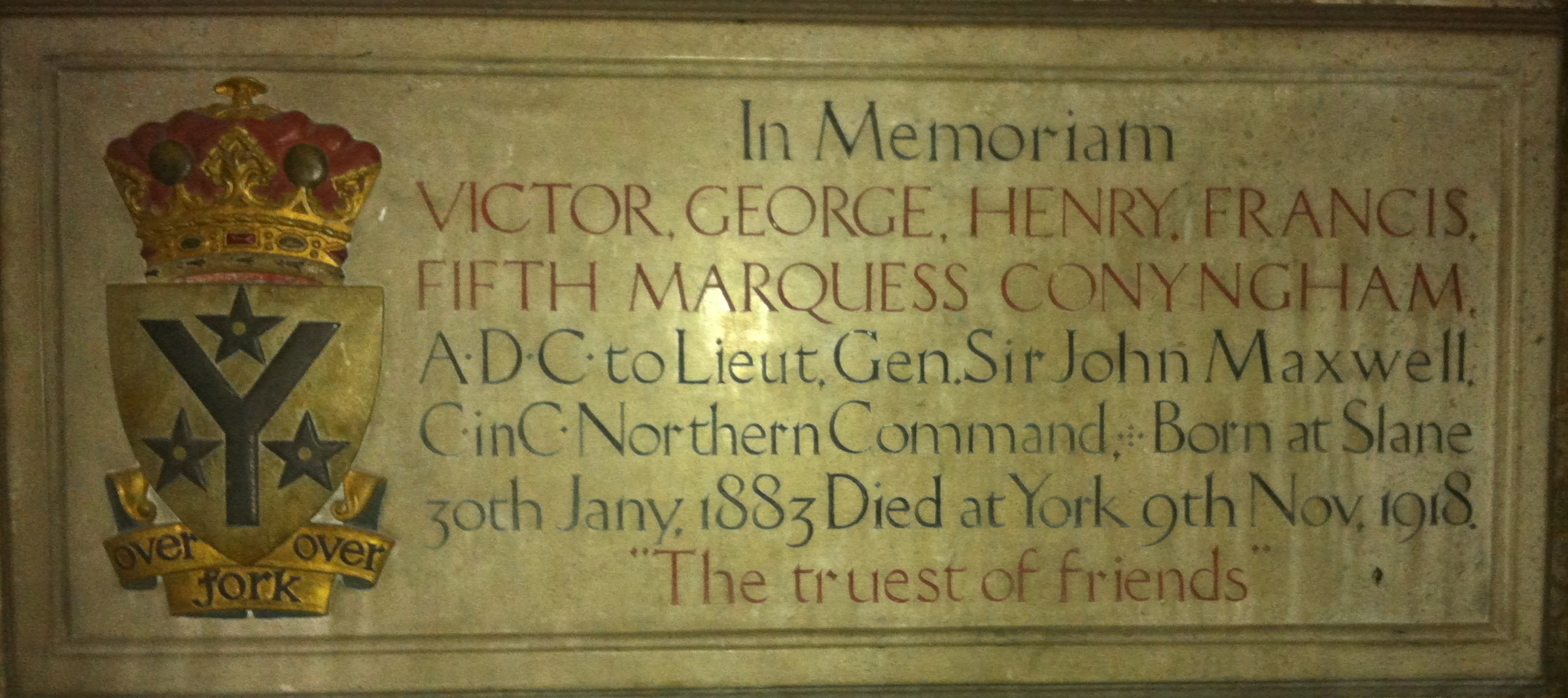
Memorial to Victor George Henry Francis, 5th Marquess Conyngham, in York Minster

- Henry Conyngham, 1st Marquess Conyngham (1766–1832)
  - Henry Francis Conyngham, Earl of Mount Charles (1795–1824)
- Francis Nathaniel Conyngham, 2nd Marquess Conyngham (1797–1876)
- George Henry Conyngham, 3rd Marquess Conyngham (1825–1882)
- Henry Francis Conyngham, 4th Marquess Conyngham (1857–1897)
- Victor George Henry Francis Conyngham, 5th Marquess Conyngham (1883–1918)
- Frederick William Burton Conyngham, 6th Marquess Conyngham (1890–1974)
- Frederick William Henry Francis Conyngham, 7th Marquess Conyngham (1924–2009)
- Henry Vivien Pierpont Conyngham, 8th Marquess Conyngham (1951−2025)
- Alexander Conyngham, 9th Marquess Conyngham (b. 1975)

== Present peer ==
Alexander Burton Conyngham, 9th Marquess Conyngham (b. 30 January 1975) is the son of Henry Vivien Pierpont Conyngham, 8th Marquess Conyngham and his wife Juliet Ann Kitson. From birth he was styled Earl of Mount Charles.

Conyngham married Carina Suzanne Bolton, daughter of Nicholas George Bolton and the Hon. Lavinia Valerie Woodhouse, daughter of David Woodhouse, 4th Baron Terrington, and they have three children:

- Laragh Conyngham (b. 2009)
- Rory Nicholas Burton Conyngham, Viscount Slane (b. 2010, the heir apparent)
- Caspar Conyngham (b. 2012)

== Family tree and line of succession ==
Family tree of the Marquesses Conyngham and Barons Londesborough

Alexander Cunningham d. 1660; Dean of Raphoe
Albert Cunningham d. 1691
Henry Conyngham before 1681–1706
Baron Conyngham (1st creation), 1753; Viscount Conyngham, 1756; Earl Conyngham and Baron Conyngham (2nd creation), 1781
Henry Conyngham; 1705–1781; Earl Conyngham, etc.	Mary Conyngham	Francis Burton; 1696–1744
Earl Conyngham, Viscount Conyngham, and Baron Conyngham (1st creation) extinct, 1781 and barony Conyngham (2nd creation) passed to nephew Francis Conyngham
Francis Pierpoint (Né Burton) Conyngham c. 1725–1787; 2nd Baron Conyngham	William Burton Conyngham; 1733–1796
Viscount Conyngham, 1789; Earl Conyngham and Viscount Mount Charles, 1797; Marquess Conyngham, Earl of Mount Charles, Viscount Slane, 1816; Baron Minster, 1821
Henry Burton Conyngham; 1766–1832; 1st Marquess Conyngham, etc., 3rd Baron Conyngham	Francis Nathaniel Pierpoint Burton; 1766–1832
Baron Londesborough, 1850
Henry Conyngham; 1795–1824 styled Earl of Mount Charles	Francis Nathaniel Conyngham; 1797–1876; 2nd Marquess Conyngham, etc., 4th Baron Conyngham	Albert Denison (né Conyngham) Denison; 1805–1860; 1st Baron Londesborough
Earl of Londesborough and Viscount Raincliffe, 1887
George Henry Conyngham; 1825–1882; 3rd Marquess Conyngham, etc., 5th Baron Conyngham	Jane Conyngham; 1826–1900	Frances Caroline Martha Conyngham; 1827–1898	Francis Nathaniel Conyngham; 1832–1880	William Denison, 1st Earl of Londesborough; 1st Earl of Londesborough, etc., 2nd Baron Londesborough; 1834–1900	Albert Denison Somerville Denison; 1836–1903	Henry Denison; 1849–1936	Conyngham Denison; 1851–1938	Harold Albert Denison; 1856–1848
Henry Francis Conyngham; 1857–1897; 4th Marquess Conyngham, etc., 6th Baron Conyngham	Jane Seymour Conyngham; 1860–1941	Violet Anne Blanche Lambart	William Francis Henry Denison; 1864–1917; 2nd Earl of Londesborough, etc., 3rd Baron Londesborough	Ernest William Denison; 1876–1963; 6th Baron Londesborough
Victor George Henry Francis Conyngham; 1883–1918; 5th Marquess Conyngham, etc., 7th Baron Conyngham	Frederick William Burton Conyngham; 1890–1974; 6th Marquess Conyngham, etc., 8th Baron Conyngham	Winifred Phyllis Seymour	Robert Lambart Dunville	George Francis William Henry Denison; 1892–1920; 3rd Earl of Londesborough, etc., 4th Baron Londesborough	Hugo William Cecil Denison; 1894–1937; 4th Earl of Londesborough, etc., 5th Baron Londesborough	Edward Denison; 1888–1960	Conyngham Charles Denison; 1885–1967; 7th Baron Londesborough	Gerald Denison; 1892–1915	John Albert Lister Denison; 1901–1968; 8th Baron Londesborough
Earldom of Londesborough and viscountcy Raincliffe extinct, 1937
Frederick William Henry Francis Conyngham; 1924–2009; 7th Marquess Conyngham, etc., 9th Baron Conyngham	Philip Denison; 1919–1945
Baron Londesborough of Richmond Hill, 2026
Henry Vivien Pierpont Conyngham; 1951–2025; 8th Marquess Conyngham, etc., 10th Baron Conyngham	Richard Denison b. 1959; 9th Baron Londesborough, Baron Londesborough of Richmond Hill
Baron Londesborough of Richmond Hill is a life peerage
Alexander Burton Conyngham b. 1975; 9th Marquess Conyngham, etc., 11th Baron Conyngham	James Denison b. 1990
Heir apparent to the Barony Londesborough
Rory Nicholas Burton Conyngham b. 2010 styled Earl of Mount Charles
Heir apparent to the Conyngham Marquessate

Marquesses Conyngham line of succession
- General Sir Henry Conyngham, 1st Marquess Conyngham (1766–1832)
  - Henry Francis Conyngham, Earl of Mount Charles (1795–1824)
  - General Sir Francis Nathaniel Conyngham, 2nd Marquess Conyngham (1797–1876)
    - General George Henry Conyngham, 3rd Marquess Conyngham (1825–1882)
      - Henry Francis Conyngham, 4th Marquess Conyngham (1857–1897)
        - Victor George Henry Francis Conyngham, 5th Marquess Conyngham (1883–1918)
        - Frederick William Burton Conyngham, 6th Marquess Conyngham (1890–1974)
          - Frederick William Henry Francis Conyngham, 7th Marquess Conyngham (1924–2009)
            - Henry Vivien Pierpont Conyngham, 8th Marquess Conyngham (1951–2025)
              - Alexander Burton Conyngham, 9th Marquess Conyngham (b. 1975)
                - (1) Rory Nicholas Burton Conyngham, Earl of Mount Charles (b. 2010)
                - (2) Lord Caspar Conyngham (b. 2012)
            - (3) Lord Simon Charles Eveleigh Wren Conyngham (b. 1953)
            - (4) Lord Frederick William Patrick Conyngham (b. 1959)
  - Albert Denison Denison, 1st Baron Londesborough (1805–1860)
    - Hon. Harold Albert Denison (1856–1948)
      - John Albert Lister Denison, 8th Baron Londesborough (1901–1968)
        - (5) Richard John Denison, 9th Baron Londesborough (b. 1959)
          - (1, 6) Hon. James Frederick Denison (b. 1990)

== See also ==
- Baron Londesborough
