= Joseph Denison =

Joseph Denison may refer to:

- Joseph Denison (banker) (1726–1806), English banker
- Joseph Denison (pastor) (1815–1900), American Methodist pastor
