= George Vaughan Hart (British Army officer) =

British soldier and politician (1752–1832)

General George Vaughan Hart (1752 – 14 June 1832) was a British Army officer and politician.

He served with the 46th Regiment of Foot during the American War of Independence. He moved to India, where he took part in the battles of Seringapatam and Bangalore. From 1812 to 1831 he served as member of parliament for County Donegal.

He was later Governor of Londonderry and Culmore Fort.

Parliament of the United Kingdom
| Preceded by Sir James Stewart; Henry Conyngham Montgomery | Member of Parliament for County Donegal; 1812–1831; With: Sir James Stewart 1812–1818; Henry, Earl of Mount Charles 1818–1825; Francis, Earl of Mount Charles 1825–1831 | Succeeded by Sir Edmund Hayes; Edward Conolly |
Military offices
| Preceded by The Earl of Suffolk | Governor of Londonderry; 1820–1832 | Succeeded by Sir John Byng |
