= Francis Conyngham, 2nd Marquess Conyngham =

Anglo-Irish military officer, courtier, politician and landowner (1797–1876)

General The Most Honourable The Marquess Conyngham KP GCH PC
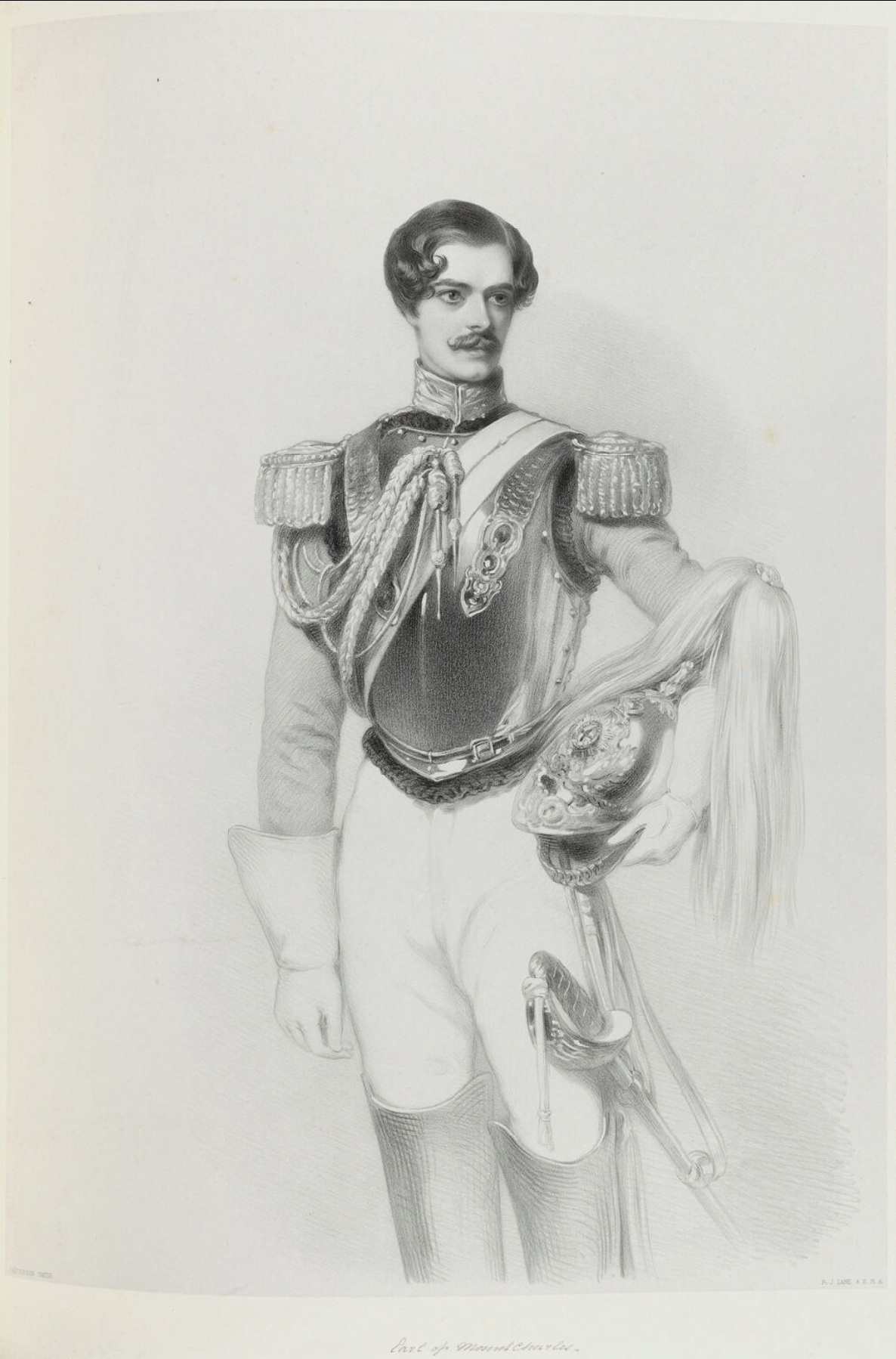
- Engraving by Richard James Lane after a Stephen Catterson Smith portrait, 1850

Postmaster General
- In office 5 July 1834 – 14 November 1834
- Monarch: William IV
- Prime Minister: The Viscount Melbourne
- Preceded by: The Duke of Richmond
- Succeeded by: The Lord Maryborough
- In office 30 April 1835 – 22 May 1835
- Monarch: William IV
- Prime Minister: The Viscount Melbourne
- Preceded by: The Lord Maryborough
- Succeeded by: The Earl of Lichfield

Lord Chamberlain of the Household
- In office 22 May 1835 – 6 May 1839
- Monarchs: William IV; Queen Victoria
- Prime Minister: The Viscount Melbourne
- Preceded by: The Marquess Wellesley
- Succeeded by: The Earl of Uxbridge

Personal details
- Born: Francis Nathaniel Conyngham; 11 June 1797 Dublin, Ireland
- Died: 17 July 1876 (aged 79) London, England
- Spouse(s): Lady Jane Paget (1804–1876)

General Francis Nathaniel Conyngham, 2nd Marquess Conyngham, KP, GCH, PC (11 June 1797 – 17 July 1876), styled Lord Francis Conyngham between 1816 and 1824 and Earl of Mount Charles between 1824 and 1832, was an Anglo-Irish military officer, courtier, politician and landowner.

== Background and education ==
Born in Dublin, Conyngham was the second son of General Henry Conyngham, 1st Marquess Conyngham and Elizabeth, daughter of Joseph Denison, and the brother of Henry Conyngham, Earl of Mount Charles, and Albert Denison, 1st Baron Londesborough. His mother was previously the infamous last mistress of King George IV. He was educated at Eton. He became known as Lord Francis Conyngham in 1816 when his father was created Marquess Conyngham and gained the courtesy title of Earl of Mount Charles in 1824 on the early death of his unmarried elder brother.

== Political career ==
Conyngham was returned to Parliament for Westbury in 1818, a seat he held until 1820, and later represented County Donegal (succeeding his deceased elder brother, the Earl of Mount Charles) between 1825 and 1831. He served under the Earl of Liverpool as Under-Secretary of State for Foreign Affairs between 1823 and 1826 and under Liverpool, George Canning, Lord Goderich and the Duke of Wellington as a Lord of the Treasury between 1826 and 1830. In 1832 he succeeded his father in the marquessate and entered the House of Lords.

In July 1834 Lord Conyngham joined the Whig government of Lord Melbourne as Postmaster General, a post he retained until the government fell in December of the same year, and briefly held the same post under Melbourne again between April and May 1835. The latter month he was sworn of the Privy Council and appointed Lord Chamberlain of the Household. He remained in this position until 1839, when he was succeeded by his brother-in-law the Earl of Uxbridge.

Lord Conyngham was also Vice-Admiral of Ulster between 1849 and 1876 and Lord-Lieutenant of County Meath between 1869 and 1876. He was made a Knight Grand Cross of the Royal Guelphic Order in 1830 and a Knight of the Order of St Patrick in 1833.

== Military career ==
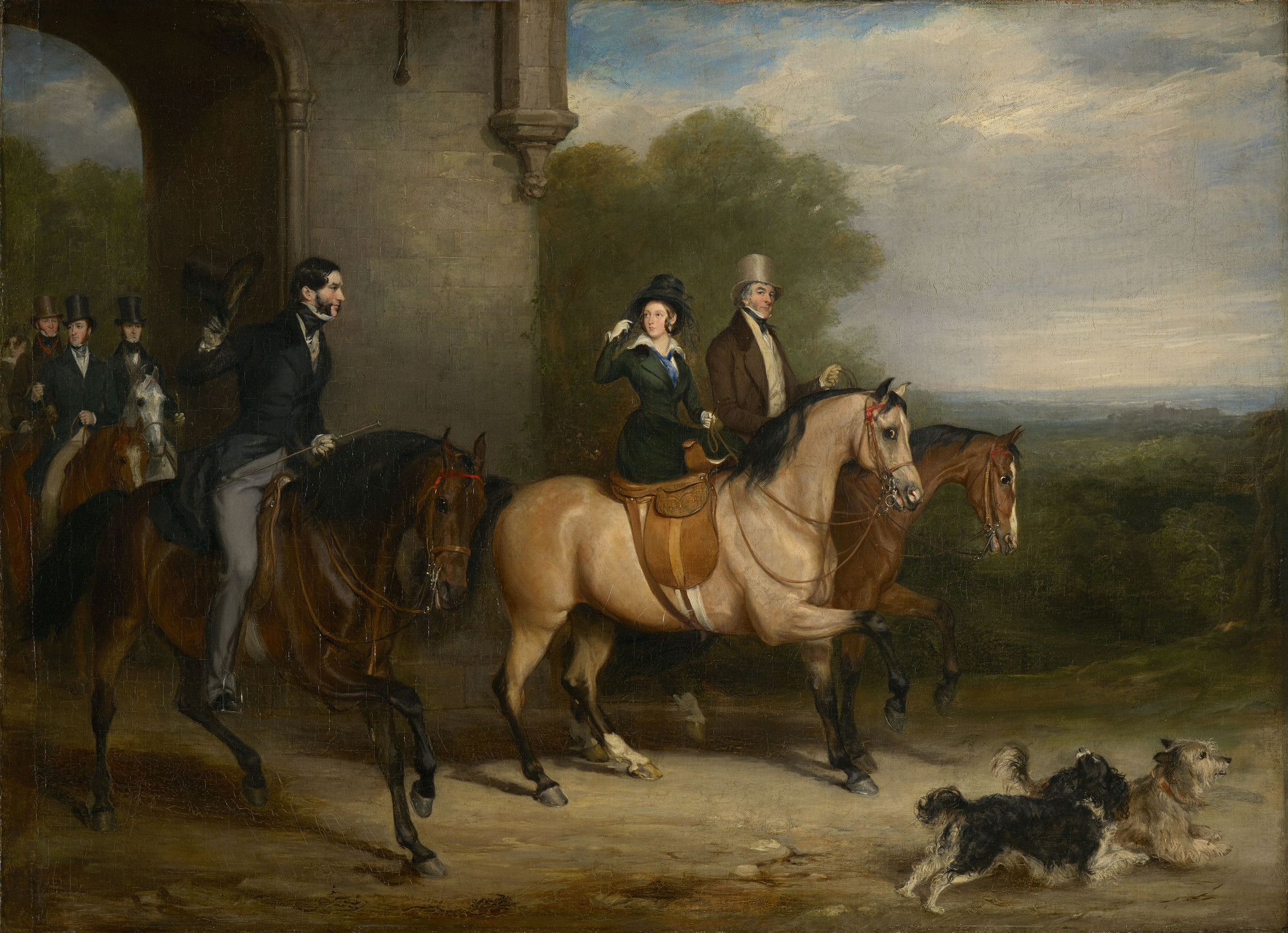
Queen Victoria Riding Out by Francis Grant, 1840. Conyngham is riding behind the Queen, raising his hat

On 21 September 1820, Conyngham purchased a cornetcy in the 22nd Light Dragoons, but this appointment did not take place, and he was replaced by his brother Lord Albert Conyngham, after he was appointed, without purchase, to be cornet and sub-lieutenant in the 2nd Regiment of Life Guards on 23 April 1821. He purchased a lieutenancy in the 9th Light Dragoons on 24 October 1821, and on 13 December, he exchanged from the half-pay of the 9th Light Dragoons into the 1st Regiment of Life Guards. He exchanged again, into the 17th Light Dragoons, on 3 April 1823, and purchased an unattached captaincy on 12 June 1823. Mount Charles, as he then was, transferred to the Ceylon Rifle Regiment, and then purchased an unattached majority on 2 October 1827. He was appointed Lieutenant-Colonel of the disembodied Clare Militia on 28 December 1825, resigning in 1854. He became a Major-General in 1858, a Lieutenant-General in 1866 and a full General in 1874. He was appointed Honorary Colonel of the Royal Meath Militia on 20 December 1870.

== Ireland and the Famine ==
Conyngham was an absentee landlord over estates in Ireland; particularly in County Donegal (covering Glenties, Arranmore and most of the barony of Boylagh). He showed little interest in these estates he claimed there. According to Thomas Campbell Foster in an 1845 report for The Times, Conyngham had visited the area once in his life for a few days. Conyngham instead hired the MP John Benbow as his chief managing agent, who visited once a year and sub-agents collected rent from tenants twice a year. Foster's report described these estates as such "from one end of his large estate here to the other, nothing is to be found but poverty, misery, wretched cultivation, and infinite subdivision of land."

As the poverty was particularly severe on Conyngham's estates, the Great Famine was miserable for his tenants. They had been surviving on a diet of potatoes and water due to constantly rising rent levels, and those in Arranmore lived on seaweed for part of the year. Conyngham sold Arranmore in 1847 to the Belfast land speculator Walter Chorley for £200, who evicted all the sub-tenants, many of whom fled to Donegal Town or emigrated to North America.

== Courtier ==
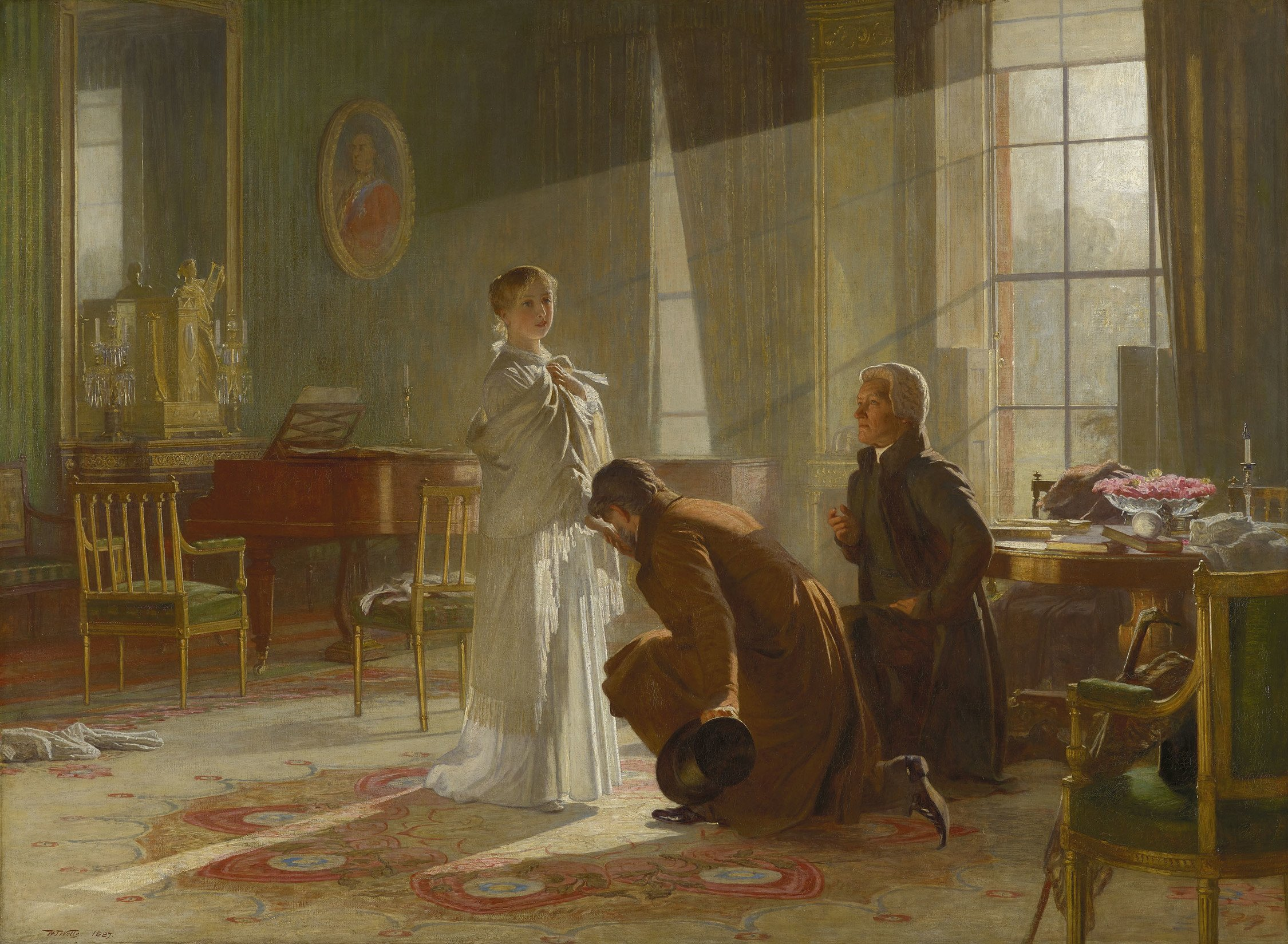
Victoria Regina by Henry Tanworth Wells. Queen Victoria receives the news of her accession from Lord Conyngham (left) and the Archbishop of Canterbury.

In his youth, Lord Conyngham was a Page of Honour to the Prince Regent (later George IV). Between 1820 and 1830 he was a Groom of the Bedchamber and Master of the Robes to George IV. As Lord Chamberlain, it fell to him on the death of William IV to go with the Archbishop of Canterbury to Kensington Palace at 5 a.m. on 20 June 1837 to inform Princess Victoria that she was now Queen of Great Britain and Ireland. He was the first to address her as "Your Majesty".

== Family ==
Lord Conyngham married Lady Jane Paget, daughter of Henry Paget, 1st Marquess of Anglesey, on 23 April 1824. They had six children:

- George Henry Conyngham, 3rd Marquess Conyngham (1825–1882)
- Lady Jane Conyngham (1826–1900), married Francis Spencer, 2nd Baron Churchill and had issue.
- Lady Frances Caroline Martha Conyngham (1827–1898), married Gustavus Lambart and had issue. Their son was Sir Gustavus Francis William Lambart, 1st Bt. (1848–1926). Daughter Violet Anne Blanche Lambart married John Dunville Dunville, Chairman of Dunville & Co.
- Lady Elizabeth Georgiana Conyngham (1829–1904), married George Finch-Hatton, 11th Earl of Winchilsea.
- Lady Cecilia Augusta Conyngham (1831–1877), married Sir Theodore Brinckman, 2nd Baronet and had issue.
- Lord Francis Nathaniel Conyngham (1832–1880), politician.

Lady Conyngham died at Folkestone, Kent, in January 1876, aged 77. Lord Conyngham only survived her by five months and died in London in July 1876, aged 79, after an operation for lithotomy. He was succeeded in the marquessate by his eldest son, George.

Parliament of the United Kingdom
Preceded by Benjamin Shaw; Ralph Franco	Member of Parliament for Westbury; 1818–1820; With: Ralph Franco 1818–1819; William Leader Maberly 1819–1820	Succeeded by Jonathan Elford; Nathaniel Barton
Preceded by Earl of Mount Charles; George Vaughan Hart	Member of Parliament for County Donegal; 1825–1831; With: George Vaughan Hart	Succeeded by Sir Edmund Hayes; Edward Conolly
Political offices
Preceded by The Earl of Clanwilliam	Under-Secretary of State for Foreign Affairs; 1823–1826; With: The Lord Howard de Walden from 1824	Succeeded by The Lord Howard de Walden; The Marquess of Clanricarde
Preceded by The Duke of Richmond	Postmaster General; 1834	Succeeded by The Lord Maryborough
Preceded by The Lord Maryborough	Postmaster General; 1835	Succeeded by The Earl of Lichfield
Preceded by The Marquess Wellesley	Lord Chamberlain; 1835–1839	Succeeded by The Earl of Uxbridge
Court offices
Preceded by Charles Nassau Thomas	Master of the Robes; 1820–1830	Succeeded by Sir Charles Pole, Bt
Honorary titles
Preceded by The Earl of Fingall	Lord Lieutenant of Meath; 1869–1876	Succeeded by The Marquess of Headfort
Peerage of Ireland
Preceded by Henry Conyngham	Marquess Conyngham; 1832–1879	Succeeded by George Conyngham
