= Leslie Corry =

Irish politician (1712–1741)

Colonel Leslie Corry (15 October 1712 – 20 February 1741) was an Irish politician.

He was the son of Colonel John Corry and his wife Sarah Leslie, daughter of William Leslie. Corry was educated at Trinity College, Dublin and graduated with a Bachelor of Arts in 1732. In 1737, he became High Sheriff of Fermanagh and in 1740, he was appointed Colonel of the Fermanagh Militia. The year before, Corry had stood as Member of Parliament (MP) in the Irish House of Commons for Killybegs, a seat he held until his death in 1741.

Corry died unmarried and childless, aged only 28.

Parliament of Ireland
Preceded by William Conyngham; Henry Conyngham	Member of Parliament for Killybegs; 1739–1741; With: Henry Conyngham	Succeeded by Henry Conyngham; Henry Conyngham
