= Roland Walker =

British Army officer (born 1970)

General Sir Roly Walker KCB DSO ADC Gen
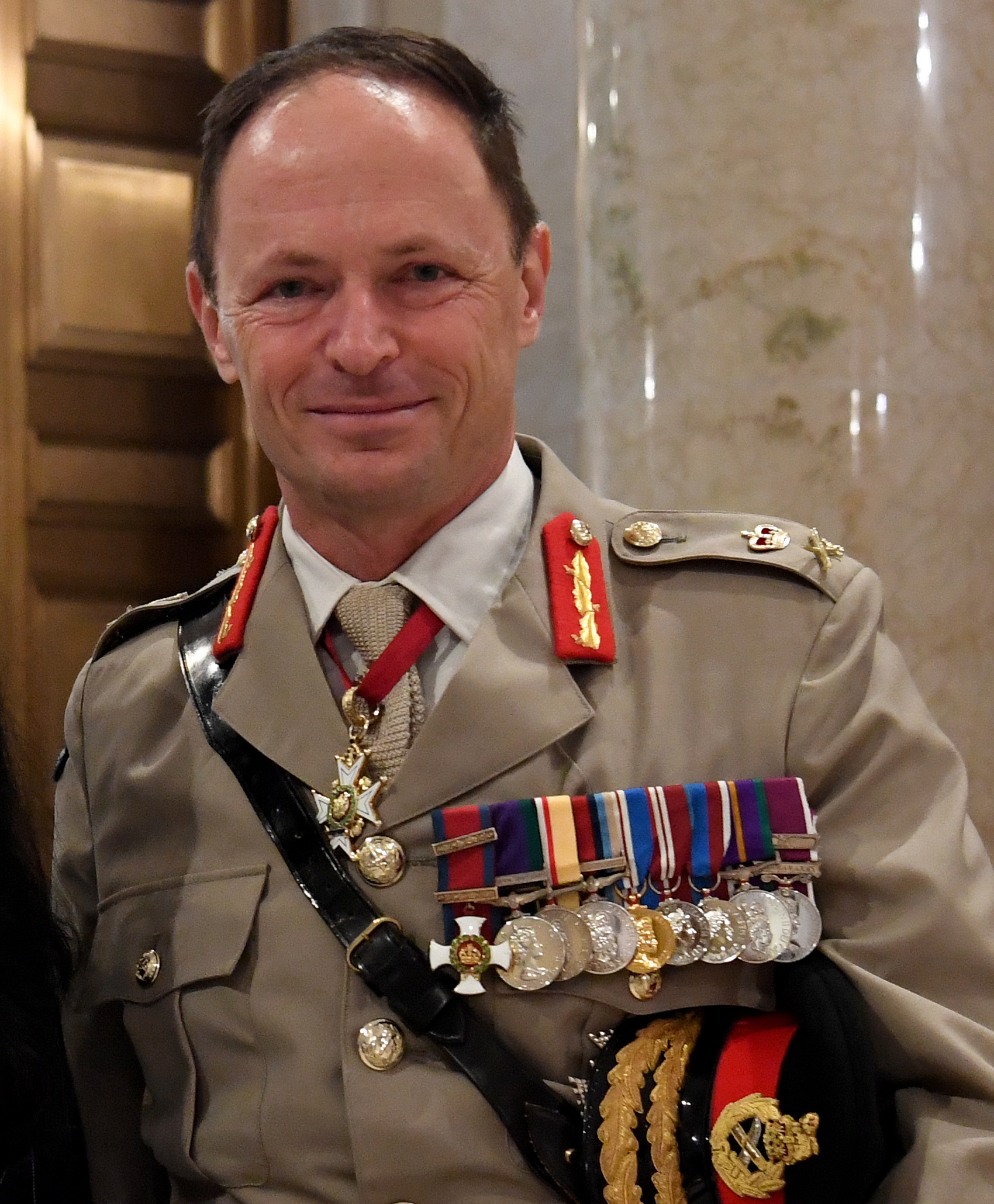
- Lieutenant General Walker in 2023
- Born: Charles Roland Vincent Walker; 14 May 1970 (age 56); Nairobi, Kenya
- Education: Royal Agricultural College
- Spouse: Kate White-Thomson (m. 1998)
- Military career
- Allegiance: United Kingdom
- Branch: British Army
- Service years: 1990–present
- Rank: General
- Nickname: Roly
- Unit: Grenadier Guards
- Commands: Chief of the General Staff (2024–); Deputy Chief of the Defence Staff (2021–2024); Director Special Forces (2018–2021); 12th Armoured Infantry Brigade (2013–2015); 1st Battalion, Grenadier Guards (2008–2010)
- Conflicts: The Troubles; Iraq War; War in Afghanistan
- Awards: Knight Commander of the Order of the Bath; Companion of the Distinguished Service Order

General Sir Charles Roland Vincent Walker (born 14 May 1970) is a senior British Army officer, who has served as Chief of the General Staff, the professional head of the British Army, since 15 June 2024. Walker previously served as Deputy Chief of the Defence Staff (Military Strategy and Operations) from April 2021 until June 2024.

== Early life and education ==
Walker was born on 14 May 1970 in Nairobi, Kenya, to Patrick Walker and Daphne Walker (née Armour). His mother later married Frederick Conyngham, 7th Marquess Conyngham, in 1980. He was educated at the Dragon School, a private preparatory school in Oxford, and then at Harrow School, an all-boys independent boarding school in London. Sponsored by the British Army as a university cadetship officer, he studied at the Royal Agricultural College, graduating with a Bachelor of Science degree. He later studied at Cranfield University, graduating with a Master of Arts degree.

== Military career ==
Walker was commissioned into the Irish Guards as a second lieutenant (on probation) on 9 September 1990 as part of his undergraduate cadetship. In September 1993, his commission was confirmed and he was promoted to lieutenant back-dated to 11 August 1992. He began active service in the Irish Guards in 1993, and saw operational tours in Northern Ireland and Iraq. He was promoted to captain on 11 August 1995. In 1997, he joined 22 Special Air Service Regiment. He was promoted to major on 30 September 2000. He attended the Advanced Command and Staff Course from 2001 to 2003. Between 2003 and 2007, he undertook multiple operational tours in Iraq. He was promoted to lieutenant colonel on 30 June 2008.

Following his time with Special Forces, Walker transferred from the Irish Guards to the Grenadier Guards on 11 November 2008. He served as commanding officer of the 1st Battalion, Grenadier Guards from 2008 to 2010. With the Grenadiers, he served a tour in Afghanistan, during which the Ridgeback PPV in which he was travelling was blown up by an improvised explosive device (IED): all six soldiers inside escaped uninjured, but the vehicle was thrown into the air, had its wheels blown off and its armour shredded. Walker was appointed a Companion of the Distinguished Service Order (DSO) in September 2010 in recognition of gallant and distinguished services in Afghanistan during the period 1 October 2009 to 31 March 2010. He was promoted to colonel on 30 June 2012.

Walker commanded the 12th Armoured Infantry Brigade from 2013 to 2015, and was promoted to brigadier on 30 June 2014. He has since held staff appointments at Army Headquarters and the Ministry of Defence. He was promoted to major general on 8 March 2018, and appointed Director Special Forces. He was promoted to lieutenant general and became Deputy Chief of Defence Staff (Military Strategy and Operations) on 16 April 2021. He was appointed a Knight Commander of the Order of the Bath (KCB) in the 2023 New Year Honours, thereby granted the title sir.

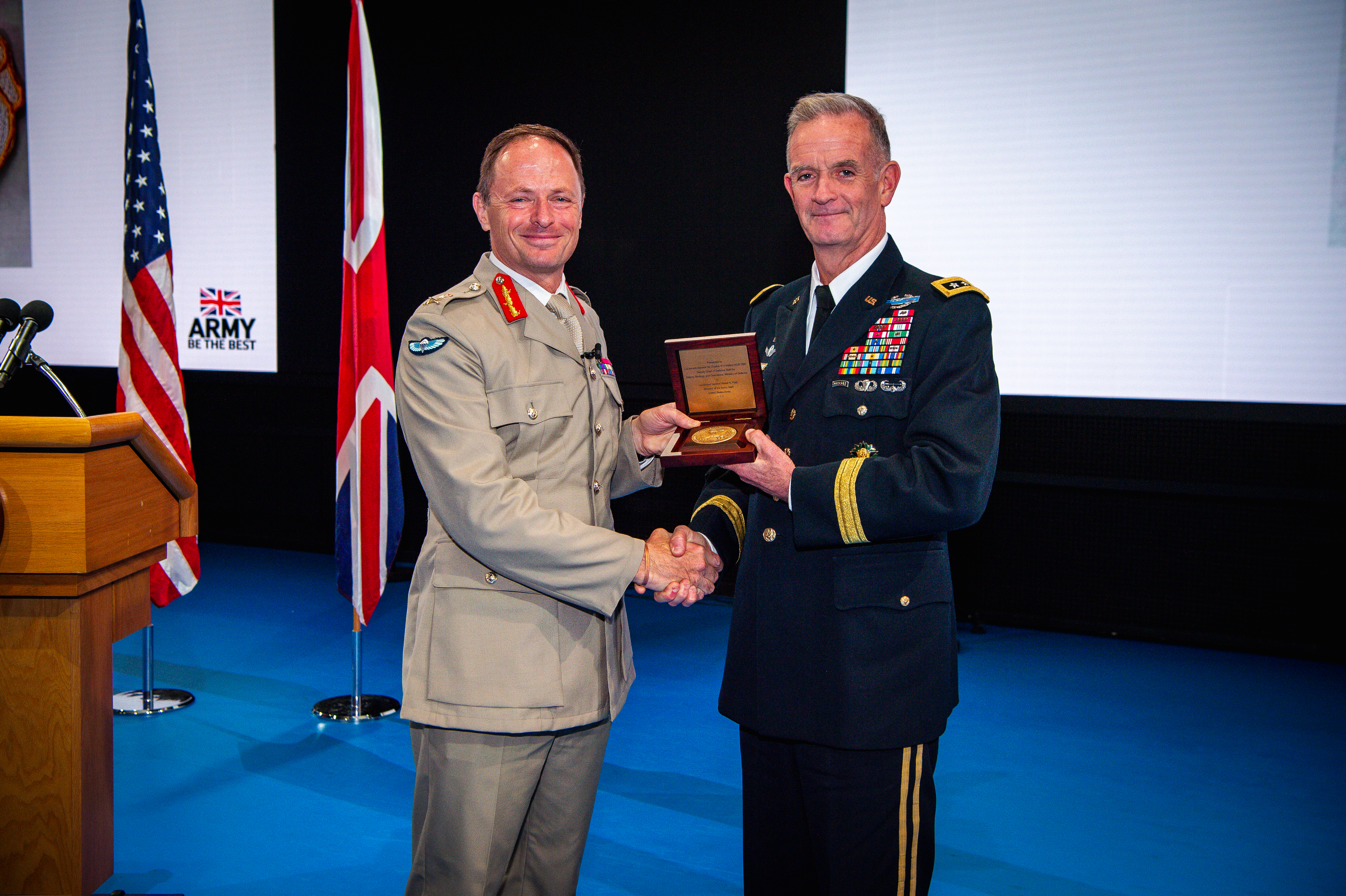
Walker (left) on a visit to the United States in 2023

Walker served as Colonel Commandant of the Royal Army Veterinary Corps from 1 March 2017 to 1 June 2022, and Regimental Lieutenant Colonel of the Grenadier Guards from 18 June 2017 to 18 June 2022; both ceremonial appointments. He was Honorary Colonel of the Cambridge University Officers' Training Corps until June 2024. He was appointed Colonel Commandant of the Honourable Artillery Company on 30 May 2024.

=== Chief of the General Staff ===
It was announced in December 2023 that Walker had been selected to be the next Chief of the General Staff, the professional head of the British Army, and would take up the post in June 2024. He took up the post on 16 June 2024. On the same day, he was promoted to general and appointed Aide-de-camp general to the King.

On 23 July 2024, Walker warned of the threat posed by Russia, China, Iran and North Korea. He said the UK must be prepared for a possible war with Russia by 2027.

Walker said there were "no winners" in Russia's invasion of Ukraine, adding that "it is an utter devastation for both sides and lost generations." He said that with the current way of fighting, it would take Russia five years to control the four regions of Donetsk, Luhansk, Kherson and Zaporizhia that Russia claims as its own, and it would cost Russia more than 1.5 million casualties. He said: "It doesn’t matter how it ends. I think Russia will emerge from it probably weaker objectively – or absolutely – but still very, very dangerous and wanting some form of retribution for what we have done to help Ukraine."

In 2025, he was considered for the appointment of Chief of the Defence Staff, the professional head of the British Armed Forces, but came runner up to Sir Rich Knighton.

== Personal life ==
In 1998, Walker married Kate White-Thomson. They have three daughters and live in Herefordshire.

== Honours and awards ==
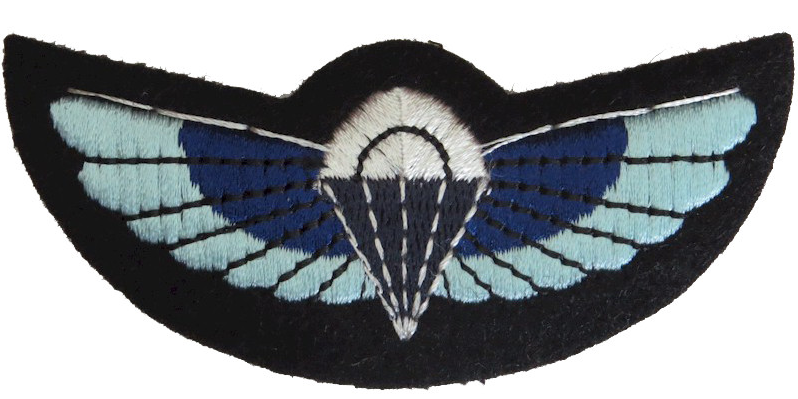

Ribbon	Description	Notes
	Knight Commander of the Most Honourable Order of the Bath	Appointed in 2023
	Companion of the Distinguished Service Order	Appointed in 2010
	General Service Medal	
	Iraq Medal	
	Operational Service Medal for Afghanistan	With clasp
	Queen Elizabeth II Golden Jubilee Medal	
	Queen Elizabeth II Diamond Jubilee Medal	
	Queen Elizabeth II Platinum Jubilee Medal	
	King Charles III Coronation Medal	
	Accumulated Campaign Service Medal	
	Medal for Long Service and Good Conduct (Military)	With bar

Military offices
Preceded by James Chiswell	Director Special Forces; 2018–2021	Succeeded by Gwyn Jenkins
Preceded by Douglas Chalmers	Deputy Chief of the Defence Staff (Military Strategy and Operations); 2021–2024	Succeeded by Harv Smyth
Preceded by Sir Patrick Sanders	Colonel Commandant and President, Honourable Artillery Company; 2024–present	Incumbent
Preceded by Sir Patrick Sanders	Chief of the General Staff; 2024–present	Incumbent
