= Frederick Conyngham, 7th Marquess Conyngham =

Irish nobleman (1924–2009)

Conyngham coat of arms

Frederick William Henry Francis Conyngham, 7th Marquess Conyngham (13 March 1924 – 3 March 2009), known among friends and family as Mount, was an Anglo-Irish nobleman, landowner and British Army officer, who was styled Earl of Mount Charles until 1974.

== Biography ==
The elder son of Frederick Conyngham, 6th Marquess Conyngham, Lord Mount Charles was educated at Eton College, an all-boys independent boarding school. On 5 June 1943, he was commissioned in the Irish Guards as a Second Lieutenant. He served with distinction during the Second World War in Africa and Europe being mentioned in despatches. He left the British Army in 1945 with the rank of Captain.

Descended from a prominent aristocratic landowning family of Counties Meath and Donegal, Conyngham built a reputation as a conservationist. A talented sportsman, golf and angling were among his favourite pursuits.

On the death of his father in 1974 he succeeded to the family titles. Although most of his titles were in the Peerage of Ireland, he became eligible to sit in the British House of Lords by virtue of his subsidiary title Baron Minster, in the Peerage of the United Kingdom. Despite this, he never took his seat, and with the passage of the House of Lords Act 1999 lost his right.

In 1976, he left Ireland to live in the Isle of Man, although he continued to visit his son at Slane Castle. He fell ill with cancer in late 2008 and died six months later on a visit to Johannesburg in March 2009, aged 84.

Lord Conyngham's funeral on 10 March 2009 at St Paul's Church, Ramsey, Isle of Man was led by Bishop Robert Paterson.

== Marriages and children ==
On 29 April 1950, Conyngham married Eileen Wren Newsam, by whom he had three sons before divorcing in 1970:

- Henry Vivien Pierpont Conyngham, 8th Marquess Conyngham (23 May 1951 – 18 June 2025)
- Lord Simon Charles Eveleigh Wren Conyngham (born 20 November 1953)
- Lord Frederick William Patrick Conyngham (born 23 March 1959)

His second marriage, in 1971, to Elizabeth Rudd (née Hughes) was also dissolved. His third wife, Daphne Walker (née Armour), whom he married in 1980, died in 1986: a son from her first marriage is General Sir Roland Walker. He married fourthly, in 1987, Annabelle (née Agnew), now styled Dowager Marchioness Conyngham, who was appointed a Dame of Justice of the Order of St John (DStJ) in 2010.

Peerage of Ireland
Preceded by Frederick Conyngham	Marquess Conyngham; 1974–2009	Succeeded by Henry Conyngham
