= Francis Conyngham, 2nd Baron Conyngham =

Irish politician and peer

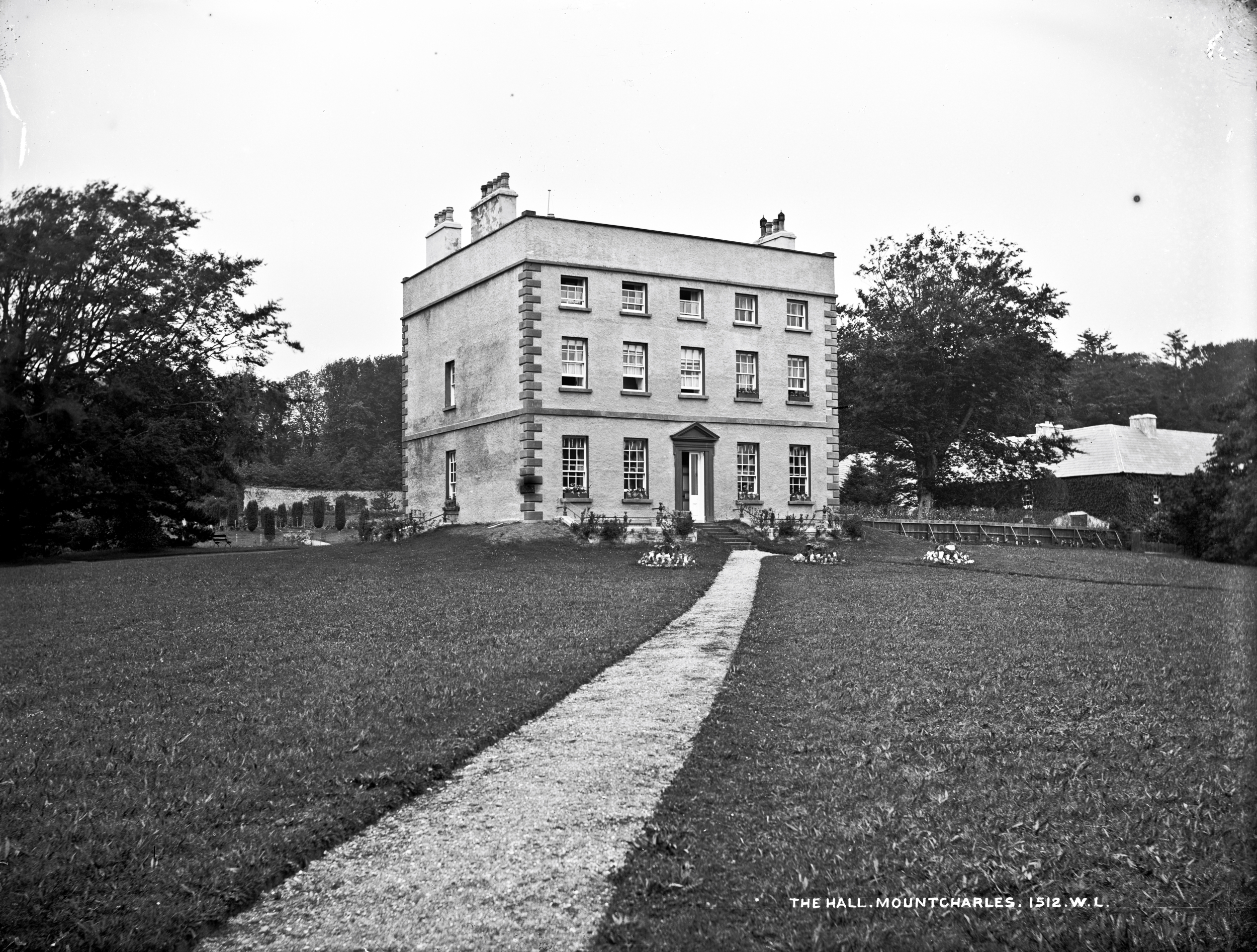
The Hall, Mountcharles circa 1900.

Francis Conyngham, 2nd Baron Conyngham (born Francis Pierpoint Burton; c.1725 – 22 May 1787) was an Irish peer and politician.

== Biography ==
Burton was the eldest of two sons born to politician Francis Burton of County Clare by his wife, Mary (née Conyngham). His paternal grandfather, also named Francis Burton (1640–1714), sat in the Irish parliament for Ennis from 1691 to 1714. Originally a branch of the Musards, Lords of Stavely, the Burton family settled in Richmond, Yorkshire after the Norman Conquest. Sir Edward Burton (1442–1524), knighted by Edward IV in 1460 after the Second Battle of St Albans, settled in Longnor, Shropshire. His descendant Thomas Burton moved to Ireland in 1610.

On his maternal side, his great-grandfather was Lt.-Gen. Sir Albert Conyngham. His ancestors, Scottish Protestants whose name was spelt Cunningham, had come to Ireland during the Plantation of Ulster. His grandfather was Major General Henry Conyngham, who claimed significant lands in County Meath, including Slane Castle. Burton's uncle Henry Conyngham served in the Irish and British Parliaments.

He was created Baron Conyngham of Mount Charles in 1753 and Viscount Conyngham in 1756. On 4 January 1781, he was further elevated as Earl Conyngham and additionally created Baron Conyngham, this time with a special remainder to his eldest nephew. All the titles were in the Peerage of Ireland.

He was a Member of Parliament (MP) in the Irish House of Commons for Killybegs from 1753 until 1761. He then represented County Clare between 1761 and 1768, a seat previously held by his father.

When Earl Conyngham died childless on 3 April 1781, all the titles expired, except the barony, which Burton inherited. He changed his surname to Conyngham by royal license on 3 May 1781.

Conyngham was the elder brother of William Burton Conyngham, who inherited his uncle's estates in Slane and Donegal. When he died in 1796, he left the estates to his eldest nephew, Henry.

== Marriage and issue ==
On 19 March 1750, Burton married Elizabeth Clements, eldest daughter of Nathaniel Clements and younger sister of Robert Clements, 1st Earl of Leitrim. They had twin sons and three daughters.

- Henry Burton Conyngham, 1st Marquess Conyngham (1766–1832)
- Sir Francis Nathaniel Pierpoint Burton Conyngham (1766–1832), governor-general of Quebec, married Valentina Letitia Lawless, daughter of Nicholas Lawless, 1st Baron Cloncurry
- Catherine Burton, married on 26 March 1785 to Rev. John Shirley Fermor
- Ellena Burton, married on 11 December 1777 to Stewart Weldon
- Henrietta Burton (1765–1831), unmarried

The second baron died in 1787 and was succeeded by his eldest son, Henry, a politician and courtier who was elevated to Viscount Conyngham of Mount Charles in 1789. He was further elevated in 1816 to Marquess Conyngham, Earl of Mount Charles and Viscount Slane. In 1821, he was created Baron Minster of Minster Abbey in the Peerage of Great Britain.

Parliament of Ireland
Preceded by Henry Gore; Henry Conyngham	Member of Parliament for Killybegs; 1753–1761; With: Henry Gore	Succeeded by Richard Jones; William Gerard Hamilton
Preceded by Murrough O'Brien; Sir Edward O'Brien, 2nd Bt	Member of Parliament for County Clare; 1761–1776; With: Sir Edward O'Brien, 2nd Bt 1761–1765; Charles MacDonnell 1765–1768; Sir Lucius O'Brien, 3rd Bt 1768–1776	Succeeded by Edward FitzGerald; Hugh Dillon Massy
Peerage of Ireland
Preceded by Henry Conyngham	Baron Conyngham; 1781–1787	Succeeded by Henry Conyngham
