= Henry Mountcharles =

Anglo-Irish aristocrat (1951–2025)

The Most Honourable The Marquess Conyngham
- Henry Mountcharles, c. early 2000s. He succeeded as the 8th Marquess Conyngham in March 2009.
- Born: 25 May 1951; Dublin, Ireland
- Died: 18 June 2025 (aged 74); Dublin, Ireland
- Citizenship: Ireland; United Kingdom
- Education: Harvard University
- Occupations: Aristocrat; concert promoter; landowner; columnist; distillery founder
- Years active: 1981–2023
- Known for: Rock concerts at Slane Castle
- Spouses: Juliet Ann Kitson (m. 1971; div. 1985); Lady Iona Charlotte Grimston (m. 1985)
- Children: 4
- Father: The 7th Marquess Conyngham

Henry Vivien Pierpont Conyngham, 8th Marquess Conyngham (25 May 1951 – 18 June 2025), styled Viscount Slane until 1974 then Earl of Mount Charles from 1974 until 2009 and predominantly known as Lord Henry Mountcharles, was an Anglo-Irish aristocrat who was best known for the Slane Festival rock concerts that he organised at his stately home Slane Castle, and for his column in the Irish Daily Mirror under the byline "Lord Henry".

== Early life and succession ==
Henry Conyngham was born into an aristocratic Anglo-Irish family of partial Ulster-Scots descent, formerly part of the Protestant Ascendancy, the eldest son of the 7th Marquess Conyngham with his first wife, Eileen Wren Newsom.

He attended Harrow School before studying at Harvard University. He became known as the Earl of Mount Charles, or Lord Mount Charles, a courtesy title, in 1974. He succeeded his father as Marquess Conyngham and other hereditary peerages in March 2009 but was commonly referred to as Henry Mountcharles. He also inherited the title Baron Minster, of Minster Abbey in the County of Kent, created in 1821 in the Peerage of the United Kingdom for his ancestor, the 1st Marquess Conyngham (which gave the Marquesses Conyngham the automatic right to sit in the British House of Lords, until 1999).

Mountcharles and his wife, born Iona Grimston, divided their time between Beauparc House and Slane Castle in County Meath; the latter was the family's principal ancestral seat until it was badly damaged by fire in 1991, but it has since been restored.

== Promoter of the Slane music festival ==
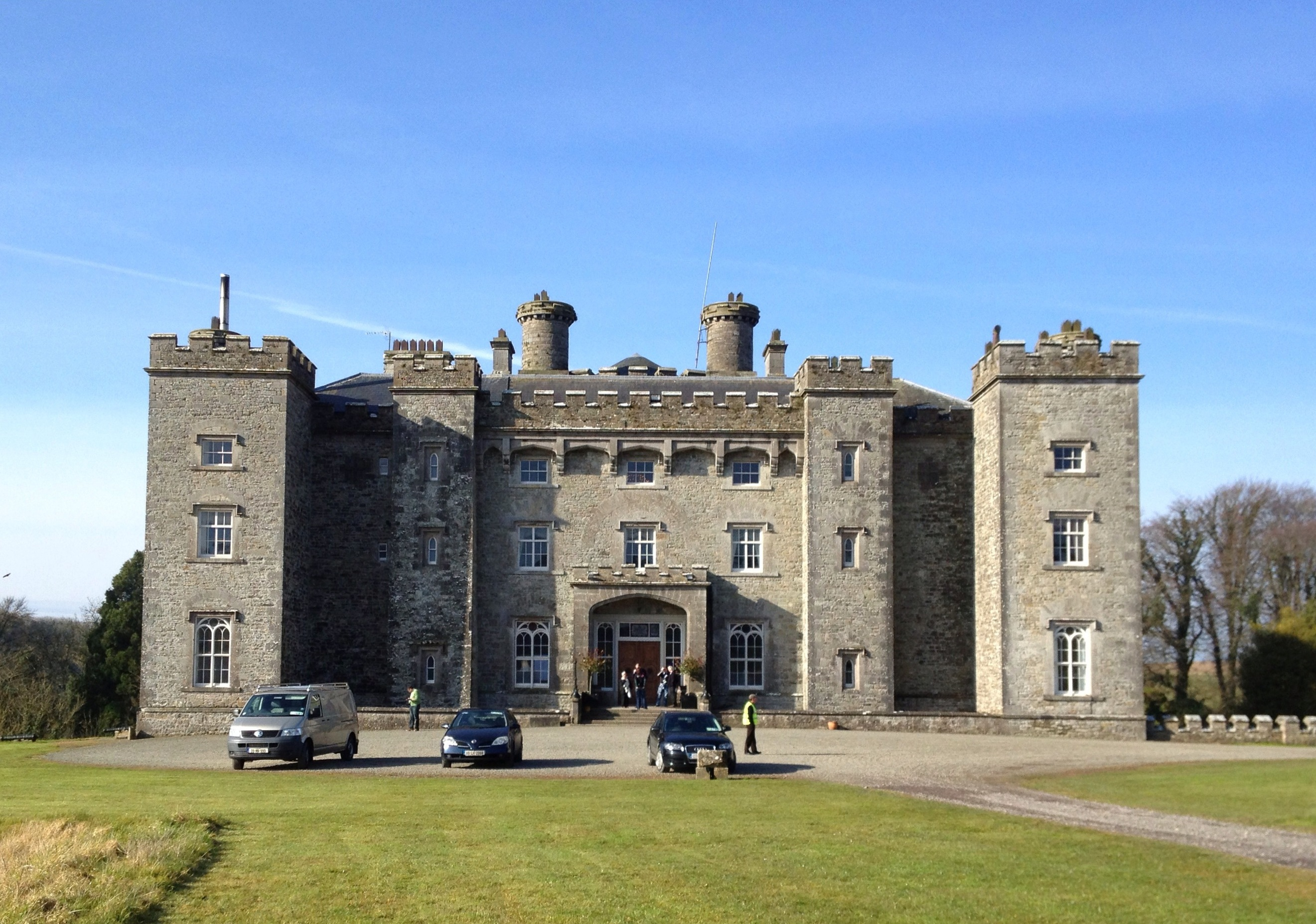
The front of Slane Castle, the ancestral home of Lord Conyngham and also the site of his professional success

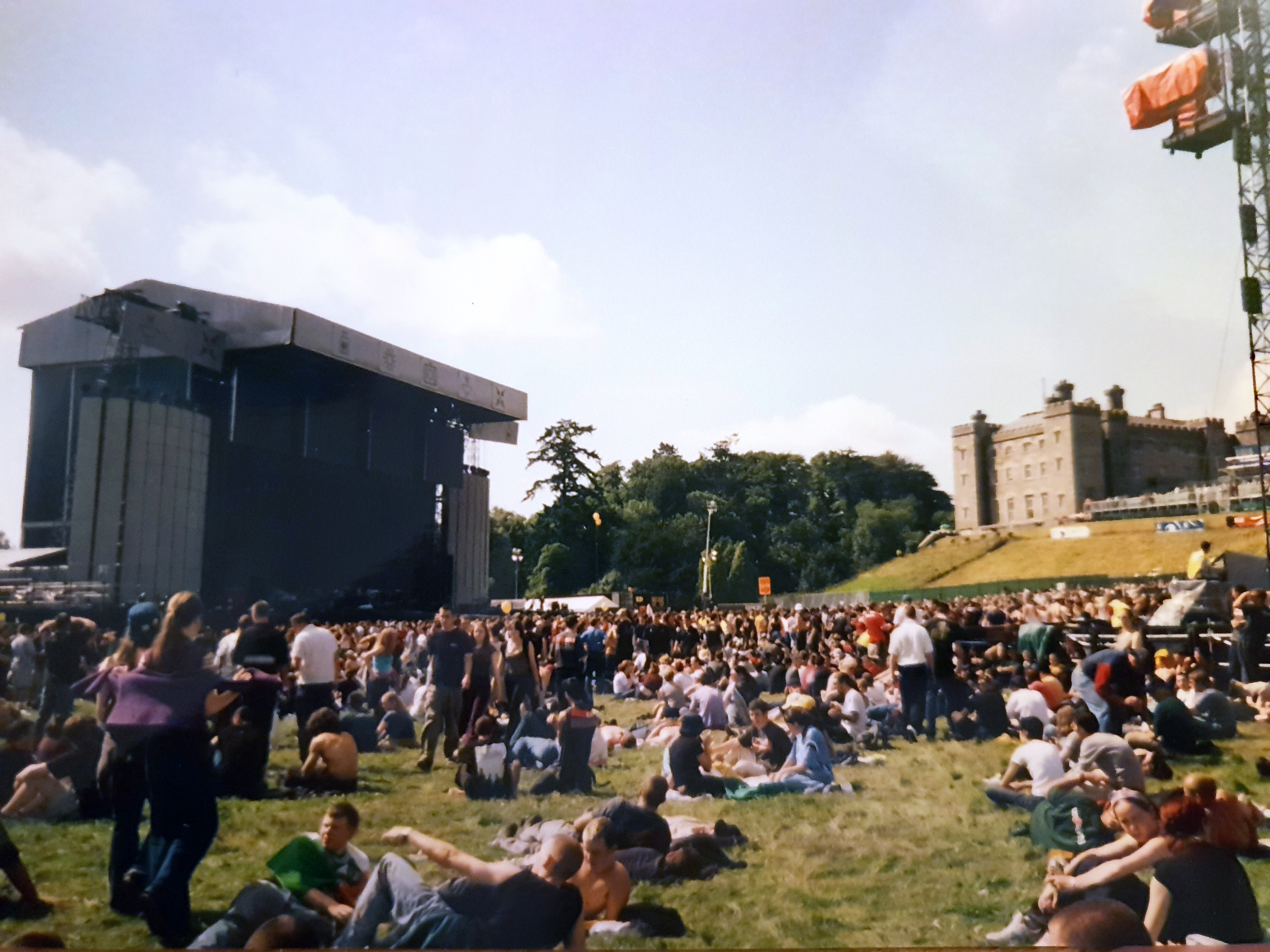
Fans begin to gather early in the day for a U2 concert at Slane in 2001. Slane Castle can be seen to the right.

Mountcharles returned to live full-time at Slane Castle in 1976, and immediately began to seek means to support the estate. Mountcharles and his family explored various uses for the estate's outbuildings and lands (restaurant, nightclub) before turning their attention to the great field beside the castle. It was during these early surveys that Mountcharles noted the way the hillside sloped gently down to the River Boyne and realised it formed a "natural amphitheatre" ideally suited to open-air performances. The site comprises a broad, grassy incline running from the stately home at the summit down to the riverbank. This gradient creates terraced "seating" without any earthworks. From the vantage point on castle grounds, Mountcharles saw that he could host crowds of approximately 80,000 without major landscaping or construction. The river to one side and mature woodlands beyond further frame the stage area, lending the venue scenic appeal and a sense of enclosure.

Beyond mere capacity, the slope offered surprisingly good acoustics. The grass and gentle incline absorb and reflect sound in a manner similar to ancient stone amphitheatres, reducing echo and ensuring clear projection even to the back rows. Mountcharles later observed that visiting artists commented on the unique sound quality, noting how "you've got this amphitheatre full of people going mental; a river behind you and a Downton Abbey stately home at the top of the hill". Once convinced of the site's merits, Mountcharles arranged for minimal infrastructure—temporary stages, PA systems and crowd barriers—to test the concept. The inaugural 1981 concert, headlined by Thin Lizzy and U2, was as much a trial run for Slane Festival as a show, attended by some 18,000 people. Its success "put Slane on the map and effectively saved our business", as his son Alex noted years later. From that point on, the natural amphitheatre was locked in as the castle's signature feature, guiding all future concert planning.

The 1982 Rolling Stones concert proved a game-changer. Mountcharles dubbed it the "pathfinder show", lauding its staging and Mick Jagger's down-to-earth visit: "Mick Jagger came down the Thursday before the show and had dinner in the castle". An estimated 70,000 attended, far exceeding any previous Irish rock event, and reinforced Slane's reputation internationally. By 1985, Bruce Springsteen would draw a record 100,000 fans, cementing the venue's status.

Hosting rock concerts in 1980s Ireland posed risks; during the height of the 1981 Irish hunger strike, Mountcharles received personal threats to call off the concert yet remained steadfast: "I was determined come hell or high water there be a show down here". Later, complex planning laws required him to go through court appeals for permission to hold annual concerts, a process he likened to seeking permission for a factory, not a temporary festival.

In 1991, a devastating fire ravaged much of Slane Castle. Funds from subsequent concerts proved vital for reconstruction.

The 1992 Slane Festival, headlined by Guns N' Roses, was one of the most chaotic in its history. Axl Rose went missing before the show and was eventually found passed out in a Dublin pub, while the band's agent was discovered drunk and fishing downriver from Slane Castle. Despite the disorder, the performance went ahead and became well-received, later described by Mountcharles as a "typhoon of chaos".

== Other business ventures ==
The Marquess Conyngham enjoyed a high profile in Ireland as the author of a weekly column in the Irish Daily Mirror.

In 2015, Mountcharles opened an Irish whiskey distillery in the former stableyard within the demesne of Slane Castle, and launched the "Slane Irish Whiskey" brand.

== Political career ==
Mountcharles joined Fine Gael in the mid-1970s, inspired by Garret FitzGerald's leadership and the party's modernising agenda. He saw politics as "at the core of so much that happens" and felt Fine Gael offered a vehicle for someone of his background to contribute to Irish public life. Mountcharles anticipated that he might be given a prominent role without progressing through the usual channels of local politics. This expectation nearly materialised in 1984, when he came within six votes of being selected by a delegate conference to contest the European Parliament election.

After not being added to the party ticket for the 1989 general election, Mountcharles resigned from Fine Gael. He criticised the party as lacking direction and described its constitutional reform agenda as ineffective. He subsequently attempted to establish a new political group, the "New Departure Party", but it failed to attract significant support. When other former Fine Gael members collaborated with Desmond O'Malley and critics of Charles Haughey's leadership in Fianna Fáil to form the Progressive Democrats, they opted not to include him in the initiative.

Mountcharles later rejoined Fine Gael and unsuccessfully contested Louth for Fine Gael at the 1992 general election.

In late 1996, Mountcharles suggested he might stand as an "independent Fine Gael" candidate in the next election, though he did not plan to leave the party. He criticised the Fine Gael Louth selection convention earlier that year as a "shambles" and did not attend it. That convention had chosen Fergus O'Dowd and Terry Brennan to run, while deselecting sitting TD Brendan McGahon, who was unhappy with the delegates and was considering running as an independent. The meeting where Mountcharles spoke was unofficial, and official candidates were not invited or informed. Mountcharles warned that anyone dismissing his political prospects was making a mistake, but did not give a definite answer on whether he would stand for election.

In 1997, he stood for election to Seanad Éireann for Dublin University, again without success. The fact that he was not a graduate of Trinity was a major obstacle to his election.

When Mountcharles stated that he would take his hereditary seat in the British House of Lords upon his father's death, some critics interpreted this as evidence of a perceived British identity, a characterisation he strongly rejected. Ultimately, the House of Lords Act 1999 abolished the automatic right of hereditary peers to sit, and the situation did not arise.

At the 2004 European Parliament election, he was approached by Fine Gael to enter the contest for selection as its candidate for the East constituency. However, when the television presenter and agricultural journalist Maireád McGuinness emerged as a potential candidate, Mountcharles withdrew from the race.

== Personal life ==
Conyngham coat of arms

In 1971, Lord Conyngham married Juliet Ann Kitson, daughter of Major Robert Richard Buller Kitson (Grenadier Guards) and English interior decorator and J. Paul Getty's lover Penelope de László (née Steele, later Baroness Keith of Castleacre). They had three children:

- Alexander Burton Conyngham, 9th Marquess Conyngham (born 30 January 1975), married Carina Bolton (granddaughter of both Sir George Bolton and the 4th Baron Terrington), with whom he has a daughter and two sons:
  - Lady Laragh Conyngham (born 2009)
  - Rory Nicholas Burton Conyngham, Earl of Mount Charles (born 2010)
  - Lord Caspar Conyngham (born 2012)
- Lady Henrietta Tamara Juliet Conyngham (born 1976), married the 6th Earl of Lichfield
- Gerald Wolfe Conyngham (né Kitson-Clancy, born 1978), adopted nephew of his first wife

In 1985, following his divorce from his first wife earlier that year, Conyngham married Lady Iona Charlotte Grimston (born 1953), the youngest daughter of the 6th Earl of Verulam. They had one daughter:

- Lady Tamara Jane Conyngham (born 1991), married Cian Speers in 2023.

Lord Conyngham wrote an autobiography, Public Space–Private Life: A Decade at Slane Castle, in which he described his business career and the challenges of being an Anglo-Irish peer in modern Ireland and how being Anglo-Irish has gradually become more accepted in the Republic of Ireland.

He was a member of the Church of Ireland.

Lord Conyngham died at St. James's Hospital, Dublin, on 18 June 2025, aged 74. He had been diagnosed with lung cancer in 2014.

== Sources ==
- Public Space-Private Life: A Decade at Slane Castle, September 1989, Faber & Faber

<! -- ISBN#?? -->

Peerage of Ireland
Preceded by Frederick Conyngham	Marquess Conyngham; 2009–2025	Succeeded by Alexander Conyngham; 9th Marquess
