= George Conyngham, 3rd Marquess Conyngham =

British peer and soldier

Lieutenant-General The Most Honourable The Marquess Conyngham
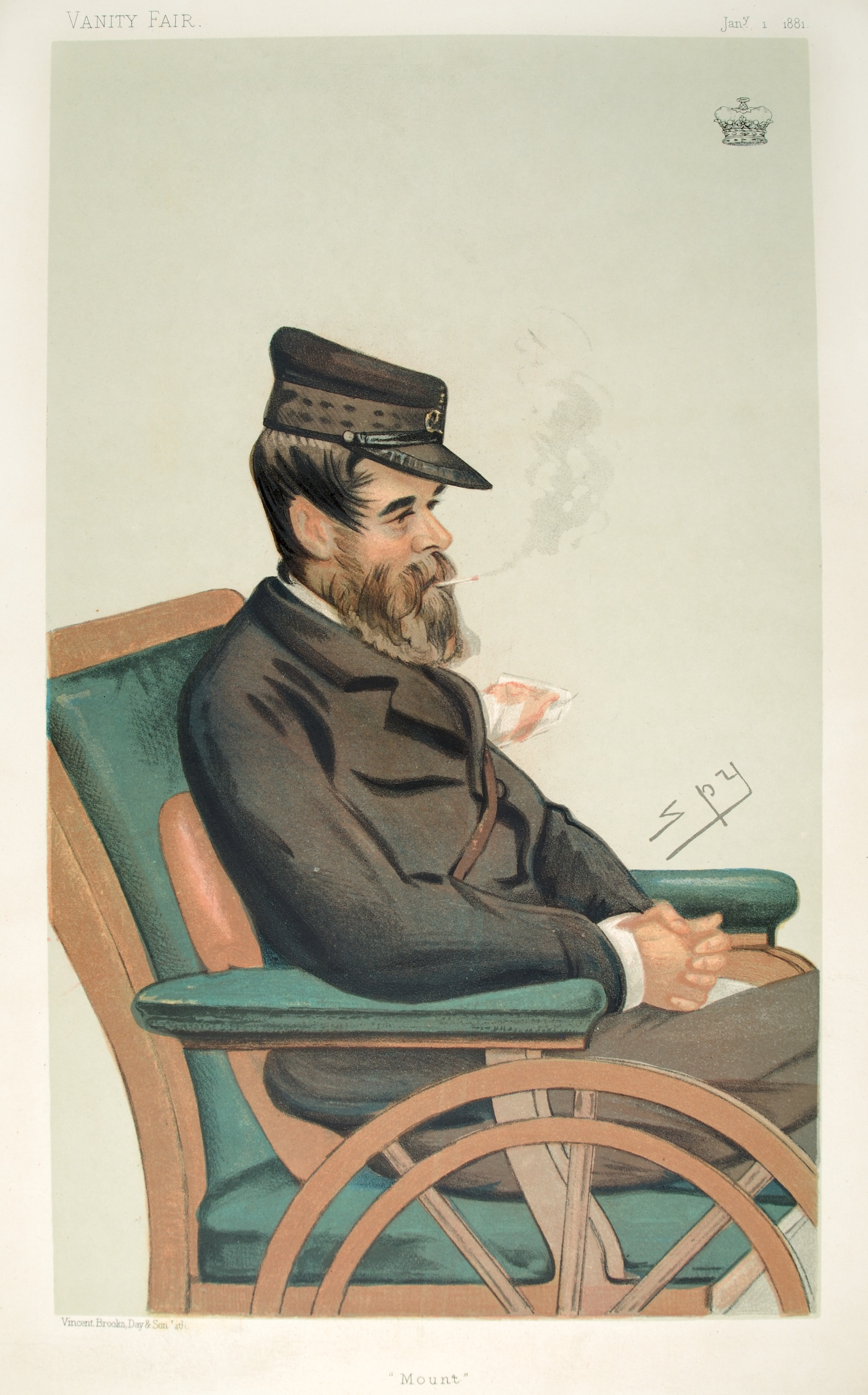
- "Mount". Caricature by Spy in Vanity Fair, 1 January 1881
- Born: George Henry Conyngham, Viscount Slane; 13 February 1825
- Died: 2 June 1882 (aged 57) Belgrave Square, London, England

George Henry Conyngham, 3rd Marquess Conyngham (3 February 1825 – 2 June 1882), styled Earl of Mount Charles from 1832 to 1876, was a British peer and soldier.

== Biography ==
He was born on 3 February 1825, the son and heir of Francis Nathaniel Conyngham, 2nd Marquess Conyngham, and was baptised at St James's Church, Westminster. He entered the Army as a cornet in the 2nd Regiment of Dragoons on 31 December 1844, and exchanged to be a cornet and sub-lieutenant in the 1st Regiment of Life Guards on 28 April 1848; on 19 October 1850 he was promoted to lieutenant. Besides his military career, Mount Charles served as State Steward to the Lord Lieutenant of Ireland (Lord Clarendon) from 1847 to 1852.

Mount Charles was promoted to captain in the 1st Life Guards on 4 August 1854 and to major and lieutenant-colonel on 24 August 1861. He served simultaneously in the militia, being appointed lieutenant-colonel of the disembodied Prince of Wales's Own Donegal Militia on 5 January 1849, and in the yeomanry, being made captain in the Royal East Kent Mounted Rifles on 20 April 1859, major on 24 June 1862 and lieutenant-colonel commandant on 2 February 1863. He was granted brevet rank as a full colonel on 24 August 1866 and went on half-pay on 13 June 1868. He was then an Equerry to the Queen from 1870 to 1872, when he was made an Extra Equerry. On 17 July 1876 he succeeded his father as Marquess Conyngham in the Peerage of Ireland and Baron Minster in the Peerage of the United Kingdom, and he took his seat in the House of Lords on 2 July 1877. In politics he was a Liberal. Like his father, he held the office of Vice-Admiral of Ulster. He was promoted to major-general on 1 October 1877 and retired with the honorary rank of lieutenant-general on 1 October 1881, with seniority later backdated to 1 July.

Conyngham died at the age of 57 on 2 June 1882, in Belgrave Square. He was buried at Patrixbourne. His widow died at The Mount, Ascot, on 28 November 1907, and was buried on 3 December at Bifrons.

He owned 166,000 acres including almost 10,000 in Kent, 122,000 acres in Donegal and 7,000 acres in Meath.

=== Family ===
On 17 June 1854 he married Lady Jane St Maur Blanche, only daughter and heiress of Charles Stanhope, 4th Earl of Harrington. They had seven children.

- Lady Blanche (1856-13 April 1946), unmarried.
- Henry Francis (1 Oct 1857-28 Aug 1897), who married the Hon. Frances Elizabeth Sarah Eveleigh-de Moleyns, daughter of Dayrolles Eveleigh-de-Moleyns, 4th Baron Ventry. They had seven children.
- Lady Constance Augusta (1859-14 June 1941), who married Richard Henry Combe, great-grandson of the Lord Mayor of London Harvey Christian Combe. They had one son, and four daughters, one of which married Major Hon. Francis Edward Needham, son of Francis Needham, 3rd Earl of Kilmorey. Youngest daughter Eileen married Philip Brian Martineau (1898 - 1983), son of Sir Philip Martineau.
- Lady Jane Seymour (1860-30 Oct 1941), who married Capt. Christian Combe, brother of Richard, her sister's husband. They had four children. Henry married Lady Moira Estelle Nora Frances, daughter of Rupert Charles Scott, 7th Earl of Clonmell. Winifred Phyllis firstly, married, Robert Lambart Dunville, great-grandson of Francis Conyngham 2nd Marquess Conyngham. She married secondly Hon. Francis Nathaniel Curzon, son of Alfred Curzon, 4th Baron Scarsdale. Second son was John Combe. Gladys Jean married Edward Chichester, 6th Marquess of Donegall.
- Lady Elizabeth Maud (1862-27 May 1949), who married Capt. Frederick William Ramsden, grandson of Sir John Ramsden, 4th Baronet and great-grandson of Edward Law, 1st Baron Ellenborough. They had issue including Charles, who married in 1922 Nathalia Pykhachyova, granddaughter of Justice Minister of Russia Dmitry Nikolaevich Nabokov. They had no issue.
- Lady Florence (d. 28 January 1946), who married Lt. Bertram Frankland Frankland-Russell-Astley, grandson of Sir Jacob Astley, 5th Baronet, Sir Robert Frankland-Russell, 7th Baronet and Louisa Ann Murray, daughter of the Bishop of St. David's Lord George Murray. They had a son, and daughter of which she married George Grenville Fortescue, grandson Adm. Sir William Legge Hoste, 2nd Baronet, and great-grandson of Hugh Fortescue, 1st Earl Fortescue and Dudley Ryder, 1st Earl of Harrowby. They had no known children. Secondly, Lady Florence Frankland-Russell-Astley married the Honourable Sir Claud Heathcote-Drummond-Willoughby, younger son of Gilbert Heathcote-Drummond-Willoughby, 1st Earl of Ancaster.
- Capt. Lord Charles Arthur (1 Feb 1871-7 March 1929) married twice, but had no children.

Peerage of Ireland
Preceded by Francis Conyngham	Marquess Conyngham; 1876–1882	Succeeded by Henry Conyngham
