= Henry Conyngham, Earl Conyngham =

Irish politician and noble

Henry Conyngham, 1st Earl Conyngham PC (1705 – 3 April 1781) was an Anglo-Irish nobleman and politician.

He was the second son of General Henry Conyngham of Slane Castle and his wife Mary Williams, daughter of Sir John Williams, 2nd Baronet, and widow of Charles Petty, 1st Baron Shelburne. He succeeded to the family estate on the death of his brother William.

An absentee landlord, he owned extensive properties in counties Meath and Donegal, while spending most of his time abroad. Despite being a British MP, he also controlled the pocket Irish constituency of Newtown Limavady and sat for Killybegs between 1727 and 1753.

In 1765 he was made a Privy Councillor of Ireland.

He married Ellen Merrett, daughter of Solomon Merrett and Rebecca Savage but had no children. On his death all his titles became extinct except Baron Conyngham, which passed by special remainder to his nephew Francis Burton, who adopted the surname Conyngham.

Parliament of Ireland
Preceded by Thomas Pearson; Robert Colvill	Member of Parliament for Killybegs; 1727–1753; With: William Conyngham 1727–39; Leslie Corry 1739–41; Henry Conyngham 1741–49; Henry Gore 1749–53	Succeeded by Henry Gore; Francis Pierpoint Burton
Parliament of Great Britain
Preceded by Sir Dudley Ryder; Sir William Yonge, Bt	Member of Parliament for Tiverton; 1747 – 1754; With: Sir Dudley Ryder	Succeeded by Sir William Yonge, Bt; Henry Pelham
Preceded by John Clevland; Claudius Amyand	Member of Parliament for Sandwich; 1756 – 1774; With: John Clevland 1756–61; George Hay 1761–68; Philip Stephens 1768–74	Succeeded by Philip Stephens; William Hey
Peerage of Ireland
New creation	Earl Conyngham; 1781	Extinct
New creation	Viscount Conyngham; 1756–1781	Extinct
New creation	Baron Conyngham; 1753–1781	Extinct
New creation	Baron Conyngham; 1781	Succeeded by Francis Conyngham
