= Joseph Denison (banker) =

English banker (c.1726–1806)

- Arms of Denison: Ermine, a bend azure cotised sable between a unicorn's head erased in chief and a cross crosslet fitchée in base gules
- Born: c. 1726; West Yorkshire
- Died: 12 December 1806 (aged 79); London
- Burial place: Bunhill Fields
- Occupation: Banker
- Children: William Joseph; Elizabeth; Anna Maria

Joseph Denison (c.1726–1806) was a London businessman and banker, originally from the present-day county of West Yorkshire. By the time of his death he had amassed a considerable fortune, and was owner of country estates in both Surrey and the North Riding of Yorkshire. These were passed on to his son William Joseph Denison, whose even greater accumulated wealth was to play a significant role in underpinning the financial standing and social status of the later Earls of Londesborough.

== Life ==
Denison had come from a simple background; his parents were of low ranking and little means in West Yorkshire. Definitive information is not available as to exactly how his fortune was made but seemingly he travelled to London where he became associated with the Heywood family of bankers, later becoming a partner in the company. Richard Vickerman Taylor described the immense wealth accumulated by Denison as being gained through "unabated industry and the most rigid frugality". Five years after purchasing Denbies, the Seamere (Seamer) estate, near Scarborough, Yorkshire, was added to his portfolio after he acquired it from the Duke of Leeds. Denison had a son, William Joseph, and two daughters, Elizabeth and Anna Maria from his second wife. By the time of the Regency era the family were the personification of prosperity and social status.

== Legacy ==
Denison died on 12 December 1806 and the estate and all other properties were inherited by his son. He is buried at Bunhill Fields with his second wife; a Grade II listed monument is on their tomb.
