= Henry Conyngham, 1st Marquess Conyngham =

Ulster Scots courtier and politician

The Most Honourable The Marquess Conyngham KP GCH PC FSA

Lord Steward
- In office December 1821 – 24 November 1830
- Monarch: George IV
- Prime Minister: The Earl of Liverpool; George Canning; The Viscount Goderich; The Duke of Wellington
- Preceded by: The Marquess of Cholmondeley
- Succeeded by: The Duke of Buckingham and Chandos

Personal details
- Born: 26 December 1766 London, England
- Died: 28 December 1832 (aged 66) Hamilton Place, London, England
- Spouse: Elizabeth Denison (m. 1794–1832)

Henry Burton Conyngham, 1st Marquess Conyngham, KP, GCH, PC, FSA (26 December 1766 – 28 December 1832), known as The Lord Conyngham between 1787 and 1789, as The Viscount Conyngham between 1789 and 1797 and as The Earl Conyngham between 1797 and 1815, was an Ulster Scots courtier and politician of the Regency period. He served as Lord Steward between 1821 and 1830.

== Background ==
Conyngham was born in London, England, the elder twin son of Francis Conyngham, 2nd Baron Conyngham, by his wife, Elizabeth Clements, daughter of Nathaniel Clements. He was the elder twin brother of Sir Francis Conyngham and the nephew of William Conyngham.

== Political career ==
Conyngham succeeded his father in the barony in May 1787, aged twenty. In May 1789, he was elected a Fellow of the Society of Antiquaries. In December of the same year, he was created Viscount Conyngham, of Slane in the County of Meath, in the Peerage of Ireland. He was further honoured when he was made Viscount Mount Charles, of Mount Charles in the County of Donegal, and Earl Conyngham, of Mount Charles in the County of Donegal, in the Irish peerage in 1797.

When the French Revolutionary War broke out in 1793, the Irish Parliament passed a Militia Act and Conyngham was tasked with raising the Clare Militia by compulsory parish ballots across County Clare. However, there were anti-ballot riots in the county: two attempts to carry out the ballot at Tulla were met with opposition. Conyngham gathered a force of volunteers and the opposition died away. He was then able to raise the regiment at Clarecastle. In 1797 he gave up the command and his twin brother Francis became Colonel of the regiment.

In August 1800, he was elected as one of the twenty-eight original Irish representative peers to sit in the British House of Lords.

He was made a Knight of St Patrick the following year (1801). In 1803, he was appointed Governor of County Donegal, a post he held until 1831, and Custos Rotulorum of County Clare in 1808, which he remained until his death.

In January 1816, he was created Viscount Slane, in the County of Meath, Earl of Mount Charles and Marquess Conyngham, of the County of Donegal, in the Irish peerage. In July 1821, he was created Baron Minster, of Minster Abbey in the County of Kent, in the Peerage of the United Kingdom.

In December 1821, he was sworn of the Privy Council and appointed Lord Steward, a post he retained until 1830.

From 1829 until his death in 1832, he served as Constable and Governor of Windsor Castle.

== Family ==
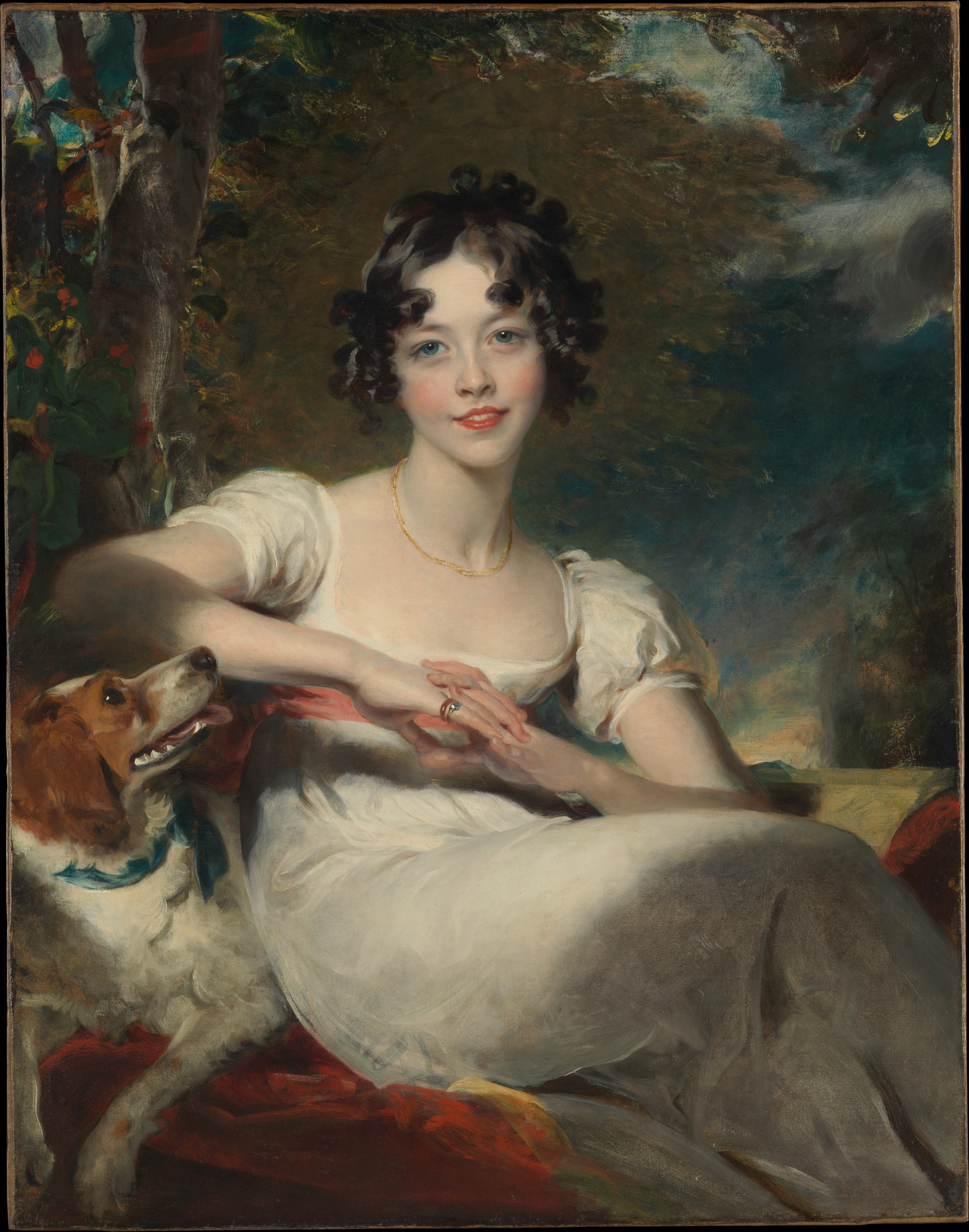
Portrait of Lady Maria Conyngham by Thomas Lawrence, 1825. Conyngham's younger daughter Maria.

In 1794, Lord Conyngham married Elizabeth Denison, daughter of the wealthy banker Joseph Denison and heiress to her brother, William Joseph Denison. They had three sons and two daughters who survived to adulthood.

- Henry Francis Conyngham, Earl of Mount Charles (1795–1824)
- Lady Elizabeth (born and died 30 August 1796), died as an infant
- Lord Francis (1797–1876), succeeded his father
- Lady Elizabeth Henrietta (16 February 1799 – 24 August 1839), married 10th Marquess of Huntly
- Hon. William Burton Conyngham (12 February 1804), died young
- Lord Albert (1805–1860)
- Unnamed son (4 February 1807), stillborn
- Lady Harriet Maria (2 July – 3 December 1843) married William Somerville, 1st Baron Athlumney
- Lady Charlotte (born and died 1812), died as an infant

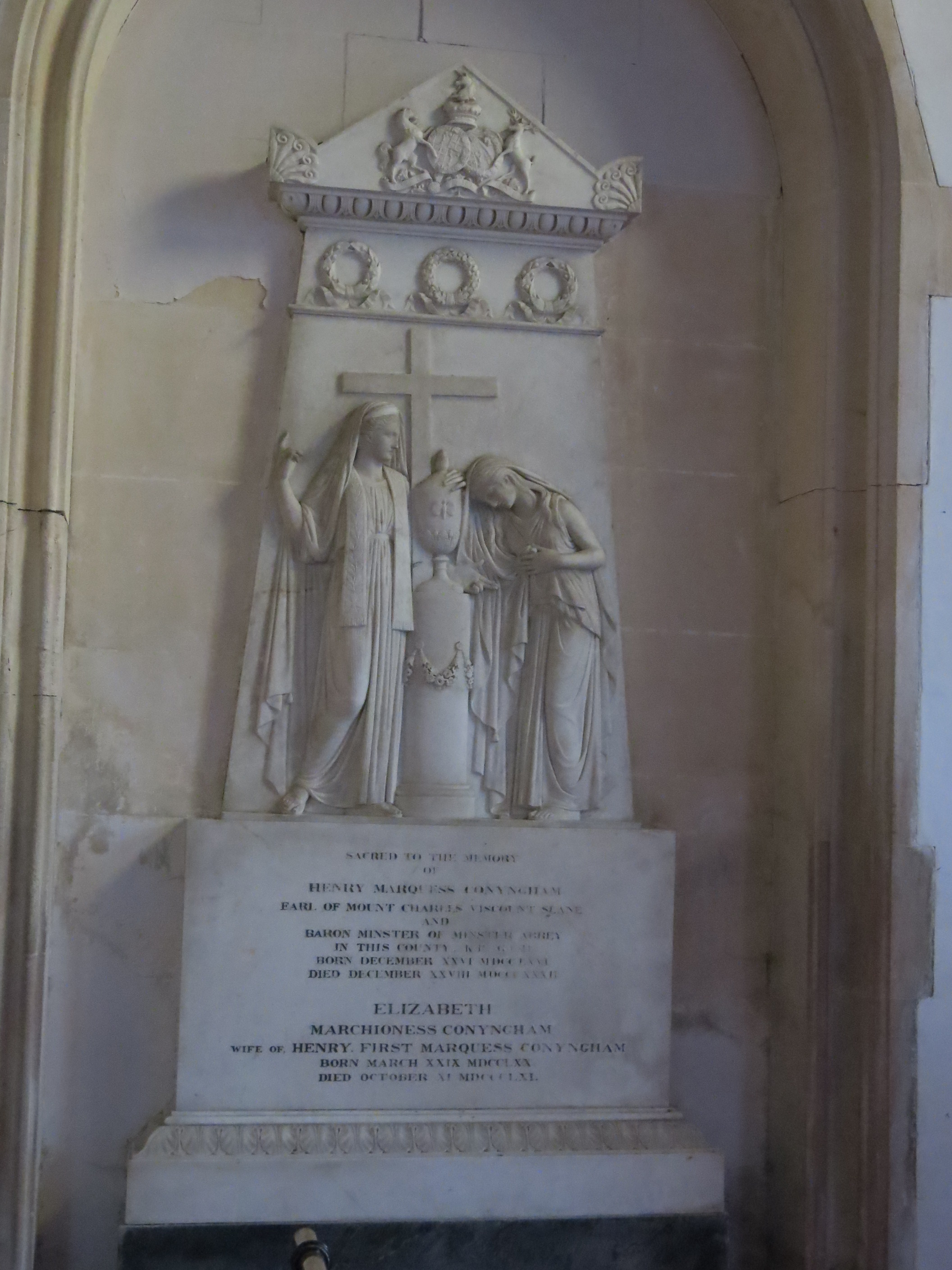
Memorial in Patrixbourne

Their third son, Lord Albert Conyngham, succeeded to the vast Denison estates on the death of his maternal uncle, assumed the surname Denison and was created Baron Londesborough in 1850. The Marchioness Conyngham was a mistress of George IV. Lord Conyngham died at Hamilton Place, London, in December 1832, aged 66, and was succeeded by his second but eldest surviving son. The Marchioness Conyngham died in Canterbury, Kent, in October 1861.

Political offices
| Preceded by The Marquess of Cholmondeley | Lord Steward; 1821–1830 | Succeeded by The Duke of Buckingham and Chandos |
| New office | Representative peer for Ireland; 1800–1832 | Succeeded by The Lord Downes |
Honorary titles
| Preceded by The Earl of Harrington | Constable and Governor of Windsor Castle; 1829–1832 | Succeeded by The Earl of Munster |
Peerage of Ireland
| New creation | Marquess Conyngham; 1816–1832 | Succeeded by Francis Conyngham |
| New creation | Earl Conyngham; 1797–1832 | Succeeded by Francis Conyngham |
| New creation | Viscount Conyngham; 1789–1832 | Succeeded by Francis Conyngham |
| Preceded by Francis Conyngham | Baron Conyngham; 1787–1832 | Succeeded by Francis Conyngham |
Peerage of the United Kingdom
| New creation | Baron Minster; 1821–1832 | Succeeded by Francis Conyngham |
