= Elizabeth Conyngham, Marchioness Conyngham =

English courtier and noblewoman (1770–1861)

The Most Honourable The Marchioness Conyngham
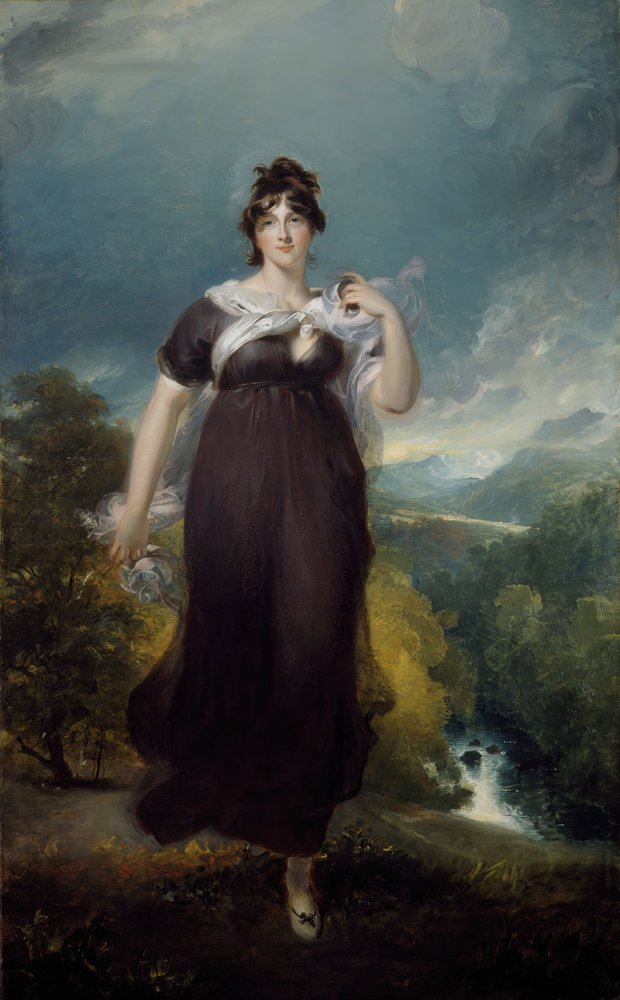
- Portrait of Countess Conyngham, 1802, by Thomas Lawrence. Birmingham Museum and Art Gallery, Birmingham
- Born: 29 March 1770
- Died: 11 October 1861 (aged 91); Canterbury, Kent, England
- Known for: Last mistress of King George IV
- Spouse: Henry Conyngham, Viscount Conyngham (m. 1794; died 1832)
- Parents: Joseph Denison (father); Elizabeth Butler (mother)
- Relatives: Henry Francis Conyngham, Earl of Mount Charles (son); Francis Conyngham, 2nd Marquess Conyngham (son); Albert Denison, 1st Baron Londesborough (son)

Elizabeth Conyngham, Marchioness Conyngham (née Denison; 29 March 1770 – 11 October 1861) was an English courtier and noblewoman. She is thought to be the last mistress of King George IV of the United Kingdom.

== Early life ==
She was born in 1769 (O.S.). Her father was Joseph Denison, owner of the Denbies estate in Surrey, who had made a fortune in banking. Her mother was Elizabeth Butler.

On 5 July 1794, Elizabeth married Henry Conyngham, Viscount Conyngham, an Irish peer. They had five children together, three sons and two daughters:

- Henry Francis Conyngham, Earl of Mount Charles (6 April 1795 – 26 December 1824)
- Francis Conyngham, 2nd Marquess Conyngham (11 June 1797 – 17 July 1876)
- Lady Elizabeth Henrietta Conyngham (died 24 August 1839), married Charles Gordon, 10th Marquess of Huntly
- Lady Maria Harriet Conyngham (1810 - died 3 December 1843), married William Somerville, 1st Baron Athlumney
- Albert Denison, 1st Baron Londesborough (21 October 1805 – 15 January 1860)

Despite her beauty, she was considered vulgar, shrewd, greedy, and unsuited to aristocratic society on account of her common background; however, she attracted lovers and admirers, including the Russian Grand Duke, the future Nicholas I.

== Royal mistress ==
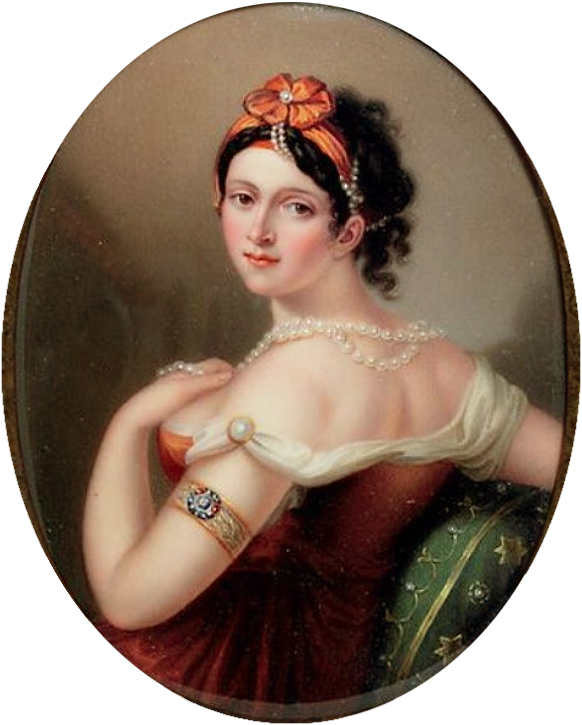
Elizabeth, Countess Conyngham

The Conynghams were not well connected, but according to the Duke of Wellington, Elizabeth decided as early as 1806 to become a mistress of the Prince of Wales, the future King George IV. She probably became his lover in 1819, when he was prince regent, but finally supplanted her predecessor, Isabella Seymour-Conway, Marchioness of Hertford, after he became king in 1820. He became besotted with her, constantly "kissing her hand with a look of most devoted submission." While his wife Caroline of Brunswick was on trial in 1820 as part of efforts to divorce her, the king could not be seen with Lady Conyngham and was consequently "bored and lonely." During his coronation, George was seen continually "nodding and winking" at her.

Lady Conyngham's liaison with the king benefited her family. In the coronation honours of 1821, her husband, already a marquess of Ireland, was created Baron Minster in the Peerage of the United Kingdom and sworn to the Privy Council. He was also given several other offices, including Lord Steward of the Household and the lieutenancy of Windsor Castle. Her second son was made Master of the Robes and First Groom of the Chamber.

Lady Conyngham had Whiggish sympathies, but usually did not concern herself with political ambition; she concentrated rather on furthering the financial position of her family. But on one occasion, she requested that her son's tutor be made Canon of St. George's Chapel, Windsor, and the prime minister, Lord Liverpool, threatened to resign over the matter. Arguments with Lady Castlereagh further worsened the relationship between the king and Lord Liverpool's government. She also disliked Benjamin Bloomfield, Keeper of the Privy Purse, and was successful in having him removed in 1822. His successor, William Knighton, was a close friend of the king who successfully cleared all his debts later in his reign. Dorothea Lieven, wife of the Russian ambassador, dismissed her with contempt as having "not an idea in her head...not a word to say for herself...nothing but a hand to accept pearls and diamonds, and an enormous balcony to wear them on."

== Later life and death ==
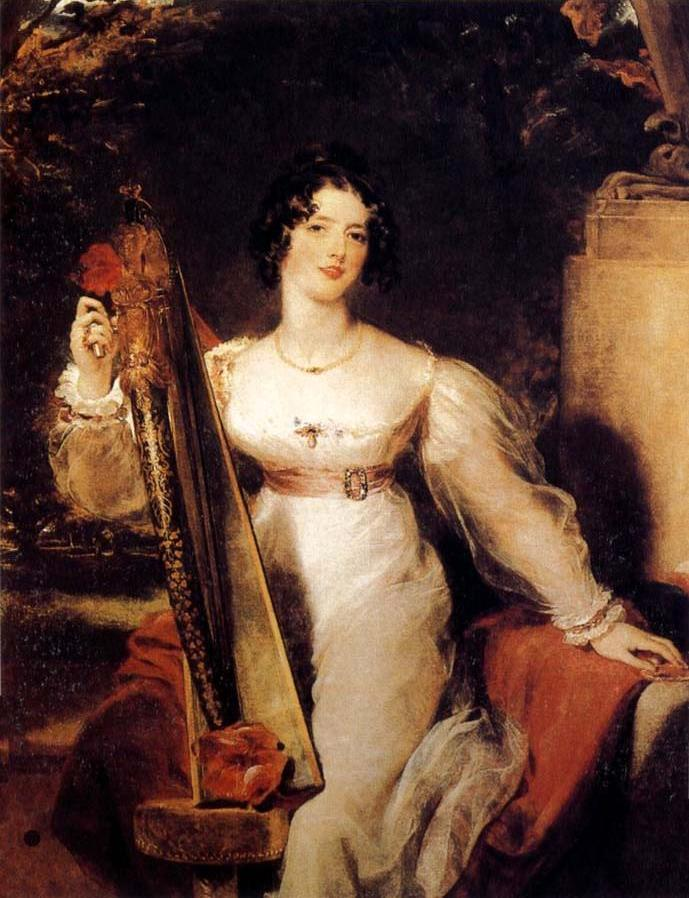
Portrait of Lady Elizabeth Conyngham, the Marchioness's daughter, commonly misidentified as the Marchioness herself. The portrait, painted by Sir Thomas Lawrence in the early 1820s, is in the Museu Calouste Gulbenkian, Lisbon.

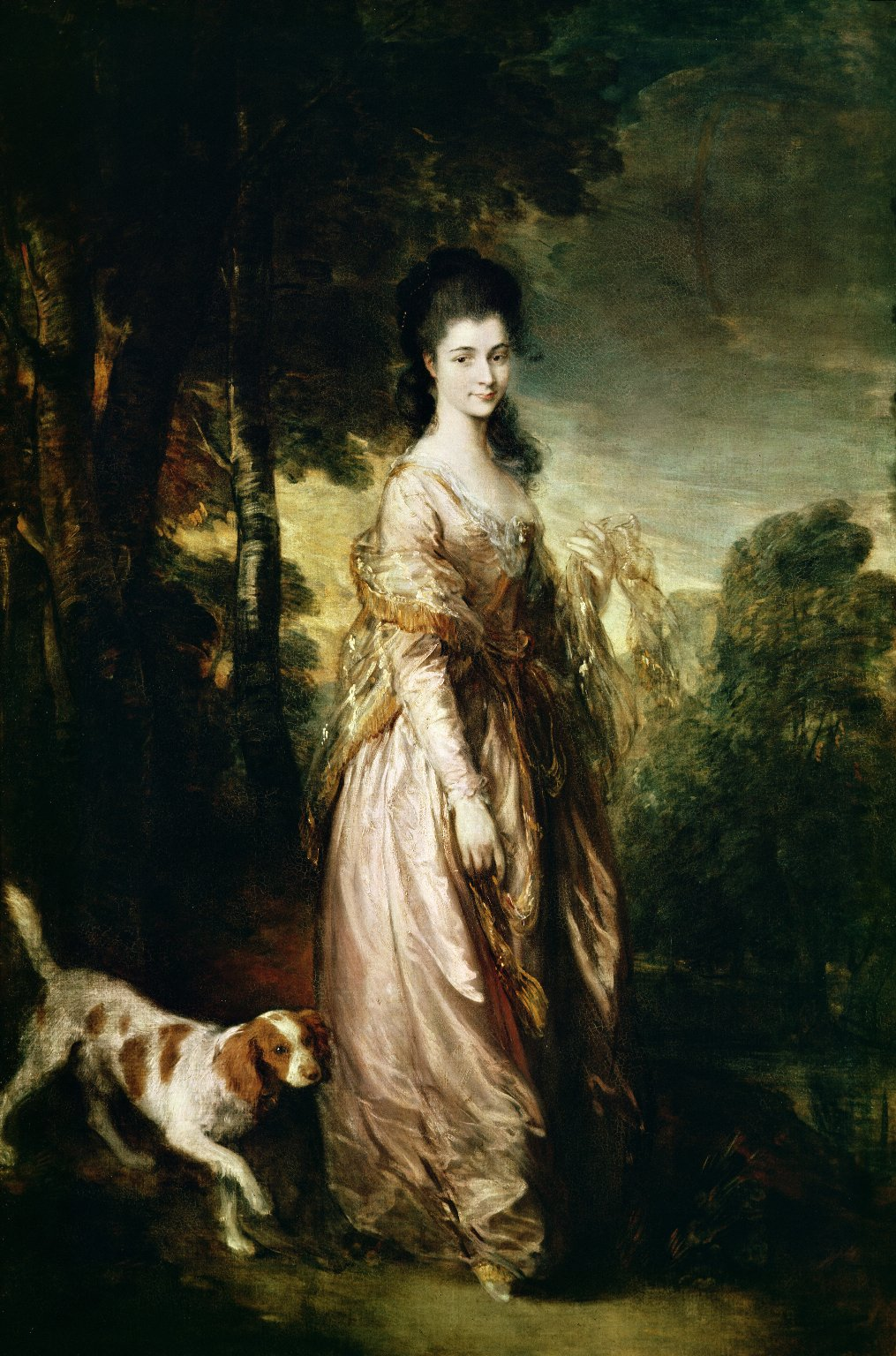
Another portrait commonly misidentified as the Marchioness, called "Lady Elizabeth Conyngham" and attributed to Sir Thomas Lawrence. In fact it is a 1775 portrait of Mrs. Lowndes-Stone by Sir Thomas Gainsborough, also located in the Museu Calouste Gulbenkian, Lisbon.

As his life progressed, the king became dependent on Lady Conyngham on account of his temper and poor health. However weary she became of his company, his affection for her never ceased. The relationship came to an end with George's sudden death in 1830; she immediately moved from Windsor Castle to Paris. Although the king had bequeathed her all his plate and jewels, she refused the entire legacy. The marquess broke his staff of office at George's funeral and was never to hold another one in the next reign. Lady Conyngham lived until 1861, dying near Canterbury at the age of 91. Although she was excluded from court during the reigns of King William IV and Queen Victoria, her son Francis Conyngham, 2nd Marquess Conyngham, was Lord Chamberlain to William. Along with William Howley, Archbishop of Canterbury, he brought the news of William's death to Princess Victoria and was the first to address her as Your Majesty. The 2nd Marquess's daughter, Jane Churchill, was later a Lady of the Bedchamber to Queen Victoria and one of her closest friends.

== See also ==
- List of English royal mistresses
- Hope Diamond (which Lady Conyngham is alleged to have stolen after the death of King George)

== Sources ==
- Smith, E. A. George IV, Yale University Press; new edition (February 1, 2001); ASIN 0300088027
- Smith, E. A. A Queen on Trial
- Trent, Christine (31 January 2012). By the King's Design (first ed.). Kensington. ISBN 978-0758265906.
