= Slane Castle =

18th-century building in Ireland

- Caisleán Bhaile Shláine
- Slane, Ireland
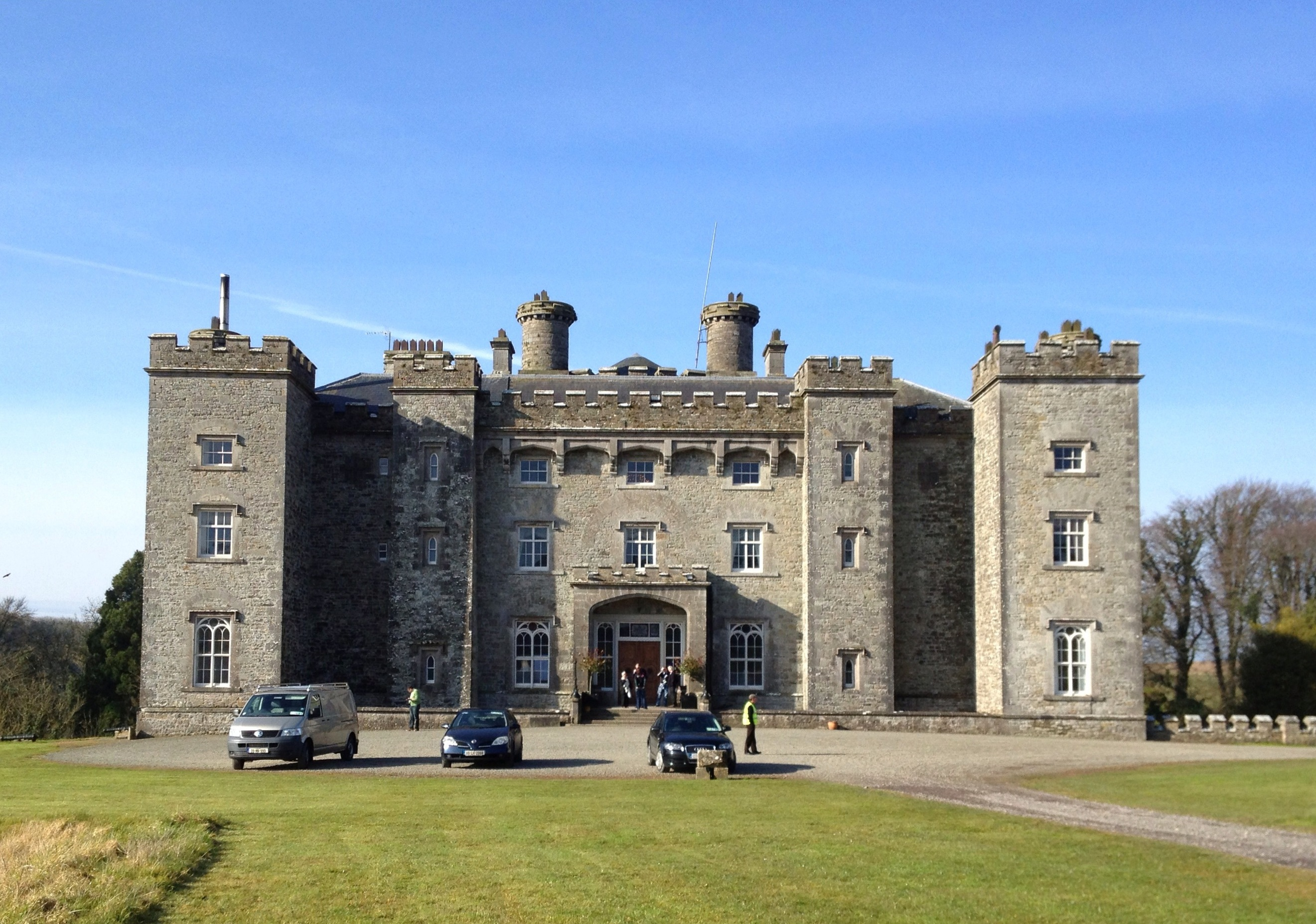
- Slane Castle seen from within its grounds

Site information
- Owner: The 9th Marquess Conyngham
- Controlled by: Slane Castle Ltd
- Open to the public: Yes

Location
- Location in Ireland##Location in Europe
- Location within Ireland Location within Europe
- Coordinates: 53.709°N 6.561°W

Site history
- Built: 1780s
- In use: Inhabited
- Events: Slane Festival

Slane Castle (Irish: Cáisleán Bhaile Shláine) is located in the village of Slane, within the Boyne Valley of County Meath, Ireland. The castle has been the family seat of the Conyngham family since it was built in the late 18th century, on land first purchased in 1703 by Brig.-Gen. Henry Conyngham.

It holds the Slane events within the surrounding gardens with the Irish Independent claiming in 2004 that "Slane today is the kind of internationally recognised venue that can claim even Madonna's attention". The grounds form a natural amphitheatre.

== History ==
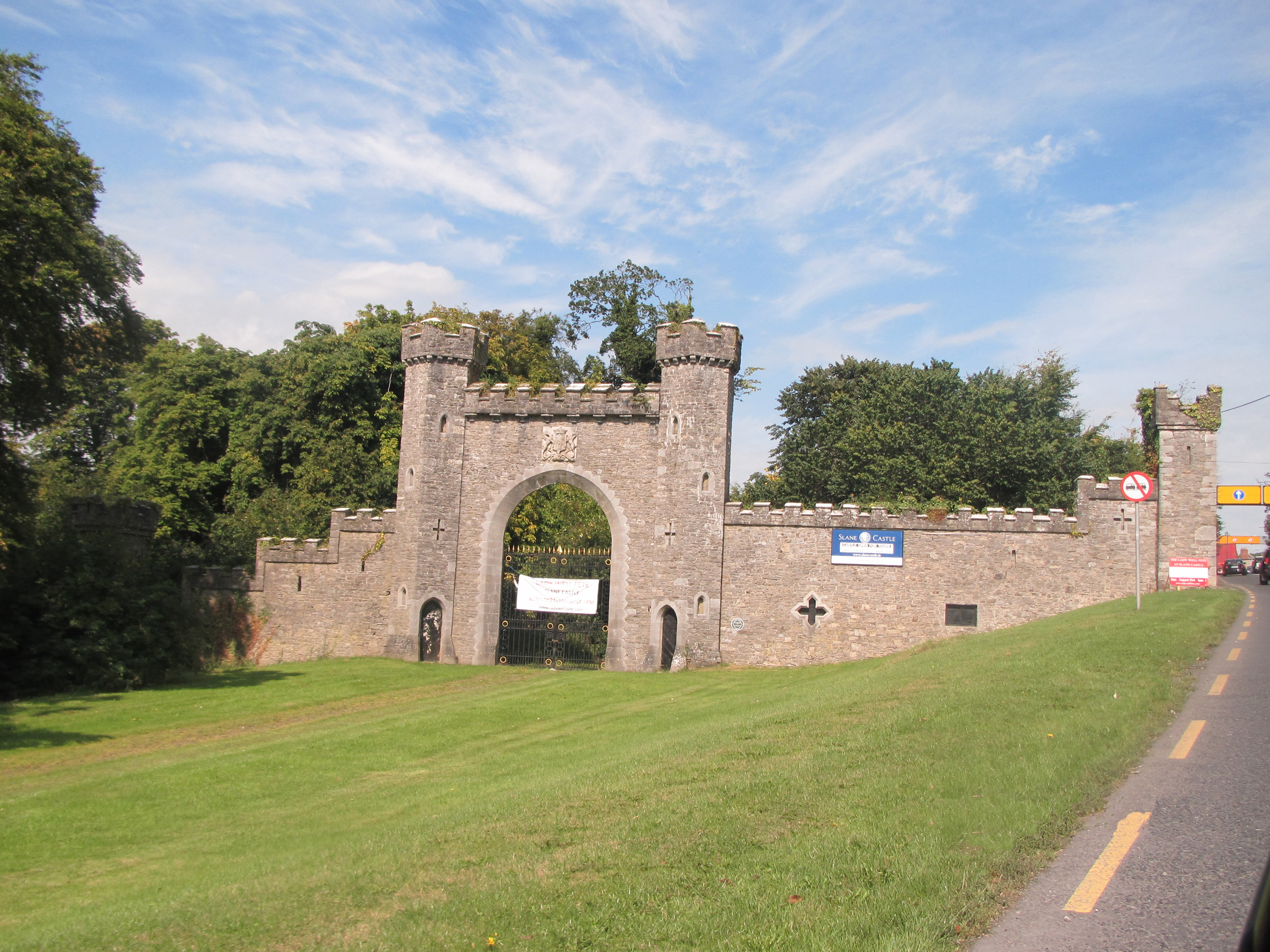
The former main gate into Slane Castle

On the eastward side of the castle demesne, directly between the River Boyne and the village's Church of Ireland church in Slane, lay the ruins of St. Erc's Hermitage, a 15th-century multi-storey chapel, and with some 500 metres westward of St. Erc's Hermitage an ancient well can also be found. In one of the central texts of Irish mythology, the Cath Maige Tuireadh, this well is said to have been blessed by the God Dian Cecht so that the Tuatha Dé Danann could bathe in it and be healed, allegedly healing all mortal wounds except decapitation. However, with the arrival of Christianity in Ireland, and the policy of Christian reinterpretation for traditionally pagan sites, the well is now more commonly referred to as Our Lady's Well.

Prior to the 1688 overthrow of the House of Stuart, Slane Castle had been in the possession of the Flemings, Hiberno-Normans who had aligned themselves with the Jacobites in the War of the Grand Alliance, and thus after the Williamite victory, their property was chosen for confiscation. Christopher, 17th Baron Slane (1669 – 14 July 1726; created The 1st Viscount Longford by Queen Anne in 1713), was the last Fleming Lord of Slane.

Overlooking the River Boyne, just a few kilometres upstream from Newgrange and the site of the famous Battle of the Boyne, Slane Castle in its existing form was constructed under the direction of William Burton Conyngham, together with his nephew The 1st Marquess Conyngham. The reconstruction dates back to 1785 and is principally the work of James Gandon, James Wyatt and Francis Johnston. Francis Johnston was also the architect responsible for the gothic gates on the Mill Hill, located to the east of the castle.

The Conynghams stem from Lady Katherine Conyngham family, who planted in Ireland in 1611, during the Plantation of Ulster in County Donegal. With that, the family asserted control over lands around the village of Tamhnach an tSalainn, near Donegal Town in the south of County Donegal. Concurrently, the then head of the family, Charles Conyngham, renamed the village in his own honour as Mountcharles (pronounced locally in South Donegal as 'Mount-char-liss'). The family also controlled an extensive estate in West Donegal, especially in The Rosses district.

The association between the Ulster-Scots Conynghams and the Slane Estate in County Meath dates back over 300 years, ever since the property was taken by the family following the Williamite Confiscations in 1701. Around that time, the family moved their main ancestral seat south from County Donegal in west Ulster to Slane.

The present owner of the castle is Alexander, 9th Marquess Conyngham - the eldest son of Lord Conyngham is Rory, Earl of Mount Charles.

In 1984, Irish band U2 took up residence at the castle to write and record their album The Unforgettable Fire.

In 1991, a fire in the castle caused extensive damage to the building and completely gutted the eastern section facing the River Boyne. The castle reopened in 2001 after the completion of a ten-year restoration programme. In 2003, a cannon associated with the castle was found in the nearby River Boyne.

In 2025, Slane Castle was chosen as the main filming location for the reality show The Traitors Ireland.

== Concerts at Slane ==
Since 1981, the grounds of Slane Castle have been used to host rock concerts. The natural amphitheatre has an 80,000 person capacity. The concerts were launched by the then Earl of Mount Charles (1951-2025; popularly known for several decades as Henry Mount Charles or Henry Mountcharles; from March 2009, he was known as The 8th Marquess Conyngham), the then owner of the castle.

Performers who have headlined Slane concerts since 1981 include Thin Lizzy, The Rolling Stones, U2, Guns N' Roses, Metallica, Red Hot Chili Peppers, Oasis, Queen, David Bowie, Neil Young, Bryan Adams, Bob Dylan, Bruce Springsteen, Robbie Williams, Madonna, R.E.M. On 28 May 2011, Kings Of Leon headlined the 30th anniversary event at Slane Castle. Harry Styles performed in June 2023.

Celtic Woman filmed their second DVD at Slane Castle, called Celtic Woman: A New Journey in August 2006, and in 2001 U2 filmed the DVD U2 Go Home: Live From Slane Castle, which was released in 2003. They also recorded their 1984 album, The Unforgettable Fire, there while taking up residence for a time. Red Hot Chili Peppers also have a concert DVD from their 2003 set at Slane. Parts of Madonna's documentary-film I'm Going to Tell You a Secret were filmed at Slane Castle in 2004. Bon Jovi performed at Slane Castle in June 2013.
