= Henry Conyngham, Earl of Mount Charles =

Irish Tory politician

Henry Joseph Conyngham, Earl of Mount Charles (6 April 1795 – 26 December 1824), was an Ulster Scots Tory politician. He was heir to the Marquessate of Conyngham but died before his father.

Conyngham was the eldest son of Henry Conyngham, 1st Marquess Conyngham, and his wife, the banking heiress Elizabeth Denison. He was educated in 1813 at Trinity College, Cambridge. He was a Tory Member of Parliament (MP) for County Donegal from 1818 until his death at the age of 29 in Nice, France. He died unmarried and with no issue, and was buried in Nice.

Parliament of the United Kingdom
| Preceded by Sir James Stewart, Bt\ George Vaughan Hart | Member of Parliament for County Donegal; 1818–1824; With: George Vaughan Hart | Succeeded by Earl of Mount Charles; George Vaughan Hart |
