= Henry Conyngham (soldier) =

Irish soldier and politician

Major General Henry Conyngham of Slane Castle (before 1681–1706) was an Irish soldier and politician.

He was a Member of Parliament in the Parliament of Ireland for Killybegs in 1692–93 and for County Donegal in 1695–99 and 1703–06.

Conyngham served during the reign of James II as a captain in Mountjoy's Regiment. He was promoted lieutenant-colonel of Robert Echlin's (formerly Sir Albert Conyngham's) Regiment of Dragoons on 31 December 1691 and appointed colonel of a newly raised regiment of dragoons on 1 February 1693. He was promoted to brigadier-general on 1 January 1703 and major-general on 3 April 1705. He served in Portugal and Spain during the War of the Spanish Succession, where he was Governor of Lerida and Lieutenant-General of the King of Spain's army. He was killed fighting the French at the Battle of St Estevan in January 1706.

== Family ==
He was the only surviving son of Sir Albert Conyngham and Margaret Leslie. By his wife Mary, widow of Charles Petty, 1st Baron Shelburne and daughter of Sir John Williams, 2nd Baronet, of Minster and Susan Skipwith, he had two sons, William (died 1738) and Henry Conyngham, 1st Earl Conyngham, and an only surviving daughter, Mary Conyngham, who married Francis Burton. Their son Francis Conyngham, 2nd Baron Conyngham, was an ancestor of the Marquesses Conyngham, who also inherited the Minster estate.
