= Albert Denison, 1st Baron Londesborough =

British Whig Party politician and diplomat

Arms of Denison: Ermine, a bend azure cotised sable between a unicorn's head erased in chief and a cross crosslet fitchée in base gules

Albert Denison Denison, 1st Baron Londesborough, KCH, FRS, FSA (né Conyngham; 21 October 1805 – 15 January 1860), was a British Whig Party politician and diplomat, known as Lord Albert Conyngham from 1816 to 1849.

== Early life and career ==
Born Albert Denison Conyngham at Stanhope Street, Mayfair, he was the third son of Henry Conyngham, 1st Marquess Conyngham, and Elizabeth Denison. He was educated at Eton, and was commissioned a cornet and sub-lieutenant in the Royal Horse Guards in 1821, before joining the diplomatic service. On 28 April 1826, he purchased an unattached infantry lieutenancy. In 1824, he was an attaché to Berlin, then Vienna in 1825, and Secretary of the Legation to Florence in 1828, and to Berlin, from 1829 to 1831.

Conyngham was knighted in 1829, and at the 1835 general election he was elected as Whig Member of Parliament for Canterbury, a seat he held until 1841, when he did not contest the election. He was elected unopposed at a by-election in March 1847 and held the seat until he was elevated to peerage in 1850. From 1844 to 1845, he served as first President of the British Archaeological Association, and from 1855 until his death as first President of the London and Middlesex Archaeological Society. He was sometime Vice-Admiral of the Yorkshire Coast.

In 1849, he changed his surname to Denison under the terms of the will of his maternal uncle, William Joseph Denison, and was created Baron Londesborough a year later. In 1851, he bought both Grimston Park, near Tadcaster, North Yorkshire, and the painting The Monarch of the Glen, the latter for £840.

== Marriage and issue ==
On 6 July 1833, Londesborough married Hon. Henrietta Marie Weld-Forester (a daughter of the 1st Baron Forester) and they had six children:

- Hon. William Henry Forester (1834–1900), created Earl of Londesborough
- Hon. Albert Denison Somerville (1835–1903)
- Hon. Henrietta Elizabeth Sophia (25 December 1836 – 15 July 1924), married Sir Philip Grey Egerton, 11th Baronet, and had issue, including Sir Philip Grey Egerton, 12th Baronet
- Hon. Selina Camerina Charlotte (29 December 1837 – 11 September 1852), died young
- Hon. Isabella Maria (12 April 1839 – 5 October 1856), died young
- Hon. Augusta Elizabeth (6 April 1841 – 20 January 1887), married Arthur Wrottesley, 3rd Baron Wrottesley, and had issue.

Londesborough's first wife died in 1841, and on 21 December 1847, he married Ursula Bridgeman (a daughter of Vice-Admiral Charles Orlando Bridgeman). They had seven children:

- Hon. Ursula Elizabeth (3 October 1848 – 23 April 1880), married Rev. George Cockburn Dickinson, son of Capt. Richard Dickinson
- Hon. Henry Charles (28 October 1849 – 23 July 1936), married Beatrice Mary Guthrie, daughter of James Alexander Guthrie, 4th of Craigie
- Hon. Conyngham Albert (5 March 1851 – 25 May 1938), married Evelyn Maud Webster, daughter of Charles Fox Webster
- Hon. Alberta (13 May 1853 – 31 May 1854), died in infancy
- Hon. Albertina Agnes Mary (22 September 1854 – 20 October 1929), who married Colonel Ivor Herbert, 1st Baron Treowen, in 1873. She founded and was the first President of the Ottawa Decorative Art Society. She was president of the Woman's Humane Society, and the first president of the Humane Society of Ottawa. She also had cabmen's shelters erected in Ottawa.
- Hon. Harold Albert (26 March 1856 – 2 January 1948), married Katherine Lister, daughter of Sir Thomas Villiers Lister. He was the father of Conyngham Denison, 7th Baron Londesborough and John Albert Lister Denison, 8th Baron Londesborough.
- Hon. Evelyn Albert (4 September 1859 – 17 January 1883); after an argument with his stepfather, Evelyn emigrated, first to Belgium in 1878, then to the United States, where he died in Denver from consumption.

== Death ==
Lord Londesborough died in 1860 and his title was inherited by his eldest son, William, who was later created Earl of Londesborough in 1887. His second wife later married Lord Otho FitzGerald.

Parliament of the United Kingdom
Preceded by Richard Watson; Viscount Fordwich	Member of Parliament for Canterbury; 1835–1841; With: Frederick Villiers 1835; Stephen Rumbold Lushington 1835–1837; James Bradshaw 1837–1841	Succeeded by James Bradshaw; George Smythe
Preceded by James Bradshaw; George Smythe	Member of Parliament for Canterbury; 1847–1850; With: George Smythe	Succeeded by George Smythe; Frederick Romilly
Honorary titles
Vacant Title last held by The Earl of Mulgrave	Vice-Admiral of Yorkshire; 1853–1860	Vacant
Peerage of the United Kingdom
New creation	Baron Londesborough; 1850–1860	Succeeded by William Denison
