= Hayes baronets of Drumboe Castle (1789) =

Escutcheon of the Hayes baronets of Drumboe Castle

The Hayes baronetcy, of Drumboe Castle in the County of Donegal, was created in the Baronetage of Ireland on 27 August 1789 for the landowner Samuel Hayes. He was an English surgeon in London, who married the heiress Mary Basil, daughter of William Basil of Wilton Park, and came into possession of the Drumboe estate. He represented Augher in the Irish House of Commons between 1783 and 1790.

The 3rd Baronet represented County Donegal in the Westminstet House of Commons, from 1832 to 1860. The title became extinct on the death of the 5th Baronet in 1912.

== Hayes baronets, of Drumboe Castle (1789) ==
- Sir Samuel Hayes, 1st Baronet (1737–1807)
- Sir Samuel Hayes, 2nd Baronet (1773–1827)
- Sir Edmund Samuel Hayes, 3rd Baronet (1806–1860)
- Sir Samuel Hercules Hayes, 4th Baronet (1840–1901)
- Sir Edmund Francis Hayes, 5th Baronet (1850–1912), left no heir.
