= Samuel Hayes =

Samuel or Sam Hayes may refer to:

- Samuel E. Hayes Jr. (born 1940), former member of the Pennsylvania House of Representatives
- Sir Samuel Hayes, 1st Baronet (1737–1807), MP for Augher and of the Hayes baronets
- Sir Samuel Hayes, 2nd Baronet (1773–1827)
- Sir Samuel Hercules Hayes, 4th Baronet (1840–1901)
- Samuel Hayes (settler) (1641–1712), early settler of Norwalk, Connecticut
- Samuel Snowden Hayes (1820–1880), Illinois politician
- Samuel W. Hayes (1875–1941), judge in Oklahoma
- Sam Hayes (footballer) (born 1999)

== See also ==
- Samuel Hays (disambiguation)
- Samuel Ross Hay (1865–1944), American Methodist bishop
- Samantha Hayes (born 1984), New Zealand journalist
