= 2013–14 RFU Championship =

English rugby season

2013–14 Greene King IPA Championship
- Countries: England; Jersey
- Date: 14 September 2013 – 4 June 2014
- Champions: London Welsh
- Runners-up: Bristol
- Relegated: Ealing Trailfinders
- Matches played: 138
- Attendance: 289,423 (average 2,097 per match)
- Highest attendance: 10,905 Bristol at home to London Welsh on 4 June 2014
- Lowest attendance: 473 Ealing Trailfinders at home to Nottingham on 12 April 2014
- Tries scored: 807 (average 5.8 per match)
- Top point scorer: (Argentina) Juan Pablo Socino (Rotherham) 300 points
- Top try scorer: (England) Miles Mantella (London Scottish) 19 tries

The 2013–14 RFU Championship, known for sponsorship reasons as the Greene King IPA Championship, was the fifth season of the professionalised format of the RFU Championship, the second tier of the English rugby union league system run by the Rugby Football Union. It was held between 14 September 2013 and 4 June 2014. It was contested by eleven English clubs and one from Jersey in the Channel Islands. It was also the first Championship season with a title sponsor, as the Rugby Football Union and Greene King Brewery reached a deal by which the brewery would become the competition's main sponsor from 2013–14 through to 2016–17.

After being promoted after an appeal in the previous season, London Welsh were relegated back into the RFU Championship after finishing last in the 2012-13 English Premiership. As a result of relegation, they remained at the Kassam Stadium in Oxford instead of returning to their home ground of Old Deer Park in London in order to strengthen their support base. London Welsh replaced Newcastle Falcons who were promoted into the English Premiership after winning the play-off final against Bedford Blues. Doncaster Knights were relegated to the 2013–14 National League 1 and were replaced by the champions of National League 1, Ealing Trailfinders who played in the RFU Championship for the first time.

The twelve clubs in the 2013–14 RFU Championship also participated in the 2013–14 edition of the British and Irish Cup along with clubs from Wales, Scotland and Ireland. Matches in the RFU Championship were broadcast on Sky Sports.

== Structure ==
The Championship's structure had all the teams playing each other on a home and away basis. In a change to previous years, this season commenced with an extra round of games in the "Greene King IPA Big Rugby Weekend". Matches were played on the weekend of 14 and 15 September with three double headers at neutral grounds: Saracens' Allianz Park, Doncaster's Castle Park and Exeter's Sandy Park.

The play–off structure remained the same as the previous year. The top four teams at the end of the home–and–away season qualified for the promotion play–offs, which followed a 1 v 4, 2 v 3 system. The winners had to meet the RFU's Minimum Standards Criteria in order to be promoted to the Premiership. If they had failed to meet the criteria, then there would have been no promotion from the RFU Championship. However, on 9 May 2014, the RFU announced that all four play-off participants had met the Minimum Standards Criteria, assuring that the champion would indeed be promoted to the 2014–15 Premiership. There was no relegation play–off; the bottom team was automatically relegated. Following an agreement with the RFU in 2012, each RFU Championship club received £355,000 in funding from the RFU for the season.

== Participating teams ==
Locations of the 2013–14 RFU Championship teams

| Club | Stadium | Capacity | Area |
|---|---|---|---|
| Bedford Blues | Goldington Road | 5,000 (1,700 seats) | Bedford, Bedfordshire |
| Bristol | Memorial Stadium | 12,100 | Bristol |
| Cornish Pirates | Mennaye Field | 4,000 (2,200 Seats) | Penzance, Cornwall |
| Ealing Trailfinders | Trailfinders Sports Ground | 3,020 (1,200 seats) | West Ealing, London |
| Jersey | St. Peter | 5,000 | Saint Peter, Jersey |
| Leeds Carnegie | Headingley Rugby Stadium | 20,250 | Leeds, West Yorkshire |
| London Scottish | Athletic Ground, Richmond | 4,500 (1,000 seats) | Richmond, London |
| London Welsh | Kassam Stadium | 12,500 | Oxford, Oxfordshire (Note: Despite being relegated from the Premiership at the end of the 2012–13 season, London Welsh remained at the Kassam Stadium in Oxford instead of returning to their home ground of Old Deer Park in London in order to strengthen their support base. However, they played two matches at their traditional home: against Moseley in Round 18 on 9 March 2014; against Nottingham in Round 23 on 26 April 2014) |
| Moseley | Billesley Common | 3,000+ | Birmingham, West Midlands |
| Nottingham | Meadow Lane | 19,588 | Nottingham, Nottinghamshire |
| Plymouth Albion | The Brickfields | 8,500 | Plymouth, Devon |
| Rotherham Titans | Clifton Lane; Abbeydale Park (Note: Rotherham would have to play their final league game and any playoff games at Abbeydale Park in Sheffield due to a dispute with Rotherham Cricket Club over ground sharing at Clifton Lane.) | 2,500; 3,300 (100 seats) | Rotherham, South Yorkshire; Sheffield, South Yorkshire |

== League table ==
2013–14 Greene King IPA Championship Table
| Pos | Team | Pld | W | D | L | PF | PA | PD | TB | LB | Pts | Qualification |
|---|---|---|---|---|---|---|---|---|---|---|---|---|
| 1 | Bristol (RU) | 23 | 19 | 0 | 4 | 786 | 505 | +281 | 18 | 3 | 96 (Note: Bristol were deducted 1 competition point for failing to reduce to 14 men when going to uncontested scrums against Bedford on 6 October.) | Promotion play-off |
| 2 | London Welsh (CH) | 23 | 19 | 0 | 4 | 724 | 348 | +376 | 10 | 2 | 88 | Promotion play-off |
| 3 | Leeds Carnegie (SF) | 23 | 18 | 0 | 5 | 700 | 387 | +313 | 10 | 2 | 84 | Promotion play-off |
| 4 | Rotherham Titans (SF) | 23 | 17 | 0 | 6 | 718 | 474 | +244 | 11 | 1 | 80 | Promotion play-off |
| 5 | London Scottish | 23 | 14 | 0 | 9 | 554 | 423 | +131 | 10 | 2 | 68 | |
| 6 | Cornish Pirates | 23 | 10 | 2 | 11 | 456 | 554 | −98 | 4 | 3 | 51 | |
| 7 | Moseley | 23 | 9 | 1 | 13 | 449 | 575 | −126 | 4 | 2 | 44 | |
| 8 | Plymouth Albion | 23 | 6 | 1 | 16 | 467 | 588 | −121 | 5 | 9 | 40 | |
| 9 | Bedford Blues | 23 | 7 | 0 | 16 | 472 | 624 | −152 | 5 | 5 | 38 | |
| 10 | Nottingham | 23 | 5 | 1 | 17 | 413 | 610 | −197 | 3 | 9 | 34 | |
| 11 | Jersey | 23 | 6 | 0 | 17 | 423 | 629 | −206 | 1 | 6 | 29 (Note: Jersey were deducted 2 competition points for fielding an ineligible player.) | |
| 12 | Ealing Trailfinders (R) | 23 | 5 | 1 | 17 | 365 | 810 | −445 | 5 | 1 | 28 | Relegation |

Updated to match(es) played on 5 June 2014. Source: RFU
Rules for classification: If teams are level at any stage, tiebreakers are applied in the following order:
1. Number of matches won
2. Difference between points for and against
3. Total number of points for
4. Aggregate number of points scored in matches between tied teams
5. Number of matches won excluding the first match, then the second and so on until the tie is settled
  Notes:

== Regular season ==
The 2013–14 RFU Championship kicked off on the weekend of 14 and 15 September with the "Greene King IPA Big Rugby Weekend", an extra round of matches played as three double headers at neutral grounds. Thereafter, each team played the other twice on a home and away basis with the top four qualifying for the promotion phase.

=== Round 1 (Big Rugby Weekend) ===
14 September 2013
13:00

| Ealing Trailfinders | 13 – 44 | London Scottish (BP) |
| | Ealing; Scottish |

Allianz Park
Attendance: 1,550
Referee: Darren Gamage

14 September 2013
13:00

| Moseley | 24 – 42 | Rotherham (BP) |
| | Rotherham; Moseley |

Castle Park
Attendance: 1,050
Referee: Ian Tempest

14 September 2013
15:15

| London Welsh | 23 – 14 | Bedford Blues |
| | Welsh; Bedford |

Allianz Park
Attendance: 1,550
Referee: Matthew Carley

14 September 2013
15:15

| Nottingham | 24 – 16 | Leeds Carnegie |
| | Nottingham; Leeds |

Castle Park
Attendance: 1,098
Referee: Greg MacDonald

15 September 2013
13:15

| Plymouth Albion (BP) | 41 – 27 | Jersey |
| | Plymouth; Jersey |

Sandy Park
Attendance: 3,752
Referee: Simon Harding

15 September 2013
15:30

| Cornish Pirates | 23 – 21 | Bristol (BP) |
| | Pirates; Bristol |

Sandy Park
Attendance: 3,752
Referee: David Rose

=== Round 2 ===
20 September 2013
19:45

| Cornish Pirates (BP) | 20 – 27 | Leeds Carnegie (BP) |
| | Pirates; Leeds |

The Mennaye
Attendance: 1,844
Referee: Ross Campbell

20 September 2013
19:45

| Plymouth Albion (BP) | 34 – 34 | Moseley (BP) |
| | Plymouth |

Brickfields
Attendance: 1,746
Referee: Matthew Carley

21 September 2013
15:00

| Jersey | 26 – 14 | Bedford Blues |
| | Jersey; Bedford |

St Peter
Attendance: 2,265
Referee: Luke Pearce

21 September 2013
15:00

| Rotherham (BP) | 79 – 9 | Ealing Trailfinders |
| | Rotherham; Ealing |

Clifton Lane
Attendance: 1,257
Referee: John Meredith

22 September 2013
15:00

| Bristol (BP) | 31 – 18 | London Scottish |
| | Bristol; Scottish |

Memorial Stadium
Attendance: 5,320
Referee: Greg MacDonald

22 September 2013
15:00

| Nottingham | 19 – 46 | London Welsh (BP) |
| | Nottingham; Welsh |

Meadow Lane
Attendance: 1,164
Referee: Ian Tempest

=== Round 3 ===
28 September 2013
14:30

| London Welsh (BP) | 40 – 9 | Plymouth Albion |
| | Welsh; Plymouth |

Kassam Stadium
Attendance: 999
Referee: Ross Campbell

28 September 2013
15:00

| Bedford Blues (2 BP) | 28 – 29 | Leeds Carnegie |
| | Bedford; Leeds |

Goldington Road
Attendance: 2,754
Referee: Steve Lee

28 September 2013
15:00

| Ealing Trailfinders | 17 – 31 | Cornish Pirates (BP) |
| | Ealing; Pirates |

Trailfinders Sports Ground
Attendance: 1,000
Referee: Matthew Carley

28 September 2013
15:00

| Jersey | 17 – 26 | Bristol (BP) |
| | Jersey; Bristol |

St Peter
Attendance: 2,590
Referee: Ian Tempest

28 September 2013
15:00

| London Scottish | 27 – 6 | Nottingham |
| | Scottish; Nottingham |

Richmond Athletic Ground
Attendance: 1,394
Referee: Simon Harding

28 September 2013
15:00

| Moseley | 21 – 47 | Rotherham (BP) |
| | Moseley; Rotherham |

Billesley Common
Attendance: 938
Referee: Greg MacDonald

=== Round 4 ===
4 October 2013
19:45

| Cornish Pirates (BP) | 28 – 13 | Moseley |
| | Pirates; Moseley |

The Mennaye
Attendance: 1,374
Referee: Simon Harding

4 October 2013
19:45

| Plymouth Albion (BP) | 20 – 22 | London Scottish |
| | Plymouth; Scottish |

Brickfields
Attendance: 1,904
Referee: Darren Gamage

4 October 2013
20:00

| Leeds Carnegie (BP) | 64 – 3 | Ealing Trailfinders |
| | Leeds; Ealing |

Headingley
Attendance: 2,194
Referee: Ian Tempest

5 October 2013
15:00

| Rotherham (2 BP) | 27 – 32 | London Welsh |
| | Rotherham; Welsh |

Clifton Lane
Attendance: 1,828
Referee: Steve Lee

6 October 2013
15:00

| Bristol (BP) | 45 – 27 | Bedford Blues (BP) |
| | Bristol; Bedford |

Memorial Stadium
Attendance: 4,817
Referee: Tim Wigglesworth

6 October 2013
15:00

| Nottingham (BP) | 19 – 22 | Jersey |
| | Nottingham; Jersey |

Meadow Lane
Attendance: 1,562
Referee: Ross Campbell

=== Round 5 ===
25 October 2013
19:30

| London Scottish (BP) | 23 – 24 | Rotherham |
| | Scottish; Rotherham |

Richmond Athletic Ground
Attendance: 1,103
Referee: David Rose

26 October 2013
14:30

| (BP) Jersey | 18 – 23 | Plymouth Albion |
| | Jersey; Plymouth |

St Peter
Attendance: 2,216
Referee: Martin Fox

26 October 2013
15:00

| Moseley | 18 – 27 | Leeds Carnegie (BP) |
| | Moseley; Leeds |

Billesley Common
Attendance: 774
Referee: Darren Gamage

26 October 2013
18:30

| (BP) London Welsh | 41 – 6 | Cornish Pirates |
| | Welsh; Pirates |

Kassam Stadium
Attendance: 1,203
Referee: Ian Tempest

27 October 2013
15:15

| (BP) Bedford Blues | 31 – 14 | Ealing Trailfinders |
| | Bedford; Ealing |

Goldington Road
Attendance: 1,923
Referee: Dean Richards

27 October 2013
15:15

| (BP) Bristol | 33 – 18 | Nottingham |
| | Bristol; Nottingham |

Memorial Stadium
Attendance: 5,071
Referee: Matthew Carley

=== Round 6 ===
1 November 2013
19:45

| Cornish Pirates | 16 – 8 | London Scottish |
| | Pirates; Scottish |

The Mennaye
Attendance: 1,449
Referee: Dean Richards

1 November 2013
19:45

| Ealing Trailfinders | 6 – 15 | Moseley |
| | Ealing; Moseley |

Trailfinders Sports Ground
Attendance: 692
Referee: Simon Harding

2 November 2013
14:00

| Rotherham | 25 – 16 | Jersey |
| | Rotherham; Jersey |

Clifton Lane
Attendance: 1,287
Referee: John Meredith

2 November 2013
15:00

| (2BP) Plymouth Albion | 31 – 38 | Bristol (BP) |
| | Plymouth; Bristol |

Brickfields
Attendance: 2,216
Referee: David Rose

3 November 2013
15:00

| (BP) Leeds Carnegie | 24 – 31 | London Welsh |
| | Leeds; Welsh |

Headingley
Attendance: 2,444
Referee: Steve Lee

3 November 2013
15:00

| Nottingham | 26 – 24 | Bedford Blues (BP) |
| | Nottingham; Bedford |

Meadow Lane
Attendance: 1,614
Referee: Darren Gamage

=== Round 7 ===
8 November 2013
19:45

| Ealing Trailfinders | 5 – 20 | Plymouth Albion |
| | Ealing; Plymouth |

Trailfinders Sports Ground
Attendance: 562
Referee: Greg MacDonald

9 November 2013
15:00

| Moseley | 29 – 15 | Nottingham |
| | Moseley; Nottingham |

Billesley Common
Attendance: 712
Referee: Craig Maxwell-Keys

10 November 2013
14:00

| (BP) London Scottish | 29 – 3 | Jersey |
| | Scottish; Jersey |

Richmond Athletic Ground
Attendance: 928
Referee: Thomas Foley

10 November 2013
14:30

| London Welsh | 22 – 7 | Bristol |
| | Welsh; Bristol |

Kassam Stadium
Attendance: 1,821
Referee: Tim Wigglesworth

10 November 2013
15:00

| Cornish Pirates | 16 – 13 | Bedford Blues (BP) |
| | Pirates; Bedford |

The Mennaye
Attendance: 1,609
Referee: Simon Harding

10 November 2013
15:00

| Leeds Carnegie | 19 – 10 | Rotherham |
| | Leees; Rotherham |

Headingley
Attendance: 2,345
Referee: Ross Campbell

=== Round 8 ===
15 November 2013
19:45

| Bedford Blues | 13 – 26 | Moseley |
| | Bedford; Moseley |

Goldington Road
Attendance: 2,545
Referee: Ross Campbell

16 November 2013
12:30

| London Scottish | 26 – 15 | Leeds Carnegie |
| | Scottish; Leeds |

Richmond Athletic Ground
Attendance: 797
Referee: John Meredith

16 November 2013
15:00

| Jersey | 27 – 25 | Cornish Pirates (BP) |
| | Jersey; Pirates |

St Peter
Attendance: 2,185
Referee: Matthew Carley

17 November 2013
14:30

| (BP) London Welsh | 28 – 0 | Ealing Trailfinders |
| | Welsh; Ealing |

Kassam Stadium
Attendance: 1,004
Referee: Craig Maxwell-Keys

17 November 2013
15:00

| (BP) Bristol | 36 – 26 | Rotherham |
| | Bristol; Rotherham |

Memorial Stadium
Attendance: 4,655
Referee: Tom Foley

17 November 2013
15:00

| Nottingham | 15 – 10 | Plymouth Albion (BP) |
| | Nottingham; Plymouth |

Meadow Lane
Attendance: 1,261
Referee: Dean Richards

=== Round 9 ===
22 November 2013
19:45

| Plymouth Albion | 16 – 27 | Bedford Blues |
| | Plymouth; Bedford |

Brickfields
Attendance: 1,548
Referee: Ian Tempest

23 November 2013
14:00

| Rotherham | 17 – 11 | Nottingham (BP) |
| | Rotherham; Nottingham |

Clifton Lane
Attendance: 1,390
Referee: Greg MacDonald

23 November 2013
15:00

| Moseley | 8 – 24 | London Welsh |
| | Moseley; Welsh |

Billesley Common
Attendance: 1,081
Referee: Darren Gamage

24 November 2013
15:00

| Cornish Pirates | 21 – 15 | Bristol (BP) |
| | Pirates; Bristol |

The Mennaye
Attendance: 2,176
Referee: John Meredith

24 November 2013
15:00

| Ealing Trailfinders | 10 – 36 | London Scottish (BP) |
| | Ealing; Scottish |

Trailfinders Sports Ground
Attendance: 669
Referee: Ross Campbell

24 November 2013
15:00

| Leeds Carnegie | 29 – 13 | Jersey |
| | Leeds; Jersey |

Headingley
Attendance: 2,120
Referee: Steve Lee

=== Round 10 ===
29 November 2013
19:45

| Plymouth Albion | 17 – 28 | Rotherham |
| | Plymouth; Rotherham |

Brickfields
Attendance: 1,349
Referee: Tom Foley

30 November 2013
14:30

| Jersey | 18 – 28 | Ealing Trailfinders (BP) |
| | Jersey; Ealing |

St Peter
Attendance: 1,902
Referee: Darren Gamage

30 November 2013
15:00

| Bedford Blues | 28 – 26 | London Welsh (BP) |
| | Bedford; Welsh |

Goldington Road
Attendance: 2,599
Referee: John Meredith

30 November 2013
15:00

| (BP) London Scottish | 38 – 17 | Moseley |
| | Scottish; Moseley |

Richmond Athletic Ground
Attendance: 1,128
Referee: Steve Lee

1 December 2013
15:00

| (2BP) Bristol | 22 – 28 | Leeds Carnegie (BP) |
| | Bristol; Leeds |

Memorial Stadium
Attendance: 5,029
Referee: Greg MacDonald

1 December 2013
15:00

| Nottingham | 27 – 27 | Cornish Pirates |
| | Nottingham; Pirates |

Meadow Lane
Attendance: 1,229
Referee: Ross Cambell

=== Round 11 ===
21 December 2013
14:30

| London Welsh | 5 – 13 | London Scottish |
| | Welsh; Scottish |

Kassam Stadium
Attendance: 1,359
Referee: Ian Tempest

21 December 2013
15:00

| Ealing Trailfinders | 7 – 21 | Bristol |
| | Ealing; Bristol |

Trailfinders Sports Ground
Attendance: 724
Referee: Simon Harding

21 December 2013
15:00

| Moseley | 10 – 3 | Jersey (BP) |
| | Moseley; Jersey |

Billesley Common
Attendance: 948
Referee: Ross Campbell

26 December 2013
14:00

| (BP) Rotherham | 35 – 6 | Bedford Blues |
| | Rotherham; Bedford |

Clifton Lane
Attendance: 2,217
Referee: Steve Lee

26 December 2013
15:00

| Cornish Pirates | 10 – 3 | Plymouth Albion (BP) |
| | Pirates; Plymouth |

The Mennaye
Attendance: 3,050
Referee: Darren Gamage

28 December 2013
15:00

| (BP) Leeds Carnegie | 30 – 19 | Nottingham |
| | Leeds; Nottingham |

Headingley
Attendance: 3,168
Referee: Dean Richards

=== Round 12 ===
28 December 2013
15:00

| (BP) Bristol | 29 – 8 | Moseley |
| | Bristol; Moseley |

Memorial Stadium
Attendance: 6,860
Referee: Thomas Foley

1 January 2014
15:00

| Bedford Blues | 21 – 13 | London Scottish |
| | Bedford; Scottish |

Goldington Road
Attendance: 2,555
Referee: John Meredith

4 January 2014
14:00

| (BP) Jersey | 26 – 33 | London Welsh |
| | Jersey; Welsh |

St Peter
Attendance: 1,617
Referee: Greg MacDonald

4 January 2014
14:00

| (BP) Rotherham | 35 – 30 | Cornish Pirates (BP) |
| | Rotherham; Pirates |

Clifton Lane
Attendance: 1,735
Referee: Tim Wigglesworth

4 January 2014
15:00

| (BP) Plymouth Albion | 14 – 15 | Leeds Carnegie |
| | Plymouth; Leeds |

Brickfields
Attendance: 1,835
Referee: Martin Fox

5 January 2014
15:00

| (2 BP) Nottingham | 27 – 28 | Ealing Trailfinders |
| | Nottingham; Ealing |

Meadow Lane
Attendance: 1,367
Referee: Craig Maxwell-Keys

=== Round 13 ===
25 January 2014
15:00

| Bedford Blues | 14 – 9 | Nottingham (BP) |
| | Bedford; Nottingham |

Goldington Road
Attendance: 2,189
Referee: Ross Campbell

25 January 2014
15:00

| Jersey | 22 – 35 | Rotherham (BP) |
| | Jersey; Rotherham |

St Peter
Attendance: 2,044
Referee: John Meredith

25 January 2014
15:00

| (BP) London Scottish | 25 – 6 | Cornish Pirates |
| | Scottish; Pirates |

Richmond Athletic Ground
Attendance: 1,675
Referee: Craig Maxwell-Keys

25 January 2014
15:00

| (BP) Moseley | 22 – 12 | Ealing Trailfinders |
| | Moseley; Ealing |

Billesley Common
Attendance: 700
Referee: Thomas Foley

26 January 2014
14:30

| London Welsh | 19 – 10 | Leeds Carnegie |
| | Welsh; Leeds |

Kassam Stadium
Attendance: 1,538
Referee: Martin Fox

26 January 2014
15:00

| Bristol | P – P | Plymouth Albion |

Memorial Stadium
Referee: Andrew Jackson

- This match was postponed due to a waterlogged pitch. It was rescheduled to 23 February.

=== Round 14 ===
31 January 2014
20:00

| Nottingham | 15 – 3 | London Scottish |
| | Nottingham; Scottish |

Meadow Lane
Attendance: 1,197
Referee: Andrew Small

1 February 2014
14:00

| Rotherham | 16 – 6 | Moseley |
| | Rotherham; Moseley |

Clifton Lane
Attendance: 1,287
Referee: Dean Richards

1 February 2014
15:00

| (BP) Plymouth Albion | 36 – 15 | London Welsh |
| | Plymouth; Welsh |

Brickfields
Attendance: 2,024
Referee: Craig Maxwell-Keys

2 February 2014
14:00

| Cornish Pirates | 18 – 18 | Ealing Trailfinders |
| | Pirates; Ealing |

The Mennaye
Attendance: 1,127
Referee: Luke Pearce

2 February 2014
15:00

| (BP) Bristol | 54 – 14 | Jersey |
| | Bristol; Jersey |

Memorial Stadium
Attendance: 4,657
Referee: Francisco Pastrana (UAR)

2 February 2014
15:00

| (BP) Leeds Carnegie | 50 – 6 | Bedford Blues |
| | Leeds; Bedford |

Headingley
Attendance: 2,086
Referee: Tim Wigglesworth

=== Round 15 ===
7 February 2014
19:30

| Moseley | P – P | Cornish Pirates |

Billesley Common

- This match was postponed, as the surface of many parts of the pitch is under water. It has been rescheduled to 21 February.

8 February 2014
14:30

| (BP) London Scottish | 38 – 27 | Plymouth Albion (BP) |
| | Scottish; Plymouth |

Richmond Athletic Ground
Attendance: 819
Referee: David Procter

8 February 2014
15:00

| Bedford Blues | 19 – 32 | Bristol (BP) |
| | Bedford; Bristol |

Goldington Road
Attendance: 2,009
Referee: Darren Gamage

8 February 2014
15:00

| Ealing Trailfinders | 11 – 46 | Leeds Carnegie (BP) |
| | Ealing; Leeds |

Trailfinders Sports Ground
Attendance: 631
Referee: Greg MacDonald

8 February 2014
15:00

| Jersey | 17 – 13 | Nottingham (BP) |
| | Jersey; Nottingham |

St Peter
Attendance: 1,592
Referee: Craig Maxwell-Keys

9 February 2014
14:30

| (BP) London Welsh | 47 – 16 | Rotherham |
| | Welsh; Rotherham |

Kassam Stadium
Attendance: 1,061
Referee: Steve Lee

=== Round 16 ===
14 February 2014
19:45

| Ealing Trailfinders | P – P | Bedford Blues |

Trailfinders Sports Ground

- This match was postponed as the pitch was deemed unplayable. It has been rescheduled to 22 February.

15 February 2014
14:00

| Rotherham | 15 – 12 | London Scottish (BP) |
| | Rotherham; Scottish |

Clifton Lane
Attendance: 1,342
Referee: Greg MacDonald

15 February 2014
15:00

| Plymouth Albion | P – P | Jersey |

Brickfields

- This match was postponed due to a waterlogged pitch.

16 February 2014
15:00

| Cornish Pirates | P – P | London Welsh |

The Mennaye

- This match was postponed after a pitch inspection at The Mennaye. It has been rescheduled to 16 March.

16 February 2014
15:00

| (BP) Leeds Carnegie | 62 – 5 | Moseley |
| | Leeds |

Headingley
Attendance: 3,902
Referee: Andrew Jackson

16 February 2014
15:00

| (BP) Nottingham | 24 – 25 | Bristol |
| | Nottingham; Bristol |

Meadow Lane
Attendance: 1,305
Referee: John Meredith

=== Postponed matches ===
21 February 2014
19:30

| Moseley | 28 – 20 | Cornish Pirates |
| | Pirates |

Billesley Common
Attendance: 626
Referee: Ross Campbell

- This match – originally scheduled to be played in Round 15 on 7 February 2014 – was postponed as many parts of the pitch was under water.

22 February 2014
14:00

| Ealing Trailfinders | P – P | Bedford Blues |

Trailfinders Sports Ground

- This match – originally scheduled to be played in Round 16 on 14 February 2014 – was postponed as the pitch was deemed unplayable. The match was again postponed due to an unplayable pitch. It will now be played on 15 March.

23 February 2014
15:00

| (BP) Bristol | 43 – 12 | Plymouth Albion |
| | Bristol; Plymouth |

Memorial Stadium
Attendance: 4,408
Referee: Craig Maxwell-Keys

- This match – originally scheduled to be played in Round 13 on 26 January 2014 – was postponed due to a waterlogged pitch.

=== Round 17 ===
28 February 2014
19:45

| Plymouth Albion | 22 – 12 | Nottingham |
| | Plymouth; Nottingham |

Brickfields
Attendance: 1,436
Referee: Steve Lee

1 March 2014
15:00

| Ealing Trailfinders | 6 – 39 | London Welsh (BP) |
| | Ealing; Welsh |

Trailfinders Sports Ground
Attendance: 1,571
Referee: Andrew Jackson

1 March 2014
15:00

| Moseley | 24 – 13 | Bedford Blues |
| | Moseley; Bedford |

Billesley Common
Attendance: 1,090
Referee: Craig Maxwell-Keys

1 March 2014
15:00

| Rotherham | 26 – 34 | Bristol (BP) |
| | Rotherham; Bristol |

Clifton Lane
Attendance: 2,349
Referee: Ian Tempest

2 March 2014
15:00

| Cornish Pirates | 19 – 15 | Jersey (BP) |
| | Pirates; Jersey |

The Mennaye
Attendance: 1,183
Referee: Greg MacDonald

2 March 2014
15:00

| Leeds Carnegie | 27 – 18 | London Scottish |
| | Leeds; Scottish |

Headingley
Attendance: 1,960
Referee: Darren Gamage

=== Round 18 ===
8 March 2014
15:00

| Bedford Blues | 18 – 33 | Plymouth Albion |
| | Bedford; Plymouth |

Goldington Road
Attendance: 2,199
Referee: Greg MacDonald

8 March 2014
15:00

| (BP) Jersey | 13 – 18 | Leeds Carnegie |
| | Jersey; Leeds |

St Peter
Attendance: 2,012
Referee: Martin Fox

9 March 2014
12:00

| (BP) London Welsh | 42 – 18 | Moseley |
| | Welsh |

Old Deer Park
Attendance: 2,006
Referee: Dean Richards

9 March 2014
12:30

| (BP) London Scottish | 42 – 13 | Ealing Trailfinders |
| | Scottish; Ealing |

Richmond Athletic Ground
Attendance: 856
Referee: Thomas Foley

9 March 2014
13:00

| (BP) Bristol | 46 – 33 | Cornish Pirates (BP) |
| | Bristol; Pirates |

Memorial Stadium
Attendance: 5,035
Referee: John Meredith

9 March 2014
13:00

| Nottingham | 7 – 51 | Rotherham |
| | Nottingham; Rotherham |

Meadow Lane
Attendance: 1,329
Referee: Darren Gamage

=== Postponed matches (2) ===
15 March 2014
15:00

| Ealing Trailfinders | 23 – 39 | Bedford Blues (BP) |
| | Ealing; Bedford |

Trailfinders Sports Ground
Attendance: 528
Referee: John Meredith

- This match – originally scheduled to be played in Round 16 on 14 February 2014 – was postponed as the pitch was deemed unplayable. The pitch was again found to be unplayable on the new date of 22 February, and the match was postponed for the second time.

15 March 2014
15:00

| (BP) Plymouth Albion | 23 – 30 | Jersey |
| | Plymouth; Jersey |

Brickfields
Attendance: 1,036
Referee: Craig Maxwell-Keys

- This match – originally scheduled to be played in Round 16 on 15 February 2014 – was postponed due to a waterlogged pitch.

16 March 2014
15:00

| Cornish Pirates | 5 – 20 | London Welsh |
| | Pirates; Welsh |

The Mennaye
Attendance: 1,387
Referee: Martin Fox

- This match – originally scheduled to be played in Round 16 on 16 February 2014 – was postponed after a pitch inspection at The Mennaye.

=== Round 19 ===
21 March 2014
19:45

| Ealing Trailfinders | 25 – 23 | Jersey (BP) |
| | Ealing; Jersey |

Trailfinders Sports Ground
Attendance: 843
Referee: Matthew Carley

22 March 2014
15:00

| (BP) Moseley | 20 – 23 | London Scottish |
| | Moseley; Scottish |

Billesley Common
Attendance: 902
Referee: Andrew Jackson

22 March 2014
15:00

| (BP) Rotherham | 45 – 10 | Plymouth Albion |
| | Rotherham; Plymouth |

Clifton Lane
Attendance: 1,386
Referee: Martin Fox

23 March 2014
14:30

| (BP) London Welsh | 29 – 11 | Bedford Blues |
| | Welsh; Bedford |

Kassam Stadium
Attendance: 1,353
Referee: Darren Gamage

23 March 2014
15:00

| Cornish Pirates | 17 – 11 | Nottingham (BP) |
| | Pirates; Nottingham |

The Mennaye
Attendance: 1,235
Referee: Craig Maxwell-Keys

23 March 2014
15:00

| (BP) Leeds Carnegie | 27 – 33 | Bristol (BP) |
| | Leeds; Bristol |

Headingley
Attendance: 3,297
Referee: Thomas Foley

=== Round 20 ===
29 March 2014
15:00

| Jersey | 8 – 39 | Moseley (BP) |
| | Jersey; Moseley |

St Peter
Attendance: 2,664
Referee: Steve Lee

29 March 2014
15:00

| (BP) Plymouth Albion | 20 – 26 | Cornish Pirates |
| | Plymouth; Pirates |

Brickfields
Attendance: 2,598
Referee: Darren Gamage

29 March 2014
17:00

| Bedford Blues | 12 – 33 | Rotherham |
| | Bedford; Rotherham |

Goldington Road
Attendance: 1,844
Referee: Thomas Foley

30 March 2014
14:00

| London Scottish | 21 – 32 | London Welsh |
| | Scottish; Welsh |

Richmond Athletic Ground
Attendance: 1,807
Referee: John Meredith

- This result means that London Welsh will finish in the top four and therefore are into the playoffs.

30 March 2014
15:00

| (BP) Bristol | 82 – 28 | Ealing Trailfinders (BP) |
| | Bristol; Ealing |

Memorial Stadium
Attendance: 4,852
Referee: David Procter

- This result means that Bristol will finish in the top four and therefore are into the playoffs.

30 March 2014
15:00

| (BP) Nottingham | 20 – 27 | Leeds Carnegie |
| | Nottingham; Leeds |

Meadow Lane
Attendance: 1,315
Referee: Martin Fox

=== Round 21 ===
12 April 2014
14:00

| (BP) London Welsh | 45 – 7 | Jersey |
| | Welsh; Jersey |

Kassam Stadium
Attendance: 1,082
Referee: Greg MacDonald

12 April 2014
15:00

| (BP) Ealing Trailfinders | 37 – 35 | Nottingham (2BP) |
| | Ealing; Nottingham |

Trailfinders Sports Ground
Attendance: 473
Referee: Dean Richards

12 April 2014
15:00

| Moseley | 24 – 33 | Bristol (BP) |
| | Moseley; Bristol |

Billesley Common
Attendance: 1,437
Referee: Thomas Foley

13 April 2014
14:00

| London Scottish | 19 – 15 | Bedford Blues (BP) |
| | Scottish; Bedford |

Richmond Athletic Ground
Attendance: 1,057
Referee: Martin Fox

13 April 2014
15:00

| Cornish Pirates | 20 – 40 | Rotherham (BP) |
| | Pirates; Rotherham |

The Mennaye
Attendance: 1,372
Referee: Andrew Jackson

13 April 2014
15:00

| (BP) Leeds Carnegie | 40 – 14 | Plymouth Albion |
| | Leeds; Plymouth |

Headingley
Attendance: 1,870
Referee: Ian Tempest

=== Round 22 ===
18 April 2014
19:45

| (BP) Bristol | 25 – 21 | London Welsh (BP) |
| | Bristol; Welsh |

Memorial Stadium
Attendance: 8,061
Referee: Luke Pearce

18 April 2014
20:00

| (BP) Nottingham | 29 – 24 | Moseley (2 BPs) |
| | Nottingham |

Meadow Lane
Attendance: 1,402
Referee: Ian Tempest

19 April 2014
14:00

| Jersey | 17 – 25 | London Scottish |
| | Jersey; Scottish |

St Peter
Attendance: 2,345
Referee: Darren Gamage

19 April 2014
15:00

| (BP) Bedford Blues | 48 – 36 | Cornish Pirates (BP) |
| | Bedford; Pirates |

Goldington Road
Attendance: 2,365
Referee: Thomas Foley

19 April 2014
15:00

| (BP) Plymouth Albion | 21 – 26 | Ealing Trailfinders (BP) |
| | Plymouth; Ealing |

Brickfields
Attendance: 1,555
Referee: Steve Lee

19 April 2014
15:00

| Rotherham | 17 – 34 | Leeds Carnegie |
| | Rotherham; Leeds |

Abbeydale Park, Sheffield
Attendance: 2,477
Referee: Martin Fox

=== Round 23 ===
25 April 2014
20:00

| (BP) Leeds Carnegie | 36 – 3 | Cornish Pirates |
| | Leeds; Pirates |

Headingley
Attendance: 2,017
Referee: Greg MacDonald

26 April 2014
15:00

| (BP) Bedford Blues | 31 – 41 | Jersey (BP) |
| | Bedford; Jersey |

Goldington Road
Attendance: 2,659
Referee: Andrew Small

26 April 2014
15:00

| (2 BPs) Ealing Trailfinders | 29 – 36 | Rotherham (BP) |
| | Ealing; Rotherham |

Trailfinders Sports Ground
Attendance: 842
Referee: Dean Richards

26 April 2014
15:00

| (BP) London Scottish | 31 – 55 | Bristol Rugby (BP) |
| | Scottish; Bristol |

Richmond Athletic Ground
Attendance: 2,155
Referee: Ian Tempest

26 April 2014
15:00

| (BP) London Welsh | 64 – 12 | Nottingham |
| | Welsh; Nottingham |

Old Deer Park
Attendance: 1,236
Referee: John Meredith

26 April 2014
15:00

| Moseley | 16 – 11 | Plymouth Albion (BP) |
| | Plymouth |

Billesley Common
Attendance: 1,105
Referee: Andrew Jackson

== Play–offs ==
=== Semi–finals ===
The semi–finals followed a 1 v 4, 2 v 3 system - with the games being played over two legs and the higher placed team deciding who played at home in the first leg.

==== First leg ====
10 May 2014
14:45

| Bristol Rugby | 17 – 14 | Rotherham |
| | Bristol; Rotherham |

Memorial Stadium
Attendance: 5,839
Referee: Tim Wigglesworth

11 May 2014
13:00

| Leeds Carnegie | 38 – 31 | London Welsh |
| | Leeds; Welsh |

Headingley
Attendance: 2,844
Referee: Andrew Small

==== Second leg ====
17 May 2014
18:05

| Rotherham | 11 – 22 | Bristol Rugby |
| | Rotherham; Bristol |

Abbeydale Sports Club (Sheffield RUFC)
Attendance: 3,267
Referee: Matthew Carley

- Bristol won 39 — 25 on aggregate

18 May 2014
12:45

| London Welsh | 29 – 20 | Leeds Carnegie |
| | Welsh; Leeds |

Kassam Stadium
Attendance: 2,324
Referee: Greg Garner

- London Welsh won 60 — 58 on aggregate

=== Final ===
28 May 2014
19:45

| London Welsh | 27 – 8 | Bristol Rugby |
| | Welsh; Bristol |

Kassam Stadium
Attendance: 5,021
Referee: Wayne Barnes

4 June 2014
19:45

| Bristol Rugby | 20 – 21 | London Welsh |
| | Bristol; Welsh |

Memorial Stadium
Attendance: 10,905
Referee: Luke Pearce

- London Welsh won 48–28 on aggregate and were promoted to Premiership Rugby

== Total attendances ==
- Note attendance statistics include 1st round with each team playing at the neutral venue considered the 'home team' as well as playoff games

| Club | Home Matches | Total | Average | Highest | Lowest | % Capacity |
|---|---|---|---|---|---|---|
| Bedford Blues | 12 | 27,137 | 2,261 | 2,754 | 1,550 | 45% |
| Bristol | 14 | 79,261 | 5,662 | 10,905 | 3,752 | 47% |
| Cornish Pirates | 12 | 21,558 | 1,797 | 3,752 | 1,127 | 40% |
| Ealing Trailfinders | 12 | 10,085 | 840 | 1,571 | 473 | 25% |
| Jersey | 12 | 27,184 | 2,265 | 3,752 | 1,592 | 42% |
| Leeds Carnegie | 13 | 30,028 | 2,310 | 3,902 | 1,098 | 13% |
| London Scottish | 12 | 15,269 | 1,272 | 2,155 | 797 | 27% |
| London Welsh | 14 | 24,121 | 1,723 | 5,021 | 999 | 16% |
| Moseley | 12 | 11,363 | 947 | 1,437 | 626 | 29% |
| Nottingham | 12 | 15,843 | 1,320 | 1,614 | 1,098 | 9% |
| Plymouth Albion | 12 | 22,999 | 1,917 | 3,752 | 1,036 | 22% |
| Rotherham Titans | 13 | 22,872 | 1,759 | 3,267 | 1,050 | 66% |

== Top scorers ==
=== Top points scorers ===
| Rank | Player | Team | Points |
|---|---|---|---|
| 1 | (Argentina) Juan Pablo Socino | Rotherham | 300 |
| 2 | (England) Matthew Jarvis | Nottingham | 191 |
| 3 | (Canada) James Pritchard | Bedford Blues | 175 |
| 4 | (England) Glyn Hughes | Leeds Carnegie | 156 |
| 5 | (England) Alex Lozowski | Leeds Carnegie | 143 |
| 6 | (Ireland) Declan Cusack | Plymouth Albion | 134 |
| 7 | (England) Alex Davies | London Welsh | 132 |
| 8 | (Ireland) Kieran Hallett | Cornish Pirates | 131 |
| 9 | (Republic of Ireland) Niall O'Connor | Jersey | 128 |
| 9 | (Scotland) Gordon Ross | London Welsh | 128 |

=== Top try scorers ===
| Rank | Player | Team | Tries |
|---|---|---|---|
| 1 | (England) Miles Mantella | London Scottish | 19 |
| 2 | (England) George Watkins | Bristol | 18 |
| 3 | (New Zealand) Mark Bright | London Scottish | 16 |
| 4 | (England) Tom Bowen | Plymouth Albion | 14 |
| 5 | (England) Phil Chesters | Ealing | 12 |
| 6 | (England) Seb Stegmann | London Welsh | 11 |
| 7 | (England) David Doherty | Leeds Carnegie | 10 |
| 7 | (England) Jonah Holmes | Leeds Carnegie | 10 |
| 7 | (Ireland) Michael Keating | Rotherham | 10 |
| 7 | (England) Nick Scott | London Welsh | 10 |
| 7 | (England) Matthew Williams | Moseley | 10 |

== Season records ==
=== Team ===
Largest home win — 70 pts

79 – 9 Rotherham Titans at home to Ealing Trailfinders on 21 September 2013

Largest away win — 44 pts

51 - 7 Rotherham Titans away to Nottingham on 9 March 2014

Most points scored — 82 pts

82 – 28 Bristol at home to Ealing Trailfinders on 30 March 2014

Most tries in a match — 12

Bristol at home to Ealing Trailfinders on 30 March 2014

Most conversions in a match — 11

Bristol at home to Ealing Trailfinders on 30 March 2014

Most penalties in a match — 8

Leeds Carnegie at home to London Welsh on 11 May 2014

Most drop goals in a match — 2

Ealing Trailfinders at home to Nottingham on 12 April 2014

=== Player ===
Most points in a match — 34

(Argentina) Juan Pablo Socino for Rotherham Titans at home to Ealing Trailfinders on 21 September 2013

Most tries in a match — 4 (x2)

(England) Marko Mama for Bristol at home to Cornish Pirates on 9 March 2014
(England) Curtis Wilson for Rotherham Titans away to Nottingham on 9 March 2014

Most conversions in a match — 11

(England) Adrian Jarvis for Bristol at home to Ealing Trailfinders on 30 March 2014

Most penalties in a match — 7

(England) Glyn Hughes for Leeds Carnegie at home to London Welsh on 11 May 2014

Most drop goals in a match — 1

N/A - multiple players

=== Attendances ===
Highest — 10,905

Bristol at home to London Welsh on 4 June 2014

Lowest — 473

Ealing Trailfinders at home to Nottingham on 12 April 2014

Highest Average Attendance — 5,662

Bristol

Lowest Average Attendance — 840

Ealing Trailfinders

== See also ==
- 2013–14 British and Irish Cup
