= 2012–13 Premiership Rugby =

Rugby union competition in England

2012–13 Aviva Premiership
- Countries: England
- Date: 1 September 2012 – 25 May 2013
- Champions: Leicester Tigers (10th title)
- Runners-up: Northampton Saints
- Relegated: London Welsh
- Matches played: 135
- Attendance: 1,684,804 (average 12,480 per match)
- Tries scored: 542 (average 4 per match)
- Top point scorer: Nick Evans (Harlequins) (258 points)
- Top try scorer: Tom Varndell (Wasps), Christian Wade (Wasps) (13 tries)

Official website
- www.premiershiprugby.com

The 2012–13 Aviva Premiership was the 26th season of the top-flight English domestic rugby union competition and the third one to be sponsored by Aviva. The reigning champions entering the season were Harlequins, who had claimed their first title after defeating Leicester Tigers in the 2012 final. London Welsh had been promoted as champions from the 2011–12 RFU Championship, their first promotion to the top flight.

== Summary ==
Leicester Tigers won their tenth title after defeating Northampton Saints in the final at Twickenham, having finished second in the regular season table. London Welsh were relegated, in part, for having received a 5-point deduction for fielding a player who did not hold an Effective Registration. It was the first time that London Welsh had been relegated from the top flight since they first achieved promotion.

As usual, round 1 included the London Double Header at Twickenham, the ninth instance since its inception in 2004.

== Rule changes ==
For the second consecutive season, significant changes were made to the Premiership's salary cap. Last season, "academy credits" were introduced, giving each team a £30,000 cap credit for each of up to eight home-grown players in the senior squad. This season, the team cap rose for the first time since the 2008–09 season when it was increased from £2.2 million to £4 million. The new cap is £4.26 million before academy credits and up to £4.5 million with credits. In addition, each team was allowed to sign one player whose salary did not count against the cap.

== Teams ==
Twelve teams compete in the league – the top eleven teams from the previous season and London Welsh, who were promoted from the 2011–12 RFU Championship to the top flight for the first time. They replaced Newcastle Falcons, who were relegated after fifteen years in the top flight.

=== Stadiums and locations ===
2012–13 Aviva Premiership Teams
2012-13 Aviva Premiership teams in Greater London

Club	Director of Rugby/Head Coach	Captain	Kit Supplier	Stadium	Capacity	City/Area
Bath	(South Africa) Gary Gold	(England) Stuart Hooper	Puma	The Recreation Ground	12,300	Bath
Exeter Chiefs	(England) Rob Baxter	(Ireland) Tommy Hayes	Samurai Sportswear	Sandy Park	10,744	Exeter
Gloucester	(Wales) Nigel Davies	(Scotland) Jim Hamilton	KooGa	Kingsholm	16,500	Gloucester
Harlequins	(Ireland) Conor O'Shea	(England) Chris Robshaw	O'Neills	Twickenham Stoop (Note: Harlequins will also play a home game at Twickenham Stadium on 29 December 2012)	14,816	Twickenham, Greater London
Leicester Tigers	(England) Richard Cockerill	(Ireland) Geordan Murphy	Canterbury	Welford Road	24,000	Leicester
London Irish	(Australia) Brian Smith	(England) Declan Danaher	ISC	Madejski Stadium (Note: London Irish will also play a home game at Twickenham Stadium on 6 September 2014)	24,250	Reading
London Wasps	(Wales) Dai Young	(Scotland) Hugo Southwell	Kukri Sports	Adams Park (Note: London Wasps will also play a home game at Twickenham Stadium on 1 September 2012)	10,516	High Wycombe
London Welsh	(Wales) Lyn Jones	(Wales) Jonathan Mills	Samurai Sportswear	Kassam Stadium	12,500	Oxford
Northampton Saints	(England) Jim Mallinder	(England) Dylan Hartley	BURRDA	Franklin's Gardens	13,591	Northampton
Sale Sharks	(Scotland) Bryan Redpath	(England) David Seymour	Canterbury	AJ Bell Stadium	12,000	Salford, Greater Manchester
Saracens	(Ireland) Mark McCall	(England) Steve Borthwick	Nike	Allianz Park (Note: Allianz Park was not ready until February 2013. Until that time, Saracens played their home fixtures in a variety of stadia including one game at Twickenham Stadium, one game at Wembley Stadium, one game at Stadium mk and three games at Vicarage Road)	10,000 (Note: Allianz Park typically has a capacity of 10,000 but this can be raised to 15,000 with temporary seating)	Hendon, Greater London
Worcester Warriors	(England) Richard Hill	(England) Dean Schofield	Cotton Traders	Sixways Stadium	12,068	Worcester

== Pre-season ==
Following a lengthy appeal, London Welsh successfully gained promotion to the Premiership, having contested the Professional Game Boards recommendation to refuse them entry based on the Minimum Standards Criteria. This meant that Newcastle Falcons were relegated, following their confirmation that they would not appeal the new decision.

The 2012 edition of the Premiership Rugby Sevens Series began on 13 July 2012 at The Stoop, continued on 20 July at Edgeley Park, and 26 July at Kingsholm. This was the first opportunity of the season for any of the teams competing in the Premiership to win a trophy. The finals were held on 3 August 2012 at The Recreation Ground, and the Series was won by London Irish.

== Table ==
2012–13 Premiership Rugby Table
Pos	Team	Pld	W	D	L	PF	PA	PD	TF	TA	TB	LB	Pts	Qualification or relegation
1	Saracens (SF)	22	17	1	4	533	339	+194	41	25	5	2	77	Play-off place, Berth in the 2013–14 Heineken Cup
2	Leicester Tigers (C)	22	15	1	6	538	345	+193	56	29	7	5	74	Play-off place, Berth in the 2013–14 Heineken Cup
3	Harlequins (SF)	22	15	0	7	560	453	+107	52	35	5	4	69	Play-off place, Berth in the 2013–14 Heineken Cup
4	Northampton Saints (RU)	22	14	0	8	501	433	+68	55	36	6	3	65	Play-off place, Berth in the 2013–14 Heineken Cup
5	Gloucester	22	12	1	9	515	481	+34	40	42	2	8	60	Berth in the 2013–14 Heineken Cup
6	Exeter Chiefs	22	12	1	9	542	446	+96	51	43	4	5	59	Berth in the 2013–14 Heineken Cup
7	Bath	22	10	1	11	452	434	+18	44	29	4	7	53	2013–14 European Challenge Cup
8	London Wasps	22	9	0	13	511	528	−17	47	51	4	8	48	2013–14 European Challenge Cup
9	London Irish	22	7	1	14	459	601	−142	38	57	2	3	35	2013–14 European Challenge Cup
10	Sale Sharks	22	7	1	14	377	596	−219	37	53	2	3	35	2013–14 European Challenge Cup
11	Worcester Warriors	22	5	1	16	422	547	−125	35	59	3	8	33	2013–14 European Challenge Cup
12	London Welsh (Note: The champion of the Championship (Newcastle Falcons) are eligible for promotion.) (R)	22	5	0	17	412	619	−207	30	67	1	7	23 (Note: London Welsh were deducted 5 competition points for fielding a player who did not hold an Effective Registration.)	Relegated

Source: Premiership Rugby
Rules for classification: Tiebreakers for teams tied on points: 1) Number of matches won; 2) Difference between points for and against; 3) Total number of points for; 4) Aggregate number of points scored in matches between tied teams; 5) Number of matches won excluding the first match, then the second and so on until the tie is settled
(C) Champions; (RU) Runners-up; (SF) Losing semi-finalists; (R) Relegated

== Regular season ==
Premiership Rugby announced the fixture list on 4 July 2012. As with previous seasons, Round 1 included the London Double Header at Twickenham.

Fixtures as per Premiership Rugby Match Centre.

=== Round 1 ===
1 September 2012
14:00

London Wasps	40–42	Harlequins
	Report

Twickenham
Attendance: 63,102

1 September 2012
15:00

Exeter Chiefs	43–6	Sale Sharks
	Report

Sandy Park
Attendance: 5,568

1 September 2012
15:00

Gloucester	19–24	Northampton Saints
	Report

Kingsholm
Attendance: 11,817

1 September 2012
15:00

Worcester Warriors	23–24	Bath
	Report

Sixways
Attendance: 7,847

1 September 2012
16:30

Saracens	40–3	London Irish
	Report

Twickenham
Attendance: 63,102

2 September 2012
14:00

London Welsh	13–38	Leicester Tigers
	Report

Kassam Stadium
Attendance: 6,850

=== Round 2 ===
7 September 2012
19:45

Harlequins	40–3	London Welsh
	Report

Twickenham Stoop
Attendance: 12,550

8 September 2012
14:15

Bath	30–23	London Wasps
	Report

The Rec
Attendance: 10,438

8 September 2012
15:00

Leicester Tigers	34–26	Worcester Warriors
	Report

Welford Road
Attendance: 19,250

8 September 2012
15:00

London Irish	31–40	Gloucester
	Report

Madejski Stadium
Attendance: 5,828

8 September 2012
16:30

Sale Sharks	16–23	Saracens
	Report

Salford City Stadium
Attendance: 7,451

9 September 2012
15:00

Northampton Saints	24–21	Exeter Chiefs
	Report

Franklin's Gardens
Attendance: 12,230

=== Round 3 ===
14 September 2012
19:45

Bath	14–18	Northampton Saints
	Report

The Rec
Attendance: 10,462

15 September 2012
13:30

Worcester Warriors	16–16	Gloucester
	Report

Sixways
Attendance: 8,717

15 September 2012
15:00

Harlequins	37–14	Sale Sharks
	Report

Twickenham Stoop
Attendance: 13,432

15 September 2012
15:00

London Wasps	43–14	London Irish
	Report

Adams Park
Attendance: 5,612

15 September 2012
15:30

Saracens	9–9	Leicester Tigers
	Report

Wembley Stadium
Attendance: 41,063

16 September 2012
15:00

London Welsh	25–24	Exeter Chiefs
	Report

Kassam Stadium
Attendance: 3,150

=== Round 4 ===
21 September 2012
20:00

Sale Sharks	19–29	London Welsh
	Report

Salford City Stadium
Attendance: 7,479

22 September 2012
15:00

London Irish	29–22	Bath
	Report

Madejski Stadium
Attendance: 7,324

22 September 2012
15:00

Northampton Saints	37–31	Worcester Warriors
	Report

Franklin's Gardens
Attendance: 12,114

22 September 2012
15:15

Gloucester	29–22	London Wasps
	Report

Kingsholm
Attendance: 10,782

22 September 2012
17:30

Leicester Tigers	9–22	Harlequins
	Report

Welford Road
Attendance: 20,354

23 September 2012
14:15

Exeter Chiefs	14–12	Saracens
	Report

Sandy Park
Attendance: 6,141

=== Round 5 ===
28 September 2012
19:45

Northampton Saints	24–6	London Wasps
	Report

Franklin's Gardens
Attendance: 12,955

28 September 2012
20:00

Worcester Warriors	35–11	London Irish
	Report

Sixways
Attendance: 8,418

29 September 2012
14:15

Bath	31–10	Sale Sharks
	Report

The Rec
Attendance: 11,073

29 September 2012
14:15

Leicester Tigers	30–8	Exeter Chiefs
	Report

Welford Road
Attendance: 19,292

30 September 2012
14:00

Harlequins	16–18	Saracens
	Report

Twickenham Stoop
Attendance: 14,224

30 September 2012
15:00

London Welsh	25–31	Gloucester
	Report

Kassam Stadium
Attendance: 4,548

=== Round 6 ===
5 October 2012
20:00

Sale Sharks	8–20	Leicester Tigers
	Report

Salford City Stadium
Attendance: 8,212

6 October 2012
14:15

Gloucester	16–10	Bath
	Report

Kingsholm
Attendance: 15,677

6 October 2012
15:00

Exeter Chiefs	42–28	Harlequins
	Report

Sandy Park
Attendance: 8,472

6 October 2012
15:00

London Irish	39–17	Northampton Saints
	Report

Madejski Stadium
Attendance: 7,918

7 October 2012
14:15

London Welsh	23–28	Saracens
	Report

Kassam Stadium
Attendance: 4,685

7 October 2012
15:00

London Wasps	10–6	Worcester Warriors
	Report

Adams Park
Attendance: 5,232

=== Round 7 ===
26 October 2012
20:00

Worcester Warriors	23–16	Sale Sharks
	Report

Sixways
Attendance: 8,669

27 October 2012
14:30

Bath	23–15	Exeter Chiefs
	Report

The Rec
Attendance: 12,200

27 October 2012
15:00

Northampton Saints	6–16	Saracens
	Report

Franklin's Gardens
Attendance: 13,475

27 October 2012
16:45

Gloucester	27–21	Leicester Tigers
	Report

Kingsholm
Attendance: 15,110

28 October 2012
14:15

London Irish	28–31	Harlequins
	Report

Madejski Stadium
Attendance: 10,247

28 October 2012
15:00

London Wasps	29–19	London Welsh
	Report

Adams Park
Attendance: 5,964

=== Round 8 ===
2 November 2012
20:00

Sale Sharks	21–9	London Irish
	Report

Salford City Stadium
Attendance: 5,723

3 November 2012
14:15

Leicester Tigers	16–12	Northampton Saints
	Report

Welford Road
Attendance: 24,000

3 November 2012
15:00

Exeter Chiefs	33–9	Worcester Warriors
	Report

Sandy Park
Attendance: 7,295

3 November 2012
17:15

Harlequins	28–25	Gloucester
	Report

Twickenham Stoop
Attendance: 14,517

4 November 2012
14:15

Saracens	29–24	London Wasps
	Report

Vicarage Road
Attendance: 6,466

4 November 2012
15:00

London Welsh	16–9	Bath
	Report

Kassam Stadium
Attendance: 5,004

=== Round 9 ===
23 November 2012
19:45

Bath	21–18	Harlequins
	Report

The Rec
Attendance: 11,666

23 November 2012
20:00

Worcester Warriors	12–3	Saracens
	Report

Sixways
Attendance: 8,848

24 November 2012
12:00

Gloucester	29–3	Sale Sharks
	Report

Kingsholm
Attendance: 12,501

24 November 2012
13:00

Northampton Saints	23–16	London Welsh
	Report

Franklin's Gardens
Attendance: 11,695

25 November 2012
14:30

London Wasps	14–12	Leicester Tigers
	Report

Adams Park
Attendance: 7,658

25 November 2012
15:00

London Irish	23–27	Exeter Chiefs
	Report

Madejski Stadium
Attendance: 7,270

=== Round 10 ===
30 November 2012
19.45

Harlequins	22–19	Worcester Warriors
	Report

Twickenham Stoop
Attendance: 11,630

30 November 2012
20:00

Sale Sharks	16–27	Northampton Saints
	Report

Salford City Stadium
Attendance: 5,307

1 December 2012
12:30

Leicester Tigers	17–12	Bath
	Report

Welford Road
Attendance: 20,170

1 December 2012
13:00

London Welsh	15–9	London Irish
	Report

Kassam Stadium
Attendance: 3,750

1 December 2012
17:30

Exeter Chiefs	30–23	London Wasps
	Report

Sandy Park
Attendance: 7,557

2 December 2012
15:00

Saracens	28–23	Gloucester
	Report

Vicarage Road
Attendance: 5,960

=== Round 11 ===
21 December 2012
20:00

Worcester Warriors	13–6	London Welsh
	Report

Sixways
Attendance: 8,991

22 December 2012
14:15

Bath	0–22	Saracens
	Report

The Rec
Attendance: 12,200

22 December 2012
15:00

Gloucester	18–16	Exeter Chiefs
	Report

Kingsholm
Attendance: 16,121

22 December 2012
15:00

London Irish	9–31	Leicester Tigers
	Report

Madejski Stadium
Attendance: 10,958

22 December 2012
15:00

Northampton Saints	9–18	Harlequins
	Report

Franklin’s Gardens
Attendance: 13,475

23 December 2012
15:00

London Wasps	25–18	Sale Sharks
	Report

Adams Park
Attendance: 6,486

=== Round 12 ===
28 December 2012
20:00

Sale Sharks	33–27	Worcester Warriors
	Report

Salford City Stadium
Attendance: 6,347

29 December 2012
14:15

Harlequins	26–15	London Irish
	Report

Twickenham
Attendance: 82,000

29 December 2012
15:00

Exeter Chiefs	12–12	Bath
	Report

Sandy Park
Attendance: 10,744

29 December 2012
15:00

London Welsh	15–34	London Wasps
	Report

Kassam Stadium
Attendance: 10,045

29 December 2012
17:00

Leicester Tigers	17–12	Gloucester
	Report

Welford Road
Attendance: 24,000

30 December 2012
14:15

Saracens	17–16	Northampton Saints
	Report

Stadium mk, Milton Keynes
Attendance: 18,856

=== Round 13 ===
4 January 2013
20:00

Worcester Warriors	14–19	Leicester Tigers
Try: Lemi 14' m Pen: Goode (3/4) 5', 21', 23'	Report	Try: Hamilton 39' m Penalty Try (2) 55' c, 79' c Con: Flood (2/3) 55', 79'

Sixways Stadium
Attendance: 12,024
Referee: JP Doyle

5 January 2013
15:00

Exeter Chiefs	19–30	Northampton Saints
Try: Naqelevuki 66' c Con: Mieres (1/1) 66'; Pen: Steenson (4/4) 14', 39', 43',48'	Report	Try: Pisi 18' c Tongaʻuiha 58' c van Velze 74' c Con: Myler (3/3) 18', 58', 74'; Pen: Myler (3/4) 28', 36', 46'

Sandy Park
Attendance: 8,357
Referee: Greg Garner

5 January 2013
15:00

Gloucester	12–18	London Irish
Pen: Burns (4/6) 1', 36', 57', 61'	Report	Try: Skivington (2) 22' m, 37' c Con: Shingler (1/2) 37'; Pen: Shingler (1/3) 11'; Homer (1/1) 71'

Kingsholm
Attendance: 13,171
Referee: David Rose

6 January 2013
15:00

London Wasps	29–15	Bath
Try: Wade 22' c Bell 72' c Con: Jones 40'; Robinson 72'; Pen: Jones 3', 21', 24', 54', 61'	Report	Try: Abendanon 1' m Claassens 14' c Con: Donald 15'; Pen: Heathcote 42'

Adams Park
Attendance: 7,046
Referee: Andrew Small

6 January 2013
15:00

London Welsh	26–31	Harlequins
Try: Scott 63' c Jackson 72' c Con: Ross (2) 64', 72'; Pen: Ross 30', 40', 55', 58'	Report	Try: Care 15' c Lowe 20' c Robshaw 38' c Evans 66' c Con: Evans (4) 16', 21' 39', 66'; Pen: Evans 61'

Kassam Stadium
Attendance: 4,653
Referee: Llyr Apgeraint-Roberts

6 January 2013
15:00

Saracens	32–12	Sale Sharks
Try: Strettle 63' c Hodgson 70' c Con: Farrell (2) 64', 70'; Pen: Farrell 13', 17', 20', 23', 28', 53'	Report	Pen: Cipriani 4', 8', 50' 61'

Vicarage Road
Attendance: 5,472
Referee: Tim Wigglesworth

=== Round 14 ===
8 February 2013
20:00

Sale Sharks	21–16	Exeter Chiefs
Try: Braid 17' m Cueto 55' c Con: Miller (1/2); Pen: Miller (1/1) 59'; Cipriani (1/1) 65'; Drop: Macleod (1/1) 77'	Report	Try: Votu 37' c Con: Steenson (1/1); Pen: Steenson (3/3) 15', 22', 44'

Salford City Stadium
Attendance: 8,232
Referee: Greg Garner

9 February 2013
12:30

Northampton Saints	11–27	Gloucester
Try: Dowson 54' m Con: Myler (0/1); Pen: Myler (2/3) 5', 27'	Report	Try: May (2) 19' m, 42' c Con: Cook (1/2); Pen: Cook (5/5) 8', 12', 32', 34', 73'

Franklin’s Gardens
Attendance: 12,742
Referee: Martin Fox

9 February 2013
14:15

Bath	32–9	Worcester Warriors
Try: Stringer 6' m Webber 23' m Biggs 53' m Agulla (2) 62' c, 77' c Con: Donald (0/3); Heathcote (2/2); Pen: Donald (1/1) 39'	Report	Pen: Gray (3/3) 13', 26', 37'

The Rec
Attendance: 10,989
Referee: Wayne Barnes

9 February 2013
15:00

Leicester Tigers	28–12	London Welsh
Try: Thompstone 25' c Morris 58' c Bowden 79' m Con: Ford (2/2); Bowden (0/1); Pen: Ford (3/4) 5', 12', 37',	Report	Pen: Ross (4/5) 3', 49', 51', 57'; Arscott (0/1)

Welford Road
Attendance: 20,065
Referee: Tim Wigglesworth

9 February 2013
15:00

London Irish	29–16	Saracens
Try: Geraghty 53' c Treviranus 70' c Con: Homer (2/2); Pen: Homer (5/7) 5', 15', 35', 43', 61'	Report	Try: Strettle 66' c Con: Hodgson (1/1); Pen: Hodgson (3/4) 2', 8', 38'

Madejski Stadium
Attendance: 9,245
Referee: Andrew Small

9 February 2013
20:00

Harlequins	16–17	London Wasps
Try: Hopper 22' c Con: Evans (1/1); Pen: Evans (3/6) 18', 40', 71'	Report	Try: Varndell 8' c Wade 13' c Con: Robinson (2/2); Pen: Robinson (1/2) 60'; Daly (0/2)

Twickenham Stoop
Attendance: 12,552
Referee: JP Doyle

=== Round 15 ===
16 February 2013
14:15

Bath	40–16	London Irish
	Report

The Rec
Attendance: 11,879
Referee: David Rose

16 February 2013
15:00

Saracens	31–11	Exeter Chiefs
	Report

Allianz Park
Attendance: 9,997
Referee: Martin Fox

16 February 2013
15:00

Worcester Warriors	18–27	Northampton Saints
	Report

Sixways
Attendance: 9,013
Referee: Greg Garner

16 February 2013
17:15

Harlequins	25–21	Leicester Tigers
	Report

Twickenham Stoop
Attendance: 14,800
Referee: Wayne Barnes

17 February 2013
13:00

London Wasps	33–29	Gloucester
	Report

Adams Park
Attendance: 6,076
Referee: Andrew Small

17 February 2013
15:00

London Welsh	25–26	Sale Sharks
	Report

Kassam Stadium
Attendance: 4,074
Referee: JP Doyle

=== Round 16 ===
22 February 2013
19:45

Gloucester	29–23	Worcester Warriors
	Report

Kingsholm
Attendance: 14,362
Referee: David Rose

22 February 2013
20:00

Sale Sharks	21–30	Harlequins
	Report

Salford City Stadium
Attendance: 7,103
Referee: Martin Fox

23 February 2013
15:00

Exeter Chiefs	47–16	London Welsh
	Report

Sandy Park
Attendance: 7,317
Referee: Andrew Small

23 February 2013
15:00

Northampton Saints	25–23	Bath
	Report

Franklin’s Gardens
Attendance: 12,291
Referee: Luke Pearce

23 February 2013
20:00

Leicester Tigers	27–32	Saracens
	Report

Welford Road
Attendance: 20,728
Referee: JP Doyle

24 February 2013
15:00

London Irish	30–19	London Wasps
	Report

Madejski Stadium
Attendance: 7,184
Referee: Tim Wigglesworth

=== Round 17 ===
1 March 2013
20:00

Bath	31–25	Gloucester
	Report

The Rec
Attendance: 11,953
Referee: Tim Wigglesworth

1 March 2013
20:00

Worcester Warriors	29–23	London Wasps
	Report

Sixways
Attendance: 9,214
Referee: Greg Garner

2 March 2013
15:00

Leicester Tigers	48–10	Sale Sharks
	Report

Welford Road
Attendance: 20,585
Referee: Wayne Barnes

2 March 2013
15:00

Northampton Saints	40–14	London Irish
	Report

Franklin’s Gardens
Attendance: 12,465
Referee: JP Doyle

2 March 2013
15:15

Harlequins	16–27	Exeter Chiefs
	Report

Twickenham Stoop
Attendance: 14,800
Referee: David Rose

3 March 2013
14:15

Saracens	35–14	London Welsh
	Report

Allianz Park
Attendance: 9,968
Referee: Luke Pearce

=== Round 18 ===
22 March 2013
20:00

Sale Sharks	14–13	Bath
	Report

Salford City Stadium
Attendance: 6,541
Referee: JP Doyle

23 March 2013
15:00

Gloucester	15–14	London Welsh
	Report

Kingsholm
Attendance: 14,627
Referee: Martin Fox

23 March 2013
15:00

London Irish	26–6	Worcester Warriors
	Report

Madejski Stadium
Attendance: 19,523
Referee: Wayne Barnes

23 March 2013
15:15

London Wasps	24–26	Northampton Saints
	Report

Adams Park
Attendance: 7,193
Referee: David Rose

23 March 2013
17:00

Exeter Chiefs	9–12	Leicester Tigers
	Report

Sandy Park
Attendance: 10,427
Referee: Tim Wigglesworth

24 March 2013
14:00

Saracens	27–12	Harlequins
	Report

Allianz Park
Attendance: 9,996
Referee: Greg Garner

=== Round 19 ===
29 March 2013
19:45

Gloucester	17–15	Harlequins
Try: May 44' c Qera 70' c Con: Burns (2/2); Pen: Burns (1/2) 20'	Report	Try: Buchanan 8' m Smith 23' c Con: Evans (1/2); Pen: Evans (1/1) 55'; Cards: Joe Gray (yellow card) 68' to 78'

Kingsholm
Attendance: 14,699
Referee: JP Doyle

30 March 2013
14.15

Bath	40–25	London Welsh
Try: Banahan 1' m Fearns 8' m Rokoduguni 40' c Agulla 64' c Claassens 78' c Con: Donald (1/3); Heathcote (2/2); Pen: Donald (2/2) 21', 63'; Heathcote (1/1) 75'	Report	Try: Jewell 69' c Con: Davies (1/1); Pen: Davies (6/7) 23', 27', 30', 43', 48', 55'

The Rec
Attendance: 11,621
Referee: Tim Wigglesworth

30 March 2013
15:00

London Wasps	13–22	Saracens
Try: Wade 9' c Con: Jones (1/1); Pen: Daly (2/2) 7', 12'; Cards: Sakaria Taulafo (yellow card) 69' to 79'	Report	Try: Wyles 16' m Ashton 68' m Con: Farrell (0/2); Pen: Farrell (4/5) 26', 62', 70', 78'; Cards: Mouritz Botha (yellow card) 40' to 50'

Adams Park
Attendance: 8,078
Referee: Martin Fox

30 March 2013
15:00

Northampton Saints	8–36	Leicester Tigers
Try: Myler 57' m Con: Myler (0/1); Pen: Myler (1/1) 12'; Cards: Courtney Lawes (yellow card) 36' to 46'	Report	Try: Tuilagi (2) 41' m, 61' c Morris 70' c Tait 74' m Con: Flood (2/3); Ford (0/1); Pen: Flood (4/4) 9', 18', 28', 37'; Cards: Niall Morris (yellow card) 53' to 63'

Franklin’s Gardens
Attendance: 13,479
Referee: Wayne Barnes

30 March 2013
15:00

Worcester Warriors	18–24	Exeter Chiefs
Try: Kvesic 46' m Drauniniu 59' c Con: Goode (1/2); Pen: Goode (2/3) 2', 12'; Cards: Josh Matavesi (yellow card) 69' to 79'	Report	Try: Arscott 5' c Steenson 20' c Mumm 76' c Con: Steenson (3/3); Pen: Steenson (1/2) 46'

Sixways
Attendance: 9,130
Referee: David Rose

31 March 2013
14:15

London Irish	33–33	Sale Sharks
Try: Armitage 2' c Aulika 9' c Lahiff 53' c Con: Homer (3/3); Pen: Homer (4/5) 31', 33', 55', 65'	Report	Try: Thomas 19' c Cueto 26' m Myall 40' c Gaskell 45' m Con: Macleod (2/4); Pen: Macleod (3/3) 6', 43', 79'

Madejski Stadium
Attendance: 6,968
Referee: Greg Garner

=== Round 20 ===
12 April 2013
19:45

Sale Sharks	32–9	Gloucester
Try: Leota 1' m Peel (2) 6' c, 74' m Shephard 39' c Cueto 80' m Con: Macleod (2/3); Cipriani (0/2); Pen: Macleod (1/1) 30'	Report	Pen: Burns (3/5) 5', 15', 54'

Salford City Stadium
Attendance: 8,023
Referee: David Rose

13 April 2013
14:15

Harlequins	23–9	Bath
Try: Care 45' c Monye 63' c Con: Botica (2/2); Pen: Botica (2/2) 31', 56'; Evans (1/1) 34'	Report	Pen: Donald (2/2) 5', 40'; Devoto (1/1) 22'

The Twickenham Stoop
Attendance: 14,326
Referee: Wayne Barnes

13 April 2013
15:00

Exeter Chiefs	27–6	London Irish
Try: Jess 61' m Ewers 77' c Con: Steenson (0/1); Slade (1/1); Pen: Steenson (5/6) 14', 30', 33', 37' 53'	Report	Pen: Homer (1/1) 21'; Humphreys (1/1) 58'

Sandy Park
Attendance: 8,986
Referee: Martin Fox

14 April 2013
15:00

London Welsh	14–31	Northampton Saints
Try: Scott 30' c Browne 70' c Con: Davies (1/1); Ross (1/1)	Report	Try: May (2) 36' m, 39' m Burrell (2) 44' m, 78' c Con: Myler (0/3); Lamb (1/1); Pen: Myler (3/3) 2', 5', 34'

Kassam Stadium
Attendance: 5,621
Referee: Greg Garner

14 April 2013
15:00

Saracens	47–17	Worcester Warriors
Try: Strettle (3) 9' m, 19' c, 23' m Nieto 54' c Ashton 74' c Wray 79' c Con: Hodgson (4/6); Pen: Hodgson (3/4) 5', 15', 69'	Report	Try: Drauininu 27' c Kvesic 48' c Con: Gray (2/2); Pen: Gray (1/1) 3'

Allianz Park
Attendance: 9,995
Referee: Tim Wigglesworth

14 April 2013
15:45

Leicester Tigers	35–16	London Wasps
Try: Youngs (2) 22' m, 44' c Kitchener 26' m Hawkins 36' m Thompstone 59' c Con: Flood (2/5); Pen: Flood (2/3) 14', 19'	Report	Try: Daly 63' c Con: Bell (1/1); Pen: Bell (2/2) 30', 40'; Daly (1/1) 53'

Welford Road
Attendance: 24,000
Referee: JP Doyle

=== Round 21 ===
20 April 2013
14:15

Bath	27–26	Leicester Tigers
Try: Taylor 8' c Rokoduguni 17' m Agulla 38' c Louw 73' m Con: Devoto (1/2); Donald (1/1); Heathcote (0/1); Pen: Donald (0/2); Heathcote (1/2)	Report	Try: Croft 13' c Youngs 25' c Con: Flood (2/2); Pen: Flood (4/4) 5', 20', 48', 53'

The Rec
Attendance: 12,200
Referee: Tim Wigglesworth

20 April 2013
15:00

Gloucester	28–23	Saracens
Try: May (2) 8' m, 30' c Morgan 61' c Con: Burns (2/3); Pen: Burns (3/4) 4', 37', 80'	Report	Try: Tomkins (2) 20' c, 69' c Con: Farrell (2/2); Pen: Farrell (3/3) 11', 27', 60'

Kingsholm
Attendance: 15,537
Referee: JP Doyle

20 April 2013
15:00

London Irish	47–28	London Welsh
Try: Armitage (2) 8' c, 68' c Aulika (2) 36' c, 42' c Hala'ufia 38' m Tagicakibau 61' c Garvey 66' c Con: Humphreys (6/7)	Report	Try: Stegmann 19' m Scott 31' c Bateman 74' c Con: Ross (2/3); Pen: Ross (3/5) 7', 46', 49'

Madejski Stadium
Attendance: 11,716
Referee: Dean Richards

20 April 2013
15:00

Worcester Warriors	26–42	Harlequins
Try: Pennell 14' c Grove 41' c Con: Goode (2/2); Pen: Goode (4/4) 21', 23', 40', 46',	Report	Try: Evans (2) 18' c, 65' c Williams 31' m Care (2) 37' m, 50' m Brown 71' c Con: Evans (3/6); Pen: Evans (2/2) 15', 55'

Sixways
Attendance: 11,579
Referee: Martin Fox

20 April 2013
17:45

Northampton Saints	47–7	Sale Sharks
Try: Wood 22' c Dickson 30' c Burrell 34' m Elliott (2) 56' m, 65' m Wilson (2) 70' c, 79' m Con: Myler (2/3); Lamb (1/3); Pen: Myler (2/2) 12', 16'	Report	Try: Gaskell 80' c Con: Cipriani (1/1)

Franklin’s Gardens
Attendance: 13,493
Referee: Luke Pearce

21 April 2013
14:00

London Wasps	24–37	Exeter Chiefs
Try: Wade 29' c Southwell 49' c Varndell 79' c Con: Jones (2/2); Bell (1/1); Pen: Jones (0/1); Daly (1/1) 6'	Report	Try: Yeandle 12' c Nowell 19' c Welch 41' c Thomas 56' c Con: Steenson (4/4); Pen: Steenson (3/5) 10', 24', 66'

Adams Park
Attendance: 7,197
Referee: Wayne Barnes

=== Round 22 ===
All games in Round 22 kicked off at 15.00 on 4 May 2013, so as to not give any team a potential advantage with regards to knowing how to achieve a play-off berth, Heineken Cup place, or safety from relegation.

4 May 2013
15:00

Exeter Chiefs	40–39	Gloucester
	Report

Sandy Park
Attendance: 10,744
Referee: Greg Garner

4 May 2013
15:00

Harlequins	22–19	Northampton Saints
	Report

Twickenham Stoop
Attendance: 14,800
Referee: Tim Wigglesworth

4 May 2013
15:00

Leicester Tigers	32–20	London Irish
	Report

Welford Road
Attendance: 24,000
Referee: Luke Pearce

4 May 2013
15:00

London Welsh	33–22	Worcester Warriors
	Report

Kassam Stadium
Attendance: 3,610
Referee: Matt Carley

4 May 2013
15:00

Sale Sharks	21–20	London Wasps
	Report

Salford City Stadium
Attendance: 9,783
Referee: Dean Richards

4 May 2013
15:00

Saracens	23–14	Bath
	Report

Allianz Park
Attendance: 9,998
Referee: Martin Fox

== Play-offs ==
As in previous seasons, the top four teams in the Premiership table, following the conclusion of the regular season, contest the play-off semi-finals in a 1st vs 4th and 2nd vs 3rd format, with the higher ranking team having home advantage. The two winners of the semi-finals then meet in the Premiership Final at Twickenham on 25 May 2013.

=== Bracket ===
Semi-finals
2	Leicester Tigers	33
3	Harlequins	16
1	Saracens	13
4	Northampton Saints	27

Final
1	Leicester Tigers	37
3	Northampton Saints	17

=== Semi-finals ===
11 May 2013
15:00

Leicester Tigers	33–16	Harlequins
	Report

Welford Road
Attendance: 20,243
Referee: Greg Garner

12 May 2013
15:00

Saracens	13–27	Northampton Saints
	Report

Allianz Park
Attendance: 9,998
Referee: JP Doyle

=== Final ===
The final was contested at Twickenham on 25 May 2013 between Leicester Tigers and Northampton Saints with Leicester winning 37–17. Northampton captain Dylan Hartley was sent off for using foul and abusive language just before half-time after calling referee Wayne Barnes a "fucking cheat". This was the first time a player has ever been red carded in a Premiership Final, as was said by the commentators during the match.

25 May 2013
15:00

Leicester Tigers	37–17	Northampton Saints
Try: Morris 8' c, Kitchener 48', Tuilagi 66', Goneva 74'; Con: Flood (1/1) Ford (0/3); Pen: Flood 5' Ford 40+2', 56', 81'	Report	Try: Myler 15', Foden 44', Dickson 57' c Con: Myler (1/3); Red Card: Hartley 40+1'

Twickenham
Attendance: 81,703
Referee: Wayne Barnes

Team details

Leicester Tigers
Northampton Saints

FB	15	(England) Mathew Tait
RW	14	(Ireland) Niall Morris
OC	13	(England) Manu Tuilagi
IC	12	(England) Anthony Allen
LW	11	(Fiji) Vereniki Goneva (substituted off) 75'
FH	10	(England) Toby Flood (c) (substituted off) 24'
SH	9	(England) Ben Youngs (substituted off) 75'
N8	8	(England) Jordan Crane (substituted off) 73'
OF	7	(Australia) Julian Salvi
BF	6	(England) Tom Croft
RL	5	(England) Geoff Parling
LL	4	(England) Graham Kitchener (substituted off) 56'
TP	3	(England) Dan Cole (substituted off) 68'
HK	2	(England) Tom Youngs (substituted off) 68'
LP	1	(Samoa) Logovi'i Mulipola (substituted off) 75'
Substitutions:
HK	16	(England) Rob Hawkins (substituted on) 68'
PR	17	(England) Fraser Balmain (substituted on) 75'
PR	18	(Italy) Martin Castrogiovanni (substituted on) 68'
LK	19	(England) Ed Slater (substituted on) 56'
FL	20	(Tonga) Steve Mafi (substituted on) 73'
SH	21	(England) Sam Harrison (substituted on) 75'
FH	22	(England) George Ford (substituted on) 24'
WG	23	(England) Matt Smith (substituted on) 75'
Coach:
(England) Richard Cockerill

FB	15	(England) Ben Foden (substituted off) 68'
RW	14	(Samoa) Ken Pisi
OC	13	(New Zealand) James Wilson
IC	12	(England) Luther Burrell
LW	11	(England) Jamie Elliott (substituted off) 40'
FH	10	(England) Stephen Myler (substituted off) 68'
SH	9	(England) Lee Dickson (substituted off) 68'
N8	8	(United States) Samu Manoa
OF	7	(England) Tom Wood
BF	6	(England) Phil Dowson (substituted off) 68'
RL	5	(England) Christian Day (substituted off) 60'
LL	4	(England) Courtney Lawes
TP	3	(South Africa) Brian Mujati (substituted off) 57'
HK	2	(England) Dylan Hartley (c) (red card) 40+1'
LP	1	(Tonga) Soane Tongaʻuiha (substituted off) 56'
Substitutions:
HK	16	(England) Mike Haywood (substituted on) 40'
PR	17	(England) Alex Waller (substituted on) 56'
PR	18	(England) Tom Mercey (substituted on) 57'
FL	19	(England) Ben Nutley (substituted on) 68'
LK	20	(South Africa) Gerrit-Jan van Velze (substituted on) 60'
SH	21	(Wales) Martin Roberts (substituted on) 68'
FH	22	(England) Ryan Lamb (substituted on) 68'
FB	23	(Samoa) George Pisi (substituted on) 68'
Coach:
(England) Jim Mallinder

== Leading scorers ==
Note: Flags indicate national union as has been defined under WR eligibility rules. Players may hold more than one non-WR nationality.

=== Most points ===
Rank	Player	Club	Points
1	(New Zealand) Nick Evans	Harlequins	258
2	(England) Freddie Burns	Gloucester	250
3	(Ireland) Gareth Steenson	Exeter Chiefs	244
4	(England) Andy Goode	Worcester Warriors	224
5	(England) Charlie Hodgson	Saracens	212
6	(England) Stephen Myler	Northampton Saints	187
7	(England) Toby Flood	Leicester Tigers	181
8	(Scotland) Gordon Ross	London Welsh	173
9	(England) Owen Farrell	Saracens	135
10	(Wales) Stephen Jones	London Wasps	116

=== Most tries ===
Rank	Player	Club	Tries
1	(England) Tom Varndell	London Wasps	13
1	(England) Christian Wade	London Wasps	13
3	(England) Jamie Elliott	Northampton Saints	10
4	(England) Danny Care	Harlequins	8
4	(England) Jonny May	Gloucester	8
4	(England) David Strettle	Saracens	8
7	(England) Adam Thompstone	Leicester Tigers	7
8	(Argentina) Horacio Agulla	Bath	6
8	(England) Chris Ashton	Saracens	6
8	(Tonga) Halani Aulika	London Irish	6
8	(England) Luther Burrell	Northampton Saints	6
8	(Samoa) David Lemi	Worcester Warriors	6
8	(England) Ugo Monye	Harlequins	6
8	(England) Nick Scott	London Welsh	6
8	(England) Tom Williams	Harlequins	6
