= Sir Samuel Hayes, 1st Baronet =

Sir Samuel Hayes, 1st Baronet (1737–1807) of Drumboe Castle, County Donegal was a Baronet in the Baronetage of Ireland and Member of Parliament for Augher in the Irish House of Commons between 1783 and 1790.

== Family ==
Hayes’s father Charles Hayes of Bridgwater, Somerset, who married Deborah Holditch of Totnes, Devon, was vice-consul in Lisbon.

Samuel worked as a London surgeon and then married Mary Basil, only heiress of valuable estate of Drumboe in the north of Ireland. She was daughter of Wilton Park, Buckinghamshire and Drumboe Castle.

Ball's Name Act 1724
- Act of Parliament
- Parliament of Great Britain
- Long title: An Act to enable William Ball Esquire and his Heirs to take and use the Surname of Basil.
- Citation: 11 Geo. 1. c. 2 Pr.
- Territorial extent: Great Britain

Dates
- Royal assent: 16 December 1724
- Commencement: 12 November 1724 (Note: Start of session.)

Status: Current legislation

William Basil previously had previous been called William Ball; he had changed his name by a private act of Parliament, Ball's Name Act 1724 (11 Geo. 1. c. 2 Pr.).

The children from this marriage included:

- Sir Samuel Hayes, 2nd Baronet
- Mary Hayes, married Revd. Andrew Thomas Hamilton, brother of Sir John Hamilton, 1st Baronet, of Woodbrook
- Frances Hayes, married John Boyd of Ballymacool, County Donegal

== Career ==
He represented Augher in the Irish House of Commons between 1783 and 1790. He was Governor of County Donegal between 1781 and 1807.

== Notes ==
Parliament of Ireland
Preceded by Henry Vaughan Brooke; William Richardson	Member of Parliament for Augher; 1783–1790; With: William Richardson	Succeeded by Edmond Stanley; Thomas Coghlan
Baronetage of Ireland
New creation	Baronet (of Drumboe Castle); 1789–1807	Succeeded by Samuel Hayes
