= Lewis Richardson =

Lewis Richardson may refer to:

- Lewis Fry Richardson (1881–1953), English mathematician and meteorologist
- Lewis Richardson (boxer) (born 1997), English boxer
- Lewis Richardson (footballer) (born 2003), English footballer
- Sir Lewis Richardson, 1st Baronet (1873–1934), British-born South African businessman
- Lewis Richardson (Hollyoaks), fictional character from British soap opera Hollyoaks
