= Sir James Anderson =

Sir James Anderson may refer to:

- Sir James Anderson, 1st Baronet (1792–1861), Irish inventor
- Sir James Anderson (British politician) (1800–1864), lord provost of Glasgow and British MP for Stirling
- Sir James Anderson (sea captain) (1824–1893), captain of SS Great Eastern laying transatlantic telegraph cable
- Sir James Norman Dalrymple Anderson (1908–1994), British missionary and academic Arabist
- Sir James Anderson (cricketer) (born 1982), English international cricketer with the most wickets (704) taken by a fast bowler in test cricket
