= Edmund Hayes =

Edmund Hayes may refer to:

- Edmund Hayes (judge) (1804–1867), Irish judge
- Edmund B. Hayes (1849–1923), American engineer and businessman
- Sir Edmund Samuel Hayes (1806–1860), Member of Parliament for County Donegal
- Sir Edmund Francis Hayes, 5th Baronet (1850–1912)
