= Sir James Galbraith, 1st Baronet =

Irish politician

Sir James Galbraith, 1st Baronet (c. 1759 – 30 April 1827) was an Irish politician.

== Biography ==
Galbraith was the son of James Galbraith, of Derry, by Elizabeth Whitehill, daughter of John Whitehill, of Clagh, County Londonderry. He represented Augher in the Irish House of Commons between 1798 and 1800. In 1813 he was created a baronet, of Shanevalley in the County of Donegall. Galbraith married Rebecca Dorothea Hamilton, daughter and co-heir of John Hamilton, of Castlefin. They had five daughters. He died in April 1827 when the title became extinct.

Parliament of Ireland
Preceded by Edmond Stanley; John Stewart	Member of Parliament for Augher; 1798–1800; With: William Bailey	Parliament of the United Kingdom
Baronetage of the United Kingdom
New creation	Baronet (of Shanwally); 1813–1827	Extinct
Preceded by Sheaffe baronets	Galbraith baronets of Boston; 20 January 1813	Succeeded by Anderson baronets
