= Henry Mervyn =

Henry Mervyn may refer to:

- Sir Henry Mervyn (died 1646), English MP for Hindon (UK Parliament constituency)
- Henry Mervyn (died 1699), Irish MP for Augher (Parliament of Ireland constituency) and County Tyrone
- Henry Mervyn (died 1748), Irish MP for Augher and County Tyrone (Parliament of Ireland constituency)
