= Samuel Hays =

Samuel Hays may refer to:

- Samuel Hays (Missouri politician), State Treasurer of Missouri from 1871 to 1873
- Samuel Hays (Pennsylvania politician) (1783–1868), United States Congress representative for Pennsylvania
- Samuel J. Hays (c. 1802–1866), American militia general and slave owner
- Samuel Lewis Hays (1794–1871), United States Congress representative for Virginia
- Samuel P. Hays (1921–2017), American historian
- S. H. Hays (1864–1934), mayor of Boise, Idaho from 1916 to 1919
  - Samuel Hays House, Boise, Idaho

== See also ==
- Samuel Hayes (disambiguation)
- Samuel Ross Hay, American Methodist bishop
