= John Anderson (Scottish businessman) =

Scottish businessman and entrepreneur (1747–1820)

- Born: 1747; Portland, Dumfriesshire
- Died: 1820 (aged 72–73)
- Occupations: businessman; entrepreneur

John Anderson (1747–1820) was a Scottish businessman and entrepreneur. He was a commercial agent in New York and later a business owner in Cork. His business played a pivotal role in creating infrastructure that connected Dublin to Cork. Anderson purchased land in Fermoy that was later used as a military complex.

== Career ==
Anderson was born into a poor family at Portland near Dumfries, Scotland and moved to Glasgow in 1784. He later settled in Cork City, at that time the major provisioning centre on the Atlantic Coast. During the American wars he earned considerable sums as a commercial agent in New York, and made extensive land purchases in the Cork area.

His Cork enterprise was based at Lapp's Island, and his business acumen was recognised as he grew rapidly in fortune and was appointed to the city's committee of merchants. He was made a Freeman of the city in 1787. Among his business interests was a malting and warehouse complex at Ballinacurra on Cork Harbour in partnership with John Lapp, in the 1780s. In common with many Cork merchants he was in favour of union with Great Britain in 1800. Anderson's Quay in Cork is called after him. He married a Miss Semple and had two daughters and two sons, one of whom, James Caleb Anderson (1782–1861), was a noted experimenter with steam-driven road vehicles.

His fortunes suffered a series of reversals with the fall in the value of land after the Napoleonic Wars, and he lost over £30,000 in a Welsh mining venture. He had been conducting banking business and with the economic downturn his bank collapsed in 1816.

=== Development of roads and coaching ===
Anderson secured the equivalent of a government franchise to provide a mail service from Dublin to Cork. This involved the building of an extensive infrastructure of roads, bridges, inns and stage coach stations. By 1789 he was the dominant partner in the Dublin–Cork turnpike and mail line, which was extended to Limerick in 1793. Its paramount achievement was getting from Dublin to Cork within 24 hours, the first Royal Mail arriving in Cork 8 July 1789.

=== Founding of Fermoy ===
Anderson purchased lands in the Fermoy area in 1791 and responded to a British government demand for military barracks by offering to build to their order in Fermoy. The first barracks was for 1400 troops and 100 horses, later increased to a total of 3300 men. Soon a vast military complex with workshops and ancillary services together with coach workshops were functioning.
