= Somerset, Coleraine =

Somerset was the Anglicised name for an Irish estate near Coleraine, on which a succession of country houses were built. The formation of the estate dates back to the Plantation of Ulster, when it became the property of the Merchant Taylors' Company.

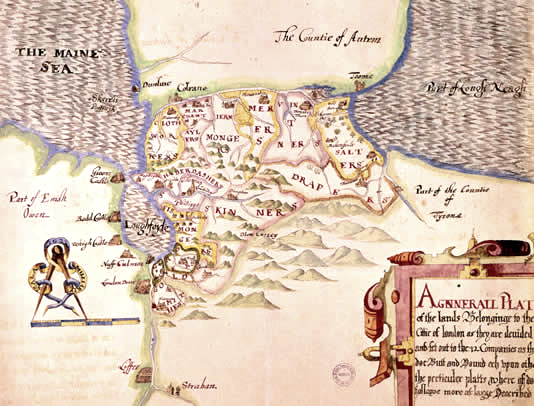
Map of 1622 (north is to the left), showing Coleraine on the River Bann, and to the west (i.e. below) the area allocated to the Merchant Taylors' Company

== Gorges family ==
In the period after the Act for the Settlement of Ireland 1652, Col. John Gorges of Somerset, Coleraine was three times a member of parliament for the Counties of Derry, Donegal and Tyrone, before 1660. He was an officer of the New Model Army under Oliver Cromwell who settled at Somerset. In 1660 he was chosen by the Irish Society of London as their agent for their County Londonderry estates. He was later in the Irish House of Commons, replacing John Godbold in 1665. His son John (died 1680) matriculated at Wadham College, Oxford in 1670. Another son Henry died in 1727, and his widow in 1729, and the Merchant Taylors' estate in Macosquin and Aghadowey parishes, with Somerset House, was sold.

== Richardson family ==
William Richardson bought the estate, of which he is said to have been the manager, in 1729. It became the seat of the Richardson family. The Somerset House built in 1732 burned down in 1802.

On Richardson's death in 1755, the Somerset estate passed to his nephew the Rev. John Richardson, son of his brother John. It was inherited by the Rev. John's son John, member of the Irish parliament for Newtown Limavady. He married, but left no heir on his death in 1800.

John Nash was active in co. Tyrone in the period 1800 to 1820. He left a drawing for Somerset House, Coleraine, made for a Mr Richardson. It is assumed this is for work not carried out. In the 19th century Somerset House was a villa in the style of Sir Richard Morrison.

In the memoirs of Frederick Young by his daughter, Somerset appears as "a fine large property ... including a beautiful salmon leap on the River Bann", owned by "Tom Richardson" (the Rev. Thomas Rumbold Richardson), a cleric and brother-in-law via a cousin marriage to Young. He held the living of Camus juxta Bann, cum Macosquin, from 1820 to his death in 1837.

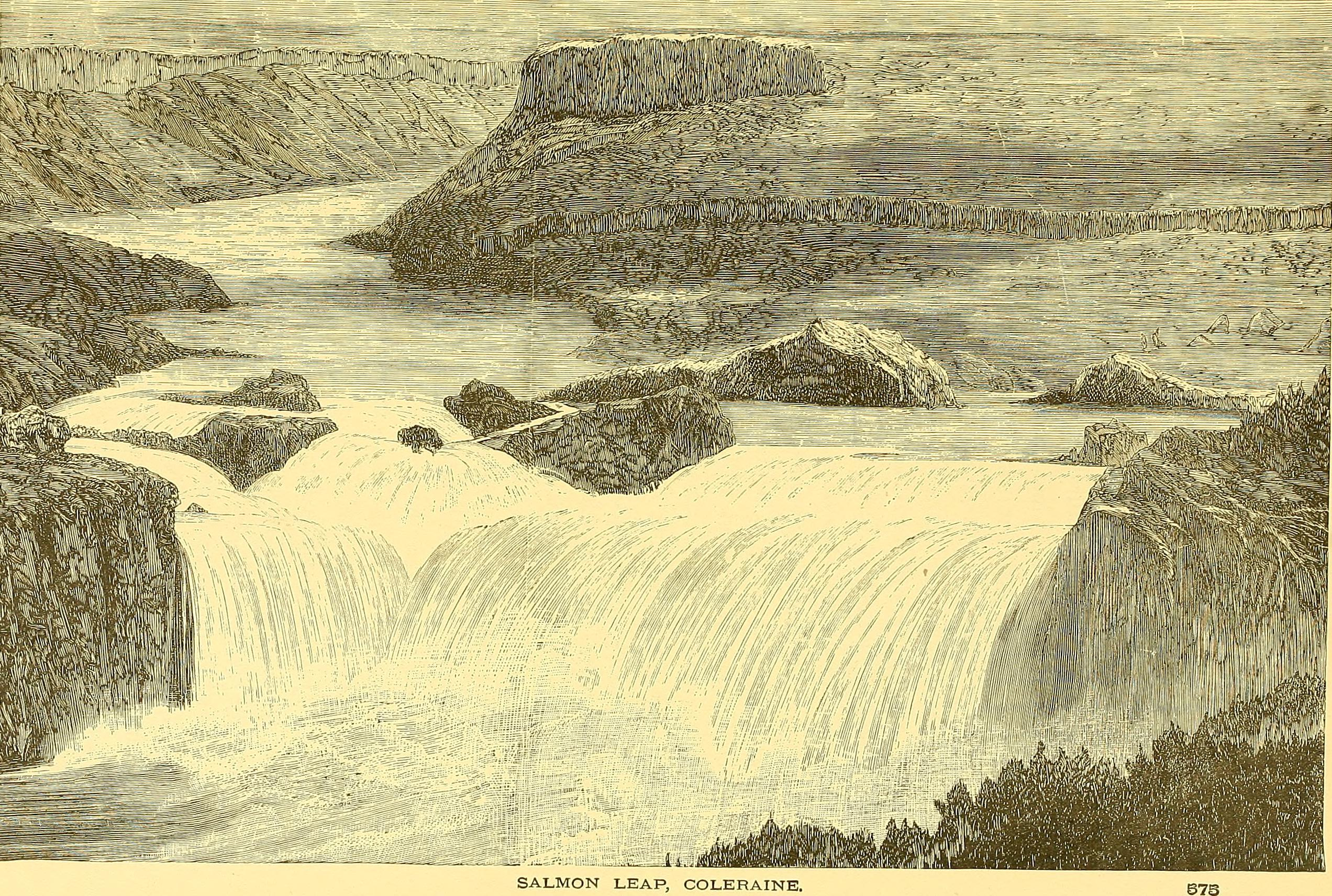
"A mile above Coleraine, the Bann, having borne the overflowings of Lough Neagh for twenty-five miles, falls over the salmon leap, a ledge thirteen feet high, where it meets salt water, and thence as a broad tidal stream, mingles with the ocean five miles farther."

== Torrens family ==
The estate passed to the Torrens family, with the marriage of Barbara Maria Richardson, heiress with her sister Maria Frederica to the Rev. Richardson when the male line failed, to the Rev. Thomas Henry Torrens.

== Later ownership ==
During the period of the Irish Land Acts, the estate was offered in 1894 for purchase to its tenants, and much of it was sold. Somerset House was sold in 1912 by the Torrens family to James Stuart, uncle of Francis Stuart. From Ballyhivistock near Dervock, he had been a successful sheep farmer in Australia.

The residual Somerset estate became industrial property in the 20th century, and Somerset House was demolished by the 1980s, when Chemstrand Ltd owned the land.
