= Richardson-Bunbury baronets =

Irish title

The Richardson, later Richardson-Bunbury Baronetcy, of Augher in the County of Tyrone, is a title in the Baronetage of Ireland. It was created on 30 August 1787 for William Richardson. The family is originally of Scottish descent. The second baronet assumed in 1822 his grandmother's surname of Bunbury.

The family seat was Augher Castle, near Augher, County Tyrone.

== Richardson, later Richardson-Bunbury baronets, of Augher (1787) ==
- Sir William Richardson, 1st Baronet (died 1830)
- Sir James Mervyn Richardson-Bunbury, 2nd Baronet (1781–1851)
- Sir John Richardson-Bunbury, 3rd Baronet (1813–1909)
- Sir Mervyn William Richardson-Bunbury, 4th Baronet (1874–1952)
- Sir (Richard David) Michael Richardson-Bunbury, 5th Baronet (1927–2017)
- Sir Thomas William Richardson-Bunbury, 6th Baronet (born 1965), Headmaster of Papplewick School, known professionally as Tom Bunbury

The heir apparent is his son Harry William Richardson-Bunbury (born 2002).

== See also ==
- Richardson baronets
- Bunbury baronets
