= Sir Samuel Hercules Hayes, 4th Baronet =

Irish baronet (1840–1901)

- Predecessor: Edmund Samuel Hayes
- Successor: Sir Edmund Francis Hayes, 5th Baronet
- Born: 3 February 1840
- Died: 6 November 1901 (aged 61)
- Spouse: Alice Anne Hewitt
- Father: Sir Edmund Samuel Hayes, 3rd Baronet
- Mother: Emily Pakenham

Sir Samuel Hercules Hayes, 4th Baronet (3 February 1840 – 6 November 1901) of Drumboe Castle, County Donegal was a Baronet in the Baronetage of Ireland and High Sheriff of Donegal from 1884 to 1887.

== Family ==
Hayes was born in 1840 the son of Sir Edmund Samuel Hayes, 3rd Baronet and his wife Emily Pakenham, daughter of Lieutenant-General the Honourable Sir Hercules Pakenham, a son of the Earl of Longford.

Hayes was educated at Harrow, and succeeded his father Sir Edmund Samuel Hayes, 3rd Baronet as baronet in 1860 and inherited the family estate of Drumboe Castle in County Donegal.

Hayes married, on 25 July 1878, Honourable Alice Anne Hewitt, daughter of James Hewitt, 4th Viscount Lifford and Lady Mary Acheson on. They left no issue.

== Career ==
Hayes signed up to the 10th (North Lincoln) Regiment of Foot on 13 March 1858 and became Lieutenant on 30 August 1859, and promoted to Captain in the 2nd Regiment of Life Guards 27 February 1867. He retired from the army in 1872.

Hayes was a magistrate and Deputy Lieutenant for County Donegal, and served as High Sheriff of Donegal from 1884 to 1887.

Baronetage of Ireland
Preceded by Edmund Samuel Hayes	Baronet (of Drumboe Castle); 1860–1901	Succeeded by Edmund Francis Hayes
