= Papplewick School =

Coordinates: 51.421°N 0.678°W

Papplewick School Ascot

Location
- Windsor Road; Ascot, Berkshire, SL5 7LH; England

Information
- Type: Private preparatory day and boarding
- Religious affiliation: Church of England
- Established: 1947
- Local authority: Windsor and Maidenhead
- Chair of Governors: A.A.M. Try
- Headmaster: Tom Bunbury
- Gender: Boys
- Age: 6 (Year 2) to 13 (Year 8)
- Enrolment: 220~
- Former pupils: Old Papplewickians
- Website: http://www.papplewick.org.uk

Papplewick School is a non-selective private preparatory school for boys aged 6–13 (Years 2–8) in Ascot, England. It occupies a 15-acre semi-rural campus across from Ascot Racecourse.

== History ==
It was founded in 1947 as a small boys' school and grew under long-serving headmaster Peter Knatchbull-Hugessen. The school became a charitable trust in 1964 under a board of governors. Extensive additions to the accommodation were carried out in 1998 under a building programme which included a sports hall, music school and two technology suites.

== Academics ==
All boys generally take English, Maths, Science, French, Classics, History, Geography, Philosophy, Theology and Religion, Design & Technology (DT), Art, ICT, PE and Reasoning. Common Entrance Exam prep begins in Year 7.

Many leavers often go on to public schools such as Charterhouse, Eton College, Harrow School, Tonbridge School and Winchester College.

== Extracurricular activities ==
Sport is an important aspect of school life and a wide range of sports are available. The main sports are football (Michaelmas Term), rugby (Lent Term) and cricket (Summer Term). Besides the main sports, boys may represent the school in squash, swimming, cross-country, hockey, polo, shooting, table tennis, and chess. The cricket and football teams regularly tour abroad during the holidays. Papplewick is also home to the youngest antiquarian booksellers in the world and now members of the PBFA (Provincial Booksellers Fairs Association), the Bibliomaniacs.

Thursday afternoons are generally devoted to extracurricular activities. Activities available range from interest clubs, music, riding, drama and chess.

== Boarding ==
About half of the boys in the school are boarders. Weekly boarders go home at the week-end, full boarders usually only in school holidays and at half-terms. Boys aged 11 (Year 6) and above must be either full or weekly boarders, while many younger boys board on a flexible basis. They are grouped by years and looked after by three sets of "houseparents" per year group. The boarding programme was rated "outstanding" by Ofsted in its 2011 social care inspection.

== Heads ==
- 1950–1979: Peter Merrick Knatchbull-Hugessen (5 June 1915 – 7 February 2008)
- 1981-1989: Stuart Morris
- 1991-2003: Rhidian Llewellyn
- 2004 – present: Tom Bunbury

== Notable former pupils ==
- Ed Coode, British rower and Olympic gold medallist
- James Haskell, England rugby union international
- Bo Guagua, socialite and son of Bo Xilai
- Richard Curtis, screenwriter whose works include Bernard & The Genie, The Tall Guy and Bridget Jones: The Edge of Reason, and founder of the prestigious Barnard Scholarship for Gifted Youngsters.
- Max Lahiff, Rugby Union

== Historic safeguarding concerns ==
=== Edward Phillips-Smith ===
In January 2024, Edward Phillips-Smith, a retired priest and former Papplewick School chaplain, was sentenced at Oxford Crown Court to 32 months' imprisonment after pleading guilty to historic child sexual offences committed in Staffordshire in the early 1980s.

In November 2025, Phillips-Smith pleaded guilty at Cannock Magistrates' Court to two further offences concerning a boy in Brewood, Staffordshire, between 1982 and 1983. Later that month, the BBC reported that Thames Valley Police had reopened an investigation into a complaint of "inappropriate behaviour" concerning Phillips-Smith's subsequent employment at Papplewick, where he served as chaplain from 1993 to 2008. The BBC reported that the school's governing board had commissioned an independent review of records relating to his employment, which identified "some concerns about his behaviour"; the review was not made public, but was provided to police and the local authority.

In January 2026, Phillips-Smith was charged with two additional offences concerning an 11-year-old boy in Wolverhampton between 1978 and 1980. Sentencing in the Wolverhampton and Staffordshire cases was subsequently postponed while medical reports were obtained after the court was told that he had cancer.

On 20 July 2026, Phillips-Smith was sentenced at Wolverhampton Crown Court to concurrent two-year community orders for the four further offences. The court heard that he had terminal cancer. The judge said that Phillips-Smith had misused a position of trust and that his 2024 prison sentence would have been longer had the additional offences been dealt with at the same time.

The BBC subsequently reported disappointment among victims following the sentence. One victim said that those abused by Phillips-Smith deserved "more justice", while Papplewick said it recognised that the further sentencing might revive difficult memories for former pupils and staff.

In a statement published after the sentencing, Papplewick's governing board said its review had found that concerns about Phillips-Smith's behaviour were raised during his employment, but that no evidence had met the threshold for a criminal investigation. The board acknowledged that this did not rule out the possibility that harm had occurred at Papplewick, apologised to anyone who might have been affected by his behaviour, and encouraged former pupils and staff with concerns to contact the school, police or the Local Authority Designated Officer.

=== Jonathan Button ===
In 2007, the Richmond and Twickenham Times reported that Jonathan Button was sentenced at Kingston Crown Court to 12 months' imprisonment after admitting specimen counts of possessing indecent images of children. The newspaper also reported that Button had previous convictions in 1999, including imprisonment after admitting indecently assaulting boys while employed as a science teacher at a private school in Berkshire during the 1980s.

Earlier reporting in the same newspaper described Button's 2007 court appearance and interim restrictions imposed pending sentence.

A 1998 report in The People named Papplewick School in connection with an allegation of indecent assault in the 1980s involving Button, and said the matter was being investigated by police at the time.
