= Robert Byron (Royalist) =

Sir Robert Byron (1611 – 1673) was an English Royalist soldier and official who spent much of his career in Ireland.

Byron was the son of Sir John Byron of Newstead Abbey and Anne Molyneux. He was a younger brother of John Byron, 1st Baron Byron and Richard Byron, 2nd Baron Byron, and a grandson of Sir John Byron.

Byron's family had interests in Ireland, and he was the Member of Parliament for Augher in the Irish House of Commons from 1639 to 1649. He fought for the English Crown in the Irish Rebellion of 1641. The following year he aligned himself to Charles I of England in the Irish Confederate Wars and English Civil War, and raised his own regiment, Sir Robert Byron's Regiment of Foot, in 1643 under the authority of the Marquess of Ormond. His regiment, largely comprising Irish mercenaries, was moved to England and fought in the Battle of Nantwich in January 1644. On 12 May 1644 Byron was knighted. Byron's regiment then joined Prince Rupert of the Rhine's forces and Byron was installed as Military Governor of Liverpool after the city fell to the Royalists in June 1644. Byron was forced to surrender Liverpool to the Parliamentarians in November 1644 when his Irish mercenaries mutinied. Byron joined his brother's garrison in Chester, where he was taken prisoner in April 1645.

Following the final defeat of the Royalists, Byron remained under suspicion from Cromwell's regime in Ireland and he was imprisoned on at least one occasion. After the Stuart Restoration, he was appointed Master-General of the Irish Board of Ordnance in 1663 and made a member of the Privy Council of Ireland in 1664. He died in 1673.

Parliament of Ireland
Preceded by Robert Meredyth; Sir James Erskine	Member of Parliament for Augher; 1639–1649; With: William Peasley (1639–1641); Robert Martin (1641–1649)	Succeeded by Henry Mervyn; Richard Palfrey
