= Sir Edmund Francis Hayes, 5th Baronet =

Sir Edmund Francis Hayes, 5th Baronet (1850–1912) of Drumboe Castle in the County of Donegal, was a Baronet in the Baronetage of Ireland.

== Family ==
He was born in 1850 the son of Sir Edmund Samuel Hayes, 3rd Baronet and his wife Emily Pakenham, daughter of Lieutenant-General the Honourable Sir Hercules Pakenham, a son of Lord Longford.

Until he inherited the family estate of Drumboe Castle in County Donegal in Ulster in 1901 on the death of his brother, Sir Samuel Hercules Hayes, 4th Baronet, he lived in Como, Potts Point, Sydney, Australia.

He married Alice Isabella Wilkinson, daughter of Judge Wilkinson of Sydney on 24 February 1900.

He died on 27 January 1912 in Drumboe Castle. On his death the title of the Hayes Baronets of Drumboe Castle became extinct.

Lady Alice Hayes died in 1933 from injuries sustained after stepping in front of a tramcar on 28 September 1933 in Sydney.

Baronetage of Ireland
| Preceded by Samuel Hercules Hayes | Baronet (of Drumboe Castle); 1901–1912 | Extinct |
