= John Richardson (dean of Kilmacduagh) =

Irish Anglican priest (1669–1747)

John Richardson (1669–1747) was a Church of Ireland minister in Ireland.

Richardson was born in County Tyrone, the son of William Richardson of Tullyreavey, near Cookstown; William Richardson who represented Augher in the Parliament of Ireland was his brother. He was educated at Trinity College, Dublin. He held livings at Annagh, County Cavan and Belturbet

Richardson was a strong advocate for the use in the Church of Ireland of the Irish language. His efforts earned him the hostility of Archbishop Thomas Lindsay. Lindsay's successor Hugh Boulter was more sympathetic, and Richardson had preferment, being Dean of Kilmacduagh from 1731 until his death.
