= Sir William Richardson, 1st Baronet =

Irish politician (1749–1830)

Sir William Richardson, 1st Baronet (after 1749 – 29 October 1830) was an Irish politician.

He was the son and heir of St George Richardson, MP for Augher (1755–1760) and Elizabeth Bunbury, daughter of Benjamin Bunbury of Kilfeacle, County Tipperary.

He was the Member of Parliament (MP) for Augher from 1783 to 1790 and Ballyshannon, Ireland from 1798 to 1801.

He was created a baronet on 30 August 1787 and served as High Sheriff of Tyrone in 1789.

He married twice: firstly, Mary, widow of Carey Hamilton, and daughter and coheir of William Newburgh, of Ballyhaise, County Cavan, a son of Colonel Brockhill Newburgh, and secondly Eliza Richardson, daughter of the Reverend Galbraith Richardson. By the two marriages he had at least four children. He was succeeded by his son Sir James Mervyn Richardson, who changed his surname by royal licence on 20 April 1822 to Richardson-Bunbury to commemorate his mother's family.

Baronetage of Ireland
New creation	Baronet (of Augher); 1787–1830	Succeeded by James Richardson-Bunbury
