= Sir Samuel Hayes, 2nd Baronet =

Sir Samuel Hayes, 2nd Baronet (1773–1827) of Drumboe Castle, County Donegal was a Baronet in the Baronetage of Ireland.

== Family ==
He was the son of Sir Samuel Hayes, 1st Baronet.

He married Elizabeth Lighton, daughter of Sir Thomas Lighton, 1st Baronet MP of Merville, County Dublin. The children from this marriage included:

- Sir Edmund Samuel Hayes, 3rd Baronet (2 July 1806 - 23 June 1860)
- Anne Hayes - married on 11 February 1829, Revd. Robert Traill, Rector of Schull, County Cork.
- Harriet Hayes
- Mary Hayes (d. 1874) - married Francis Mansfield of Castle Wray and Ardrummon House, County Donegal.

== Career ==
Baronetage of Ireland
Preceded by Samuel Hayes	Baronet (of Drumboe Castle); 1807–1827	Succeeded by Samuel Edward Hayes
