= William Richardson (died 1755) =

Member of Parliament for Augher, Ireland

William Richardson (c.1690–1755) was the Member of Parliament for Augher, Ireland, from 1737 to 1755. His elder brother Archibald had been member for Augher in 1692.

== Life ==
He was the son of William Richardson of Tullyreavey, near Cookstown, and brother of the Rev. John Richardson. He was an agent for the Irish Society of London, and made a fortune. He bought the Merchant Taylors Company estate near Coleraine, of which he is said to have been the manager, in 1729.

The estate had the English name of Somerset, and became the seat of the Richardson family. Richardson married Mary Eyles, fourth daughter of Sir Francis Eyles, 1st Baronet. The original Somerset House built in 1732 burned down in 1802.

== Somerset estate descent ==
On Richardson's death in 1755, the Somerset estate passed to his nephew the Rev. John Richardson, son of his brother John. It was inherited by the Rev. John's son John, member of the Irish parliament for Newtown Limavady. He married, but left no heir on his death in 1800.

John Nash was active in County Tyrone in the period 1800 to 1820. He left a drawing for Somerset House, Coleraine, made for a Mr Richardson. It is assumed this is for work not carried out. In the 19th century Somerset House was a villa in the style of Sir Richard Morrison.

In the memoirs of Frederick Young by his daughter, Somerset appears as "a fine large property ... including a beautiful salmon leap on the River Bann", owned by "Tom Richardson" (the Rev. Thomas Rumbold Richardson), a cleric and brother-in-law via a cousin marriage to Young. The estate passed to the Torrens family, with the marriage of Barbara Maria Richardson, heiress with her sister Maria Frederica to the Rev. Richardson, to the Rev. Thomas Henry Torrens. Ultimately, during the period of the Irish Land Acts, the estate was offered for purchase to its tenants, and much of it was sold.
