= Lapp's Island =

Island in Cork, Ireland

- Location within island of Ireland

Geography
- Location: Cork City
- Coordinates: 51°53′57″N 8°27′51″W

Administration
- Ireland
- County: County Cork

Demographics
- Ethnic groups: Irish

Lapp's Island was once an island in the River Lee. It is now joined with the island which forms the center of Cork City, Ireland and refers to the eastern tip of that island.

It was apparently named after an owner in the 17th century. The island had probably been reclaimed from swamp at that time. In the 18th century it was separated from the main island by a canal which roughly followed what is now Parnell Place. It was fully joined to the main island by 1832.

Custom's House, at the eastern extremity of the island, sits on what was called the tongue of Lapps's Island, and the modern Lapp's Quay sits on the southern shore of Lapp's Island.
