= Sir James Anderson, 1st Baronet =

Sir James Anderson Bt.
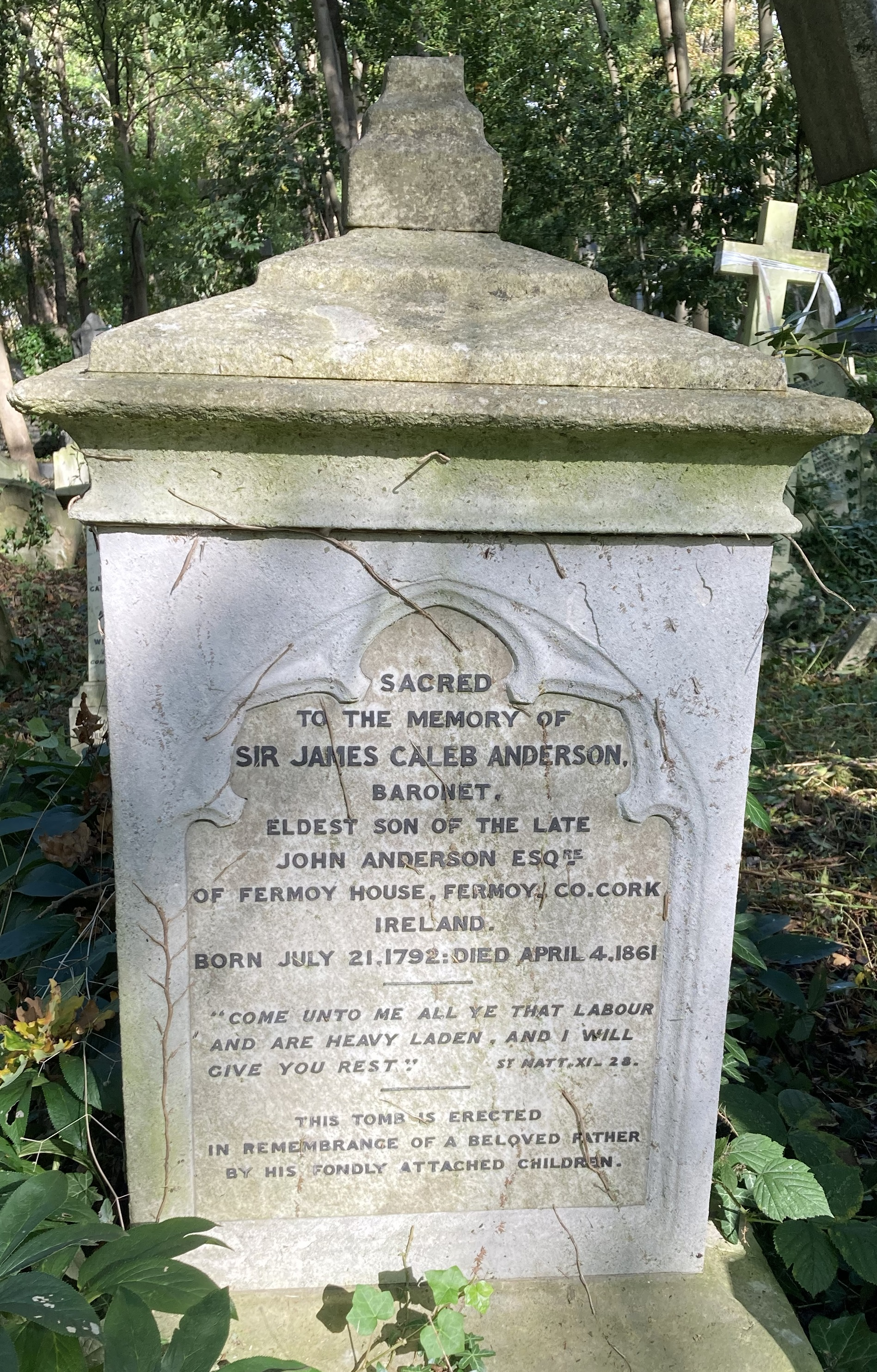
- Grave of James Caleb Anderson (Highgate Cemetery)
- Born: 21 July 1792; Fermoy
- Died: 4 April 1861 (aged 68); London
- Occupation: inventor
- Spouse: Caroline (née Shaw)
- Children: two sons and six daughters
- Father: John Anderson

Sir James Caleb Anderson, 1st Baronet (21 July 1792 – 4 April 1861), was an inventor.

== Biography ==
James Anderson was the eldest son of John Anderson, the founder of Fermoy, by his second wife, Elizabeth, the only daughter of Mr. James Semple, of Waterford. He was created a baronet on 22 March 1813, of Fermoy in the County of Cork, for the great public services rendered to Ireland by his father.

== Steam coaches ==
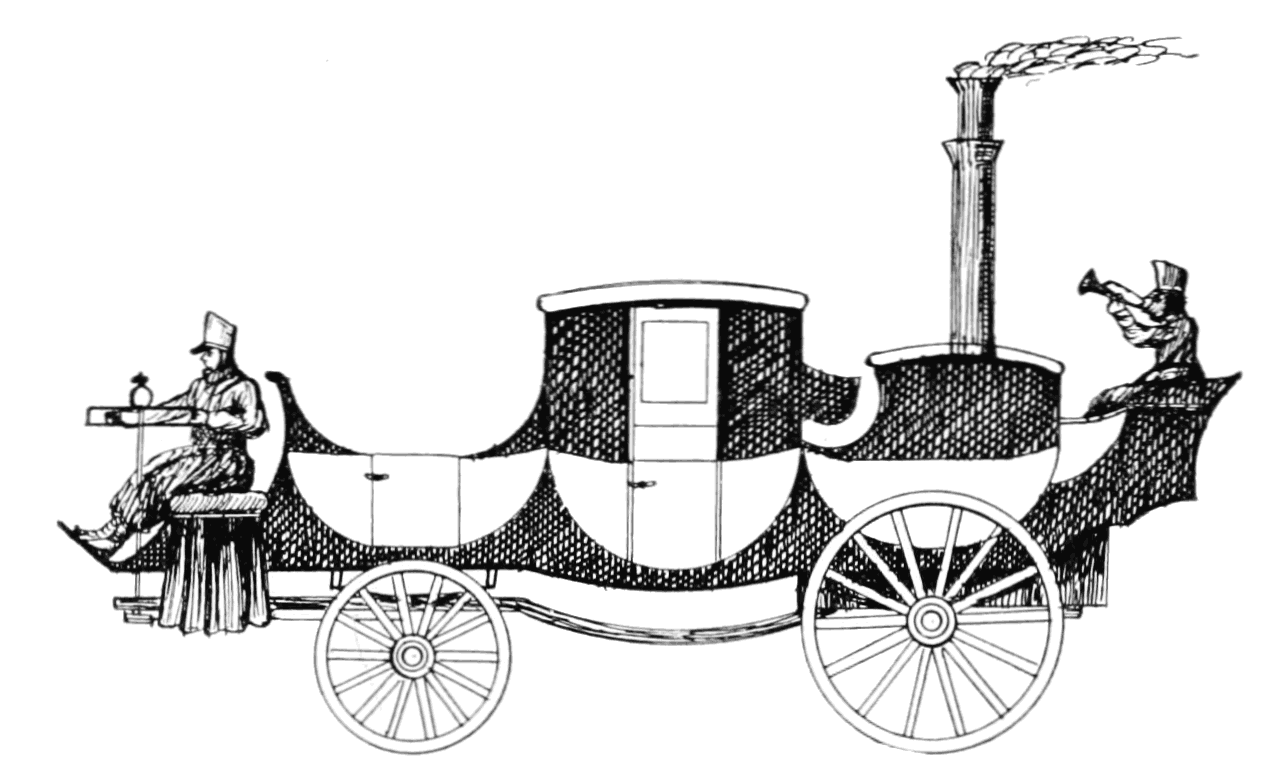
1810 steam coach, design by James Anderson and W. H. James

Anderson experimented with steam-coaching and took out various patents for his inventions. He lodged specifications in 1831 for "improvements in machinery for propelling vessels on water", in 1837 for "improvements in locomotive engines", and in 1846 for "certain improvements in obtaining motive power, and in applying it to propel carriages and vessels, and to the driving of machinery".

He worked with William Henry James of Birmingham, son of William James. Anderson was intending to back James's work, but around 1829 finding the cash proved difficult.

== Death ==
Anderson died in London on 4 April 1861 and was buried on the eastern side of Highgate Cemetery.

== Family ==
Anderson married in 1815 Caroline, fourth daughter of Robert Shaw, of Dublin, and half-sister of Sir Robert Shaw, 1st Baronet. They had two sons (both of whom died unmarried) and six daughters. As he left no male issue, the baronetcy became extinct.

Anderson baronets
- Escutcheon of the Anderson baronets of Fermoy
- Creation date: 1813
- Status: extinct
- Extinction date: 1861
- Motto: Stand sure

== Notes ==
Baronetage of the United Kingdom
Preceded by Galbraith baronets	Anderson baronets of Fermoy; 22 March 1813	Succeeded by Dudley baronets
