= Niall Morris (rugby union) =

- Born: Niall Edward Morris; 8 August 1988 (age 38) Dublin, Ireland
- Height: 1.88 m (6 ft 2 in)
- Weight: 88 kg (13.9 st)
- School: Blackrock College

Rugby union career
- Position(s): Wing, Fullback
Amateur team(s)
| Years | Team | Apps | (Points) |
- Blackrock College RFC
Senior career
| Years | Team | Apps | (Points) |
| 2009–11 | Leinster | 8 | (15) |
| 2011–16 | Leicester Tigers | 75 | (85) |
| 2016 | Leinster | 0 | (0) |
- Correct as of 24 May 2020
International career
| Years | Team | Apps | (Points) |
| 2007 | Ireland u19 | 4 | (5) |
| 2008 | Ireland u20 | 6 | (10) |
| 2013 | Emerging Ireland | 3 | (10) |
- Correct as of February 2016

Niall Edward Morris (born 8 August 1988) is a former Irish rugby union footballer who played wing or fullback for Leicester Tigers in the English Premiership.

Morris played for Leinster Rugby on a development contract, appearing for the first team eight times.

He joined Leicester in the summer of 2011. While at Leicester he started the 2013 Premiership final and scored a try as they defeated Northampton Saints. It was revealed by Leicester Tigers, that Morris was out of contract at the end of the 2015/2016 season, and wasn't being offered a new one.

In September 2013 Morris was called up for a training camp with the senior Ireland squad.
