= Richardson baronets =

Baronetcy in the Baronetage of the United Kingdom

There have been five baronetcies created for persons with the surname Richardson, one in the Baronetage of Nova Scotia, one in the Baronetage of Ireland and three in the Baronetage of the United Kingdom.

The Richardson Baronetcy, of Pencaithland in the County of Haddington, was created in the Baronetage of Nova Scotia on 13 November 1630. For more information on this creation, see Stewart-Richardson baronets.

The Richardson Baronetcy, of Augher in the County of Tyrone, was created in the Baronetage of Ireland on 30 August 1787. For more information on this creation, see Richardson-Bunbury baronets.

The Richardson Baronetcy, of Yellow Woods in the province of the Cape of Good Hope in South Africa, was created in the Baronetage of the United Kingdom on 26 January 1924 for Sir Lewis Richardson. He was head of the firm of L. Richardson & Co, of Port Elizabeth, London, New York and Boston.

The Richardson Baronetcy, of Weybridge in the County of Surrey, was created in the Baronetage of the United Kingdom on 26 July 1929 for the sports shooter and Conservative politician Philip Richardson. The title became extinct on the death of the third Baronet in 1981.

The Richardson Baronetcy, of Eccleshall in the County of York, was created in the Baronetage of the United Kingdom on 20 November 1963 for the prominent physician John Samuel Richardson. In 1979 he was created a life peer as Baron Richardson, of Lee in the County of Devon, in the Peerage of the United Kingdom. Both titles became extinct on his death in 2004.

== Richardson baronets, of Pencaithland (1630) ==
- see Stewart-Richardson baronets

== Richardson baronets, of Augher (1787) ==
- see Richardson-Bunbury baronets

== Richardson baronets, of Yellow Woods (1924) ==
- Sir Lewis Richardson, 1st Baronet (1873–1934)
- Sir Leslie Lewis Richardson, 2nd Baronet (1915–1985)
- Sir Anthony Lewis Richardson, 3rd Baronet (born 1950)

The heir apparent is the present holder's only son William Lewis Richardson (born 1992).

== Richardson baronets, of Weybridge (1929) ==
- Sir Philip Wigham Richardson, 1st Baronet (1865–1953)
- Sir William Wigham Richardson, 2nd Baronet (1893–1973)
- Sir George Wigham Richardson, 3rd Baronet (1895–1981)

== Richardson baronets, of Eccleshall (1963) ==
- Sir John Samuel Richardson, 1st Baronet (1910–2004) (created a life peer as Baron Richardson in 1979)
