= Matt Williams (rugby union, born 1988) =

English rugby union player

Matt Williams is an English rugby 7s international and player. He has played in the RFU Championship for London Scottish where he was a prolific try scorer, Moseley, Bristol Rugby Sale Sharks and Doncaster Knights.

He attended The John Fisher School in Purley, Surrey; a senior all boys Roman Catholic day school.
