= Max Lahiff =

English rugby union player

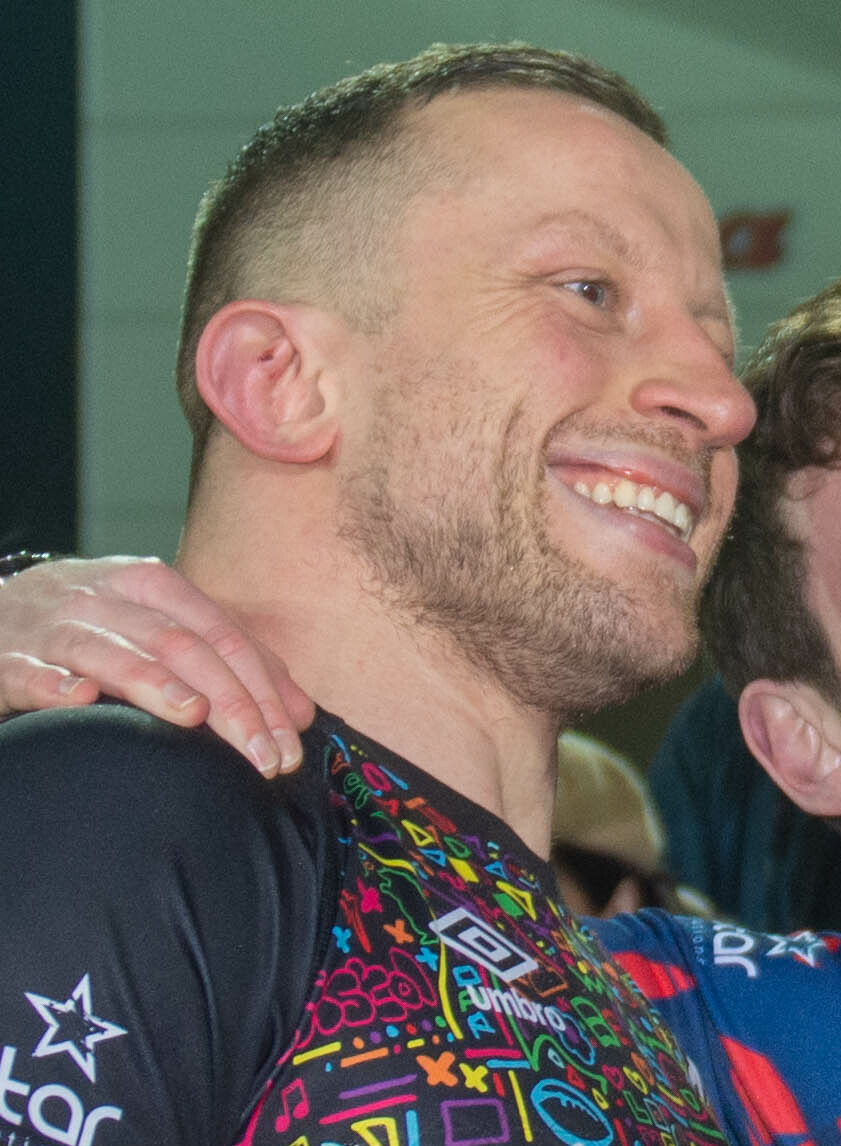
- Max Lahiff in 2023
- Born: Max Archie Lahiff; 9 December 1989 (age 36) London, England
- Height: 1.85 m (6 ft 1 in)
- Weight: 117 kg (258 lb; 18 st 6 lb)
- School: Papplewick School; Wellington College, Berkshire

Rugby union career
- Position(s): Loosehead Prop, Tighthead prop
Senior career
Years	Team	Apps	(Points)
2009-2013	London Irish	65	(5)
2011	→London Welsh	19	(0)
2015-2019	Bath	56	(15)
2019–	Bristol Bears	100	(20)
- Correct as of 20 January 2024
Provincial / State sides
Years	Team	Apps	(Points)
2013	Hawke's Bay	10	(0)
Super Rugby
Years	Team	Apps	(Points)
2014	Rebels	8	(0)

Max Lahiff (born 9 December 1989) is an English rugby union footballer who plays as a loosehead prop or tighthead prop for Bristol Bears in the Gallagher Premiership.

== Early life ==
Lahiff was born in London and was educated at Papplewick School in Ascot followed by Wellington College Berkshire where he was a member of the team that won the Under 18 Daily Mail Cup. He had spells with London Welsh and the London Irish Academy as a youngster.

== Career ==
He made his senior debut for London Irish against London Wasps in 2009 and made a total of 78 appearances in his 4 years playing for the Exiles. During this time he gained a reputation for strong scrummaging and a physically imposing style of play.

It was announced that he would leave Irish at the end of the 2012–13 season and link up with the Melbourne Rebels ahead of their 2014 Super Rugby campaign. He also spent a season playing ITM Cup rugby in New Zealand for the Hawke's Bay Magpies.

Lahiff qualifies to play international rugby for Australia through his father.

On 30 January 2015, Bath Rugby confirmed the signing of Lahiff with immediate effect. Rejoining Toby Booth and Neal Hatley, who were coaches at London Irish during his spell there, Lahiff was named in the squad to play Harlequins in the LV= Cup the next day.

Lahiff signed for French Top 14 side Clermont as cover during the 2019 Rugby World Cup, but the deal was called off due to a medical issue. Lahiff joined Bristol Bears on a one-year contract for the 2019-20 season which has since been extended.
