= Sir Lewis Richardson, 1st Baronet =

British-born South African businessman

Sir Lewis Richardson, 1st Baronet, CBE (2 February 1873 – 2 April 1934) was a British-born South African businessman.

Born in Birmingham, he went to Cape Colony in 1881. He was head of the firm L. Richardson & Co.

He was created a CBE in 1919, knighted in 1921, and a baronet, of Yellow Woods in the Province of the Cape of Good Hope in South Africa, in 1924.

== See also ==
- Richardson baronets
