= Gordon Ross (rugby union) =

Scotland international rugby union player (born 1978)

- Born: Gordon Ross; 8 March 1978 (age 48) Edinburgh
- Height: 5 ft 8 in (1.73 m)
- Weight: 16 st 12 lb (107 kg)

Rugby union career
- Position: Fly-half
Amateur team(s)
Years	Team	Apps	(Points)
- Heriots FP
Senior career
Years	Team	Apps	(Points)
2000–2002	Edinburgh		
2002–2006	Leeds Carnegie		
2006–2007	Castres		
2007–2009	Saracens		
2009–2015	London Welsh		
International career
Years	Team	Apps	(Points)
2001–2006	Scotland	25	
Coaching career
- Years: Team
- 2015–: Worcester Warriors

Gordon Ross (born 8 March 1978) is a Scottish rugby union footballer who played as a fly-half. He earned 25 caps for Scotland.

Ross represented Edinburgh and Scottish Schools at U16 and U18 level before going on to represent Scotland at U19 and at U21 levels. He attended George Heriot's School and started his senior career with Heriots before joining Edinburgh when Scotland opted for regional rugby in 2000.

The highlight of his early career was kicking the winning goal for Edinburgh Rugby against Biarritz Olympique in 1997 and beating England as part of the Scotland U19 squad in the same season. He played a pivotal role in Heriot's FP's second successive league title in 1999-00 and was duly rewarded with a professional contract with the Edinburgh Reivers.

== Club career ==
Ross stayed with the Reivers from 2000 until 2002, when he moved to Leeds and stayed until 2006. He was voted Man of the Match when they won the Powergen Cup in 2005 beating Bath 20–12, a game in which Ross scored two penalties and two conversions.

In 2006 he joined Castres for one season before moving on to Saracens, where he played for two seasons before joining London Welsh in 2009.

In his debut season at Welsh he scored 30 points in 26 appearances, and helped the club reach the Championship semi-finals, where they lost to Bristol.

Ross endured an injury disrupted 2010/11 campaign, picking up a groin injury in the win over Bristol at Old Deer Park in October. He returned in January against the Ulster Ravens and helped Welsh reach a second consecutive Championship semi-final. He made 23 appearances, scoring 212 points, including a late match winning penalty to beat Bedford.

Ross made 31 appearances during the 2011/12 season and racked up 110 points in the Championship, including a 16-point haul as Welsh beat his former club Leeds at Headingley on the opening weekend of the season.

His penalty with the last kick of the game gave Welsh an 18–16 win over London Scottish at Old Deer Park, while he landed a crucial drop goal in the first leg of the Championship final against the Cornish Pirates at Menneye Field.

Ross has played Heineken Cup rugby for Leeds, Castres, Edinburgh and Saracens, making 40 appearances in Europe, scoring 263 points.

== International career ==
A prodigious goal-kicker, Ross enjoyed a dream debut for Scotland with a record of 23 points in the 43–20 success against Tonga at Murrayfield in November 2001. Seven years later, during the Barclays Churchill Cup competition in North America, he set another record as the Scotland A team's top scorer. He passed Duncan Hodge's record of 126 points during a replacement appearance win against Argentina at Richardson Stadium in Kingston, Ontario. By the end of that 2008 tournament his tally in 16 Scotland A games was 140 points. They are the only players to have scored at least 100 points for Scotland A.

Later that year Ross took that record total to 150 points with five conversions in Scotland A's victory against Georgia at Firhill, Glasgow, and in February 2009 he extended his Scotland A appearances to 18 when he played as a replacement against Ireland A at the RDS, Dublin. A further A international appearance and seven points were added in the 22-all draw with Italy at McDiarmid Park, Perth, taking his points tally to 157.

Ross's first Test try was included in an 18-point haul in the 2003 RWC Countdown victory over Italy, also at Murrayfield, and he scored his first drop goal for Scotland in the 13–10 victory over Italy in the final match of the 2006 RBS 6 Nations. In 2002 his assurance and control were key factors in Scotland's Murrayfield win against South Africa. Earlier in the year he emerged as joint top scorer (36 points) on Scotland's tour of North America during which he played in all three midweek victories. Ross reached his Scotland A century while captaining the team in victory against Italy A at McDiarmid Park, Perth, in February 2007.

Ross kicked 17 points on his debut for Scotland A as they accounted for their Welsh counterparts 42–20 in February 2001. His goal-kicking was to the fore in the next A victory, too – the 33–13 success against Italy A in which he contributed 13 points. In February 2002 he kicked two goals from two attempts in quagmire conditions to ensure Scotland A opened their shadow Six Nations campaign with a 6–6 draw against their English counterparts. Better followed a fortnight later when his last-gasp conversion 20 metres from the right touchline earned the Scots a 30–29 victory over Italy A to which Ross contributed a total of 20 points, including a try. He had a full house in a haul of 18 points (try, penalty, two conversions and two drop goals) against Wales A at Wrexham in 2002. He played in seven A internationals in 2001 and 2002, and he returned to that level in the Perth match against Australia A in November 2006. He played in two wins in 2007 (against Italy A at McDiarmid Park and against the US at Henley in the Barclays Churchill Cup competition) as well as two more in 2008 (v Italy A in Mogliano and Ireland A) before that year's Churchill Cup.

During a time that the national team were lacking in depth at the number 10 position it is still a point of mystery to many Scotland fans as to why he never picked up further caps beyond the 25 he collected. A preference of Dan Parks by coaches Matt Williams and Frank Hadden, and eventual emergence of a more running fly-half in Phil Godman may have curtailed further call-up opportunities.

== Additional achievements ==
Ross played golf for Scottish Schools with a handicap of two and also played cricket at district level.

== Honours ==
- Powergen Cup/Anglo-Welsh Cup titles: 1
  - 2005
