= Nick Scott (rugby union) =

English rugby union player (born 1990)

- Born: Nick Scott; 13 June 1990 (age 36) Hereford, England
- Height: 186 cm (6 ft 1 in)
- Weight: 97 kg (15 st 4 lb)

Rugby union career
- Position: Winger
- Current team: London Scottish
Senior career
Years	Team	Apps	(Points)
2010–2012	Bath Rugby	38	(0)
2012–2015	London Welsh	84	(40)
2015–2017	Newport Gwent Dragons	14	(0)
2017-	London Scottish		
- Correct as of 3 November 2015

Nick Scott (born 13 June 1990) is an English rugby union player who plays for Richmond regional team as a winger.

Scott made his debut for the Newport Gwent Dragons regional team in 2015 having previously played for Bath Rugby, London Welsh, Newbury RFC and London Scottish.
