= Edmond Stanley =

Anglo-Irish lawyer and politician

Sir Edmond Stanley SL (1760–1843) was an Anglo-Irish lawyer and politician who served as Serjeant-at-Law of the Parliament of Ireland, Recorder of Prince of Wales Island, now Penang, and subsequently Chief Justice of Madras. The elopement of his teenage daughter Mary Anne in 1815 caused a notable scandal. His career was hampered by his enormous debts, as a result of which he was forced to resign his Irish office.

== Family ==
Born in Dublin in 1760, Stanley was baptised at St Werburgh's Church, Dublin, a parish situated next to Dublin Castle attended by the Lord Lieutenant of Ireland and members of the court. He was the son of James Stanley, an attorney, and his wife Jane Kelly, and grandson of Edward Stanley of Low Park, County Roscommon, the head of a colonial, Protestant Ascendancy family. He entered Trinity College Dublin in 1773, aged thirteen years old, was a scholar in 1777 and graduated B.A. in 1778. He entered the King's Inns where he was called to the Irish Bar, and the Inner Temple in London, and became a bencher of the King's Inns in 1789.

In 1786 he married Jane Talbot, daughter of the Reverend John Talbot of Mount Talbot, County Roscommon and his first wife Elizabeth Rose. They had one daughter Mary Anne, who married Captain Edward Trant Bontein in 1815. The marriage caused a considerable scandal as the couple eloped to Gretna Green when the bride was only 14; the groom, a widower, was 29.

== Political career ==
He entered the Parliament of Ireland as MP for Augher (1790–97) (together with Sir John Stewart, later Attorney General for Ireland), and for Lanesborough (1797–1800) (together with Richard Martin, known as 'Humanity Dick').

He served as Third Serjeant in 1793 and from 1795 to 1801, and was appointed Prime Serjeant 1801–02. He resigned as Serjeant in 1802. Although he blamed his political opponents for engineering his resignation, in fact, he resigned because of his massive debts, which made it impossible to show himself in Dublin, for fear of arrest. Possibly because of these debts he sold the family estates in Roscommon and moved to London. He later repaired his fortunes sufficiently to buy an estate in Pembrokeshire.

He was Commissioner of Appeals 1795–98, and became Commissioner of Accounts in 1802. He voted with the government against a proposal for an enquiry into the causes of the 1798 Rising, and (again with the Administration) in favour of the Act of Union 1800 in 1799 and 1800 which dissolved and abolished the Parliament of Ireland. In 1798 he was sent under a special commission to Cork to preside at the treason trials held there in the wake of the Rising. He was knighted in 1807.

== Judge ==
The court system in Prince of Wales Island became fully developed as a consequence of the 1807 Charter of Justice, whereby the British Crown established the right to a permanent Court of Judicature in the settlement of Penang. This was followed by the appointment of the first Supreme Court judge in 1807, designated as the 'Recorder', and Sir Edmond assumed office in 1808 as the First Recorder of the Supreme Court of Penang, where he is acknowledged as such and honoured to this day by the Penang Bar. At the same time, Sir Stamford Raffles, founder of Singapore, was the first registrar of the Supreme Court. (The designation 'Judge' was subsequently substituted for that of 'Recorder'.) The Supreme Court of Penang, which was first housed at Fort Cornwallis, was opened on 31 May 1808.

Stanley left Penang in December 1816 on being transferred to the Madras Presidency in the colonial British India in 1817 as puisne judge. He was subsequently appointed Chief Justice of the Madras Supreme Court (presently known as Madras High Court) on 17 May 1820 in succession to Sir John Henry Newbolt.

== Last years ==
He served until his resignation on 28 January 1825 when he retired to England. He was succeeded as Chief Justice by Sir Ralph Palmer. He died in Richmond, London, (previously Surrey), in 1843. He was buried alongside his wife in the catacombs of Kensal Green Cemetery. He left his property to his daughter Mrs Bontein, on condition that she and her sons take the name Stanley. She died in Brussels in 1881.
