= Samuel Ross Hay =

Samuel Ross Hay (1865 – 1944) was an American bishop of the Methodist Episcopal Church, South, elected in 1922.

Born 15 October 1865 in Decaturville, Decatur County, Tennessee, he was the son of the Rev. William and Martha (England) Hay. His grandfather was an influential local preacher.

The Hays moved to Texas about 1881. Samuel attended Centenary College, Southwestern University, and Southern College, Lakeland, Florida. He was licensed to preach in 1886, joining the North Texas Annual Conference of the M.E. Church, South in 1887. Prior to his election to the Episcopacy, Hay was a pastor and a presiding elder.

He was elected Bishop 16 May 1922 and placed in charge of all American Southern Methodist Episcopal Mission work in China. Returning to the United States in 1924, he resided in several episcopal areas in the south and west of the country and assisted in the development of the Methodist Church in Mexico.

On June 26, 1928, he offered the opening invocation at the 1928 Democratic National Convention in Houston.

Hay died on 4 February 1944 in Houston, Texas.

== Selected writings ==
- Address at funeral of Bishop McMurry. A brochure, 1934.

== See also ==
- List of bishops of the United Methodist Church
