= Augher (Parliament of Ireland constituency) =

Pre-1801 Irish constituency

Coordinates: 54.464°N 7.169°W

- Former borough constituency for the Irish House of Commons
- County: County Tyrone
- Borough: Augher

1614–1801
- Replaced by: Disfranchised

Augher was a constituency represented in the Irish House of Commons until the Acts of Union 1800 came into force on 1 January 1801.

== History ==
In the Patriot Parliament of 1689 summoned by James II, Augher was not represented.

== Members of Parliament, 1613–1801 ==
Election	First MP	Second MP
1613	Ralph Birchenshaw	Edward Skorye
1634	Robert Meredyth	Sir James Erskine
1639	Robert Byron	William Peasley, died and replaced in 1641 by Robert Martin
1661	Henry Mervyn	Richard Palfrey
1689	Augher was not represented in the Patriot Parliament	
1692	James Moutray	Archibald Richardson
1695	Sir Thomas Pakenham	David Creighton
1703	James Moutray	John Hamilton
1713	William Balfour	Henry Mervyn
1727	William Balfour	Richard Tighe
1737	William Balfour	William Richardson
1739	Richard Gorges	William Richardson
1755	Richard Gorges	St George Richardson
1761	William Montgomery	James Moutray
1768	Robert Rochfort	James Moutray
1776	George Hamilton	Sir William Fortick
October 1783	William Richardson (Note: Created a baronet in 1787)	Henry Vaughan Brooke (Note: Also elected for County Donegal in 1783, for which he chose to sit)
1783	William Richardson	Samuel Hayes (Note: Created a baronet in 1789)
1790	Thomas Coghlan	Edmond Stanley
1794	John Stewart (Note: Also elected for Bangor in 1797, for which he chose to sit)	Edmond Stanley
1798	William Bailey	James Galbraith
1801	Disenfranchised	

== Bibliography ==
- O'Hart, John (2007). The Irish and Anglo-Irish Landed Gentry: When Cromwell came to Ireland. Vol. II. Heritage Books. ISBN 0-7884-1927-7.
- Leigh Rayment's historical List of Members of the Irish House of Commons. Cites: Johnston-Liik, Edith Mary (2002). The History of the Irish Parliament 1692-1800 (6 volumes). Ulster Historical Foundation.
