= Drumboe Castle =

Ruined fortification in County Donegal, Ireland

Coordinates: 54.801490°N 7.789092°W

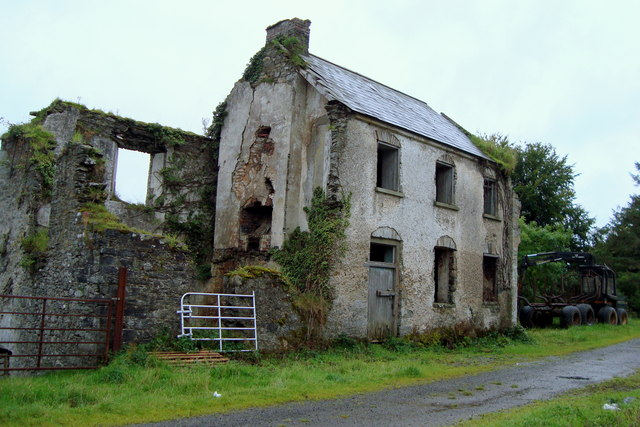
Ruins of Drumboe Castle

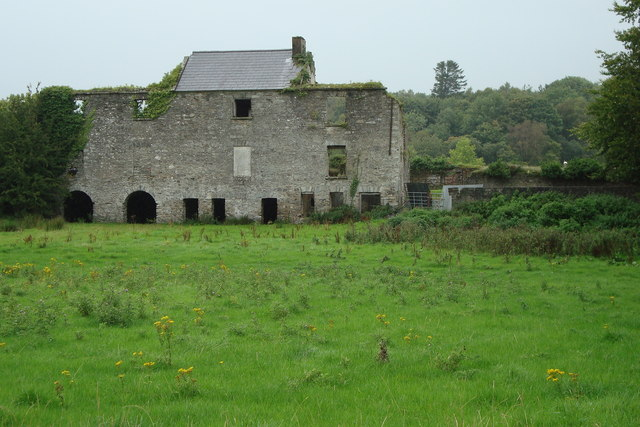
Back of the stable block at the site of Drumboe Castle

Drumboe Castle was located on the outskirts of the town of Stranorlar in County Donegal, Ireland.

== Early history ==
In 1622, during the Plantation of Ulster, Robert Redington sold the estate at Ballybofey to Sir Ralph Bingley. Bingley erected the original Drumboe Castle, which had four large towers. Its location protected a ford across the River Finn.

After the death of Sir Ralph Bingley, his widow Lady Jane and Robert Harrington took charge until 1641, when it was granted to Sir William Bazil, Attorney-General for Ireland. He died in 1693.

A descendant of Sir William Bazil was William Basil, who was born William Ball and changed name to Basil by a private act of Parliament, Ball's Name Act 1724 (11 Geo. 1. c. 2 Pr.). Basil married Frances Dowdeswell around 1736. Their daughter Mary Basil married Sir Samuel Hayes, 1st Baronet, and through this marriage it became the home of the Hayes baronets, of Drumboe Castle, from 1789 to 1912.

== Irish Civil War ==
It became the General Headquarters for the forces of the Irish Free State in County Donegal during the Irish Civil War.

It is infamous for being the location of the Drumboe massacre during the Irish Civil War. On 14 March 1923, four anti-Treaty IRA fighters, Charles Daly (26), Sean Larkin (26), Daniel Enwright (23), and Timothy O' Sullivan (23), who had been captured and held in the castle since January, were summarily shot in retaliation for the death of a National Army soldier in an ambush.

== Demolition ==
The Georgian house was demolished in 1945.
