= Hayes baronets =

Set index for Hayes baronets

There have been two baronetcies created for persons with the surname Hayes, one in the Baronetage of Ireland and one in the Baronetage of Great Britain. Both creations are extinct.

- Hayes baronets of Drumboe Castle (1789)
- Hayes baronets of Westminster (1797)
