= Larmanjat guided rail system =

Hybrid road-rail system

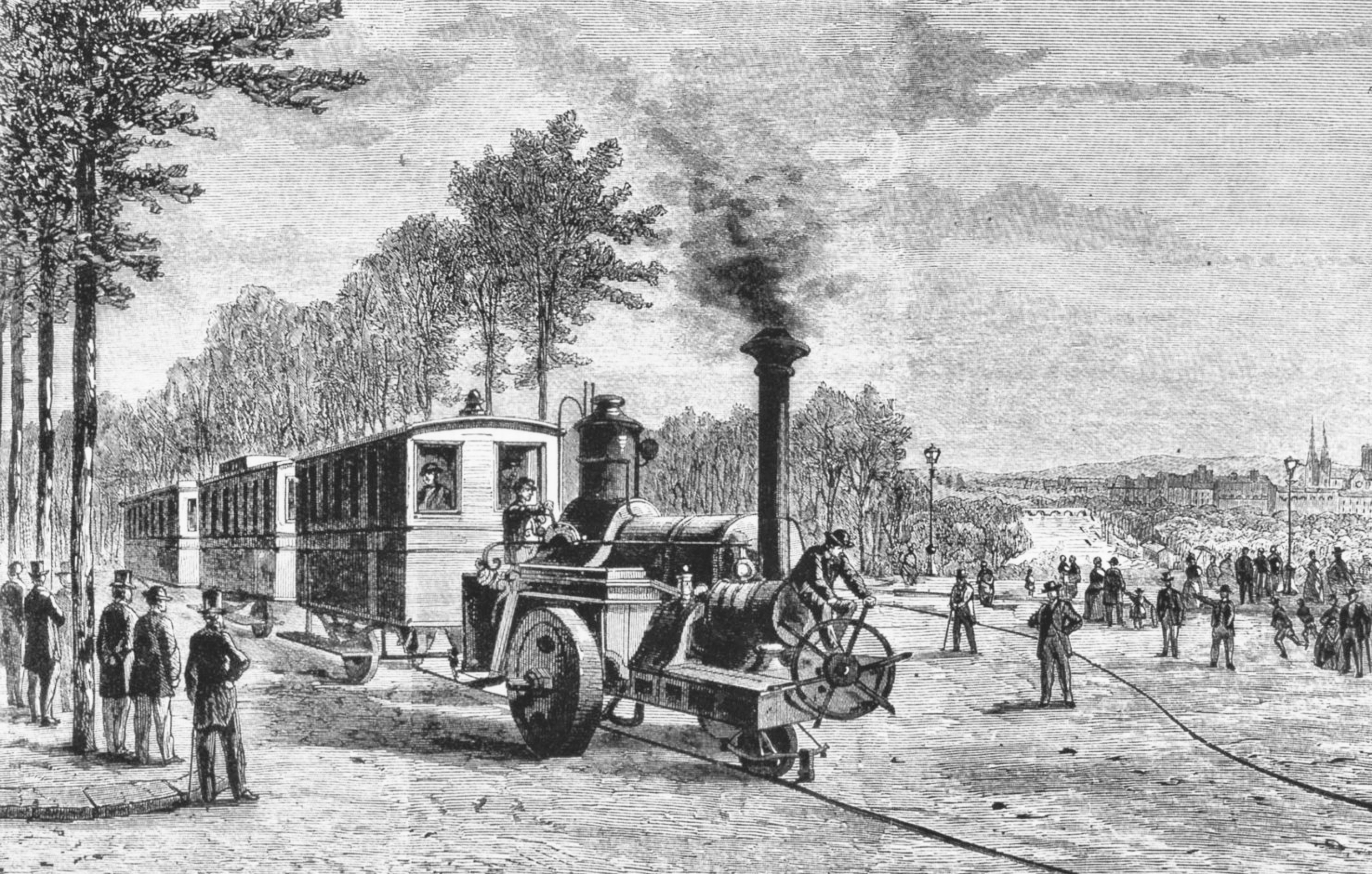
Demonstration train at Paris, 1867. The spoked wheel at the front was used to vary the weight distribution between the road and rail wheels.

The Larmanjat guided rail system was a 19th-century French hybrid road-and-rail system. It sought to combine the benefits of the low friction of metal wheels running on a single metal rail with the improved tractive effort offered by wide side-wheels running on the road surface—only the side wheels were driven. Engineer Jean Larmanjat presented the apparatus at the 1867 Universal Exhibition in Paris and in August 1868 he opened a 5-kilometre (3-mile) demonstration line between Raincy and Montfermeil, Seine et Oise, to the east of Paris. The success of this line gained the attention of Portuguese diplomat the Duke of Saldanha for the construction of lines around Lisbon. He formed a company in London to build lines between Lisbon and Cintra and Lisbon and Torres Vedras, but these were not successful and the company was declared bankrupt in 1875. In 1873 Larmanjat was authorised to install his track on a length of towpath on the Canal de Bourgogne to haul heavy barges. He did not complete the project.

== Demonstration at the Universal Exhibition ==
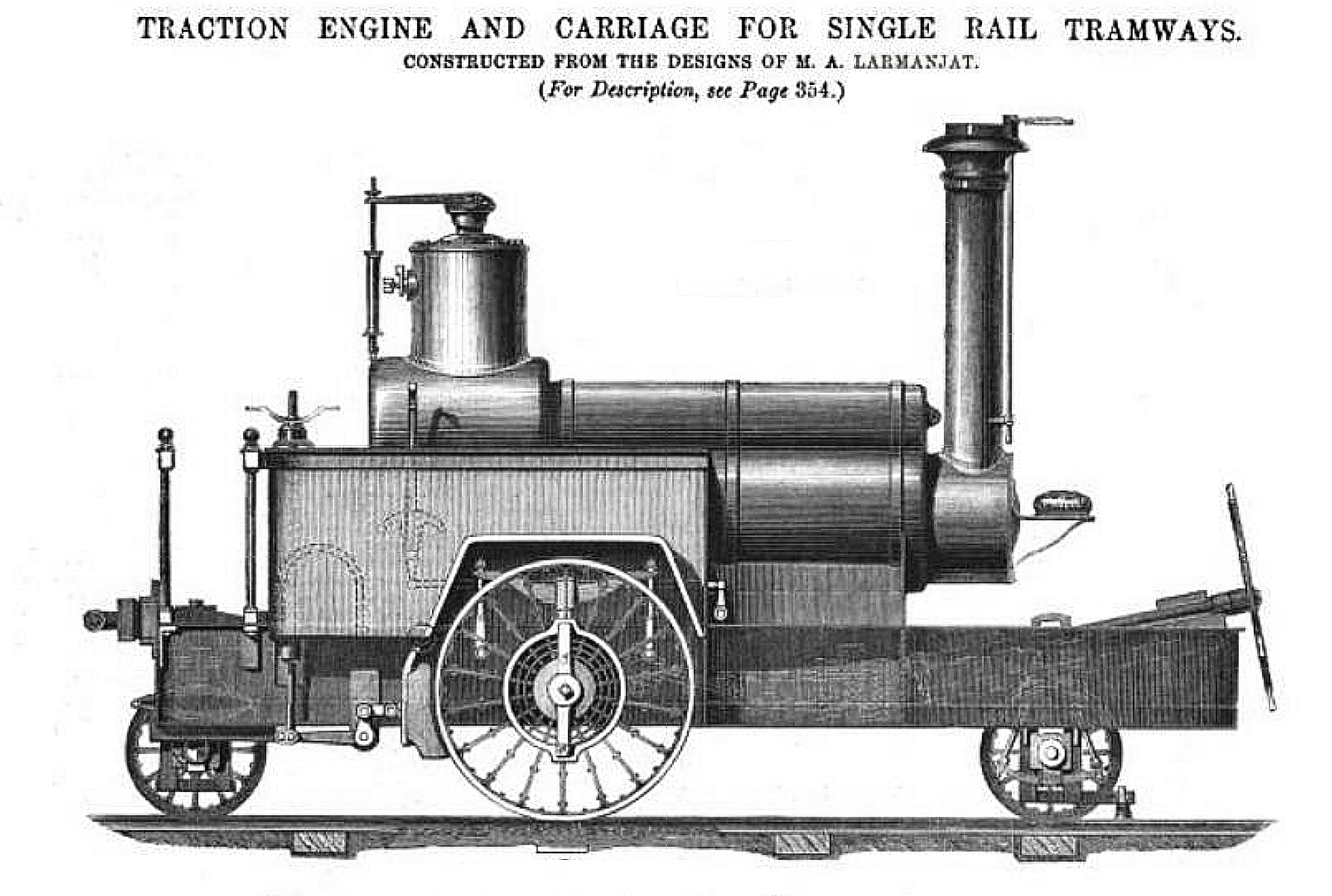
The "locomobile"

The locomotive Larmanjat demonstrated at the Paris exhibition of 1867 (the "locomobile") had two pivoting, double-flanged, metal wheels mounted in line and carrying most of the locomotive's weight on the single rail. Two larger wheels, one on each side and in contact with the road surface, were mounted on a central cross-axle. The cross-axle was driven through spiral bevel gear reduction and the wheels were a loose fit on the axle to allow for different rotational speeds, so easing the negotiation of turns. Drive was transmitted only when coil springs mounted in the hubs were sufficiently wound up. Whereas in normal running most of the weight fell onto the rail, when extra traction was required the locomotive was tilted by a screw mechanism moving a linear-motion slide, operated from a position on the front of the vehicle; this brought extra weight to bear onto the road wheels. On the carriages, to reduce friction all the weight was carried by the central wheels; the side wheels served only to keep the vehicles upright.

== Raincy and Montfermeil line ==
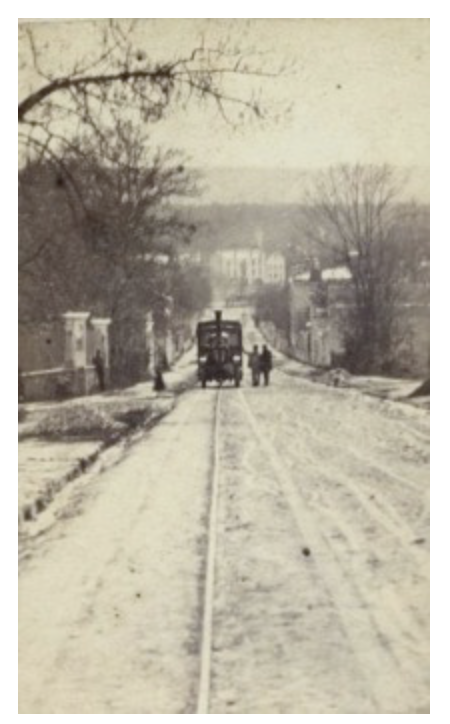
On the public roadway between Raincy and Montfermeil

Consequent on the success of the Paris trial, in August 1868 Larmanjat opened a 5-kilometre (3-mile) line along the existing public road between Raincy and Montfermeil, east of Paris, to demonstrate how a cheaply laid track would be sufficient where only light traffic was expected. The locomotive was again supported on a single rail, with the driving wheels and the side wheels of the carriages running on the ordinary surface of the road. On the opening day the journey from Raincy to Montfermeil (the uphill direction with a maximum gradient of 1 in 14, 7%) took 20 minutes and the return journey, with firm application of the brakes, 17. A turning curve with a radius of 5 metres (16 ft) was provided at the west end of the line, with points and a turning triangle at the east. The line was destroyed in 1870 after Raincy was the location of a heavy artillery engagement during the Franco-Prussian War.

== Lisbon steam tramways ==
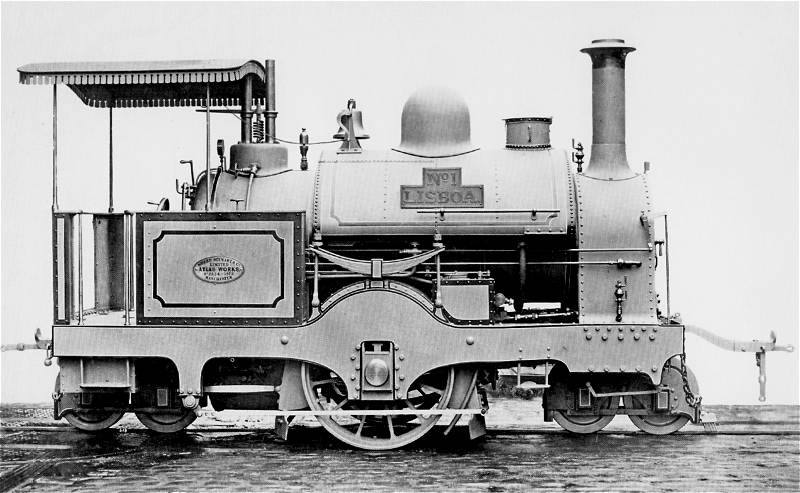
Sharp Stewart guided rail locomotive Lisboa for Lisbon Steam Tramways

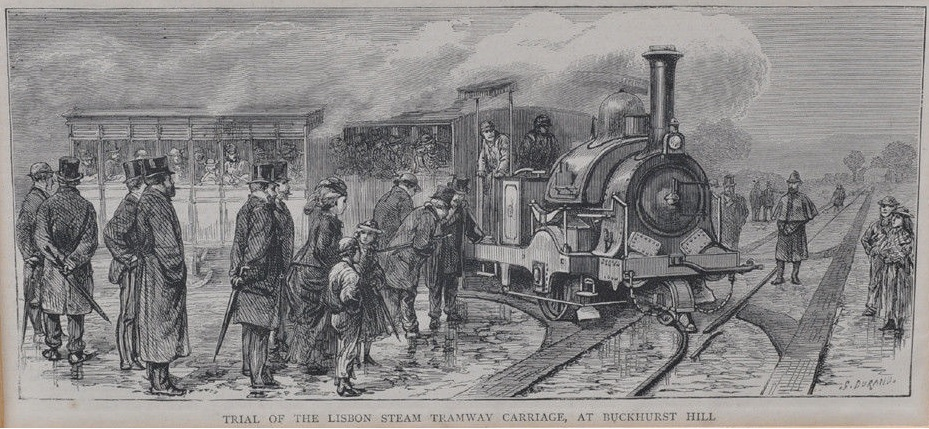
Trial at Buckhurst Hill, Essex, 1872

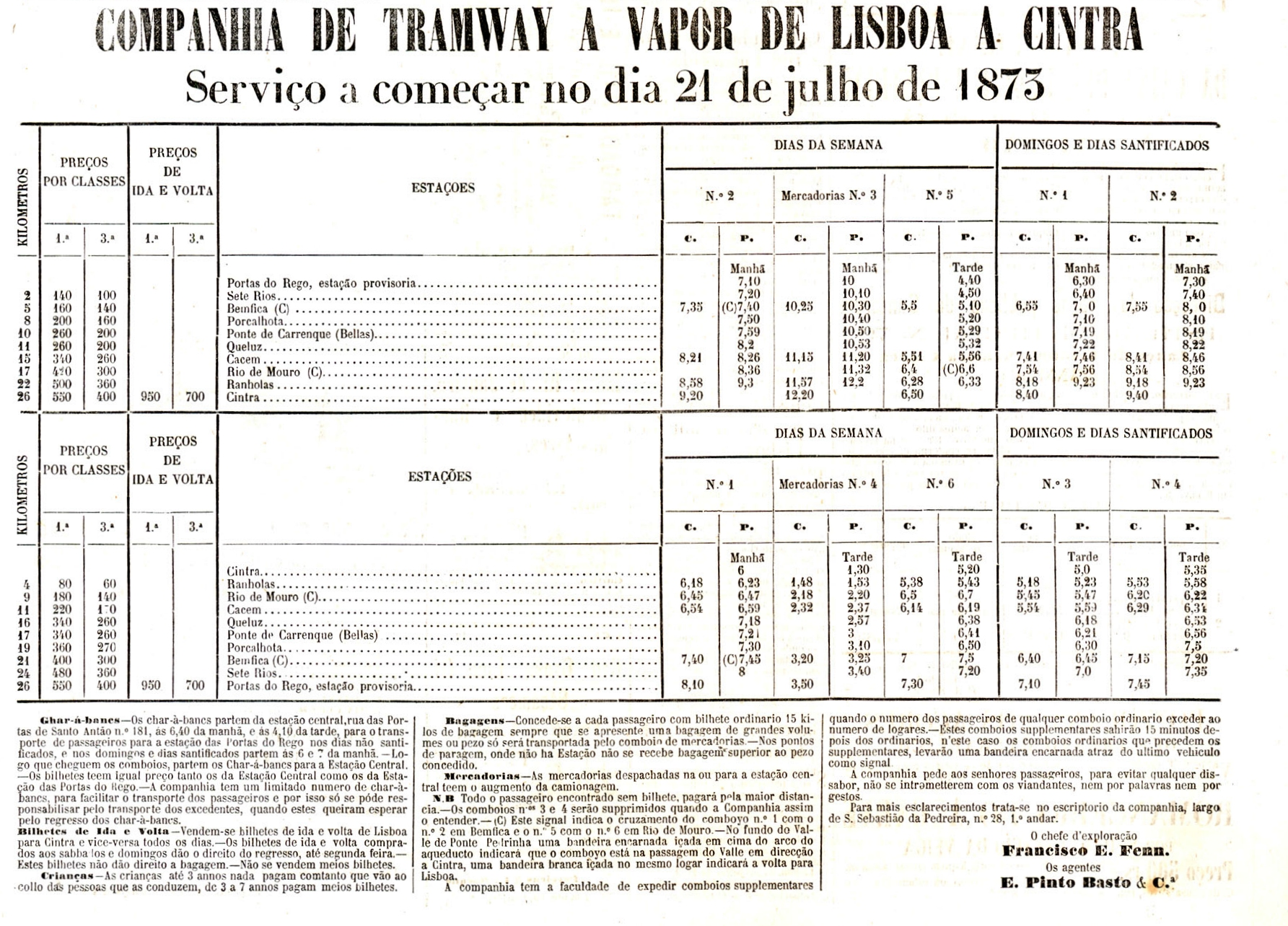
Lisbon—Cintra timetable July 1873

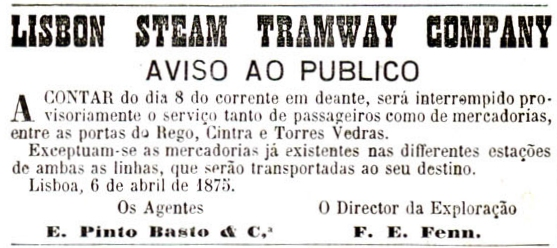
Notice of suspension of service, April 1875

In March 1869, the Duke of Saldanha, Portuguese ambassador in Paris, inspected the Raincy-Montfermeil project and was persuaded of its capabilities. He built, largely at his own expense, a 5-kilometre (3-mile) Larmanjat line between Lisbon and Lumiar. This was inaugurated on 31 January 1870.

To complete the Lisbon project of 100 kilometres (63 miles) of line to Torres Vedras and Cintra, more capital was needed, so Saldanha set up the Lisbon Steam Tramways Company Ltd. in London in July 1871, with share capital of £200,000 (equivalent to £25,000,000 in 2024). Edwin Clark, Punchard and Company of London, an international civil engineering firm, was engaged to build and run the line, accepting shares in the new company as part payment. Francis Trevithick was appointed as chief engineer. Trevithick commissioned Sharp Stewart of Manchester to build a Larmanjat locomotive to his design, incorporating a new hydraulic mechanism to adjust the locomotive's weight distribution from within the cab, replacing the original screw mechanism. He specified that the roadway was to be supplemented by wooden planks to carry the driving wheels.

Sharp Stewart delivered the first locomotive to Buckhurst Hill, Essex, in December 1872, where a length of demonstration track had been laid. Public trials were held (with rolling stock supplied by Brown and Marshalls of Birmingham) over two days in January 1873. Performance was satisfactory on the first day, when the weather was dry, but on the second day rain made the wooden planks slippery and the driving wheels were unable to maintain sufficient traction. Nonetheless, Clark, Punchard were authorised to continue construction in Lisbon.

The line to Cintra was completed by February 1873 and to Torres Vedras in May. In the conditions experienced in Portugal, Trevithick's engines and track were not successful: derailments occurred from stones obstructing the planks or the rail; in wet weather the locomotives struggled for traction on the warped and slippery planks; in dry weather gritty dust overwhelmed the passengers and entered the working parts of the locomotives, causing frequent breakdowns.

After 22 months in operation, always running at a loss, the Lisbon Steam Tramways Company was deemed to have "completely failed in [its] undertaking", and on 16 July 1875 it was made the subject of a winding up order in the Chancery Division of the High Court in London.

Punchard and Clark, the contractors appointed by the promoting company, were the subject of legal proceedings alleging fraud—it was claimed that they had employed financier Albert Grant dishonestly to "ramp" the price of their shares in the tramway company. It was stated in court that Grant had bribed financial journalists to report favourably on the investment, with the finance editor of The Times, Marmaduke Sampson, receiving £275 and David Morier Evans of the Evening Standard £50. The plaintiff (a dissatisfied shareholder) was awarded the purchase price of his shares.

== Other proposed lines ==
In September 1869, citing the success of the Raincy-Montfermeil line, Larmanjat applied for authorisation to build a line along departmental road 3 from Joigny to Toucy, Department de L'Yonne, France. Public consultation was ordered and in April 1874 (by which time the indifferent performance of the Larmanjat tramways at Lisbon had become evident) permission was refused.

Larmanjat secured authorisation to build a 15-kilometre (9-mile) line on public roadways from Lausanne to Échallens, canton of Vaud, Switzerland, in June 1872. The promoting company, Compagnie du chemin de fer de Lausanne à Echallens, sent an engineer to witness the Raincy trial and he reported unfavourably: He found that the locomotive had a tendency to leave the track and wander to the left and right "like a wheelbarrow (une brouette)". Instead, the existing roadway was widened to accommodate conventional metre-gauge track, but the nickname "La Brouette" continued in use long after the new line was opened.

== Canal de Bourgogne ==
In January 1873 Larmanjet secured a 40-year concession for towpath haulage of barges between Roche and St-Jean-de-Losne on the Canal de Bourgogne, a distance of 240 kilometres (150 miles). He reasoned that the centre rail would resist any tendency for the boats to pull the locomotives sideways into the water, and that fragile canal banks would bear the weight of his small engines better than that of highway traction engines. The system was tested in July 1873 but after three years of delay it was abandoned.

== See also ==
- Addis's Single Rail Tramway
- Caillet monorail
- Ewing system
- Patiala State Monorail Trainways
- Rubber-tyred tram
- Gadgetbahn
