= Mary Hamilton, Duchess of Abercorn =

English aristocrat

The Duchess of Abercorn
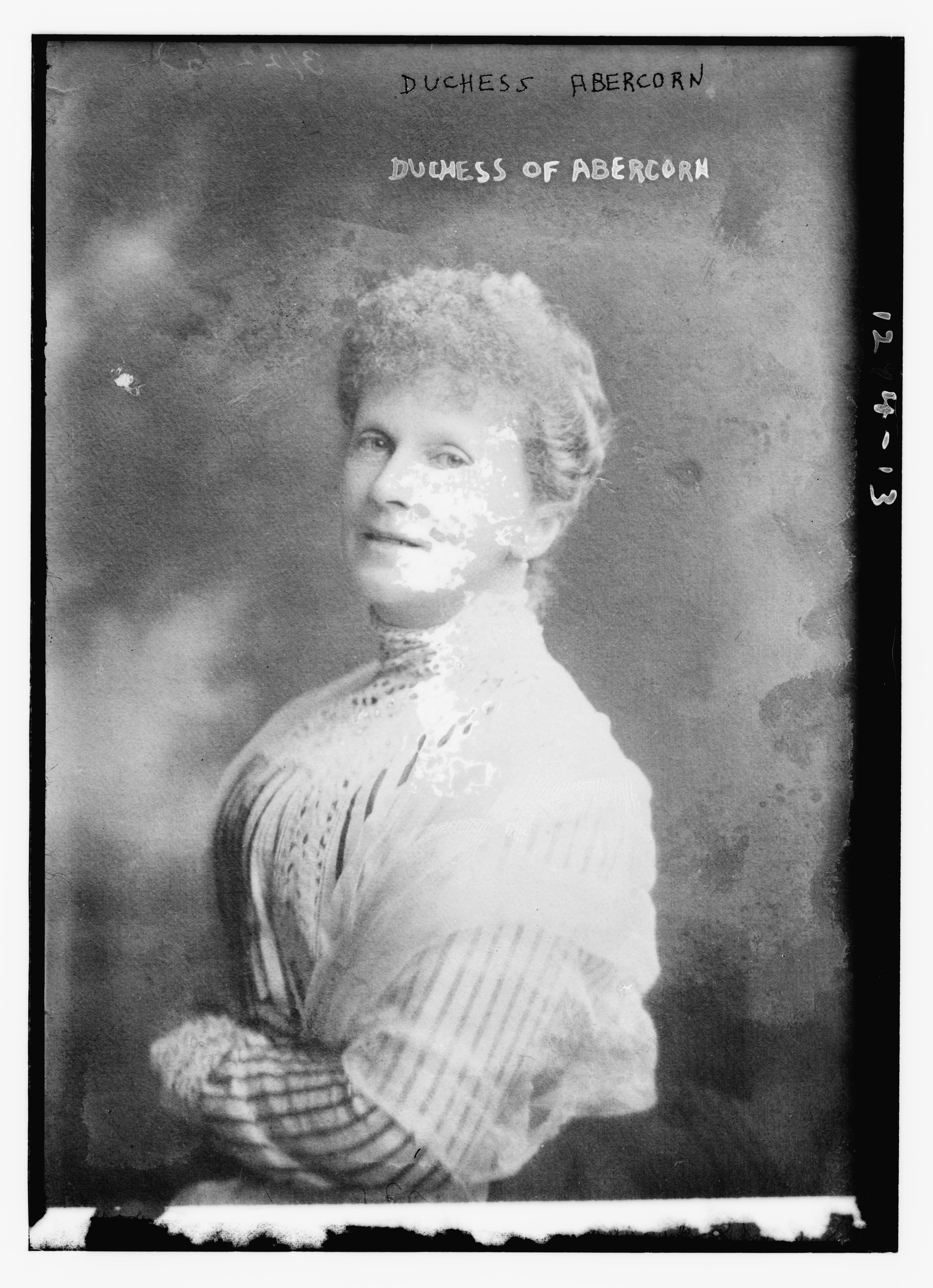
- Born: Mary Anna Curzon-Howe; 23 July 1848; Gopsall, Leicestershire, England
- Died: 10 May 1929 (aged 80); London, England
- Spouse: James Hamilton, 2nd Duke of Abercorn (m. 1869; died 1913)
- Issue: James Hamilton, 3rd Duke of Abercorn; Lady Alexandra Phyllis Hamilton; Gladys, Countess of Wicklow; Lord Arthur John Hamilton; Lord Claud Nigel Hamilton
- Father: Richard Curzon-Howe, 1st Earl Howe
- Mother: Anne Gore

Mary Anna Hamilton, Duchess of Abercorn (née Curzon-Howe; 23 July 1848 – 10 May 1929), was an English courtier and aristocrat. She served as Lady-in-Waiting to Queen Alexandra.

== Life ==
Lady Mary was born at Gopsall Hall in Leicestershire, the daughter of Richard Curzon-Howe, 1st Earl Howe, and his second wife, Anne Gore, daughter of Admiral Sir John Gore. She had two full brothers, Montagu Curzon and Admiral Sir Assheton Curzon-Howe, and 10 half-siblings by her father's first marriage.

The Duchess held the office of Lady-in-Waiting to Alexandra, Princess of Wales.

She suffered a fall and broke her arm in January 1929. She died a few months later at her residence at 115 Park Street, Mayfair.

== Marriage and issue ==
Lady Mary married James Hamilton, Marquess of Hamilton, eldest son of James Hamilton, 1st Duke of Abercorn, and Lady Louisa Jane Russel on 7 January 1869 at St. George's Church, St. George Street, Hanover Square, London, England.

They had seven sons and two daughters. A son and daughter were killed during the First World War.

- James Albert Edward Hamilton, 3rd Duke of Abercorn (1869–1953)
- Lord Claud Penn Alexander Hamilton (1871–1871, on the same day)
- Lord Charlie Hamilton (1874–1874, on the same day)
- Lady Alexandra Phyllis Hamilton (1876–1918), who had The Princess of Wales as sponsor at her baptism; she was lost at sea when the RMS Leinster was torpedoed. She died unmarried.
- Lord Claud Francis Hamilton (1878–1878, on the same day)
- Lady Gladys Mary Hamilton (1880–1917), who in 1902 married Ralph Howard, 7th Earl of Wicklow (1877–1946). She was his first wife; and they had one son.
- Lord Arthur John Hamilton (1883–1914), who was Deputy Master of the Household from 1913, Captain in the Irish Guards and was killed in action at the First Battle of Ypres.
- Lord unnamed Hamilton (1886–1886, on the same day)
- Lord Claud Nigel Hamilton (1889–1975), Captain in the Grenadier Guards, fought in the First World War and served in the household of King George V, his widow and Queen Elizabeth II as Deputy Master of the Household, as Extra Equerry, as Equerry in Ordinary and as Comptroller, Treasurer and Extra Equerry. In 1933 he married Violet Ruby Ashton. They had no issue.
