= High Sheriff of Donegal =

The High Sheriff of Donegal was the British Crown's judicial representative in County Donegal in Ulster, Ireland, from the late 16th century until 1922, when the office was abolished in the new Irish Free State and replaced by the office of Donegal County Sheriff. The High Sheriff had judicial, electoral, ceremonial and administrative functions and executed High Court Writs. In 1908, an Order in Council made the Lord-Lieutenant the Sovereign's prime representative in a county and reduced the High Sheriff's precedence. However, the sheriff retained his responsibilities for the preservation of law and order in the county. The usual procedure for appointing the sheriff from 1660 onwards was that three persons were nominated at the beginning of each year from the county and the Lord Lieutenant then appointed his choice as High Sheriff for the remainder of the year. Often the other nominees were appointed as under-sheriffs. Sometimes a sheriff did not fulfil his entire term through death or other event and another sheriff was then appointed for the remainder of the year. The dates given hereunder are the dates of appointment. All addresses are in County Donegal unless stated otherwise.

County Donegal was created in 1607.

== High Sheriffs of County Donegal ==
- 1633: William Farrar
- 1640: Henry Vaughan
- 1664: Thomas Grove of Castle Shanahan
- 1669: John Nesbitt
- 1682: Paul Benson
- 1686: John Forward
- 1686: Lancelot Carleton
- 1687: Charles Hamilton of Cavanough
- 1694: Sir Francis Hamilton, 3rd Baronet of Killock in the County of Down.
- 1697: William Stewart, of Fort Stewart

== 18th century ==
- 1707: Charles Stewart of Horn Head House
- 1715: Humphrey Wray of Ards
- 1720: Wybrants Olphert of Ballyness
- 1722: William Babington
- 1724: Thomas Grove of Castle Shanaghan
- 1725: James Nesbitt of Tullydonnell
- 1727: William Grove of Castle Grove
- 1731: John Galbraith
- 1732:
- 1735: James Nesbitt of Boyle
- 1736:
- 1737: James Grove of Grovehall
- 1738: William Stewart of Killymoon and Ballymenagh
- 1739: James Hamilton of Carlow
- 1740: John Boyd of Letterkenny
- 1742: Frederick Stewart of Horn Head House
- 1743:
- 1747: John Olphert of Ballyconnell
- 1750: Gustavus Hamilton Stewart of Ray
- 1751:
- 1754: John Harvey of Malin Hall
- 1755: Sir Ralph Gore, 6th Bt. (later created 1st Earl of Ross)
- 1756 Andrew Knox, MP for Donegal
- 1757: Henry Hamilton (from 1775 Sir Henry Hamilton, 1st Baronet of Manor Cunningham)
- 1758: William Maxwell
- 1759: Hodgson Gage
- 1760: George Carey of Redcastle
- 1761: Richard Bateson
- 1762: John McCausland MP for Donegal
- 1763: Daniel Chambers
- 1764: Captain Robert McClintock of Dunmore House, Carrigans
- 1765: Anthony Thompson
- 1766: George Young of Culdaff
- 1767: John Hamilton
- 1768: Charles Stewart of Horn Head House
- 1769: James McClintock
- 1770: George Brooke
- 1771: George Nesbitt of Woodhill
- 1772: John Boyd of Ballymacool House
- 1773: Colonel Alexander Montgomery
- 1774: Richard Bateson
- 1775: George Carey
- 1776: William Knox of Kilcaddan
- 1777: Thomas Young (Senior)
- 1778: Henry Irwine
- 1779: Henry Major
- 1780: Thomas Nesbitt of KilMacredan
- 1781: Laurence O'Hara of Brookfield
- 1782: Richard Charleton of Birdstown
- 1783: Charles Nesbit
- 1784: William Mortimer of Rathmelton
- 1785: John Lamy of Raphoe
- 1786: Henry Vaughan Brooke of Brooke Hill
- 1788: Francis Mansfield
- 1789: Wybrants Olphert of Ballyness
- 1790:
- 1791: Alexander Stewart of Ards, Letterkenny
- 1799: Sir James Stewart, 7th Baronet

== 19th century ==
- 1800: John Atkinson.
- 1800: Andrew Hamilton of Ballymadonnell.
- 1804: Robert Harvey.
- 1805: William Stewart of Horn Head House.
- 1806: John Boyd.
- 1807: James C. Nesbitt.
- 1808: William Stewart.
- 1809: Alexander Boyd.
- 1810: John McDonnell.
- 1811: Andrew Ferguson.
- 1812: William Law.
- 1813: Henry Brooke.
- 1814: Arthur Chichester of Greencastle.
- 1815: Hon. James Hewett.
- 1816: Henry Irwin.
- 1817: Thomas John Atkinson of Cavangarden, Ballyshannon.
- 1818: Sir Robert Alexander Ferguson
- 1819: Robert Montgomery.
- 1820: James Stewart of Brown Hall and St Ernan's and Edmond Packenham.
- 1821: Hon. Francis Howard.
- 1822: Sir Robert Bateson, 2nd Bt.
- 1824: George Knox, of Prehen House, Derry
- 1825: Sir Charles Style, of Cloghar-lodge.
- 1827: Connolly Gage, of Castle Finn.
- 1828: John Hart, of Kilderry, Derry
- 1829:
- 1830: Sir Edmund Samuel Hayes, 3rd Baronet of Drumboe Castle
- 1831: Alexander Robert Stewart of Ards House, Creeslough.
- 1832: Sir James Stewart, 8th Baronet of Fort Stewart. Ramelton.
- 1834: John Creighton, of Lifford.
- 1834: Thomas Brooke of Manor Brooke and Lough Eske.
- 1835: Robert McClintock of Dunmore House, Carrigans.
- 1836: John Harvey of Malin Hall.
- 1837:
- 1838: John Vandeleur Stewart of Rock Hill.
- 1840: John Robert Boyd of Dunduan House.
- 1841: The Hon. James Hewitt (became The 4th Viscount Lifford in 1855) of Meenglass House, Stranorlar.
- 1842: Wybrants Olphert of Ballycommell.
- 1844: Thomas Batt of Rathmullan.
- 1845: Lord George Hill of Ballygar.
- 1846: John Robert Boyd of Ballymacool.
- 1848: Thomas Conolly.
- 1848: Benjamin Geale Humfrey of Cavanacor.
- 1849: James Hamilton of Brown Hall and St Ernan's, Donegal Town
- 1850: Francis Stewart Mansfield of Castle Wray.
- 1850: John Fergusen of Castle Forward, Derry.
- 1852: Thomas Alexander of Buncrana.
- 1853: Alexander John Robert Stewart of Ards House, Dunfanaghy.
- 1854: William Sinclair of Holyhill.
- 1855: James Grove of Castle Grove.
- 1856: William Henry Marsham Style of Glenmore, Stranorlar
- 1858: Horatio Granville Murray-Stewart of Broughton.
- 1858: Benjamin Geale Humfrey of Cavanacor. (also Sheriffs of City of Derry)
- 1860: James Thompson Macky of Belmont, Derry.
- 1861: William John Forster of Derry.
- 1862: George Knox of Prehen House.
- 1863: Viscount Sudley.
- 1864: Thomas Norman of Glengollan.
- 1865:
- 1867: The 4th Earl Erne, of Crom Castle
- 1867: James Henry Todd-Thornton of Westbrook.
- 1868: Horatio Granville Murray-Stewart of Cally, Gatehouse.
- 1868: John Keys Humfrey of Cavanacor.
- 1870: George Miller Harvey of Malin Hall.
- 1871: Charles Frederick Stewart of Horn Head.
- William Wray
- 1873: John George Adair of Glenveagh Castle
- 1874: James Bogle Delap of Monellan.
- 1875: John Stouppe Charley.
- 1877: Captain Baptist Johnston Barton.
- 1878: Robert McClintock of Dunmore House, Carrigans.
- 1879: Ernest Grey Lambton Cochrane of Red Castle.
- 1881: Alexander Charles Hector Stewart.
- 1882: William Edward Hart of Kilderry, County Londonderry.
- 1884–87: Sir Samuel Hercules Hayes, 4th Baronet of Drumboe Castle
- 1886: Robert Lyon Moore of Molenan.
- 1887: Thomas Butler Stoney of Oakfield House, Raphoe.
- 1888: Francis Coffin Macky of Belmont, County Londonderry.
- 1889:
- 1890: Captain William Knox of Clonleigh
- 1891: Henry Stubbs of Danby.
- 1892: William Henry Boyd of Ballymacool House.
- 1893: Thomas John Atkinson of Cavangarden, Ballyshannon.
- 1894: Robert Crawford of Stonewold, Ballyshannon.
- 1895: Henry Chichester Hart of Carrablagh House.
- 1896: William Knox of Clonleigh.
- 1897:
- 1898: John Stewart Hamilton of Browns Hall, Donegal.
- 1899: James Montgomery Sinclair of Holyhill and Bonneyglen, Inver. (suicide 1899)
- 1899–1900: John Herdman of Sion House.

== 20th century ==
- 1901: James Boughey Monk Lingard-Monk, Dunlewy House, Dunlewy, Gaoth Dobhair.
- 1902: John Conyngham McClintock of Tiernaleague House, Carndonagh.
- 1903: Colonel William McClintock of Dunmore House.
- 1904:
- 1905: Sir Harry Jocelyn Uruquhart Stewart, 11th Baronet of Fort Stewart, Ramelton.
- 1906: Edmund Christopher Stewart of Ardrummon House.
- 1907: Sir Arthur Robert Wallace of Ardnamona.
- 1908: Richard Francis Ernest Cochrane.
- 1909: Henry Musgrave.
- 1910: Charles Norman of Glengollan.
- 1911: Fisher Henry Freke Evans of Churchlands.
- 1912: Henry Herbert Ronald White of Lough Eske.
- 1914: George Lawrence Young of Culdaff House, Culdaff.

== Sources ==
- Empey, Mark, ed. (2015). Early Stuart Irish warrants, 1623–1639: the Falkland and Wentworth administrations. Dublin: Irish Manuscript Commission. ISBN 9781906865566.
