= James Hamilton, 2nd Duke of Abercorn =

British nobleman, courtier, and diplomat

His Grace The Duke of Abercorn KG CB PC (Ire)
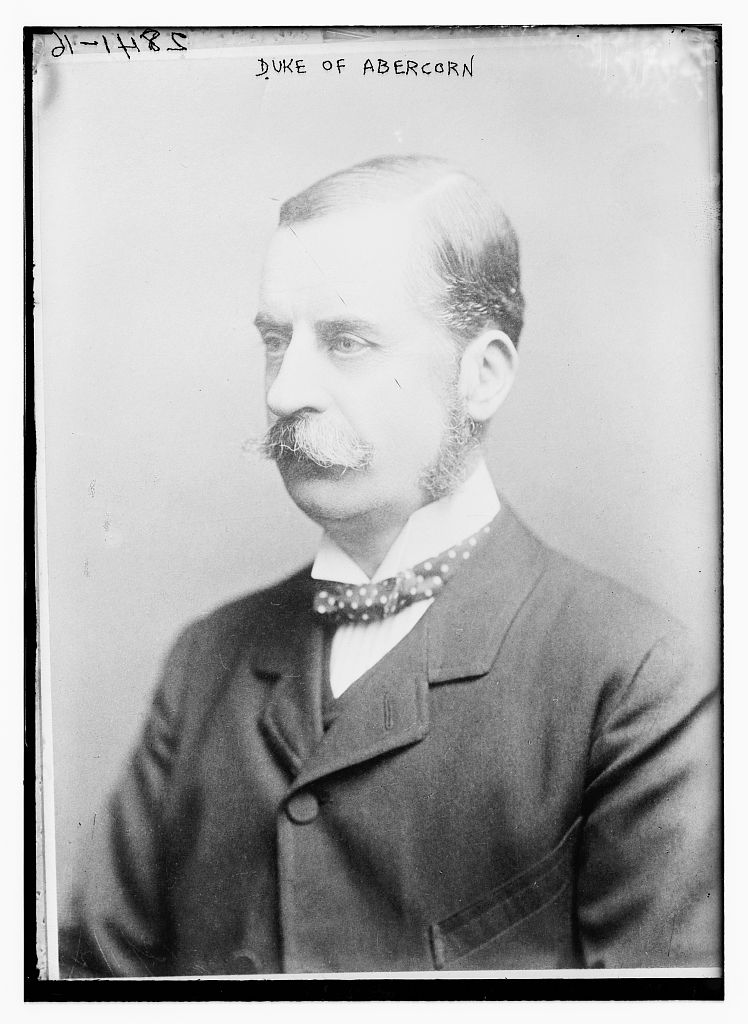
- James Hamilton, 2nd Duke of Abercorn, c. 1913
- Born: 24 August 1838; Brighton, Sussex
- Died: 3 June 1913 (aged 74); Mayfair, London
- Noble family: Hamilton
- Spouse: Lady Mary Anna Curzon-Howe (m. 1869)
- Issue: James Albert Edward Hamilton, 3rd Duke of Abercorn; Lady Alexandra Phyllis Hamilton; Lady Gladys Mary Hamilton; Lord Arthur John Hamilton; Lord Claud Nigel Hamilton
- Father: James Hamilton, 1st Duke of Abercorn
- Mother: Lady Louisa Jane Russell

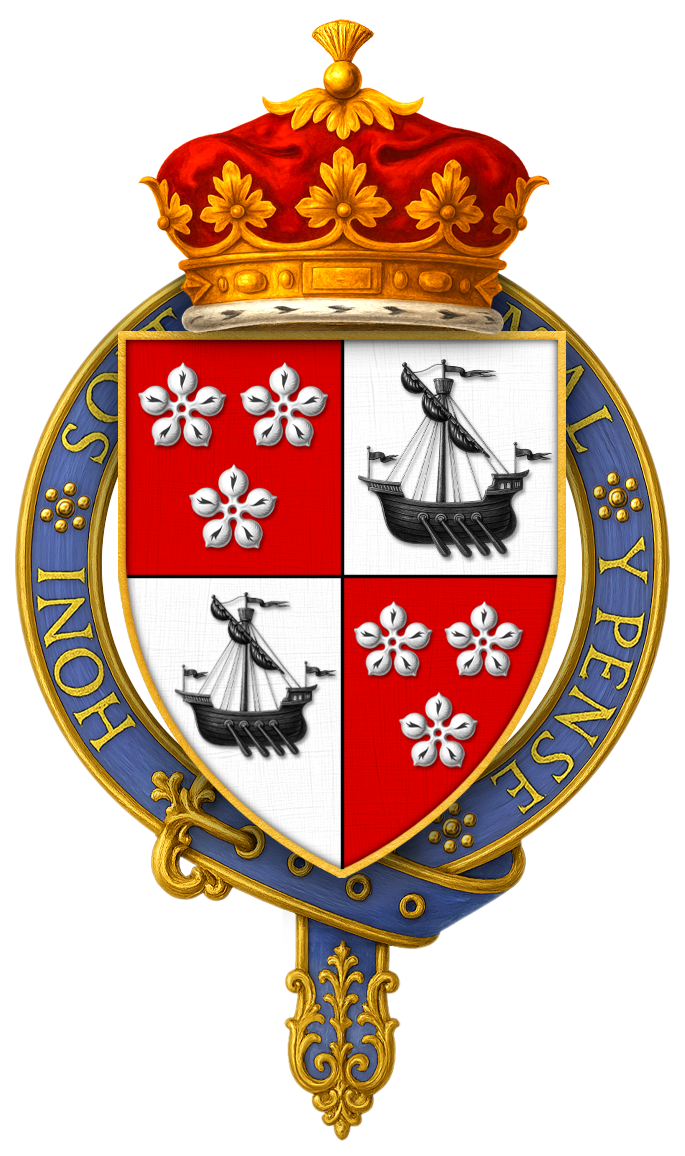
Garter-encircled shield of arms of James Hamilton, 2nd Duke of Abercorn, KG, CB, PC

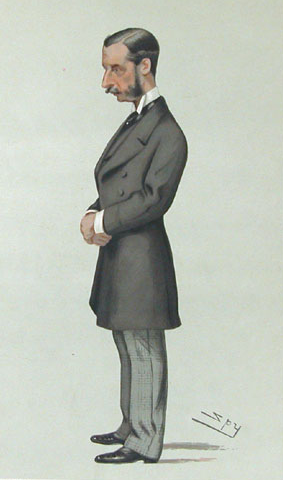
The duke as Marquess of Hamilton by Leslie Ward, 1881

James Hamilton, 2nd Duke of Abercorn (24 August 1838 – 3 June 1913), styled Viscount Hamilton until 1868 and Marquess of Hamilton from 1868 to 1885, was a British nobleman, courtier, and diplomat. He was the son of James Hamilton, 1st Duke of Abercorn, and Lady Louisa Jane Russell.

== Early life ==
Lord Hamilton was born in 1838 at Brighton, the eldest son of James Hamilton, 2nd Marquess and later 1st Duke of Abercorn (1811–1885), and his wife Lady Louisa Jane Russell (1812–1905), second daughter of John Russell, 6th Duke of Bedford.

He was educated, like his father, at Harrow and Christ Church, Oxford, where he matriculated on 28 May 1857.

== Career ==
After graduating from Oxford with a BA in 1860, he entered Parliament as Conservative MP for County Donegal, a constituency he represented from 1860 to 1880. He took over from his father as Honorary Colonel of the Prince of Wales's Own Donegal Militia on 22 September 1860, and retained the position until 1891 when his brother Lord Claud Hamilton (who had been commandant of the regiment) took over. After serving as High Sheriff of Tyrone for 1863, Viscount Hamilton re-entered university and emerged with an M.A. in 1865 (he was created a Companion of the Order of the Bath the same year). That year, he also embarked upon a diplomatic mission to Denmark. He served as a Lord of the Bedchamber to the Prince of Wales from 1866 to 1885; in the latter year, he took over his father's position of Lord Lieutenant of County Donegal, and inherited his father's peerage titles. He led the Lords' reply to the Speech from the throne wearing the uniform of Lord Lieutenant of Donegal on 21 January 1886. He was chosen Grand Master of the Grand Lodge of Ireland in 1886, a post he held until his death. In 1887 he was appointed to the Privy Council of Ireland.

Abercorn held several positions after acceding to that title, including Groom of the Stole to the Prince of Wales (1886–1891), and chairman of the British South Africa Company. In early 1901 he was appointed by King Edward to lead a special diplomatic mission to announce the King's accession to the governments of Denmark, Sweden and Norway, Russia, Germany and Saxony.

He was created a Knight of the Garter. He died of pneumonia at his house at 61 Green Street, Mayfair, at the age of 74. He is buried in the cemetery at Baronscourt Parish Church, the traditional burial place of the Dukes of Abercorn and their families.

In 1883, he held 76,500 acres in Tyrone and Donegal. He also held 2,100 acres in Scotland.

== Personal life ==
In 1869 he married Lady Mary Anna Curzon-Howe (1848–1929), a daughter of Richard Curzon-Howe, 1st Earl Howe and Anne Gore (a daughter of Adm. Sir John Gore). Together, they had two daughters and seven sons:

- James Albert Edward Hamilton, 3rd Duke of Abercorn (1869–1953), who married Lady Rosalind Cecilia Caroline Bingham, only daughter of Charles Bingham, 4th Earl of Lucan and Lady Cecilia Catherine Gordon-Lennox (a daughter of the 5th Duke of Richmond), in 1894.
- Lord Claud Penn Alexander Hamilton (1871–1871), who died in infancy.
- Lord Charlie Hamilton (1874–1874), who died in infancy.
- Lady Alexandra Phyllis Hamilton (1876–1918), who had Alexandra, Princess of Wales as sponsor at her baptism. She died when the RMS Leinster was torpedoed by a German U-boat and sank. She was unmarried.
- Lord Claud Francis Hamilton (1878–1878), who died aged 2 months.
- Lady Gladys Mary Hamilton (1880–1917), who married Ralph Francis Forward-Howard, 7th Earl of Wicklow in 1902.
- Lord Arthur John Hamilton (1883–1914), who was Deputy Master of the Household from 1913, Captain in the Irish Guards and was killed in action at the First Battle of Ypres.
- Stillborn son (1886–1886)
- Lord Claud Nigel Hamilton (1889–1975), a Captain in the Grenadier Guards, fought in the First World War and served in the household of King George V, his widow and Queen Elizabeth II as Deputy Master of the Household, as Extra Equerry, as Equerry in Ordinary and as Comptroller, Treasurer; he married Violet Ruby Ashton in 1933.

== Honours and arms ==
British

- CB: Companion of the Bath (civil division), 1865
- KG: Knight of the Garter, 10 August 1892

Foreign

- Austria-Hungary:
  - Commander of the Imperial Order of Leopold, 1881
  - Order of the Iron Crown
- Denmark: S.K.: Grand Cross of the Dannebrog, 10 March 1888
- Russian Empire: Order of St. Anna

== Notes ==
Parliament of the United Kingdom
Preceded by Sir Edmund Hayes, Bt; Thomas Conolly	Member of Parliament for County Donegal; 1860–1880; With: Thomas Conolly 1860–1876; William Wilson 1876–1879; Thomas Lea 1879–1880	Succeeded by Thomas Lea; John Kinnear
Honorary titles
Preceded by The Duke of Abercorn	Lord Lieutenant of Donegal; 1885–1913	Succeeded by Sir John Olphert
Masonic offices
Preceded by The 1st Duke of Abercorn	Grandmaster of the Grand Lodge of Ireland; 1886–1913	Succeeded by The Earl of Donoughmore
Military offices
Transferred to Special Reserve	Honorary Colonel of the North Irish Horse; 1908–1913	Succeeded by The Earl of Shaftesbury
Peerage of Ireland
Preceded by James Hamilton	Duke of Abercorn; 1885–1913	Succeeded by James Hamilton
