= 1879 County Donegal by-election =

UK parliamentary by-election

The 1879 County Donegal by-election was fought on 15 December 1879. The by-election, to one of two seats in the UK House of Commons constituency of County Donegal, arose due to the death of the incumbent Conservative MP, William Wilson.

Early reports suggested that the Conservative candidate would be Lord Mountcharles, son of the Marquess of Conyngham, who owned an estate in the county, and was said to be personally popular as his tenants enjoyed 'the largest measure of tenant-right'. A Mr McDavitt, a lawyer, was reported as the likely Liberal candidate, supporting Home Rule. Mountcharles issued an election address, promising to support improvements to the Land Act and 'extension of the principle of local government'. However he shortly after withdrew from the contest. The candidate nominated for the Conservatives was David Bartholomew McCorkell, a barrister from Derry; Thomas Lea, a manufacturer from Kidderminster in England, was nominated as the Liberal candidate . Lea, formerly MP for Kidderminster, had failed to win the Donegal seat in the previous by-election by less than 100 votes. Although this had for long been a Conservative seat, following the withdrawal of Lord Mountcharles there was an expectation that Lea would win. When the votes were counted, he had 2,313 votes as against 1,630 for McCorkell, a Liberal gain with a majority of 683.
