= Lea baronets =

Baronetcy in the Baronetage of the United Kingdom

The Lea Baronetcy, of The Larches in Kidderminster in the County of Worcester and Sea Grove in Dawlish in the County of Devon, is a title in the Baronetage of the United Kingdom. It was created on 6 October 1892 for Thomas Lea, Member of Parliament for Kidderminster, County Donegal and South Londonderry. The family descends from William Butcher, who in 1792 married Elizabeth, daughter of Francis Lea. Their son George Butcher assumed by Royal licence the surname of Lea in lieu of his patronymic in 1834. His son was the first Baronet.

== Lea baronets, of The Larches and Sea Grove (1892) ==
- Sir Thomas Lea, 1st Baronet (1841–1902)
- Sir Thomas Sydney Lea, 2nd Baronet (1867–1946)
- Sir Thomas Claude Harris Lea, 3rd Baronet (1901–1985)
- Sir Thomas Julian Lea, 4th Baronet (1934–1990)
- Sir Thomas William Lea, 5th Baronet (born 1973)

The heir presumptive is the present holder's brother Alexander Julian Lea (born 1978).

== Notes ==
Baronetage of the United Kingdom
Preceded by Dixon-Hartland baronets	Lea baronets of The Larches and Sea Grove; 6 October 1892	Succeeded by MacTaggart-Stewart baronets
