= John Kinnear (Irish politician) =

The Reverend John Kinnear

Member of Parliament for County Donegal
- In office 31 March 1880 – 24 November 1885 Serving with Sir Thomas Lea, 1st Baronet
- Preceded by: James Hamilton, 2nd Duke of Abercorn
- Succeeded by: Constituency abolished

Personal details
- Born: 1824 Clonaneese, County Tyrone, Ireland
- Died: 8 July 1909 (aged 84–85) Letterkenny, County Donegal, Ireland
- Resting place: Conwal Parish Church graveyard
- Party: Liberal
- Education: Royal Belfast Academical Institution
- Occupation: Politician, clergyman

Ecclesiastical career
- Religion: Presbyterian
- Church: First Letterkenny Presbyterian Church
- Ordained: 27 December 1848

Reverend John Kinnear (1824–1909) was an Irish Liberal party politician and Presbyterian minister. He was elected to the United Kingdom House of Commons as a Member of Parliament (MP) for County Donegal at the 1880 general election, and held the seat until the constituency was divided for the 1885 general election.

== Early life ==
Kinnear was born in Clonaneese near Dungannon, County Tyrone and was the second son of James Kinnear, a Presbyterian minister. He was educated at the Royal Belfast Academical Institution, having been denied admission to the Church of Ireland-affiliated Royal School in Dungannon due to being a 'dissenter'. He was licensed by the Presbytery of Dungannon on 2 November 1847, and ordained a minister of the First Letterkenny Presbyterian Church on 27 December 1848. He spent most of his life in Letterkenny, County Donegal.

Kinnear displayed a great interest in political reform early in his ministerial career. In late 1851, at a Tenant League demonstration in Omagh, he spoke in favour of using public pressure, both inside and outside parliament, for improving the legal position of tenants. He was also a proponent of a non-sectarian national school system called 'united education'. By the 1860s he argued for local government democratisation through abolishing the grand jury and replacing it with ratepayer-elected county boards. During preaching tours in the United States in the late 1860s, he was reportedly strongly influenced by democratic attitudes there. In 1870, he spoke at one of the largest Tenant League gatherings at the Market Square in Letterkenny, with 10,000 in attendance.

In 1874, he was the Moderator of the Synod of Derry and Omagh, and later that year received an honorary Doctorate of Divinity from Washington and Lee University.

== Political career ==
In March 1880, Kinnear became a last-minute candidate for the Liberal party, running alongside Thomas Lea, in that years general election. He ran on a platform of establishing peasant proprietorship and extending tenant rights, securing him the support of both Catholics and Presbyterians. On 7 April 1880, he was elected with 2,015 votes, defeating the Marquis of Hamilton who had received 1,954 votes. He was the first clergyman to be elected to the house of commons.

In late 1880 he pleaded with the Chief Secretary of Ireland, W. E. Forster, against the use of coercive measures in Inishowen. During 1881 he asserted that compulsory purchase of landed estates was the most suitable solution to tenurial discontent. In 1885, Kinnear spoke out in favour of Home Rule for Ireland. In the 1885 elections, a mixture of the constituency of Donegal being divided and a decline in his congregational support cost Kinnear his seat.

== Later life and death ==
In 1890 he was nominated for the position of Moderator in the Synod of Ulster, but inisted that his nomination be withdrawn. He later retired from pastoral duties entirely in 1899.

He married Margaret Fanny Alexander of Donoughmore, County Cork; they had two daughters and a son, all of whom died of consumption.

He died on 8 July 1909 at the Manse in Letterkenny, and is buried in the graveyard of Conwal Parish Church, Letterkenny. Kinnear Lane in Letterkenny is named after him.

Parliament of the United Kingdom
| Preceded by Thomas Lea; Marquess of Hamilton | Member of Parliament for County Donegal; 1880 – 1885; With: Thomas Lea | constituency divided |
