= Caillet monorail =

Type of monorail

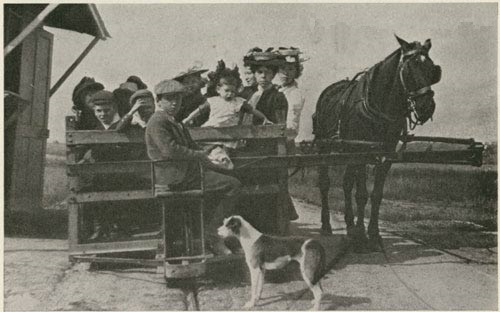
Hester's Horse Drawn Mono Rail on Canvey Island

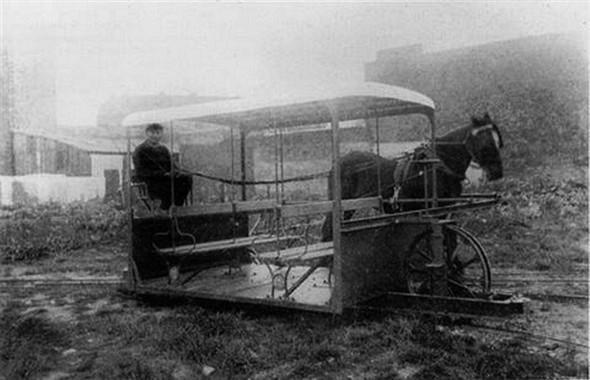
Passenger cars

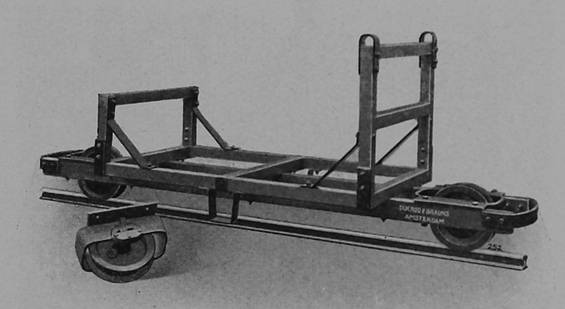
Cailet Monorail by Du Croo & Brauns

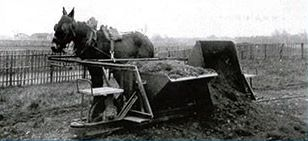
Tipping lorry

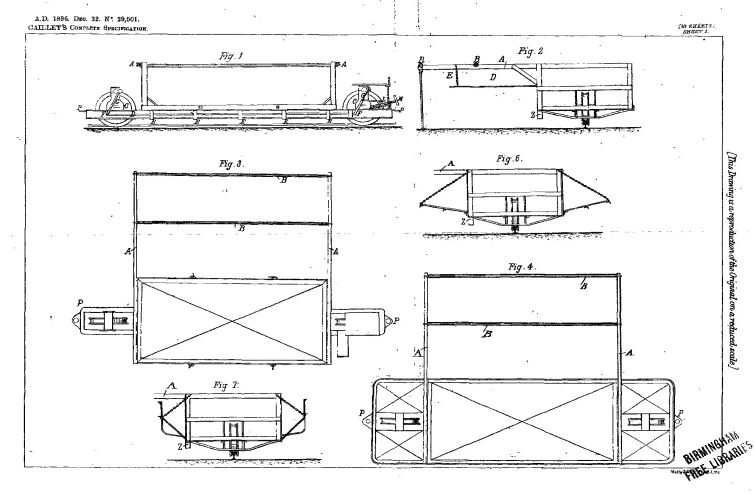
Sketch from the patent application of 1897

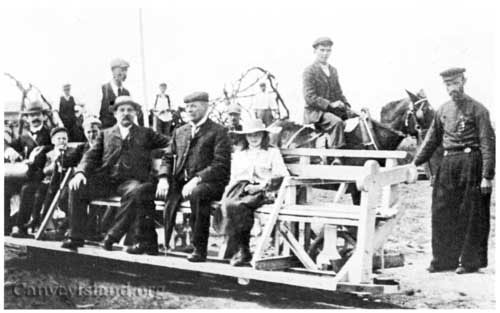
Hester's Horse Drawn Mono Rail on Canvey Island

The Caillet monorail was a monorail invented, patented and developed by Henry Jules Caillet at the end of the 19th century.

== Working principle ==
The rails of the Caillet monorail were laid directly on the ground on small support plates that were hooked to the inside of the rail. They were screwed together with fishplate tabs. Although there was only one rail, the lorries could each have two or four wheels in a row, all in line. Sleepers were not required, and the trackbed did not have to be ballasted. The rails could be laid on slopes in zig-zags.

The hand-operated lorries had 250 mm (10 inch) diameter wheels, but the larger vehicles driven by mules or horses had 500 mm (20 inch) diameter wheels. The traction of the carriages was applied from the side by means of one or two levers, and kept in balance by the operator or the draft animal. The freight wagons had two angled levers connected by moving shafts in which the horses were clamped. The distance between the floor of the vehicles and the rail never exceeded a few centimeters to keep the center of gravity as low as possible, thereby minimizing the effort required to maintain balance. When the lorry was not used it lay on one side. Some of the lorries had movable tail lifts to facilitate loading and unloading.

== Advantages and Disadvantages ==
The Caillet monorail has been used successfully in France, India and Malaysia in particular. In 1910, an article was published in the Country Gentlemen's Association Estate Book, according to which the benefits of a narrow-gauge railway for an agricultural estate had not been called into question. The investment costs could be reduced by the construction of a monorail by 75%. It consisted of 9-pound rails per yard, and a lorry balanced by a clerk or horse or wheel on a cantilever-mounted boom.

The system was so light that it could be temporarily moved over the fields without much effort. Transport costs were reduced to one-sixth compared with horse-drawn vehicles and the time required to one-third.

In June 1898, Henry Jules Caillet, who lived in 7 Boulevard St. Denis, Paris, granted a license to Eaton Devonshire of Chislehurst. Then in October 1898, the 'Monorail Portable Railway Company' was founded, which held the rights in Great Britain and the Commonwealth colonies. On November 17, 1905, an advertisement appeared in The Engineer for a book of the 'Monorail Portable Railway Company Limited', based in 22-23 Laurence Poutney Lane, London, in the Caillets at this time already well-known monorail system was described with numerous pictures. The company went out of business in 1924.

== Built routes ==
- Jubbulpore Gun Carriage Factory Monorail, 16 km (9.9 mi)
- Allapalli Sawmill Monorail, 6.4 km (4.0 mi)
- Quetta Municipality Night Soil Monorail, not successful, dismantled in 1902
- Itsari Water Supply Project Monorail, 1914, 22 km (14 mi)
- Brazil, from a mine to the coast, 112 km (70 mi)
- Loxton Farming Company, Australien, 11 km (6.8 mi)

== Patents ==
- Improvements in the Rolling Stock and Permanent Way of Single Rail Railways. Patent GB189629501 (A) of 13 November 1897.
- Rolling stock and permanent way of single rail railways. Patent CA64038 (A) of 29 September 1899.
- Matériel monorail de traction mécanique. Patent FR324729 (A) of 9 April 1903.

== See also ==
- Addis monorail
- Ewing monorail
- Larmanjat monorail
- Lartigue monorail
