= Edward Michael Conolly =

Irish politician

Edward Michael Conolly (23 August 1786 – 4 January 1849) was an Irish Member of Parliament.

He was born Edward Michael Pakenham, son of Admiral Sir Thomas Pakenham by his wife Louisa, daughter of John Staples and niece of Thomas Conolly of Castletown. His father was the fourth son of Thomas Pakenham, 1st Baron Longford and his wife Elizabeth, Baroness Longford. Catherine Pakenham (later Duchess of Wellington) was his first cousin.

He adopted the surname Conolly by Royal Licence on 27 August 1821, following the death of his great-aunt Lady Louisa Conolly.

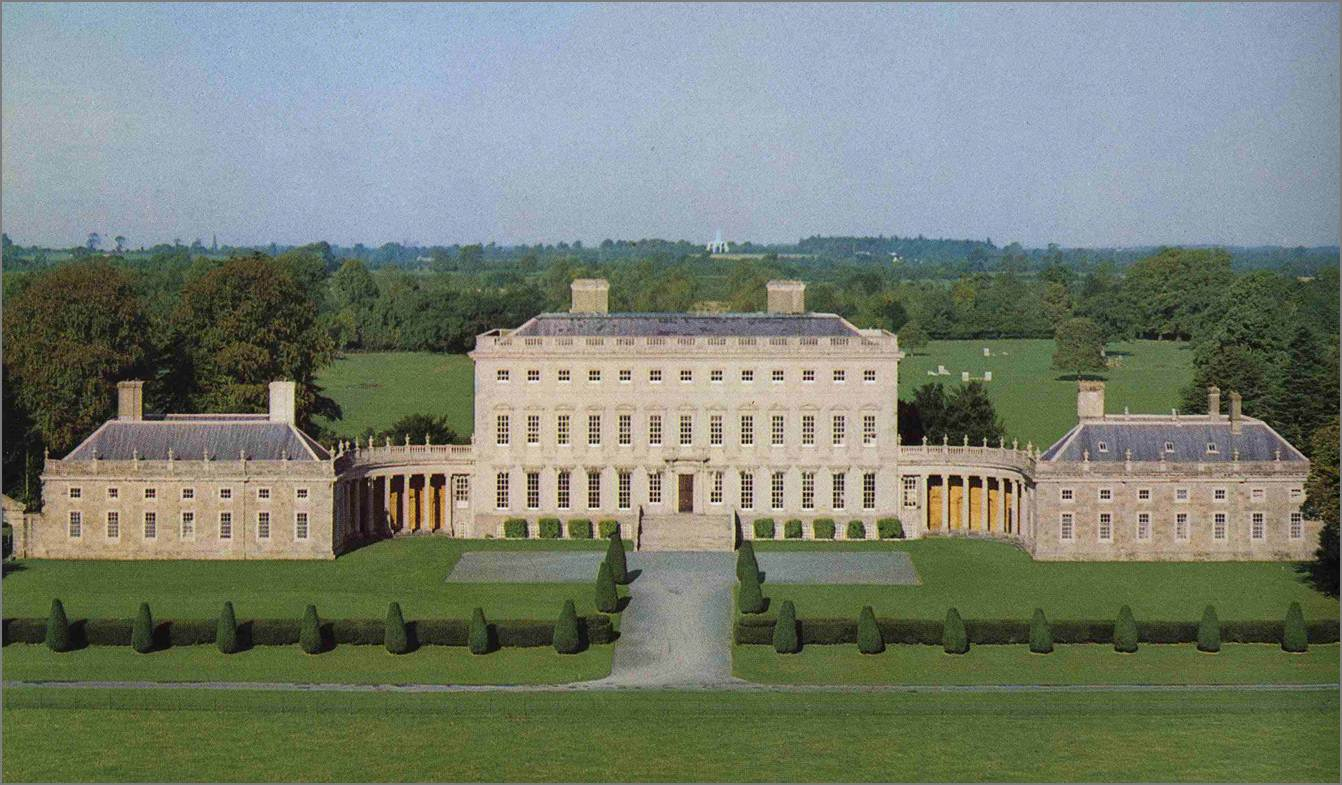
Castletown House

He lived at Castletown House in County Kildare, which he inherited from his great-aunt Louisa, and 'Cliff House' in County Donegal. He represented County Donegal in Parliament from the general election in 1831 until his death, and was a lieutenant-colonel in the Donegal Militia. The Conolly residence 'Cliff House' on the banks of the River Erne between Belleek, County Fermanagh and Ballyshannon, County Donegal was demolished as part of the Erne Hydroelectric scheme, which constructed the Cliff and Cathaleen's Fall hydroelectric power stations. Cliff hydroelectric power station was constructed on the site of 'Cliff House' and was commissioned in 1950.

He married on 20 May 1819 Catherine Jane, daughter of Chambré Brabazon Ponsonby-Barker. They had six sons and four daughters, including an eldest son Chambré Brabazon, who died in 1835; Thomas, who succeeded his father as MP for Donegal; Arthur Wellesley, who died at the Battle of Inkerman while serving as a captain in the 30th Regiment of Foot; John Augustus, who also served in the Crimean War and was awarded the Victoria Cross for his actions at Sebastopol as a lieutenant in the 49th Regiment of Foot; Richard, who served as Secretary of Legation at the British embassy in China; Louisa Augusta, who married Clotworthy Rowley, 3rd Baron Langford and died of drowning in 1853; and Mary Margaret, who married Henry Bruen.

Parliament of the United Kingdom
Preceded by George Vaughan Hart; Francis, Earl of Mount Charles	Member of Parliament for County Donegal; 1831 – 1849; With: Sir Edmund Hayes, Bt	Succeeded by Sir Edmund Hayes, Bt; Thomas Conolly
