= Letterkenny Town Park =

Public park in Letterkenny, Ireland

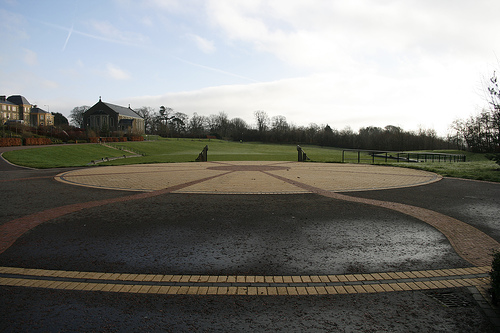
- Letterkenny Town Park
- Type: Public Park
- Location: Letterkenny, County Donegal, Ireland
- Area: 10 acres (40,000 m^{2})
- Created: 12 May 1999
- Operator: Donegal County Council, Letterkenny Municipal District
- Status: Open all year

Letterkenny Town Park (Irish: Páirc Baile Leitir Ceanainn) or Bernard McGlinchey Town Park, as it is officially known as, is a public park located in Letterkenny, County Donegal. It is located at University Hospital Roundabout, adjacent to St Conal's Hospital.

It was the largest public park in Letterkenny and in County Donegal from 1999 to 2009 until Ballymacool Park opened in the town on 24 May 2009.

== History ==
In mid-1995, the North Western Health Board leased "The Show Field" at St Conal's Hospital to the local council so as "to provid[e] this very considerable community amenity to the people of Letterkenny" with the intention to develop a town park.

The park is situated on the site of an 18th-century woodland. It was officially opened on 12 May 1999 by TD James McDaid.

The theme of the 40,000 m^{2} (10-acre) park is "Peace". The park is laid out with a herb garden, flower beds, mature and new trees, an orchard area, playing areas, bowling green, walks and playgrounds, has leaf-shaped gates at several entry points and has a tea room which opened in 2008.

In 2008 Letterkenny Town Council were urged to carry out a review of the park's security following a public sex act and bouts of anti-social behaviour, bullying, and vandalism.

In January 2017, vandals defecated on a children's slide in the park. The human excrement was first noticed when a group of parents scented a disgusting odour in the vicinity. They later discovered that the faeces had been smeared on the inside of the slide. Local politician Gerry McMonagle said: "There was a particularly bad smell because it was an enclosed slide and faeces were smeared down it.". The discovery of the faeces made the national newspapers. It led to calls for CCTV cameras to be installed in the park; this eventually came to pass. McMonagle said: "This is not an isolated incident, this is a regular occurrence. This is not the first time that human excrement was spread in that park ... There has been a litany of incidents ... There have been cover-ups." Another local politician, Dessie Shiels, warned of another public park in the west of the country having experienced the placing of melted razor blades into children's slides, saying: "We don't want what happened in Galway to happen here."

In mid-2018, work commenced on a multi-play unit in the play area of the park. A new Letterkenny Outdoor Gym (for which Healthy Ireland provided funding of €40,000) also came into use within the park's boundaries about this time; the groundwork had been begun earlier in the year, though its opening was announced then delayed on several occasions.

== Monuments ==
A Garden of Remembrance opened in honour of the memory of members of the Gardaí and Army who have given their lives in service of the United Nations. A stone bench was unveiled in the park on 10 July 2007 to honour James Duffy (VC).

== Events ==
Levity II Luminarium at the park on 15 July 2007

The park is the venue for the Party in the Park festival where local bands perform each August and also holds French Markets during the Year.

From 12 to 15 July 2007, a Levity II Luminarium was opened in the park. The luminarium is an inflatable environment, a participative sculpture made of translucent vinyl which has attracted nearly 2 million visitors in 34 countries around the world.
