= Lord Claud Hamilton (1889–1975) =

British Army officer and courtier

Lord Claud Hamilton GCVO CMG DSO
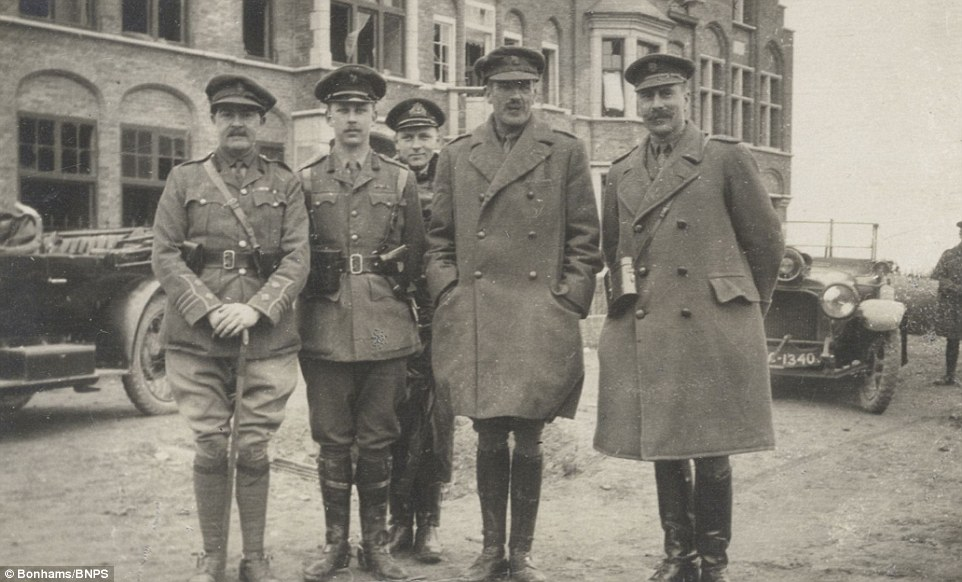
- Hamilton with fellow officers, including Prince Alexander of Teck, in Nieuport, March 1915
- Born: 10 November 1889; Mayfair, London
- Died: 22 August 1975 (aged 85); Newbury, Berkshire
- Spouse: Violet Newall (m. 1933)
- Parents: James Hamilton (father); Mary Curzon-Howe (mother)
- Relatives: James Hamilton (brother); Arthur Hamilton (brother)
- Military career
- Service: British Army
- Rank: Captain
- Units: Scots Guards; Grenadier Guards
- Wars: World War I

Lord Claud Nigel Hamilton GCVO CMG DSO (10 November 1889 – 22 August 1975) was a British Army officer and courtier. He was comptroller and treasurer to Queen Mary from 1936 until her death in 1953.

== Family and education ==
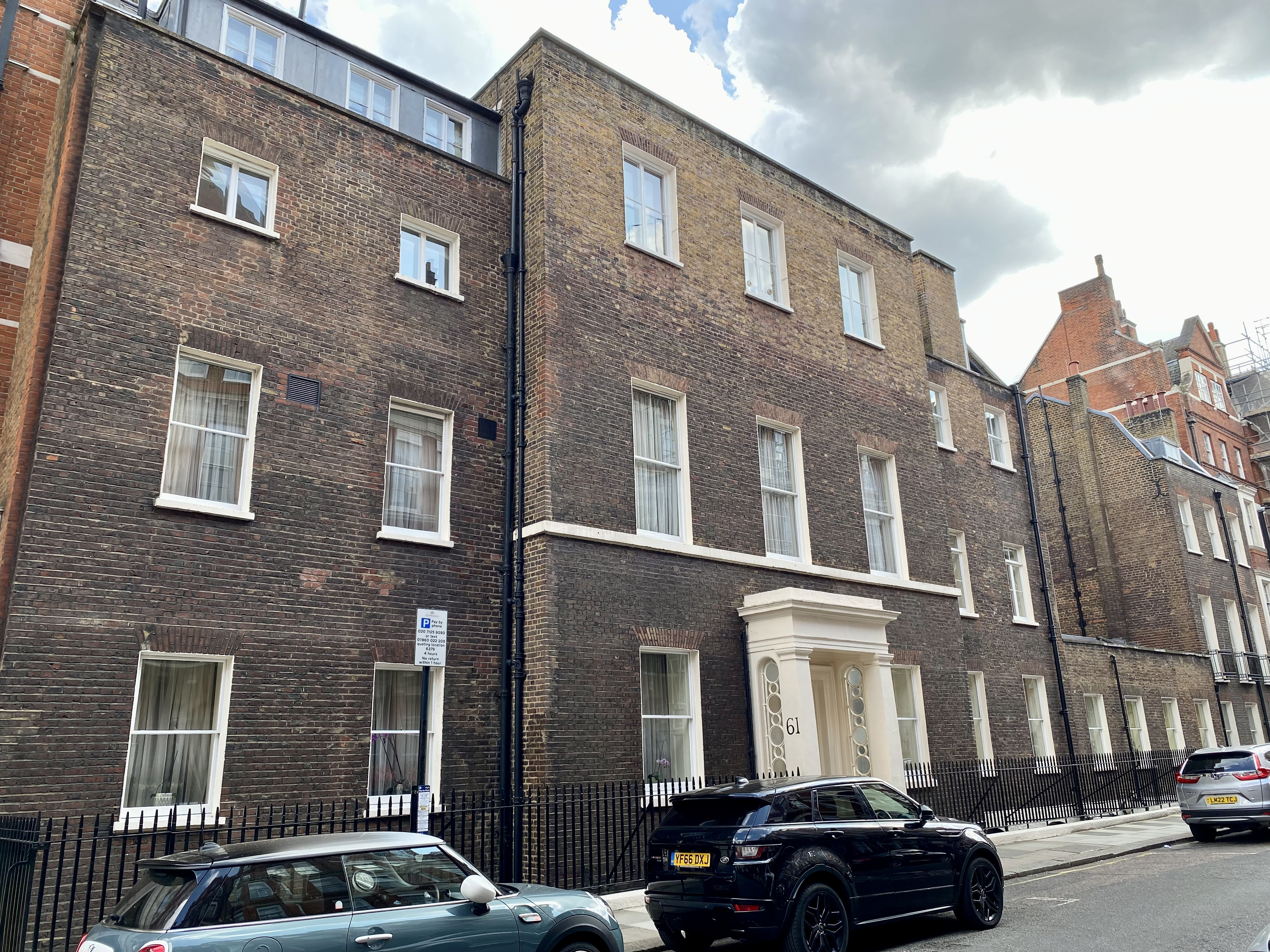
Lord Claud Hamilton's birthplace, Hampden House, 61 Green Street, Mayfair

Lord Claud was born at Hampden House, 61 Green Street, Mayfair, the seventh (but third surviving) son of James Hamilton, 2nd Duke of Abercorn and Lady Mary Anna Curzon-Howe. He was educated at Wellington College, Berkshire.

On 11 July 1933, he married Violet Ruby Newall (née Ashton), mother of Pamela Newall (later Baroness Sharples). They had no children.

== Career ==
=== Army ===
In 1907, he joined the 3rd Battalion (Lothian Regiment) of the Scots Guards as a Second Lieutenant, and transferred to the Grenadier Guards in 1909, having been promoted to the rank of Captain the previous year. During the First World War, he was mentioned in despatches in 1914 for having "commanded a machine-gun for five days and nights without relief, with great effect and under severe fire."

The same year, he was made a Companion of the Distinguished Service Order. In 1916, he was made an MVO as courtier to the Prince of Wales, and in 1918 he became an Officer of the Order of the Crown of Italy and was awarded the Croix de Guerre.

=== Royal household ===
In 1919, Lord Claud was employed as an equerry to Edward, Prince of Wales and made a CMG in 1920 for services to the Prince on his overseas visits.

In 1921, Hamilton was promoted as Deputy Master of the Household, made an Extra Equerry to King George V a year later and an Equerry in 1924.

In 1932, he was promoted to a CVO, and to a GCVO in 1937.

In 1936, he was one of the escorts of the gun carriage at the King's funeral and became Queen Mary's Comptroller, Treasurer and Extra Equerry that year. He served in these offices until her death in 1953, when he became an Extra Equerry to Elizabeth II until his own death in 1975 aged 85.

Political offices
Preceded by Sir Harry Stonor	Deputy Master of the Household; 1922–1924	Succeeded by Sir Smith Child, Bt
