= Sir James Stewart, 7th Baronet =

Irish politician

The Right Honourable Sir James Stewart, Bt

Member of Parliament for County Donegal
- In office 1802–1818 Serving with: Viscount Sudley (1802–1806); Henry Vaughan Brooke (1806–1808); Henry Montgomery (1808–1812); George Vaughan Hart (1812–1818)
- Preceded by: Henry Vaughan Brooke; Viscount Sudley
- Succeeded by: George Vaughan Hart, Earl of Mount Charles

High Sheriff of Donegal
- In office 1799–1800
- Preceded by: Alexander Stewart
- Succeeded by: John Atkinson

Member of Parliament for Enniskillen
- In office 1783–1790 Serving with John McClintock
- Preceded by: Sir John Blaquiere; John McClintock
- Succeeded by: Arthur Cole-Hamilton; Richard Magenis

Personal details
- Born: c. 1756
- Died: 20 May 1827 (aged 70–71)
- Spouse: Mary Susanna Whaley (after 1778)
- Children: 5
- Parents: Sir Annesley Stewart (Father); Mary Moore (Mother)
- Education: Trinity College Dublin

Sir James Stewart, 7th Baronet (c. 1756 – 20 May 1827) was an Irish politician.

== Early life ==
Stewart was born the eldest son and heir of Sir Annesley Stewart, 6th Baronet of Fort Stewart, County Donegal, and Mary (née Moore) Stewart. His father was an MP for Ballynakill in the Parliament of Ireland. He was educated privately and at Trinity College Dublin and succeeded his father in 1801.

His paternal grandparents were Gertrude (née Baillie) Moore (a daughter of Capt. Francis Baillie) and John Moore of Drumbanagher, also an MP for Ballynakill.

== Career ==
From 1783 to 1790, he represented Enniskillen in the Parliament of Ireland. He was appointed High Sheriff of Donegal for 1799 and served in that role until 1800. In 1802, he represented County Donegal in the Parliament of the United Kingdom, serving until 1818.

== Personal life ==
On 19 December 1778, Steward married Mary Susanna Whaley, the daughter of Richard Chapell Whaley, MP of Whaley Abbey. Together, they were the parents of two sons and three daughters, including:

- Anne Stewart (d. 1867), who married William Conolly Staples, son of John Staples, Irish MP, in July 1797. After his death in 1798, she married Richard Napier.
- Elizabeth Susanna Stewart (d. 1844), who married Charles Moysey, Archdeacon of Bath, in 1820.
- Sophia Frances Stewart (d. 1852), who married Andrew Rutherfurd, Lord Rutherfurd.
- Sir James Annesley Stewart, 8th Baronet (1788–1879), who married Jane Mansfield, daughter of Francis Mansfield, in 1830.
- William Henry Stewart (1793–1820), who fought in the Waterloo Campaign and died unmarried.

Sir James died on 20 May 1827 and was succeeded in the baronetcy by his son, James. As his son died without issue in 1879, the baronetcy passed to a distant cousin, Augustus Abraham James Stewart (1832–1889), who became the 9th Baronet.

Parliament of the United Kingdom
Preceded by Henry Vaughan Brooke; Viscount Sudley	Member of Parliament for County Donegal; 1802–1818; With: Viscount Sudley to 1806; Henry Vaughan Brooke 1806–08; Henry Montgomery 1808–12; George Vaughan Hart from 1812	Succeeded by George Vaughan Hart; Earl of Mount Charles
Parliament of Ireland
Preceded by Sir John Blaquiere; John McClintock	Member of Parliament for Ballynakill; 1783–1790; With: John McClintock	Succeeded by Arthur Cole-Hamilton; Richard Magenis
Baronetage of Ireland
Preceded by Annesley Stewart	Baronet (of Ramelton); 1801–1827	Succeeded by James Annesley Stewart
