= William Wilson (Donegal MP) =

Irish politician (1836–1879)

Member of Parliament for County Donegal
- In office 1876 – 8 November 1879 Serving with Viscount Hamilton
- Preceded by: Thomas Conolly
- Succeeded by: Thomas Lea

Personal details
- Born: 1836
- Died: 8 November 1879 (aged 43) Drumananey, Raphoe, County Donegal, Ireland
- Party: Conservative
- Occupation: Politician, lawyer

William Wilson (1836 – 8 November 1879) was an Irish lawyer and politician. He was elected to the United Kingdom House of Commons as Member of Parliament (MP) for County Donegal at a 1876 by-election, and held the seat until his death three years later. Wilson died on 8 November 1879 at his home in Drumananey near Raphoe, County Donegal, at the age of 43. He became a solicitor in 1860, and married in 1865. He sat in Parliament as a Moderate of the Conservative Party.

Parliament of the United Kingdom
Preceded by Thomas Conolly and Viscount Hamilton	Member of Parliament for County Donegal; 1876 – 1879; With: Viscount Hamilton	Succeeded by Thomas Lea and Viscount Hamilton
