= Prehen House =

House in Prehen, County Londonderry, Northern Ireland

Prehen House is a privately owned 18th-century Irish Georgian house at Prehen in County Londonderry.

Thought to have been designed by local architect Michael Priestley, it was built in 1740 for Andrew Knox, MP for County Donegal, after he married Prehen heiress Honoria Tomkins two years earlier. Andrew Knox's family owned the house for 170 years. After being seized by the government after the 1914–18 war, Prehen House was brought back into another branch of the Knox family.

The Department of the Environment has listed Prehen as a grade A building of national importance.

Prehen House is home to one of Ireland's greatest love stories, the legend of Half Hung MacNaghten.

The Northern Ireland Tourist Board considers Prehen House one of region's most historic houses. The house has also been a European Heritage Open Days site.
