= Prehen =

Coordinates: 54.978°N 7.339°W

Prehen: Irish: Preachan
- Location within Northern Ireland
  - Belfast: 75 mi (121 km)
- District: Derry and Strabane
- County: County Londonderry
- Country: Northern Ireland
- Sovereign state: United Kingdom
- Post town: LONDONDERRY
- Postcode district: BT47
- Dialling code: 028, +44 28
- UK Parliament: Foyle
- NI Assembly: Foyle

Prehen (possibly from Irish preachan, meaning 'place of the crow') is a small townland and estate outside the city of Derry, County Londonderry, Northern Ireland. The estate is located in the Prehen and Brickkilns townland. Roads in the Prehen area consist of Victoria road, Prehen Park (other streets in estate), Corrody Road and Woodside Road. The estate is located between Derry city and Newbuildings just off the A5 and is accessible this way while the townland is located on the eastern part of the City Of Derry Golf Course and part of the Woodside Road (Corrody road junction).

== Early history ==
Before the Plantation of Ulster in the early seventeenth century, Prehen was in the freehold of Captain Manus O'Cahan but was taken over by the Goldsmiths' Company of London. The first settlers arrived in the 1620s, but it was not until 1664 when the land was granted by charter to Alexander Tomkins, who established the main house, that it became truly habitable. Later, in 1738, the Prehen heiress Honoria Tomkins, great-granddaughter of Tomkins, married Andrew Knox of Rathmullan and Moneymore; he was the great-great-grandson of Andrew Knox, Bishop of the Isles, who first arrived in Ireland in 1609 from Scotland to establish the Protestant faith. In this way, Andrew Knox of Rathmullan and Moneymore acquired Prehen as his third property in 1740, after which he set about building Prehen House which stands in Prehen to this day.

== Half Hung MacNaghten ==
It was to Prehen House that John MacNaghten, later to be known as "Half-Hung" came, originally as a guest and friend of Knox, whose only daughter Mary Ann he tricked into an arranged marriage so that he could gain her dowry. Knox objected to his deceit and had him thrown out of Prehen, refusing to hand over the girl's fortune, and had the marriage eventually declared void on the grounds of the girl's age since MacNaghten was aged 34 and Mary Ann 16. MacNaghten, infuriated, but believing himself entitled to Mary Ann's £5000 marriage dowry, cursed the girl's father and swore bloody revenge on Knox and all his family in front of several witnesses and set in motion a plan to abduct the girl and then consummate the marriage, after which he believed Knox would have no choice but to hand over the money.

Over the next two years, MacNaghten stalked the girl around the country in his attempts to kidnap her but did not get a good enough opportunity until November 1761, when the Knox family were making their way by coach to Dublin for the opening of Parliament, as Knox was MP for County Donegal. It was during this ill-fated trip that MacNaghten ambushed the coach at gunpoint, with the help of accomplices, at Cloghcor Wood near Strabane but began a shooting match with the Knox servants during which he accidentally shot Mary Ann while aiming at her father, who was sitting next to her in the coach. At this, MacNaghten, though wounded, fled the scene but was later caught hiding in a hay-loft not far away. Mary Ann died from her wounds about four hours later and was returned to Prehen. The following day, she was taken to Rathmullan for burial in the family ancestral tomb.

MacNaghten was found guilty of murder at Lifford courthouse and sentenced to hang along with one of the captured accomplices, Thomas Dunlap. The hanging rope broke at the first attempt, and again a second time, to the amazement of the gathered crowd. Under the law of the time, MacNaghten was entitled to freedom as no man could be hanged three times for any crime, and the crowd encouraged him to escape. MacNaghten however, refused, allegedly saying that he could not go about the country and be pointed at as the "half-hanged man", preferring instead his own execution, after which he was successfully hanged a third time. He and his servant were both beheaded after execution and were buried in an unmarked grave at Patrick Street Graveyard, Church Street, Strabane.

Life at Prehen House continued, and each year on the anniversary of Mary Ann's death, her mother would retire to her room to lament her daughter's fate and would not emerge until the next day. She eventually recovered from her grief with the marriage of Mary Ann's brother George to Jane Mahon of Strokestown, County Roscommon, and this girl became as a second daughter to her. For 170 years the Knox family lived at Prehen, during which the house and estate were passed down the generations from father to eldest son.

== Baron George Von Scheffler ==
On the death of Colonel George Knox in 1910, Prehen passed to his German-born grandson, Baron George Von Scheffler, husband of Baroness Kathryn Von Gahan, who then became Baron Von Scheffler-Knox of Prehen. The Baron resided at Prehen only until 1914 when the Great War began, when, as an officer in the Prussian Guard, he was forced to leave Prehen as an enemy of the state. Prehen and all its holdings were confiscated by the British Government as enemy property. After the war, the estate was liquidated at public auction under the terms of the Trading With The Enemy Amendment Act 1914.

== Prehen Park ==
The house changed hands during the decades that followed and many of Prehen's fine old trees were cut down by a timber merchant to build newer houses. Prehen Park, a nearby private housing estate in Brickkilns was built on Prehen's borders in the 1960s.

== Dunwood Park and Stoneywood ==
Two other small estates located in the Prehen area are Dunwood and Stoneywood, the latter built in 2001 with fields purchased from Glover(farmer). Both estates are located just off the main A5 Victoria road

== Facts ==
Two quarries are located in Prehen, one, in Prehen Wood and the other on the Woodside road, both are now disused, the latter being occupied by WJ Chambers.

1689- A French officer, riding at the head of the troop at Prehen, was shot and killed from the opposite side of the river. He was shot by an expert marksman, William Houston from Newtoncunningham, using a long fowling piece. This feat was even more remarkable as Houston only had one eye. 1689- Over ten thousand men were entrenched in positions around Prehen during the Siege of Derry. Highwaymen frequently used the cover of Prehen Woods to attack coaches.

The main Derry–Dublin road between the City and Newbuildings was made in 1795. The Woodside road cuts through the upper part of the townland, where it meets the road leading to Kittybane and Corrody. There was once a settlement called Prehen with a school run by Col. Knox of Prehen House, a barracks, houses, and a shop.

== Restoration ==
Prehen House was acquired in 1971 by its current owners, the Peck family, formerly of Rathbeale Hall, who have since restored and revived it, officially opening it to the public in September 2004.
