= St Conal's Hospital =

- Health Service Executive
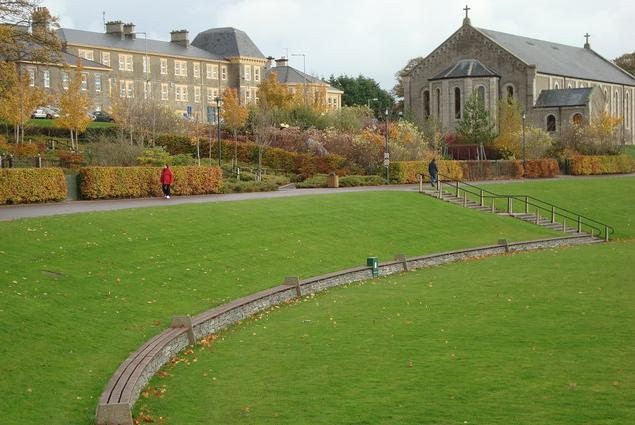
- St Conal's Hospital and chapel as seen from Letterkenny Town Park

- Shown in Ireland

Geography
- Location: Letterkenny, County Donegal,, Ireland
- Coordinates: 54.9596°N 7.7334°W

Organisation
- Care system: HSE
- Type: Specialist

Services
- Emergency department: No
- Speciality: Psychiatric hospital

History
- Founded: 1866
- Closed: 2010

St Conal's Hospital (Irish: Ospidéal Naomh Conaill) was a psychiatric hospital located in Letterkenny, County Donegal, Ireland. Opened in 1866 (as the Donegal District Lunatic Asylum), it had people work on its farm as recently as 1995. The building is still extant.

== History ==
Letterkenny asylum c. 1900

St Conal's seen from Letterkenny General Hospital

The hospital, which was designed by George Wilkinson in the neo-Georgian style using a corridor layout, was built by Matthew McClelland at a cost of £37,900 and opened as the Donegal District Lunatic Asylum in February 1866. At that time it accommodated 300 patients (150 male and 150 female). It has been described as "one of the finest buildings in the country".

A large new building was erected at the rear of the site in 1912. The facility became the Donegal Mental Hospital in the 1920s and benefited from a new chapel, designed in the neo-Norman style, being erected in the 1930s.

The facility was renamed St Conal's Hospital in 1956. As the hospital expanded nursing staff numbers reached close to 500 in the 1960s. After the introduction of deinstitutionalisation in the late 1980s the hospital went into a period of decline. However patients were still required to carry out activities on the hospital's working farm which only closed in 1995. Electroconvulsive therapy (ECT) was still being carried out on patients in the hospital in the late 1990s. The hospital had people work on its farm until 1995.

Seosamh Mac Grianna spent three decades at St Conal's Hospital.

On 27 August 2007, a blaze which broke out at 5:45 pm in a downstairs room took fire services approximately four hours to extinguish. The main hospital closed in 2010.

In March 2020, a memorial was to be unveiled at new Leck Cemetery to remember the hundreds of patients whom the Management Committee had buried in unmarked graves there from March 1902, when the means to dispose of their bodies on a site at the back of the hospital grounds ceased. The memorial had been due to be unveiled the previous December but poor weather forecasts prompted its postponement. The practice of burying dead patients there continued late into the twentieth century, almost until the hospital shut.

Since 2015, Lugh Films have been working on a documentary about life behind the hospital walls, intended as a "social history".

During the COVID-19 pandemic, St Conal's Hospital was used as a drive-through test centre.

== See also ==
- List of hospitals in the Republic of Ireland
