= Arthur Gore, 3rd Earl of Arran =

British politician

Arthur Saunders Gore, 3rd Earl of Arran (20 July 1761 – 20 January 1837), styled Viscount Sudley from 1773 to 1809, was an Irish peer and Tory Member of Parliament.

== Life ==
Arran was the eldest son of Arthur Saunders Gore, 2nd Earl of Arran, by his first wife the Hon. Catherine Annesley. In 1783, he was elected to the Irish House of Commons for Baltimore and Donegal Borough. He chose to sit for the first and represented the constituency until 1790. In 1800, he was returned for County Donegal until the Union with Great Britain took place at the end of the year. Subsequently, he sat then for County Donegal in the House of Commons of the United Kingdom to 1806. In 1809 he succeeded his father as third Earl of Arran, but as this was an Irish peerage it did not entitle him to a seat in the House of Lords of the United Kingdom.

Lord Arran married Mary Tyrell, daughter of Sir John Tyrell, 5th Baronet, in 1787. They had no children. He died in January 1837, aged 75, and was succeeded in his titles by his nephew Philip.

Parliament of Ireland
Preceded by Henry Vaughan Brooke; Henry Cope	Member of Parliament for Donegal Borough; 1783; With: Henry Hatton	Succeeded by Henry Hatton; Sir John Evans-Freke, 2nd Bt
Preceded by William Evans; James Chatterton	Member of Parliament for Baltimore; 1783–1790; With: Richard Longfield	Succeeded by Sir John Evans-Freke, 2nd Bt; Richard Grace
Preceded by Henry Vaughan Brooke; Alexander Montgomery	Member of Parliament for County Donegal; 1800–1801; With: Henry Vaughan Brooke	Succeeded by Parliament of the United Kingdom
Parliament of the United Kingdom
New constituency	Member of Parliament for County Donegal; 1801–1806; With: Henry Vaughan Brooke 1801–1802; Sir James Stewart 1802–1806	Succeeded by Sir James Stewart; Henry Vaughan Brooke
Peerage of Ireland
Preceded by Arthur Saunders Gore	Earl of Arran; 1809–1837	Succeeded by Philip York Gore
