= Henry Vaughan Brooke =

Irish politician (1743–1807)

Colonel Henry Vaughan Brooke (1743 – 27 November 1807) was an Irish politician.

== Background ==
Brooke originated from a family with roots in County Fermanagh as well as County Donegal and was the son of Basil Brooke. His mother was Jane, daughter of Henry Wrey. He was educated at Trinity College Dublin until 1761 and when his father died seven years later, he inherited the latter's estates. Brooke was unmarried and following his death was succeeded by his nephew Thomas Grove, who thereupon assumed his uncle's surname.

== Career ==
Brooke entered the Irish House of Commons in 1776, having been elected for Donegal Borough. In 1783, he stood successfully for both County Donegal as well as Augher, choosing to sit for the former constituency. He represented it until the Act of Union 1801 and then gained a seat in the British House of Commons for the new established constituency County Donegal until 1802. By support of his friend Henry Conyngham, 1st Marquess Conyngham, Brooke was returned for Donegal again in 1806, however died only a year later. He was nominated High Sheriff of Donegal in 1786 and became colonel of the county's militia in 1798.

== Arms ==
Coat of arms of Henry Vaughan Brooke
Notes Granted posthumously to Brooke and his descendants by Sir Chicester Fortescue, Ulster King of Arms, on 26 February 1808, on petition by Thomas Grove. Crest A badger passant Proper. Escutcheon Or a cross engrailed per pale Gules and Sable. Motto Gloria Finis

== Notes ==
Parliament of Ireland
Preceded by Barry Yelverton; James Cuffe	Member of Parliament for Donegal Borough; 1776–1783; With: James Cuffe 1776–1777; Robert Longfield 1777–1779; Henry Cope 1779–1783	Succeeded by Henry Hatton; Viscount Sudley
Preceded by Robert Clements; Alexander Montgomery	Member of Parliament for County Donegal; 1783–1801; With: Alexander Montgomery 1783–1800; Viscount Sudley 1800–1801	Succeeded by Parliament of the United Kingdom
Preceded by George Hamilton; Sir William Fortick	Member of Parliament for Augher; 1783; With: William Richardson	Succeeded by William Richardson; Samuel Hayes
Parliament of the United Kingdom
Preceded by Parliament of Ireland	Member of Parliament for County Donegal; 1801–1802; With: Viscount Sudley	Succeeded by Sir James Stewart, 7th Bt; Viscount Sudley
Preceded by Sir James Stewart, 7th Bt; Viscount Sudley	Member of Parliament for County Donegal; 1806–1807; With: Sir James Stewart, 7th Bt	Succeeded by Sir James Stewart, 7th Bt; Henry Conyngham Montgomery
