= Edmund Samuel Hayes =

- Born: 2 July 1806; Donegal (UK)
- Died: 23 June 1860 (aged 53)
- Citizenship: United Kingdom
- Occupation: political

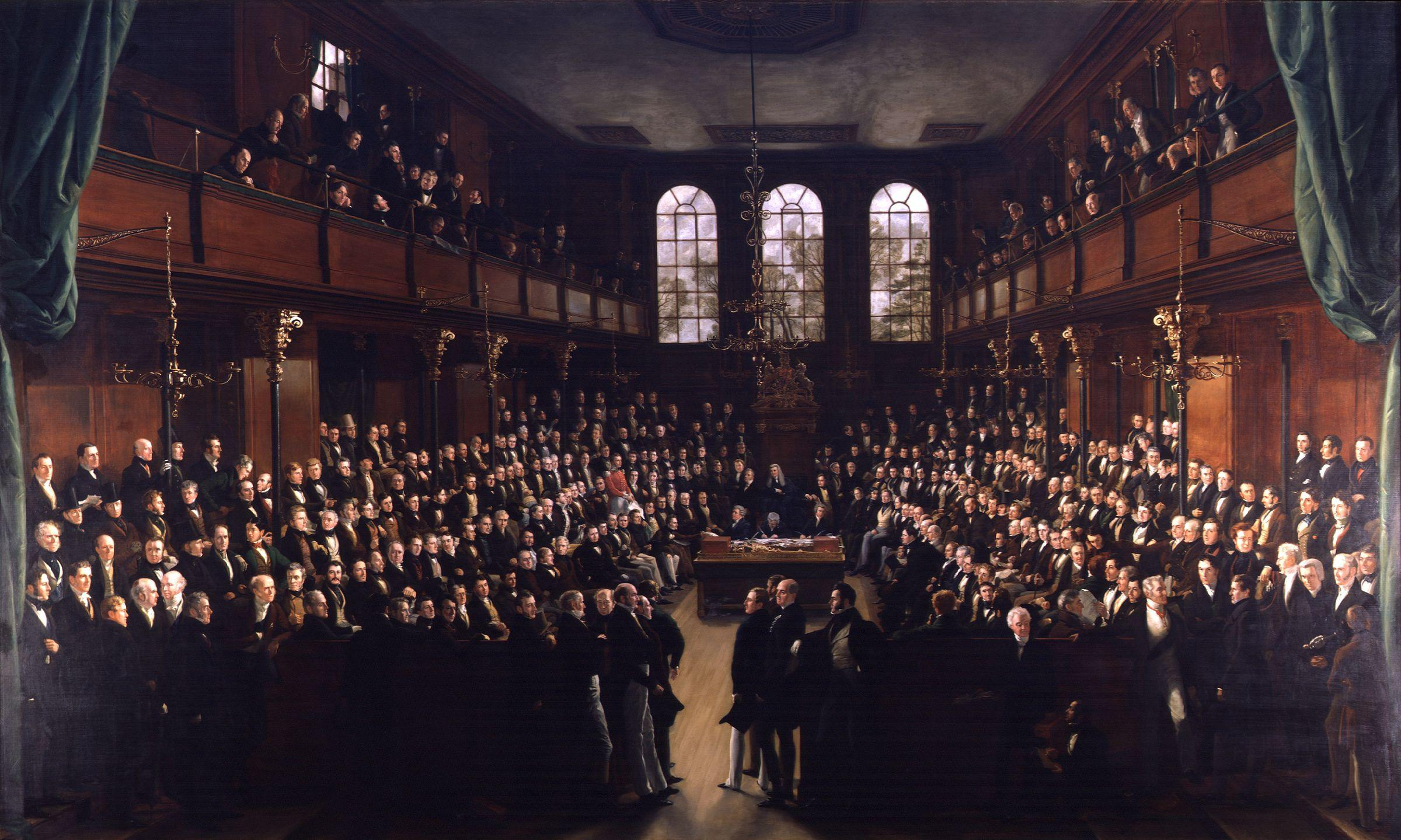

Sir Edmund Samuel Hayes, 3rd Baronet MP (2 July 1806 – 23 June 1860) of Drumboe Castle, County Donegal was a Baronet in the Baronetage of Ireland and Member of Parliament for County Donegal from 1831 to 1860.

== Family ==
He was born on 2 July 1806, the son of Sir Samuel Hayes, 2nd Baronet and Elizabeth Lighton, daughter of Sir Thomas Lighton, 1st Baronet MP of Merville, County Dublin.

He was educated at Trinity College, Dublin in 1823. He was appointed High Sheriff of Donegal for 1830–31.

On 3 July 1837, he married Emily Pakenham, daughter of Hon. Hercules Robert Pakenham. The children from this marriage were:

- Sir Samuel Hercules Hayes, 4th Baronet (3 February 1840 – 7 November 1901)
- Sir Edmund Francis Hayes, 5th Baronet (1850 - 1912)
- Emily Anne Hayes
- Mary Frances Hayes
- Alice Caroline Hayes
- Emma Agnes Hayes
- Georgina Mary Anne Hayes
- Louisa Lydia Hayes

He died on 23 June 1860.

== Career ==
He was campaigned in the 1831 United Kingdom general election and was elected Member of Parliament for County Donegal which he held until his death in 1860.

He was a founding member of the Carlton Club.

== Notes ==
Parliament of the United Kingdom
Preceded by Earl of Mount Charles; George Vaughan Hart	Member of Parliament for County Donegal; 1831 – 1860; With: Edward Conolly 1831–1849; Thomas Conolly 1849–1875	Succeeded by Viscount Hamilton; Thomas Conolly
Baronetage of Ireland
Preceded by Samuel Hayes	Baronet (of Drumboe Castle); 1827–1860	Succeeded by Samuel Hercules Hayes
