= 1876 County Donegal by-election =

UK Parliamentary by-election

The 1876 County Donegal by-election was fought on 26 August 1876. The by-election was fought due to the death of the incumbent Conservative MP, Thomas Conolly. It was won by the Conservative candidate William Wilson, who beat the Liberal candidate, Thomas Lea, former member for Kidderminster, by 1,975 votes to 1,876, a majority of 99.
