= Ballymacool Park =

Park in County Donegal, Ireland

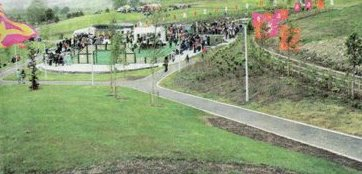
- Ballymacool Park
- Type: Public Park
- Location: Letterkenny, County Donegal, Ireland
- Area: 20 acres (81,000 m^{2})
- Created: 24 May 2009
- Operator: Letterkenny Town Council
- Open: All year

Ballymacool Park (Irish: Páirc Bhaile Mhic Comhghaill) is a 20-acre (81,000 m^{2}) public park located in Letterkenny, County Donegal, Ireland. The park is located on the Glenties Road, not far from O'Donnell Park and the local sports complex. The park has an entrance on each side of the Letterkenny to Glenties Road. It is the largest in Letterkenny and County Donegal, taking over from Letterkenny Town Park.

== History ==
Work commenced on the €3.8 million park in August 2007 and was completed in early 2009. The park is built on a site near Ballymacool House which was donated to Letterkenny Town Council as a result of rezoning in the Ballymacool area.

=== Ballymacool House ===
John Boyd, born in 1739, and High Sheriff of Donegal in 1772–73, purchased the Ballymacool House and estate from the Span family in 1798. The estate was passed to his eldest son John Boyd, a barrister, on his marriage to Frances Hayes, in 1799. He was succeeded by his nephew, William Henry Porter, under the condition that he assume the surname Boyd, which he did by Royal Licence in 1891. He was father to Mary Rosalie Boyd, the South African poet. The founding member of the Apprentice Boys of Derry was also called John Boyd (1767–1836). He was a Captain in the Letterkenny Corps of the Donegal Militia, and a Freeman of the City of Londonderry. In 1830 John Boyd presented the Apprentice Boys with the saddle on which Governor Walker rode at the Siege of Derry in 1689. The Australian artist Arthur Merric Boyd and his family are descended from the Boyds of Ballymacool.

The house became occupied by Republican soldiers in 1921. During the occupation a silver plate which had been in the Boyd family since 1467 was stolen. The Boyd family crest was inscribed on the silver which was received by Thomas Boyd, Earl of Arran on his marriage to Mary Stewart, Princess of Scotland, daughter of James II of Scotland.

The Weekly Irish Times dated 11 May 1940 described the Ballymacool Estate as "well kept and extensive gardens embellished by the pine walk near the house, comprising a variety of rare conifers, amongst which are some of the finest specimens in Ireland". In 1941 the trees were felled by the new owner for timber. Replanting never took place. The house passed out of the Boyd family to the Kelly's in 1941. In the mid-1980s the Ballymacool Estate was sold. It was gradually sold off to private and public developers.

Remains of pathways, walled gardens, orchards and the shell of Ballymacool House are still visible. Trees include a huge Wellingtonia, a Sequoia and a Tsuga heterophylla. Several members of the Boyd dynasty are buried on the estate.

== Features ==
The park has picnic and park benches located throughout. Visitors walk on asphalt and water bound pathways which are bounded by kerbing. There are two buildings located on the site, a maintenance building and a toilet block. Earth mounds were created in order to change the topography. There are three special gardens secluded from the main green area. A hard surface used for basketball and football. There is also a children's playground.
