= Half Hung MacNaghten =

Anglo-Irish land owner, gambler and convicted murderer

John MacNaghten (1722–1761), known as Half-Hanged MacNaghten, was an Anglo-Irish land owner, gambler and convicted murderer. The more romantic versions of the tale portray MacNaghten's victim Mary Ann as his lover whose marriage was forbidden by her overbearing father.

== Life ==
MacNaghten was born into a landed Anglo-Irish family and attended Raphoe Royal school in County Donegal. In 1740, he inherited his family estate worth £500 a year (equivalent to £84,000 in 2025) and that same year entered Trinity College, Dublin. MacNaghten married the sister-in-law of the first earl of Massereene. However, he was quickly enamoured of the extravagant lifestyle of Ascendancy Dublin where he became a popular and colourful character. He developed an addiction to gambling and squandered away a large part of his inheritance, running up substantial gaming debts and by 1750 was threatened with arrest.

Following the death of his wife in childbirth, he was appointed to the lucrative post of tax collector for Coleraine but gambled away £800 of the King's money. His estate was sequestered and by 1760 he was penniless.

He gained support in trying to help overcome his addiction from a childhood friend, Andrew Knox. Knox was a wealthy land-owner and MP for Donegal who lived on an estate at Prehen about 2 miles outside the City of Derry. Mary Ann, Knox's 15-year-old daughter, was already a substantial heiress, having received some £6,000, and would have collected a further legacy if her brother died without issue. MacNaghten and Mary Ann developed a relationship as the former visited Prehen regularly. Nonetheless, by 1761 their relationship had run into difficulties.

In November 1761, an attempt by MacNaghten and his followers to abduct Mary Ann from a carriage on a family journey to Dublin Parliament and elope with her failed, when he shot and mortally wounded her by mistake. He was taken to Lifford Courthouse in Donegal, where a court found MacNaghten guilty of murder and he was sentenced to execution by hanging. MacNaghten hurled himself from the gallows with such force that the rope broke. He had the sympathy of the crowd who believed this was divine intervention for a man distraught with grief over the death of his love. Despite the belief that MacNaghten could not be hanged a second time, he failed to use the cover of a sympathetic crowd to make good his escape and was hanged successfully at the second attempt, on Tuesday 15 December 1761.

The tale is one which is encased within the Ascendancy of 18th century Ireland. Tradition portrays John MacNaghten as the heroic rogue of Irish folklore who rebelled against the authority of the landowning class and, in challenging them, was seen to have fought against them. His immense loyalty to his servants and followers, especially his manservant Thomas Dunlap who was hanged immediately after MacNaghten, has presented him in the myth as a champion of the under-class.

As for the attempted kidnap of Mary Ann, the practice of abduction and marriage was prevalent in 18th century Ireland among young men of social standing but with little property. And, within their society, it was tolerated. The practice was the subject of the 2002 romantic comedy The Abduction Club, starring Daniel Lapaine and Sophia Myles.

MacNaghton and Dunlap where buried together at Patrick Street graveyard, Strabane, County Tyrone.
