= Clonaneese =

Lower Clonaneese

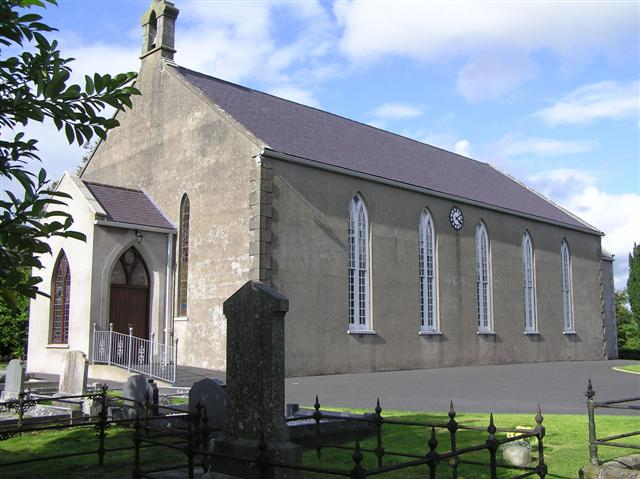
Upper Clonaneese

Clonaneese (also spelled Clonenis, Clenaneese or Clananeese) means in Irish "Angus' meadow". Before 1600, it was the home of the McDonald's, a Scottish galloglass family who helped defend The O'Neill in Dungannon.

== Overview ==
The area known as Clonaneese is situated midway between Dungannon and Ballygawley in County Tyrone, Northern Ireland.

The 1609 Bodley map shows 27 townlands there. One of these townlands, Killeeshil, gave its name to the parish which covers the most of Clonaneese. The Clonaneese name was used for the Poor Law Union and the electoral district, but is mainly associated with the two Presbyterian congregations, Lower and Upper Clonaneese.

The first Presbyterians in the Clonaneese area worshipped in the Parish Church in Killeeshil. In 1617, the Rev Robert Hamilton, a Scottish Presbyterian, was installed as rector. He did not conduct the services according to the rituals of the Anglican Church and was ejected for this non-conformity in 1622. The Presbyterians built a small mud house in the townland of Innish, commonly called the "Clabber House", to meet for worship. In 1728, they applied for a Minister of their own and supplies of preaching were granted. In 1743, they rented land from the Earl of Charlemont and built a new meeting house the next year, 1744. Some years later, a mill race was dug within a few feet off the meeting house and this caused flooding. Therefore, in 1788, money was raised to raise the building, which was built in a hollow beside the Oona Water. When the money was raised the minister and a majority of the Congregation decided to build a new meeting house on higher ground. Many others objected, saying they did not want to be "removed from their ancient seat". The new meeting house was built while the others remained, both called themselves Clonaneese, but in 1809, they were in the Presbyteries of Upper and Lower Tyrone, and as geographically the upper and lower names suited they have been officially known as this since.

In 2009, the Killeeshil and Clonaneese Historical Society was formed, bringing together the names by which this area is known, and the people of Killeeshil and Clonaneese. Various community events have taken place and one of the highlights was being the subject of a Lesser Spotted Ulster program on UTV.

== See also ==
- List of townlands of County Tyrone
