= County Donegal (UK Parliament constituency) =

Former parliamentary constituency in the United Kingdom

- Former county constituency for the House of Commons
- Location of County Donegal within Ireland.
- County: County

1801–1885
- Seats: 2
- Created from: County Donegal (IHC)
- Replaced by: North Donegal; East Donegal; South Donegal; West Donegal

County Donegal was a UK Parliament constituency in Ireland from 1801 to 1885, returning two Members of Parliament (MPs).

== Boundaries ==
This constituency comprised the whole of County Donegal. In 1885, it was divided into separate constituencies of East Donegal, North Donegal, South Donegal and West Donegal.

== Members of Parliament ==
- Constituency created (1801)

Election	1st Member	1st Party	2nd Member	2nd Party
1801	Henry Vaughan Brooke		Viscount Sudley	Tory
1802	Sir James Stewart, Bt		Viscount Sudley	Tory
1806	Sir James Stewart, Bt		Henry Vaughan Brooke	
1808	Sir James Stewart, Bt		Henry Montgomery	Tory
1812	Sir James Stewart, Bt		George Vaughan Hart	Tory
1818	Earl of Mount Charles	Tory	George Vaughan Hart	Tory
1825	Earl of Mount Charles	Tory	George Vaughan Hart	Tory
1831	Sir Edmund Hayes	Tory	Edward Conolly	Tory
1831	Sir Edmund Hayes	Conservative	Edward Conolly	Conservative
1849	Sir Edmund Hayes	Conservative	Thomas Conolly	Conservative
1860	Viscount Hamilton (known as the Marquess of Hamilton from August 1868)	Conservative	Thomas Conolly	Conservative
1876	Viscount Hamilton (known as the Marquess of Hamilton from August 1868)	Conservative	William Wilson	Conservative
1879	Viscount Hamilton (known as the Marquess of Hamilton from August 1868)	Conservative	Thomas Lea	Liberal
1880	John Kinnear	Liberal	Thomas Lea	Liberal

- Constituency abolished (1885)

== Elections ==
=== Elections of the 1880s ===
General election 1880: Donegal
Party	Candidate	Votes	%	±%
Liberal	Thomas Lea	2,274	36.4	+12.2
Liberal	John Kinnear	2,015	32.3	+9.0
Irish Conservative	James Hamilton	1,954	31.3	−21.2
Majority		61	1.0	N/A
Turnout		4,228 (est)	91.7 (est)	+9.4
Registered electors		4,612		
Liberal gain from Irish Conservative		Swing	+11.4	
Liberal gain from Irish Conservative		Swing	+9.8	

=== Elections of the 1870s ===
By-election, 15 Dec 1879: Donegal
Party	Candidate	Votes	%	±%
Liberal	Thomas Lea	2,313	58.7	+11.2
Irish Conservative	David Bartholomew McCorkell	1,630	41.3	−11.2
Majority		683	17.4	N/A
Turnout		3,943	84.3	+2.0 (est)
Registered electors		4,680		
Liberal gain from Irish Conservative		Swing	+11.2	

- Caused by Wilson's death.

By-election, 26 Aug 1876: Donegal
Party	Candidate	Votes	%	±%
Irish Conservative	William Wilson	1,975	51.3	−1.2
Liberal	Thomas Lea	1,876	48.7	+1.2
Majority		99	2.6	+2.1
Turnout		3,851	83.8	+1.5 (est)
Registered electors		4,597		
Irish Conservative hold		Swing	−1.2	

- Caused by Conolly's death.

General election 1874: Donegal
Party	Candidate	Votes	%	±%
Irish Conservative	James Hamilton	2,102	27.8	N/A
Irish Conservative	Thomas Conolly	1,866	24.7	N/A
Liberal	Tristram Kennedy	1,826	24.2	New
Liberal	Evory Kennedy	1,757	23.3	New
Majority		40	0.5	N/A
Turnout		3,776 (est)	82.3 (est)	N/A
Registered electors		4,587		
Irish Conservative hold		Swing	N/A	
Irish Conservative hold		Swing	N/A	

=== Elections of the 1860s ===
General election 1868: Donegal
Party	Candidate	Votes	%	±%
Irish Conservative	Thomas Conolly	Unopposed		
Irish Conservative	James Hamilton	Unopposed		
Registered electors		4,596		
Irish Conservative hold				
Irish Conservative hold				

General election 1865: Donegal
Party	Candidate	Votes	%	±%
Irish Conservative	Thomas Conolly	Unopposed		
Irish Conservative	James Hamilton	Unopposed		
Registered electors		4,685		
Irish Conservative hold				
Irish Conservative hold				

By-election, 17 July 1860: Donegal
Party	Candidate	Votes	%	±%
Irish Conservative	James Hamilton	Unopposed		
Irish Conservative hold				

- Caused by Hayes' death.

=== Elections of the 1850s ===
General election 1859: Donegal
Party	Candidate	Votes	%	±%
Irish Conservative	Thomas Conolly	Unopposed		
Irish Conservative	Edmund Hayes	Unopposed		
Registered electors		4,307		
Irish Conservative hold				
Irish Conservative hold				

General election 1857: Donegal
Party	Candidate	Votes	%	±%
Irish Conservative	Thomas Conolly	Unopposed		
Irish Conservative	Edmund Hayes	Unopposed		
Registered electors		4,254		
Irish Conservative hold				
Irish Conservative hold				

General election 1852: Donegal
Party	Candidate	Votes	%	±%
Irish Conservative	Thomas Conolly	1,839	39.9	N/A
Irish Conservative	Edmund Hayes	1,624	35.3	N/A
Whig	Patrick Francis Campbell-Johnston	1,143	24.8	New
Majority		481	10.5	N/A
Turnout		2,875 (est)	76.7 (est)	N/A
Registered electors		3,748		
Irish Conservative hold		Swing	N/A	
Irish Conservative hold		Swing	N/A	

=== Elections in the 1840s ===
By-election, 20 February 1849: Donegal
Party	Candidate	Votes	%	±%
Irish Conservative	Thomas Conolly	Unopposed		
Irish Conservative hold				

- Caused by Conolly's death

General election 1847: Donegal
Party	Candidate	Votes	%	±%
Irish Conservative	Edward Michael Conolly	Unopposed		
Irish Conservative	Edmund Hayes	Unopposed		
Registered electors		848		
Irish Conservative hold				
Irish Conservative hold				

General election 1841: Donegal
Party	Candidate	Votes	%	±%
Irish Conservative	Edward Michael Conolly	Unopposed		
Irish Conservative	Edmund Hayes	Unopposed		
Registered electors		1,446		
Irish Conservative hold				
Irish Conservative hold				

=== Elections of the 1830s ===
General election 1837: Donegal
Party	Candidate	Votes	%
Irish Conservative	Edmund Hayes	Unopposed	
Irish Conservative	Edward Michael Conolly	Unopposed	
Registered electors		1,960	
Irish Conservative hold			
Irish Conservative hold			

General election 1835: Donegal
Party	Candidate	Votes	%
Irish Conservative	Edmund Hayes	Unopposed	
Irish Conservative	Edward Michael Conolly	Unopposed	
Registered electors		1,618	
Irish Conservative hold			
Irish Conservative hold			

General election 1832: Donegal
Party	Candidate	Votes	%	±%
Tory	Edmund Hayes	795	38.2	+2.4
Tory	Edward Michael Conolly	734	35.3	+3.2
Whig	Hamilton Francis Chichester	552	26.5	−5.5
Majority		182	8.8	−6.8
Turnout		1,323	91.4	c. +1.4
Registered electors		1,448		
Tory hold		Swing	+2.6	
Tory hold		Swing	+3.0	

General election 1831: Donegal
Party	Candidate	Votes	%
Tory	Edmund Hayes	416	35.8
Tory	Edward Michael Conolly	373	32.1
Whig	Sir Thomas Style, 8th Baronet	192	16.5
Whig	Arthur Chichester	180	15.5
Majority		181	15.6
Turnout		c. 600	c. 90.0
Registered electors		c. 667	
Tory hold			
Tory hold			

General election 1830: Donegal
Party	Candidate	Votes	%
Tory	George Vaughan Hart	Unopposed	
Tory	Francis Conyngham	Unopposed	
Registered electors		667	
Tory hold			
Tory hold			

=== Elections of the 1810s ===
General election 1818: Donegal
Party	Candidate	Votes	%	±%
Tory	George Vaughan Hart	Unopposed	N/A	N/A
Tory	Henry Conyngham	Unopposed	N/A	N/A

General election 1812: Donegal
Party	Candidate	Votes	%	±%
	James Stewart	Unopposed	N/A	N/A
Tory	George Vaughan Hart	Unopposed	N/A	N/A

=== Elections of the 1800s ===
1808 County Donegal by-election
Party	Candidate	Votes	%	±%
Tory	Henry Conyngham Montgomery	433	54.8	N/A
Tory	George Vaughan Hart	357	45.2	N/A
Majority		76	9.6	N/A
Turnout		790		N/A
Tory gain from		Swing		

General election 1807: Donegal
Party	Candidate	Votes	%	±%
	James Stewart	Unopposed	N/A	N/A
	Henry Vaughan Brooke	Unopposed	N/A	N/A

General election 1806: Donegal
Party	Candidate	Votes	%	±%
	James Stewart	Unopposed	N/A	N/A
	Henry Vaughan Brooke	Unopposed	N/A	N/A

General election 1802: Donegal
Party	Candidate	Votes	%	±%
Tory	Arthur Gore	Unopposed	N/A	N/A
	James Stewart	Unopposed	N/A	N/A

1801 co-option: Donegal
Party	Candidate	Votes	%	±%
	Henry Vaughan Brooke	Unopposed	N/A	N/A
Tory	Arthur Gore	Unopposed	N/A	N/A
