= David Morier Evans =

Welsh financial journalist (1819–1874)

David Morier Evans (1819–1874) was a Welsh financial journalist.

Evans, the son of Joshua Lloyd Evans of Llanidloes, Montgomeryshire, was born in 1819. He formed an early connection with journalism, and became assistant city correspondent on The Times, a post which he occupied several years, and left to assume the direction of the money articles in the Morning Herald and Standard.

He left the Standard at the end of 1872. In a court case of 1875 he was found to have been in the pay of corrupt company promoter Albert Grant while working at the Standard, dishonestly endorsing companies in which Grant had an interest to support the value of Grant's shareholdings. In March 1873 he started a paper called the Hour, on which he spent his entire means, being adjudicated a bankrupt 19 December 1873. His health broke down under the strain of his financial difficulties, and he died on the morning of 1 January 1874, aged 54. He was married, and left children. He was buried in Abney Park Cemetery, Stamford Hill, the funeral being attended by a large number of brother journalists among whom he was popular.

In addition to his regular work Evans was connected with several other commercial and financial periodicals, among them being the Bankers' Magazine, to which he was one of the principal contributors, the Bullionist, and the Stock Exchange Gazette. He also conducted the literary and statistical departments of the Bankers' Almanac and Diary.

He published several books, all bearing on or arising out of city affairs, chief among which were: The Commercial Crisis, 1847–8, History of the Commercial Crisis, 1857–8, and the Stock Exchange Panic, 1859, Facts, Failures, and Frauds: Revelations, Financial, Mercantile, and Criminal, 1859, Speculative Notes and Notes on Speculation Ideal and Real 1864, and City Men and City Manners, 1852.
