= Albert Grant (company promoter) =

Unseated conservative politician in 1874 for election offences

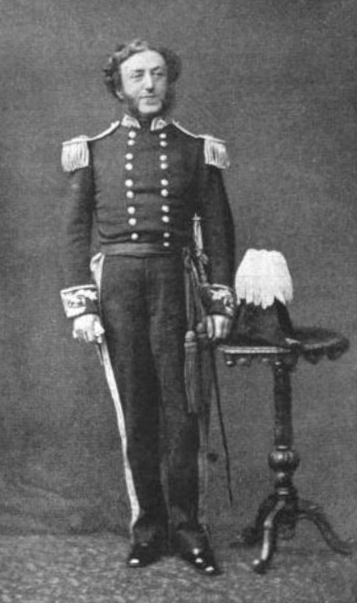

Albert Grant (18 November 1831 – 30 August 1899) (born Abraham Gottheimer); Baron Grant in the nobility of Italy, was an Irish-born British company promoter and Conservative politician, unseated in 1874 for election offences.

== Early life ==
Born in Dublin, Abraham was the son of Bernard Gottheimer, a poor Jewish pedlar from Central Europe. The family subsequently moved to London where his father became a partner in a business importing fancy goods. Abraham Gottheimer was educated in London and Paris, and assumed the name "Albert Grant" prior to his marriage to Emily Isabella Robinson in 1856. He entered employment as a clerk, later becoming a travelling salesman of wines.

== Company promotion ==
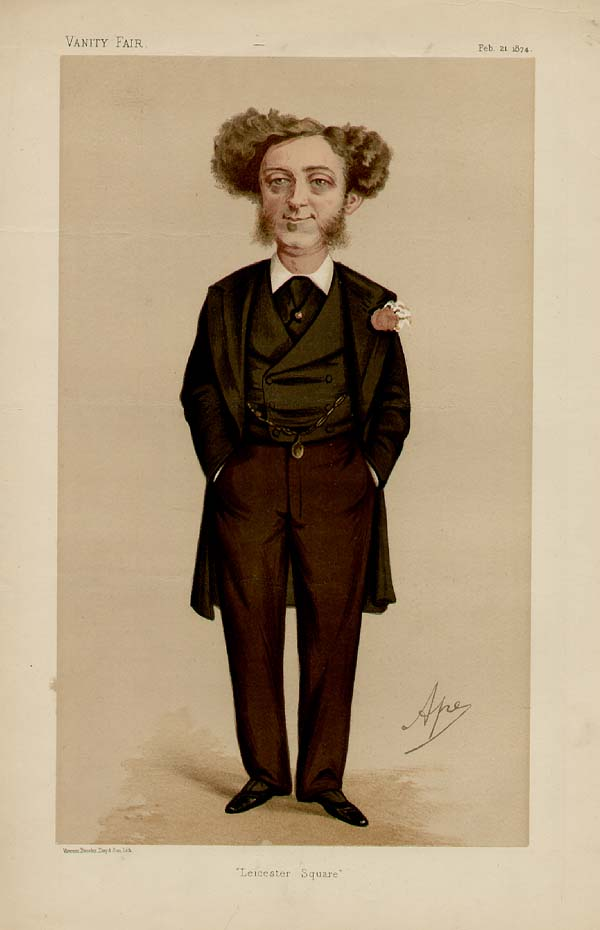
Vanity Fair caricature of Grant by Ape (published 21 February 1874)

In 1859 Grant established the first of a number of companies which were to fail at the expense of the shareholders. This was the Mercantile Discount Company which failed in 1861. In 1864 he established Crédit Foncier and Mobilier of England which was used as the vehicle to launch a number of ventures. Grant actively courted investors by using directories and targeting financially naive groups such as members of the clergy and widows. He established a number of companies between 1864 and 1872 each of which collapsed in controversial circumstances with allegations of fraud made against Grant.

In 1872 he financed construction of the North Wales Narrow Gauge Railways (Moel Tryfan Undertaking), the narrow gauge railway from Dinas, near Caernarfon, to Brygwyn and Rhyd Ddu. He put the railway company into receivership over a loan of £7,000 made towards preliminary expenses and secured on the General Undertaking in 1877 but in 1878 the company won its second appeal, with a ruling that the Moel Tryfan Undertaking was not liable for the debt and Grant lost the £7,000. He earned a 10% commission, £8,800, for placing the Moel Tryfan Undertaking's capital and debentures.

In a court case of 1875 Grant was shown to be in a corrupt relationship with the financial journalist Marmaduke Sampson, financial editor of the London Times: in "Rubery v. Grant", a libel action against Grant and Sampson, the plaintiff was awarded £500 from the second defendant, Sampson. Evidence was produced that Grant had paid the journalist thousands of pounds for favourable reports. The "humiliated" newspaper dismissed Sampson in January 1875. A second journalist, David Morier Evans of the Standard, was also in his pay.

In 1875, Grant bought The Echo, the London evening newspaper, but sold it after less than 12 months to John Passmore Edwards.

== Cooper's Hill ==
Grant built a mansion house at Cooper's Hill near Egham, Surrey, in c.1865, to a semi-Gothic design by F. & H. Francis. From 1872 until 1906, it housed the Royal Indian Engineering College.

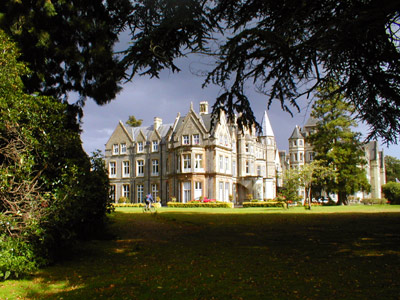
Cooper's Hill in 2004

== Member of Parliament 1865–1868 ==
In 1865 Grant was chosen as Conservative candidate for the parliamentary constituency of Kidderminster, in opposition to the sitting Liberal Member of Parliament (MP), Colonel Luke White. Voting in England was then by a show of hands at a hustings, and remained so until the Ballot Act 1872 introduced secret ballots. The election generated great interest as a letter had been sent to all members of the electorate denouncing Grant as "a fraudulent adventurer". Grant and White were nominated at Kidderminster Town Hall on 11 July in front of a huge crowd. Grant was proposed and seconded by two local carpet manufacturers, who dismissed the charges against him at length and read out a number of character references defending his reputation. Grant unseated White to become Kidderminster's MP when the poll was held two days later. Three years later another general election was held, but Grant did not stand. The seat was regained by the Liberals, with Thomas Lea becoming member of parliament.

== 1874 election ==
When a general election was called in 1874, Grant was once more the Conservative candidate at Kidderminster, and succeeded in winning the contest by 111 votes when the poll was held on 31 January. However, an election petition was lodged on 24 February by a number of local men. The petitioners alleged that Grant and his election agents were guilty of bribery, treating and undue influence and had made corrupt promises of "money, meat, drink and provision and other reward" to electors in exchange for their votes. They described how between 40 and 50 local public houses offered free drink to those wearing Conservative colours, and having their names entered on a list of Grant's supporters. Grant vigorously contested the petition, dismissing its promoters as a "clique". However, it was discovered that although his declared expenses were only 300 pounds, expenditure of more than £1,200 could be demonstrated. The petition came before the courts in July 1874, and the evidence against Grant was found by Mr Justice Mellor to be compelling: he was unseated and ordered to pay costs.

== Italian and Portuguese honours ==
In 1868 Victor Emmanuel II of Italy created Grant a hereditary baron. This was declared to be due to his services to the Galleria Vittorio Emanuele in Milan, although it was widely believed that the honour had been purchased. In 1872 Grant was made a Commander of the Portuguese Order of Christ, and similar allegations were made.

== Leicester Square ==
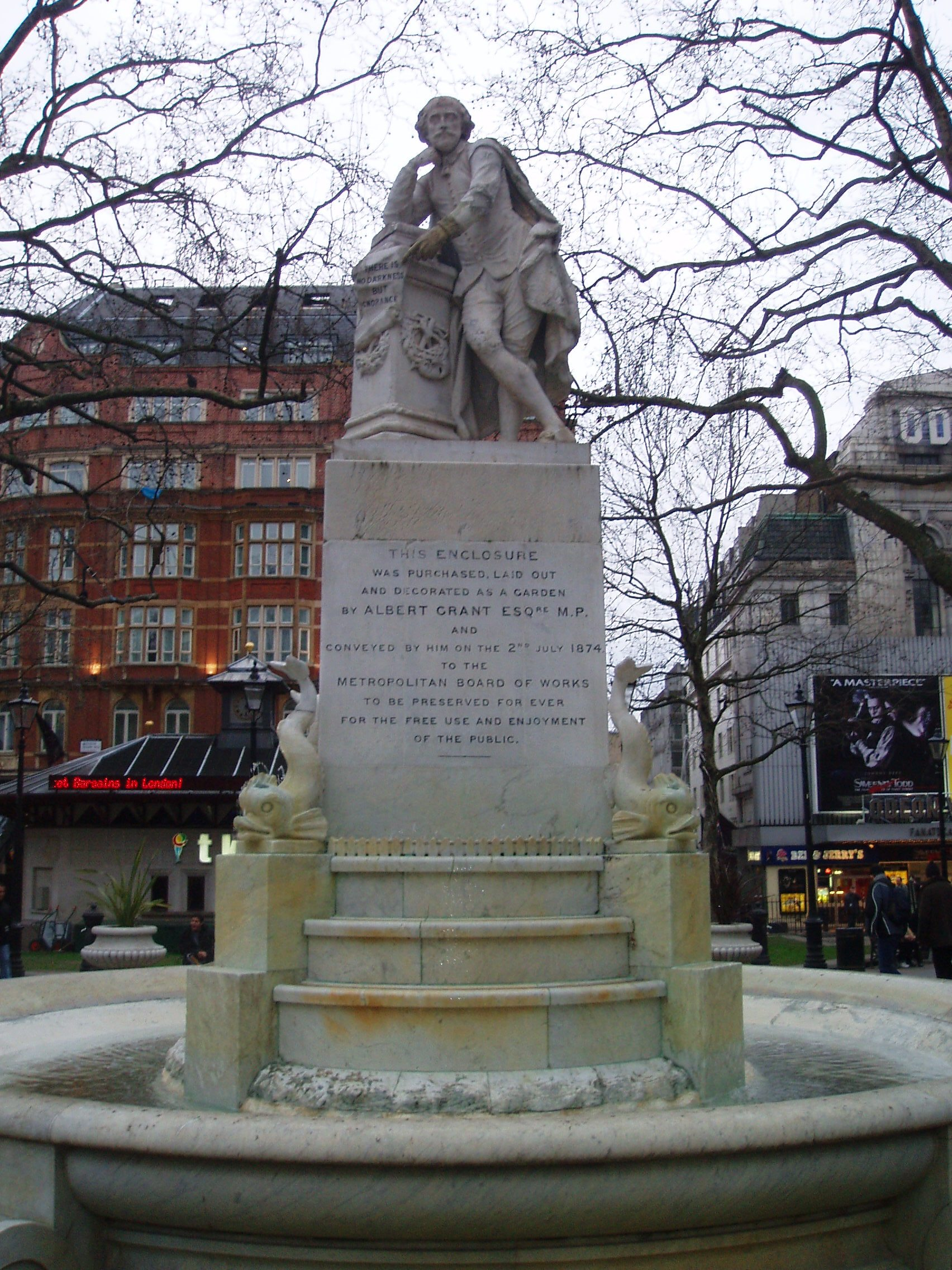
Statue of William Shakespeare, Leicester Square, bearing an inscription recording the gift by Grant

During 1873 the Metropolitan Board of Works had been attempting to acquire Leicester Square for use as a public gardens. In January 1874 they were unexpectedly informed that Grant had "for some months past been in negotiation with the owners for the purchase of the ground with a view to laying it out as a garden, and handing it over to the Board as a gift to the Metropolis". He purchased it for £11,060. The square was laid out at Grant's expense, and the deeds formally handed over to the board on 3 July 1874.

== Bankruptcy ==
From 1876 until his death, Grant was constantly being pursued by creditors in the courts. While most of his failing companies were British, he was involved in an international scandal involving the fraudulent sale of shares in the exhausted Emma Silver Mine at Alta, Utah. He was declared bankrupt in 1877, but attempted to regain his fortune by establishing a new bank in 1878. This failed, and he was again in the bankruptcy court in 1885. A third and final receiving order was made against him a few days before his death in 1899. A large house he had built for himself in Kensington was demolished in 1883, with the site sold. The marble staircase was acquired by Madame Tussaud's. Horstead Hall, Norfolk, which Grant had purchased from Baron Suffield, was also sold.

== Death ==
Grant spent his last years in relative poverty. He died of heart failure at Aldwick Place, Pagham, near Bognor, in Sussex in August 1899 aged 67.

Parliament of the United Kingdom
Preceded by Luke White	Member of Parliament for Kidderminster; 1865 – 1868	Succeeded by Thomas Lea
Preceded by Thomas Lea	Member of Parliament for Kidderminster; 1874	Succeeded by Sir William Fraser
