= Sir Thomas Lea, 1st Baronet =

British manufacturer and politician (1841–1902)

Thomas Lea

Member of Parliament for South Londonderry
- In office 1886–1900
- Preceded by: Tim Healy
- Succeeded by: John Gordon

Member of Parliament for County Donegal
- In office 15 December 1879 – 1885 Serving with: Marquess of Hamilton (1879–1880); John Kinnear (1880–1885)
- Preceded by: William Wilson
- Succeeded by: Constituency abolished

Member of Parliament for Kidderminster
- In office 1868–1874
- Preceded by: Albert Grant
- Succeeded by: Albert Grant

Personal details
- Born: 17 January 1841 The Larches, Worcestershire, England
- Died: 9 January 1902 (aged 60) Kidderminster, Worcestershire, England
- Party: Liberal; Liberal Unionist
- Spouse: Louisa Birch (m. 1864)
- Children: 3

Sir Thomas Lea, 1st Baronet (17 January 1841 – 9 January 1902) was an English carpet manufacturer from Kidderminster, and a Liberal Party politician.

== Family history ==
Thomas Lea was born at The Larches, near Kidderminster, in 1841, the eldest son of George Butcher Lea. He came from a family which had manufactured Kidderminster stuff and bombazine in the 17th and 18th centuries. His ancestor Francis Lea with son John Lea went over to carpet weaving in 1781. When Francis retired from this firm, he and his second son Thomas Lea set up a worsted spinning business in Callows Lane, Kidderminster. Francis' daughter married William Butcher, and their son George Butcher later joined the firm. In 1831 George formed the firm of Butcher, Worth and Holmes to manufacture carpets. In 1835 Thomas gave his spinning business to his nephew George Butcher, who later took the name George Butcher Lea.

George Butcher Lea withdrew from the carpet business in 1838, and his son Thomas grew up in the business and then took control of it. He then built Slingfield Mills at Kidderminster in 1864. He retired in favour of his sons (who formed a company) in 1892 (they later sold the company in 1920).

== Politics ==
Lea was chosen as the Liberal candidate for Kidderminster in 1868, only 27 years old, and won by a large margin. He held the seat until 1874, and later represented County Donegal from 1880 to 1885, and South Londonderry as a Liberal Unionist from 1886 to 1900. While in Ireland, Lea expressed hostility to the Irish language; he proposed an amendment to the draft of the second Home Rule Bill that would have prevented the passing of laws which would increase Irish language use in state schools, legal courts and other public spheres. He was a Justice of the Peace. In 1892, he was created a baronet, of The Larches in Kidderminster in the County of Worcester and of Sea Grove in Dawlish in the County of Devon.

== Family ==
Lea married, in 1864, Louisa Birch, daughter of William Birch, of Barton-under-Needwood, Staffordshire. They had two sons and a daughter. The eldest son, Sir Thomas Sydney Lea (1867–1946) succeeded as baronet, and was a barrister. The younger son, Rev. Percy Lea, was a priest.

Lea died at Kidderminster on 9 January 1902, aged 60.

Parliament of the United Kingdom
Preceded by Albert Grant	Member of Parliament for Kidderminster; 1868–1874	Succeeded by Albert Grant
Preceded by Marquess of Hamilton; William Wilson	Member of Parliament for County Donegal; 1879 – 1885; With: Marquess of Hamilton 1879–1880; John Kinnear 1880–1885	Constituency abolished
Preceded by Tim Healy	Member of Parliament for County Londonderry South; 1886 – 1900	Succeeded by John Gordon
Baronetage of the United Kingdom
New creation	Baronet (of The Larches and Sea Grove); 1892–1902	Succeeded by Thomas Sydney Lea
