= Lord Arthur Hamilton =

British Army officer and courtier

- Born: 20 August 1883
- Died: 6 November 1914 (aged 31); Ypres, Belgium
- Father: James Hamilton
- Relatives: James Hamilton (brother); Claud Hamilton (brother)
- Military career
- Service: British Army
- Rank: Captain
- Unit: Royal Scots
- Wars: World War I

Captain Lord Arthur John Hamilton (20 August 1883 – 6 November 1914) was a British Army officer and courtier, who briefly served as Deputy Master of the Household.

Hamilton was the son of James Hamilton, 2nd Duke of Abercorn and Lady Mary Anna Curzon. He commissioned into the Royal Scots on 20 April 1901. He later transferred to the Irish Guards joining the 1st Battalion of the regiment. On 3 March 1913 he was promoted to captain, and two days later he was appointed Deputy Master of the Household in the household of George V.

He was deployed to France with his battalion, part of the British Expeditionary Force, in August 1914. Hamilton was killed on 6 November 1914 during the First Battle of Ypres. He is commemorated on the Menin Gate. Hamilton was unmarried at the time of his death.
