= Thomas Conolly (1823–1876) =

Irish politician

- Born: 23 February 1823
- Died: 10 August 1876[
- Citizenship: Ireland

Thomas Conolly (23 February 1823 – 10 August 1876) was an Irish Conservative Party politician. He was son of Edward Michael Conolly. He was a Member of Parliament (MP) for County Donegal from 1849 until his death in 1876, aged 53. The Conolly summer residence Cliff House on the banks of the River Erne between Belleek, County Fermanagh, and Ballyshannon, County Donegal, was demolished as part of the Erne Hydroelectric scheme, which constructed the Cliff and Cathaleen's Fall hydroelectric power stations. Cliff hydroelectric power station was constructed on the site of Cliff House and was commissioned in 1950.

Parliament of the United Kingdom
Preceded by Edward Michael Conolly; Sir Edmund Hayes, Bt	Member of Parliament for County Donegal; 1849–1876; With: Sir Edmund Hayes, Bt	Succeeded by Sir Edmund Hayes, Bt; William Wilson
