= Addis's Single Rail Tramway =

Monorail system

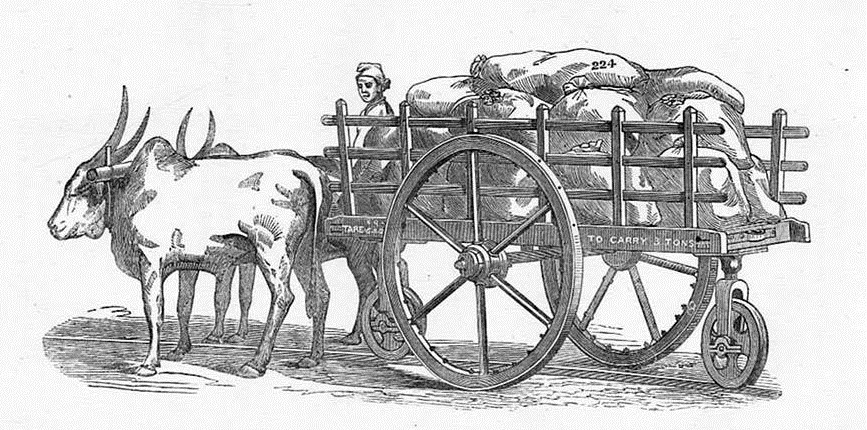
Addis' Single Rail tramway in Roorkee Treatise on Civil Engineering in India, 1877

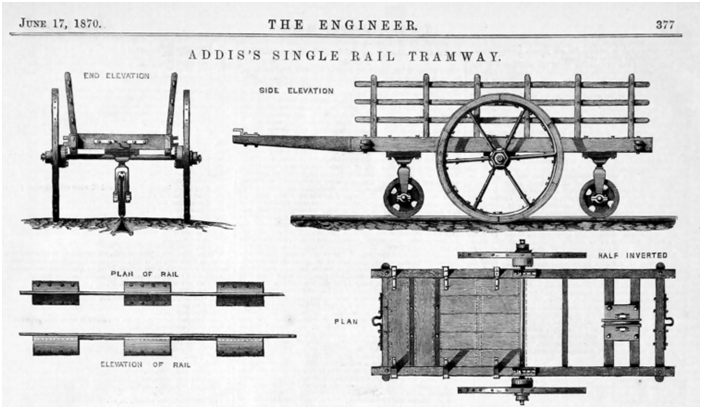
Addis's Single Rail Tramway, illustration from The Engineer, 17 June 1870, page 377

The Addis's Single Rail Tramway was a patented monorail system invented in 1869 by William Judson Addis.

== History ==
William Judson Addis from Thane (previously Tanna) in India invented, patented and developed a tramway with a single rail, on which a bullock cart ran with two double flanged wheels, which could take all, or nearly all, the weight, and two ordinary stabilising wheels, which served to prevent over-turning. A cart, loaded with three tons, could easily be drawn by two bullocks.

Addis was granted his first patent in 1869, and in 1870 a further patent was granted concerning improvements to the track system. The investment cost for sleepers and rails was less than 50% of an ordinary narrow gauge railway.

The monorails were laid at the sides of an existing road, one for up traffic and the other for down traffic, leaving the centre part of the road for ordinary traffic. The rails protruded only 1 1/2–2 in (38–51 mm) above the surface of the road to limit the interferences with the ordinary road traffic. The cost of tramway was claimed to be Rs 4,000-5,000 per mile.

For demonstrating the advantages, Mr. Addis has laid down a length of rail in the grounds of his ironworks at Thane, upon which he has placed two carts or wagons specially constructed by him for the tramway. A portion of the rail was laid at an incline of 1 in 40, and another portion, on level ground, described a 10 ft (3.0 m) radius curve. This experimental line has been visited by many government officials and others, who have seen with satisfaction the ease with which a pair of bullocks drew three tons along the tramway.

The flanged centre wheels were attached to a screw, by which the framework of the cart could be raised, so that on level ground the ordinary side wheels were set to be 1–2 in (25–51 mm) above the surface of the road, and the entire weight of the burden rested on the rail. The side wheels touched the ground only occasionally, but the main weight was borne by the centre wheels, resulting in very low friction. In some experiments, a large log of wood was placed on the ground, over which one of the side wheels would pass without derailing. When a small hole was dug in the line of a side wheel, this could also be passed without an accident.

A line was laid between Kalyan and Kalyan Bunder over a distance of 1 1/4 mi (2.0 km) to transport salt. A 3 1/2 mi (5.6 km) long double line was planned to be built between Mhyjee station of the Great Indian Peninsula Railway (GIPR) and the Mhyjee fair ground, also known as Maheji or Chinchkhed.
