= Parliamentary Under-Secretary of State for Northern Ireland =

The office of Parliamentary Under-Secretary of State for Northern Ireland is a junior ministerial position in the Northern Ireland Office of the Government of the United Kingdom. The role has also been known as Under-Secretary of State, Northern Ireland.

== Responsibilities ==
The parliamentary under-secretary of state leads on supporting the secretary of state in their responsibilities, specifically:

- Supporting the secretary of state on legacy, New Decade, New Approach and Protocol.
- Reviewing planning for future political negotiations and developing plans to help achieve greater levels of Integrated Education in Northern Ireland.
- Leading the department’s work on Constitution and Rights such as abortion and ensuring women have access to services.
- Responsible for legislation and engagement in the House of Lords.
- Aiding political stability such as reviewing plans for the 25th Anniversary of the Good Friday Agreement.
- Building substantive relationships across sectors and communities through engagement.

== List of ministers ==
Parliamentary Under-Secretary of State for Northern Ireland
Name	Image	Start date	End date	Party
David Howell MP for Guildford		26 March 1972	5 November 1972	Conservative
Peter Mills MP for Torrington		5 November 1972	4 March 1974	Conservative
John Ganzoni 2nd Baron Belstead (Hereditary Peer)		5 June 1973	4 March 1974	Conservative
Jack Donaldson Baron Donaldson of Kingsbridge (Life Peer)		4 March 1974	5 April 1976	Labour
Don Concannon MP for Mansfield		27 June 1974	5 April 1976	Labour
James Dunn MP for Liverpool Kirkdale		5 April 1976	4 May 1979	Labour
Raymond Carter MP for Birmingham Northfield		5 April 1976	4 May 1979	Labour
Tom Pendry MP for Stalybridge and Hyde		11 November 1978	4 May 1979	Labour
Philip Goodhart MP for Beckenham		4 May 1979	5 January 1981	Conservative
Rodney Elton 2nd Baron Elton (Hereditary Peer)		7 May 1979	15 September 1981	Conservative
Giles Shaw MP for Pudsey		7 May 1979	5 January 1981	Conservative
John Patten MP for Oxford		5 January 1981	13 June 1983	Conservative
David Mitchell MP for Basingstoke		5 January 1981	13 June 1983	Conservative
Nicholas Scott MP for Paddington South		13 June 1983	11 September 1986	Conservative
Chris Patten MP for Bath		14 June 1983	2 September 1985	Conservative
Charles Lyell 3rd Baron Lyell (Hereditary Peer)		12 April 1984	25 July 1989	Conservative
Richard Needham MP for North Wiltshire		3 September 1985	15 April 1992	Conservative
Peter Viggers MP for Gosport		June 1987	26 July 1989	Conservative
Peter Bottomley MP for Eltham		4 July 1989	28 July 1990	Conservative
Roger Bootle-Wilbraham 7th Baron Skelmersdale (Hereditary Peer)		24 July 1989	28 November 1990	Conservative
Jeremy Hanley MP for Richmond and Barnes		3 December 1990	27 May 1993	Conservative
Arthur Gore, 9th Earl of Arran 9th Earl of Arran (Hereditary Peer)		22 April 1992	11 January 1994	Conservative
Michael Ancram MP for Devizes		27 May 1993	11 January 1994	Conservative
Tim Smith MP for Beaconsfield		6 January 1994	20 October 1994	Conservative
Jean Denton Baroness Denton of Wakefield (Life Peer)		20 July 1994	2 May 1997	Conservative
Malcolm Moss MP for North East Cambridgeshire		25 October 1994	2 May 1997	Conservative
Alf Dubs Baron Dubs of Battersea (Life Peer)		6 May 1997	31 December 1999	Labour
George Howarth MP for Knowsley North and Sefton East		29 July 1999	7 June 2001	Labour
Des Browne MP for Kilmarnock and Loudoun		11 June 2001	13 June 2003	Labour
Barry Gardiner MP for Brent North		2 April 2004	10 May 2005	Labour
Parliamentary Under-Secretary of State for Children in Northern Ireland
Jeff Rooker Baron Rooker of Perry Barr (Life Peer)		9 May 2005	6 May 2006	Labour
Maria Eagle MP for Liverpool Garston		6 May 2006	28 June 2007	Labour
Position not in use		28 June 2007	11 May 2015	Position not in use
Parliamentary Under-Secretary of State for Northern Ireland
Andrew Dunlop Baron Dunlop of Helensburgh (Life Peer)		11 May 2015	10 June 2017	Conservative
Nick Bourne Baron Bourne of Aberystwyth (Life Peer)		14 June 2017	27 October 2017	Conservative
Chloe Smith MP for Norwich North		14 June 2017	9 January 2018	Conservative
Ian Duncan Baron Duncan of Springbank (Life Peer)		27 October 2017	13 February 2020	Conservative
Robin Walker MP for Worcester		25 July 2019	13 February 2020	Conservative
Position not in use		13 February 2020	5 November 2021	Position not in use
Jonathan Caine Baron Caine of Temple Newsam (Life Peer)		5 November 2021	5 July 2024	Conservative
Fleur Anderson; MP for Putney		9 July 2024	7 September 2025	Labour
Matthew Patrick; MP for Wirral West		7 September 2025	22 July 2026	Labour
Sarah Owen; MP for Luton North		22 July 2026	Incumbent	Labour
Ruth Anderson Baroness Anderson of Stoke-on-Trent (Life Peer)		22 July 2026	Incumbent	Labour
