= Arthur Gore, 8th Earl of Arran =

British politician and columnist (1910–1983)

The Right Honourable The Earl of Arran

Personal details
- Born: Arthur Kattendyke Strange David Archibald Gore; 5 July 1910 Bishop's Stortford, Hertfordshire, England
- Died: 23 February 1983 (aged 72) Watford, Hertfordshire, England
- Resting place: Luss Parish Church Cemetery, Luss, Argyll and Bute, Scotland
- Spouse: Fiona Colquhoun (m. 1937)
- Children: Arthur Gore, 9th Earl of Arran; Hon. Philip Gore
- Parent(s): Arthur Gore, 6th Earl of Arran; Maud van Kattendyke
- Education: Eton College
- Alma mater: Balliol College, Oxford

Arthur Kattendyke Strange David Archibald Gore, 8th Earl of Arran (5 July 1910 – 23 February 1983), styled Lord Arran, was a British columnist and politician who served as the Conservative whip in the House of Lords. He is known for leading the effort in the House of Lords to decriminalise male homosexuality in 1967.

== Early life and education ==
Arran was the second son of the 6th Earl of Arran and Maud Jacqueline Marie Beauclerk, only daughter of the 3rd Baron Huyssen van Kattendyke of Kattendijke, Zeeland, the Netherlands. He was affectionately known as "Boofy".

He was educated at Eton and Balliol College, Oxford.

== Career ==
During the Second World War, Gore worked first as a press attaché at the British Legion in Bern (1939–45) and at the British Embassy in Lisbon (1941–42). He was deputy director of the overseas general division of the Ministry of Information (1943–45) and was secretariat director at the Central Office of Information (1945–49).

In December 1958, on the death of his elder bachelor brother, the 7th Earl of Arran (known for almost all of his life as Viscount Sudley), only nine days after their father's death, Gore succeeded to the title, and became an active member of the House of Lords.

His brother had been homosexual, and Lord Arran was the sponsor in the House of Lords of Labour MP Leo Abse's 1967 private member's bill which, as the Sexual Offences Act 1967, decriminalised homosexual acts between two consenting adult men. He was of the opinion that "no amount of legislation will prevent homosexuals from being the subject of dislike and derision, or at best of pity". He also sponsored a bill for the protection of badgers, and was once asked why this effort had failed whereas decriminalising homosexuality had succeeded. Arran is reported to have replied: "There are not many badgers in the House of Lords."

He was an outspoken columnist for many years, writing for The Evening Standard, The Guardian, Encounter, Punch, The Observer, The Daily Mail, and others. At one point he described himself as "a poor man's Duke of Bedford and a rich man's Godfrey Winn". His columns, which often contained inflammatory and abusive language, were tagged as coming from "The outrageous Arran, the Earl you love to hate." As an example, he once wrote of the Irish, in the Evening Standard in October 1974: "I loathe and detest the miserable bastards [...], savage murderous thugs. May the Irish, all of them, rot in Hell".

== Marriage and issue ==
He married Fiona Bryde Colquhoun (1918–2013), eldest daughter of Sir Iain Colquhoun, 7th Baronet. She was a speedboat racer and, like her husband, an animal rights activist. The couple had homes in Hertfordshire and Scotland. The Countess was responsible for the introduction of wallabies to the island of Inchconnachan on Loch Lomond in Scotland.

They had two sons:

- Arthur, Viscount Sudley (born 1938), who succeeded his father as 9th Earl of Arran
- Hon. Philip Gore (1943–1975)

Lord Arran died at his home near Hemel Hempstead, aged 72.

== Popular culture ==
Lord Arran was portrayed by David Bamber in the 2018 BBC limited television series A Very English Scandal.

Peerage of Ireland
| Preceded by Arthur Paul John Charles Gore | Earl of Arran; 1958–1983 | Succeeded by Arthur Colum Michael Connolly-Gore |
