= General Wilkinson (disambiguation) =

James Wilkinson (1757–1825) was a U.S. Army general. General Wilkinson may also refer to:

- Frederick Green Wilkinson (1825–1913), British Army lieutenant general
- Henry Clement Wilkinson (1837–1908), British Army lieutenant general
- Percival Spearman Wilkinson (1865–1953), British Army major general
- W. Wilkinson (fl. 1810s), British Army major general

== See also ==
- Attorney General Wilkinson (disambiguation)
