= Arthur Gore, 5th Earl of Arran =

Anglo-Irish peer and diplomat (1839–1901)

The Right Honourable The Earl of Arran KP DL
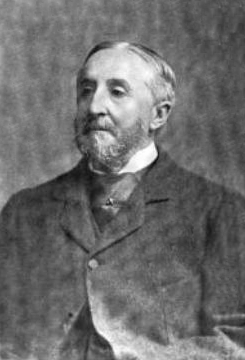

Lord Lieutenant of County Mayo
- In office 1889–1901
- Preceded by: The Earl of Lucan
- Succeeded by: The Earl of Lucan

Personal details
- Born: Arthur Saunders William Charles Fox Gore; 6 January 1839 Bath, Somerset, England
- Died: 14 March 1901 (aged 62) Mayfair, London, England
- Spouses: Edith Elizabeth Henrietta Jocelyn (m. 1865; died 1871) Winifred Ellen Reilly (m. 1889)
- Children: Lady Mabell Gore; Lady Cicely Gore; Arthur Gore, 6th Earl of Arran; Lady Esther Gore
- Parent(s): Philip Yorke Gore, 4th Earl of Arran; Elizabeth Marianne Napier
- Education: Eton College
- Occupation: Diplomat

Arthur Saunders William Charles Fox Gore, 5th Earl of Arran, KP, DL (6 January 1839 – 14 March 1901), styled Viscount Sudley from 1839 to 1884, was an Anglo-Irish peer and diplomat.

== Early life ==
Arran was the eldest son of Philip Yorke Gore, 4th Earl of Arran, and Elizabeth Marianne Napier, daughter of General Sir William Francis Patrick Napier, KCB. His mother was doubly descended from the 2nd Duke of Richmond, a grandson of Charles II. He was educated at Eton College, and subsequently entered the diplomatic service.

== Diplomatic and public career ==
He was appointed High Sheriff of Donegal in 1863. He was an Attaché at the British embassies in Hanover, Stuttgart, Lisbon and Paris as well as a Special Commissioner for Income Tax from 1865 to 1881 and a Commissioner of Customs from 1883 to 1884. In 1884 he succeeded his father as fifth Earl of Arran but as this was an Irish peerage it did not entitle him to a seat in the House of Lords. However, later the same year, he was created Baron Sudley of Castle Gore in the County of Mayo, in the Peerage of the United Kingdom, which gave him an automatic seat in the upper chamber of Parliament. He later served as Lord Lieutenant of County Mayo from 1889 to 1901 and was made a Knight of the Order of St Patrick in 1898.

== Family ==
Lord Arran married, firstly in 1865, Honourable Edith Elizabeth Henrietta Jocelyn (1845–1871), daughter of Robert Jocelyn, Viscount Jocelyn. They had one son and three daughters before she died early in 1871. Among the children were:

- Lady Mabell Frances Elizabeth Gore (1866–1956), married David Ogilvy, 11th Earl of Airlie on 19 January 1886, and had issue
- Lady Cicely Alice Gore (1867–1955), married James Gascoyne-Cecil, 4th Marquess of Salisbury on 17 May 1887, and had issue
- Arthur Gore, 6th Earl of Arran (1868–1958), married Mathilde van Kattendijke on 16 August 1902, and had issue; remarried Lilian Quick on 17 December 1929.
- Lady Esther Georgiana Caroline Gore (1870–1955), married Frederick Smith, 2nd Viscount Hambleden on 26 July 1894, and had issue

Twenty years after his first wife's death, Lord Arran remarried, in 1889, Winifred Ellen Reilly, daughter of John Reilly, and widow of the Hon. John Montagu Stopford. She was formerly a lady-in-waiting to Princess Christian of Schleswig-Holstein. They had one daughter:

- Lady Winifred Helene Lettice Gore (1891–1958)

Lord Arran died at his home in Mayfair on 14 March 1901, aged 62, and was succeeded in his titles by his only son Arthur. Lady Arran died in 1921.

Honorary titles
Preceded by The 3rd Earl of Lucan	Lord Lieutenant of Mayo; 1889–1901	Succeeded by The 4th Earl of Lucan
Peerage of Ireland
Preceded by Philip Yorke Gore	Earl of Arran; 1884–1901	Succeeded by Arthur Jocelyn Charles Gore
Peerage of the United Kingdom
New creation	Baron Sudley; 1884–1901	Succeeded by Arthur Jocelyn Charles Gore
