= Ardagh, County Mayo =

Civil parish and townland in County Mayo, Ireland

Ardagh
- Civil parish
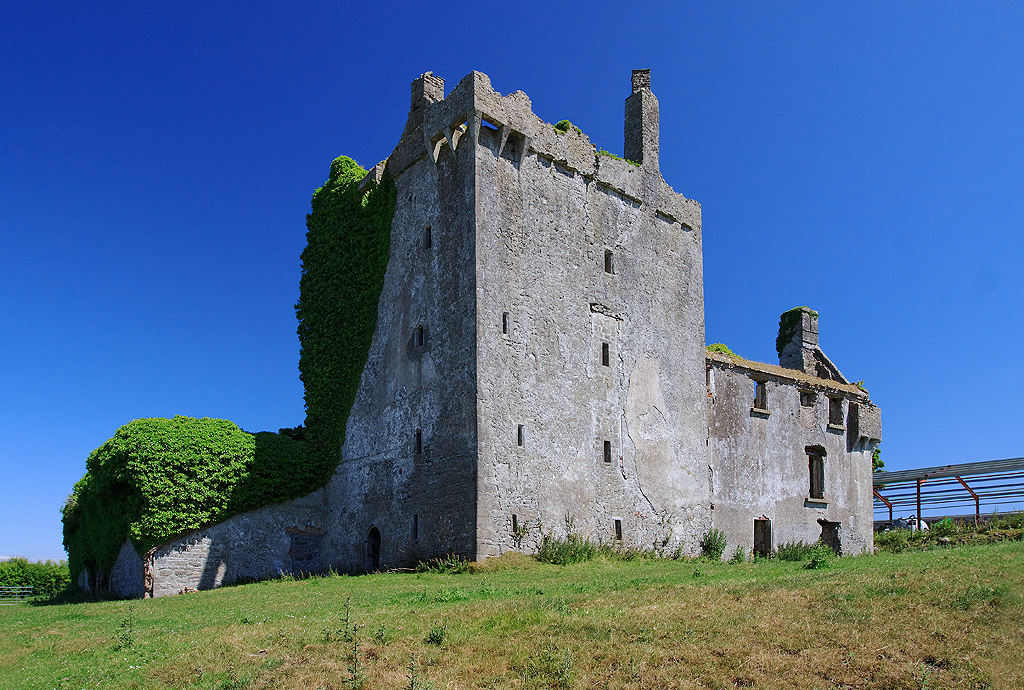
- Deel Castle is a fortified tower house beside the River Deel in the civil parish of Ardagh
- Interactive map of Ardagh
- Coordinates: 54°05′52″N 9°13′32″W
- Country: Ireland
- County: Mayo

Ardagh (Irish: Ardach) is a civil parish and townland in County Mayo, located slightly to the southwest of Ballina.

The parish takes its name from an ancient ecclesiastical site, which was either a church or a small monastery, and is derived from "Ard Achadh", which means high ground. The earliest record of the first church in Ardagh is in an 1198 epistle issued by Pope Innocent 3rd. The parish contains two castles: Deel Castle and Rappa Castle. There is also a community centre, a Gaelic football pitch, three national schools, and a pub.
