= Arthur Gore, 6th Earl of Arran =

Anglo-Irish peer and soldier

The Right Honourable The Earl of Arran KP KStJ PC JP DL
- Lord Arran in 1938
- Born: Arthur Jocelyn Charles Gore; 14 September 1868; Ayot St Peter, Hertfordshire, England
- Died: 19 December 1958 (aged 90); Truro, Cornwall, England
- Occupations: Peer, soldier
- Spouses: Maud van Kattendyke (m. 1902; died 1927) Lillian Quick (m. 1929)
- Children: Arthur Gore, 7th Earl of Arran; Arthur Gore, 8th Earl of Arran
- Parent(s): Arthur Gore, 5th Earl of Arran; Lady Edith Jocelyn

Arthur Jocelyn Charles Gore, 6th Earl of Arran, KP KStJ PC JP DL (14 September 1868 – 19 December 1958), known as Viscount Sudley from 1884 to 1901, was an Anglo-Irish peer and soldier.

== Biography ==
Lord Arran was born in Ayot St Peter, Hertfordshire, the only son of Arthur Saunders Gore, 5th Earl of Arran, and Lady Edith Elizabeth Henrietta Jocelyn, daughter of Robert Jocelyn, Viscount Jocelyn, the eldest son of Robert Jocelyn, 3rd Earl of Roden.

He was commissioned as a second lieutenant in the 3rd (Royal Berkshire Militia) Battalion, Royal Berkshire Regiment, on 14 May 1887 and was promoted to lieutenant on 17 November 1888. He then transferred from the part-time Militia to the Regular Army, becoming a second lieutenant in the Royal Horse Guards on 20 November 1889, promoted to lieutenant on 13 April 1892, and to captain on 30 March 1895. Following the outbreak of the Second Boer War in late 1899, he joined the Household Cavalry Composite Regiment for service in the war. He sailed for South Africa in the SS Narrung in early February 1900, and was the commanding officer in charge of the various cavalry drafts on board the ship, a total of 200 men. For his service in the war, he was promoted a brevet major in November 1900. He later fought in the First World War and achieved the rank of lieutenant-colonel.

He was a Justice of the Peace for Hertfordshire, County Louth and County Mayo, a Deputy Lieutenant of County Mayo and Essex and served as Lord Lieutenant of County Donegal from 1917 to 1920. He was made a Knight of the Order of St Patrick in 1909 and admitted to the Irish Privy Council in 1917.

== Family ==
Lord Arran married, firstly, at Hambleden church on 16 August 1902, Maud Jacqueline Marie Beauclerk van Kattendyke, daughter of Huyssen van Kattendyke, 3rd Baron van Kattendyke, of The Hague. They had two sons:

- Arthur Gore, 7th Earl of Arran (1903–1958), died nine days after succeeding to the title. His curious death led to false accounts that it was a suicide; however, he died of a brain haemorrhage.
- Arthur Strange Kattendyke David Archibald Gore, 8th Earl of Arran (1910–1983) he married Fiona Colquhoun on 11 June 1937. They have two sons:
  - Arthur Gore, 9th Earl of Arran (born 14 July 1938) he married Eleanor van Cutsem on 28 September 1974. They have two daughters.
  - The Honorable Philip Gore (born 22 March 1943)

After her death in 1927 he married, secondly, Lilian Constance Quick, daughter of Joseph Quick, in 1929.

Lord Arran died on 19 December 1958, aged 90, and was succeeded in his titles by his eldest son Arthur. Lilian, Lady Arran, died in 1961.

Honorary titles
| Preceded by Sir John Olphert | Lord Lieutenant of County Donegal; 1917–1920 | Succeeded by Sir Emerson Crawford Herdman |
Peerage of Ireland
| Preceded by Arthur Saunders Gore | Earl of Arran; 1901–1958 | Succeeded by Arthur Paul John Charles Gore |
