= Francis Charles Gore =

British barrister and public servant

Sir Francis Gore

Solicitor to the Board of Inland Revenue
- In office 1894–1911
- Monarchs: Queen Victoria; Edward VII
- Preceded by: Sir William Melville
- Succeeded by: Hugh Bertram Cox

Personal details
- Born: Francis Charles Gore; 19 May 1846 Hendon, London, England
- Died: 12 February 1940 (aged 93) South Kensington, London
- Spouse: Constance Mary Bruce (m. 1879; died 1925)
- Children: 4
- Parents: Hon. Charles Gore (father); Augusta, Countess of Kerry (mother)
- Relatives: 4th Earl of Bessborough (grandfather); 6th Earl of Bessborough (uncle); 4th Earl of Arran (uncle); Spencer Gore (brother); Rev. Charles Gore (brother); Freddie Gore (nephew); Gen. Robert Bruce (father-in-law); 4th Earl of Powis (nephew)
- Education: Harrow School
- Profession: Barrister
- Awards: Knight Bachelor; Knight Commander of the Order of the Bath

Sir Francis Charles Gore KCB JP (19 May 1846 – 12 February 1940) was a British barrister and public servant from the Anglo-Irish aristocratic Gore family. He was solicitor to the Board of Inland Revenue from 1894–1911.

== Early life, family, and education ==
Gore was born in Hendon into the wealthy and influential Anglo-Irish Gore family, the eldest of five children born to the Hon. Charles Alexander Gore and Augusta, Countess of Kerry.

His mother, born Lady Augusta Lavinia Priscilla Ponsonby, the second daughter of Home Secretary John Ponsonby, 4th Earl of Bessborough. She was the widow of William Petty-FitzMaurice, Earl of Kerry, who was son and heir of the third Marquess of Landsdowne before his unexpected death in 1836, aged 25, of a heart ailment.

His father, a public servant, was the grandson of the second Earl of Arran and younger brother of the fourth earl. He was the Commissioner of Woods and Forests from 1839–51 and Commissioner of Woods, Forests and Land Revenues from 1851–85.

The family resided in Wimbledon, London, and practised Low Church Anglicanism.

His younger brothers were the sportsman Spencer Gore, the first winner of the Wimbledon Championships (father of the artist Freddie Gore) and the theologian Rev. Charles Gore, Bishop of Worcester, Birmingham and Oxford, who joined the high church tradition and became an influential theologian.

His elder half-sister by his mother's first marriage, Lady Mary Caroline Louisa Thomas Petty-FitzMaurice, married Sir Percy Egerton Herbert and was the mother of the fourth Earl of Powis. His younger sisters were Caroline Maria Lascelles, who married Lt.-Col. Henry Arthur Lascelles, grandson of 2nd Earl of Harewood, and was the mother of Sir Francis William Lascelles; and Emily Caroline Augusta Gore, who was unmarried.

Gore was called by The Times a "true product of the great Victorian age". He attended the 1851 Great Exhibition at Hyde Park, the first world exposition of industrialisation, when he was 5 years old. His family connections allowed him to see the Duke of Wellington and stay in Paris with Charles, Comte de Flahaut (the father-in-law of the Marquess of Landsdowne, brother of his mother's first husband).

He was a keen cricketer and one of the earliest members of the I Zingari club, which was co-founded in 1845 by his uncle Hon. Frederick Ponsonby.

He was educated at Harrow School.

== Career ==
Gore studied at the Inns of Court and in 1870 was called to the bar by the Inner Temple.

He practised in circuit courts and build a substantial practice over the next two decades. From 1892 to 1894, he was recorder of Canterbury. He was appointed Solicitor to the Board of Inland Revenue in 1894, the same year that Sir William Harcourt's Finance Act brought a radical overhaul of the system of inheritance taxes. He held the office until 1911 when he reached the age limit of 65.

During the First World War, following the Military Service Act 1916, Gore was an active member of the Military Service Tribunals, hearing applications for exemption from conscription.

He served as judicial chairman of Hampshire Court of Quarter Sessions until he was 82.

Gore was knighted by King Edward VII on 13 July 1903 at Buckingham Palace. He was appointed a Knight Commander of the Order of the Bath in the 1911 Coronation Honours, upon his retirement from the Board of Inland Revenue.

== Personal life ==
In 1879, Gore married Constance Mary Bruce (died 1925), daughter of Gen. Robert Bruce of Glendouglie, younger brother of Lord Aberdare. They had three sons and a daughter.

- Arthur Charles Gore (18 July 1880 – 17 April 1963), emigrated to the United States
- Maj. Charles Henry Gore OBE (28 November 1881 – 20 June 1941), married as his second wife Hon. Violet Annesley, daughter of Arthur Annesley, 11th Viscount Valentia
- Evelyn Mary Gore (22 June 1883 – 5 June 1951)
- Capt. John Francis Gore CVO TD (15 May 1885 – 24 July 1983), barrister and author; married Lady Helena Campbell, daughter of Hugh Campbell, 4th Earl Cawdor

Sir Francis died in 1940 at his house, 61 Onslow Square, South Kensington, aged 93.
