= Fiona Gore, Countess of Arran =

Scottish noblewoman and powerboating racer

Fiona, Countess of Arran

Fiona Bryde Gore, Countess of Arran (née Colquhoun; 20 July 1918 – 16 May 2013), was a Scottish powerboat racer and recipient of the 1980 Segrave Trophy for the fastest woman on water.

== Career ==
Arran was introduced to powerboats when she was a passenger in Miss England III in its trial runs on Loch Lomond. In 1980, Lady Arran became the fastest woman on water, reaching a speed of 102 mph (164 km/h) in a powerboat on Lake Windemere. For this, she won the 1980 Segrave Trophy.

== Personal life ==
Fiona Colquhoun was born to Geraldine Bryde Tennant and Sir Iain Colquhoun, 7th Baronet. In 1937, she married the Hon. Arthur Gore, who in 1958 succeeded his brother as the 8th Earl of Arran.

They had two sons:

- Arthur, Viscount Sudley (born 1938), who succeeded his father as 9th Earl of Arran
- Hon. Philip Gore (1943–1975)

Red-necked Wallabies were introduced by the then Fiona Gore in the 1940s to Inchconnachan, an island in Loch Lomond in Scotland, and still roam wild. It is one of the very few places outside Australia which has a viable population of wallabies.

Lord Arran died on 23 February 1983, aged 72. Lady Arran died 16 May 2013, aged 94.

== See also ==
- Lady Violet Aitken, powerboat racer
