= Sir Iain Colquhoun, 7th Baronet =

Scottish landowner and soldier (1887–1948)

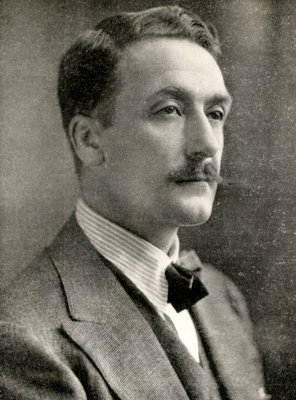
Portrait of Sir Iain Colquhoun, 7th Baronet.

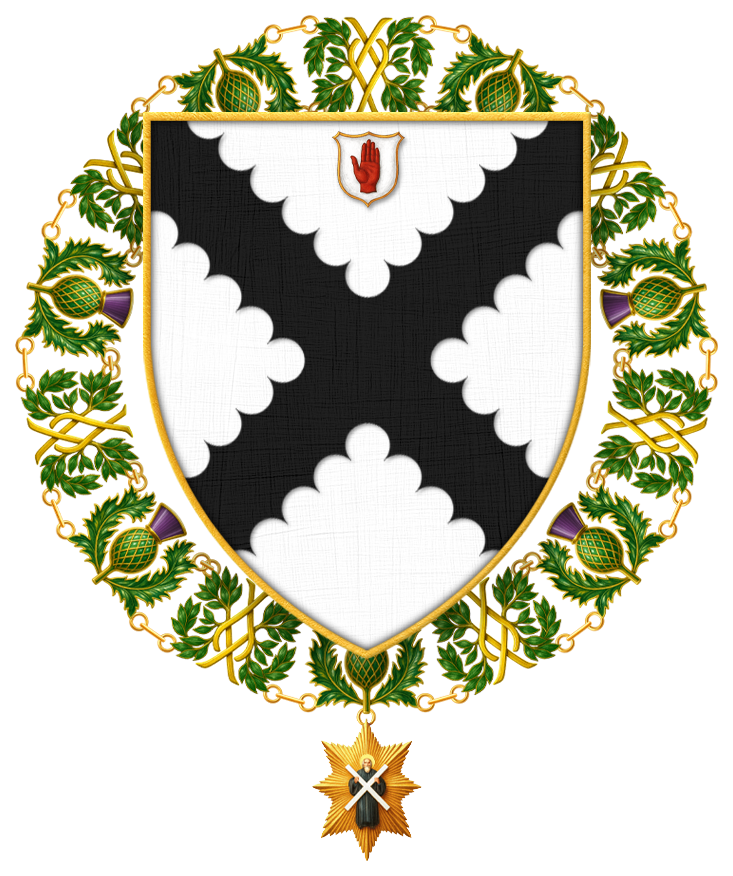
Shield of Arms of Sir Iain Colquhoun, 7th Baronet, 29th Laird of Luss, KT, encircled by the collar of the Order of the Thistle.

Sir Iain Colquhoun, 7th Baronet, 29th Laird of Luss, KT, DSO & Bar, FRSE (20 June 1887 – 12 November 1948), was a Scottish landowner and British Army soldier during the First World War.

== Military career ==
During the First World War, Colquhoun served in the Scots Guards. In 1914, the opposing troops on the Western Front had unofficially observed a Christmas truce. The following year, however, when the 28-year-old Captain Colquhoun agreed to a German officer's request for a short truce on Christmas Day, lasting about an hour, he was brought before a court-martial. He was defended by Raymond Asquith, son of Prime Minister H. H. Asquith (the Prime Minister was Colquhoun's wife's uncle). On 17 January 1916, he was found guilty after a five-hour trial, but received the lightest possible sentence, a reprimand. The sentence was remitted shortly afterwards by General Sir Douglas Haig, as Commander-in-Chief of the British Expeditionary Force, in view of Colquhoun's former distinguished conduct in the field.

By 1918 he was Commanding Officer of 2/4th Battalion, Leicestershire Regiment in 59th (2nd North Midland) Division. When the German spring offensive opened on 21 March 1918, the division's forward defences were quickly overrun. 2/4th Leicesters had only just come out of the line after 24 hours of continuous trench duty, but were sent straight back up to assist in the defence. The battalion could get no further forward than the rear of the Battle Zone where the 'line' was no more than a yet-to-be-dug trench marked out with the turf removed and no barbed wire. The men extended along the line even though they were completely exposed in the open. Under the inspiring leadership of Lieutenant-Colonel Colquhoun and Regimental Sergeant-Major 'African Joe' Withers, the battalion held off the Germans for the rest of the day, with modest casualties.

Colquhoun was wounded during the war and awarded the Distinguished Service Order (1916) and Bar (1918) and a Mention in Dispatches. After the war he was Honorary Colonel of the 9th Battalion Argyll and Sutherland Highlanders and Glasgow University Officer Training Corps, and President of the Dunbartonshire Territorial Association.

== Post-war ==
He was Lord Lieutenant of Dunbartonshire from 1919 until his death, Lord High Commissioner to the General Assembly of the Church of Scotland in 1932, 1940 and 1941 and Lord Rector of Glasgow University from 1934 to 1937. He was created a Knight of the Thistle in 1937. He was elected a Fellow of the Royal Society of Edinburgh in 1938 and resigned in 1942.

== Family ==
Colquhoun was the son and heir of Sir Alan John Colquhuon, 6th baronet, and his first wife, Justine Henrietta Kennedy. He succeeded his father as the 7th baronet in 1910, as Sir Iain Colquhoun of Luss and Chief of the Clan Colquhoun. Sir Iain married Geraldine Bryde (Dinah) Tennant (a granddaughter of Sir Charles Tennant, 1st Baronet) on 10 February 1915, and they had two sons (the elder succeeded his father as 9th baronet) and three daughters. One of their daughters, Fiona, a Segrave Trophy winner, married the 8th Earl of Arran (1910–1983), an Irish peer; the present 9th Earl is their son.

== Notes ==
Honorary titles
Preceded by The Lord Inverclyde	Lord Lieutenant of Dunbartonshire; 1919–1948	Succeeded by Alexander Telfer-Smollett
Academic offices
Preceded by Compton Mackenzie	Rector of Glasgow University; 1934–1937	Succeeded by Dick Sheppard
Masonic offices
Preceded by The Lord Saltoun	Grand Master of the Grand Lodge of Scotland; 1935–1936	Succeeded by The Duke of York, later King George VI
Baronetage of Great Britain
Preceded by Alan John Colquhoun	Baronet (of Luss); 1910–1948	Succeeded by Ivar Iain Colquhoun
