= Granville Chetwynd-Stapylton =

British Army general (1823–1915)

Lieutenant-General Granville Chetwynd-Stapylton
- Born: 22 March 1823
- Died: 28 April 1915 (aged 92)
- Military career
- Allegiance: United Kingdom
- Branch: British Army
- Rank: Lieutenant-General
- Conflicts: First Anglo-Afghan War

Lieutenant-General Granville George Chetwynd-Stapylton (22 March 1823 – 28 April 1915) was a British Army officer who became colonel of the Queen's (Royal West Surrey) Regiment, then the Duke of Cornwall's Light Infantry.

== Military career ==
Educated at the Royal Military College, Sandhurst, Chetwynd-Stapylton was commissioned as an ensign in the 13th Light Infantry in June 1839. He fought in the First Anglo-Afghan War and was present at the siege of Jellalabad. He was promoted to lieutenant in 1842, to captain in 1848 and to major in 1857. After further promotions, he became a major general in 1870, serving as commander of Brigade Depot No. 69 at Clonmel in Ireland from 1873 to 1877. He retired from the Army in September 1881 and was granted the honorary rank of lieutenant-general. He served as colonel of the Queen's (Royal West Surrey) Regiment from 1896 to 1902, and then colonel of the Duke of Cornwall's Light Infantry until his death on 28 April 1915, aged 92.

Military offices
Preceded by Sir Edward Smyth	Colonel of the Queen's Royal Regiment (West Surrey); 1896–1902	Succeeded by Sir Thomas Kelly-Kenny
