= Earl of Arran (Ireland) =

Title in the peerage of Ireland

Earldom of Arran
- Gules, a fesse between three cross-crosslets fitchée or.
- Creation date: 1762
- Creation: Second
- Created by: George III
- Peerage: Peerage of Ireland
- First holder: Arthur Gore, 1st Earl of Arran
- Present holder: Arthur Gore, 9th Earl of Arran
- Heir presumptive: William Henry Gore
- Subsidiary titles: Viscount Sudley, of Castle Gore; Baron Saunders of Deeps; Baron Sudley of Castle Gore; Baronet of Newtown
- Seat: Castle Hill House
- Former seat: Castle Gore

Earl of Arran is a title in the Peerage of Ireland. It is not to be confused with the title Earl of Arran in the Peerage of Scotland. The two titles refer to different places: the Aran Islands in Ireland, and the Isle of Arran in Scotland. The Irish earldom is held by the Gore family. The Scottish earldom is a separate title, held as a subsidiary title of the Duke of Hamilton.

== Irish creations ==
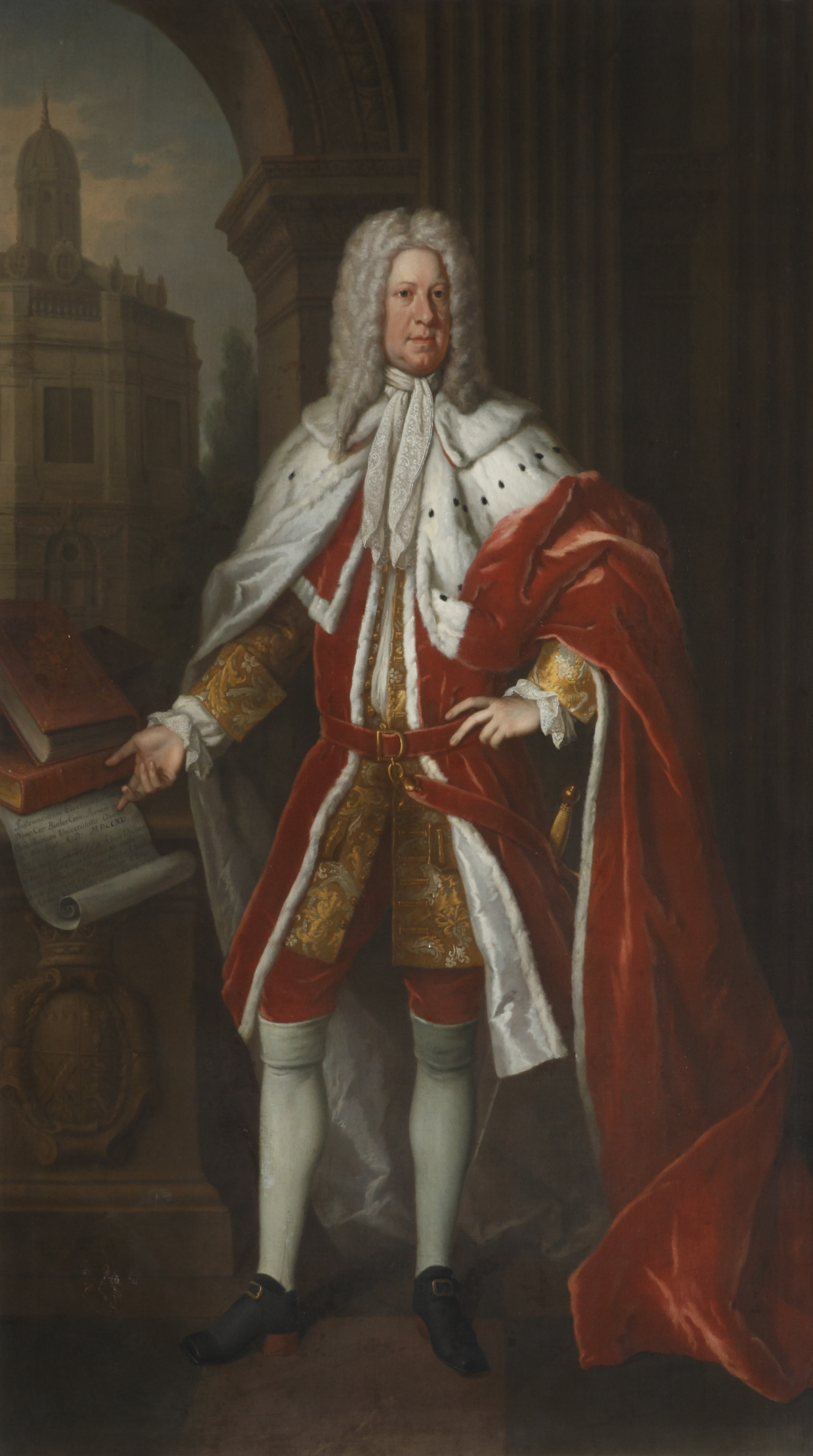
Charles Butler, 1st Earl of Arran.

The first Irish creation came in 1662 when Lord Richard Butler, younger son of the 1st Duke of Ormond, was created Baron Butler of Cloughgrenan, Viscount Tullough and Earl of Arran. However, the titles became extinct on his death in 1686 as he left no heirs. The next creation came in 1693 for his nephew Charles Butler (who was also created Baron Butler of Cloughgrenan and Viscount Tullough). These titles became extinct on his death in 1758.

The final creation in the Peerage of Ireland came in 1762, when Sir Arthur Gore, 3rd Baronet, was created Earl of Arran, of the Aran Islands in the County of Galway. He had previously represented Donegal Borough in the Irish House of Commons and had already been created Viscount Sudley, of Castle Gore in the County of Mayo, in 1758, and Baron Saunders, of Deeps in the County of Wexford, in 1758, in the Peerage of Ireland. He was succeeded by his son, the second Earl. He sat as a member of the Irish Parliament for Donegal Borough and was one of the original sixteen Knights of the Order of St Patrick. Lord Arran had sixteen children, and one of his daughters was Cecilia Underwood, Duchess of Inverness, second wife of the Duke of Sussex, son of King George III.

He was succeeded by his eldest son, the third Earl. He represented Baltimore and County Donegal in the British House of Commons. He was childless and was succeeded by his nephew, the fourth Earl. He was the son of Colonel the Hon. William John Gore. Lord Arran was a diplomat. His son, the fifth Earl, was also in the Diplomatic Service. In 1884 he was created Baron Sudley, of Castle Gore in the County of Mayo, in the Peerage of the United Kingdom. This peerage gave the earls an automatic seat in the House of Lords.

His son, the sixth Earl, was a soldier and also served as Lord Lieutenant of County Donegal. At his death in December 1958, he was succeeded by his elder son, the seventh earl, who died only nine days after his father and was succeeded by his younger brother, the eighth earl. In 1967, the eighth earl was a sponsor of the private member's bill which decriminalised homosexuality in England and Wales. As of 2016 the titles are held by his son, the ninth Earl, who succeeded his father in 1983. Lord Arran is a Conservative politician and one of the ninety elected hereditary peers that remain in the House of Lords after the passing of the House of Lords Act 1999. He is also in remainder to the Gore Baronetcy of Magherabegg (see below).

The baronetcy, of Newtown in the County of Mayo, was created in the Baronetage of Ireland in 1662 for Major Arthur Gore, who represented County Mayo in the Irish House of Commons. He was the second son of Sir Paul Gore, 1st Baronet, of Magherabegg. He was succeeded by his grandson, the second Baron. He sat as Member of the Irish Parliament for Donegal Borough and County Mayo. On his death the title passed to his son, the aforementioned third Baronet, who was later elevated to the peerage.

Several other members of the Gore family have also gained distinction. Hon. Charles Alexander Gore (1811–1897), the youngest brother of the fourth earl, was the father of barrister Sir Francis Charles Gore (1846–1940); Spencer William Gore (1850–1906), a noted cricketer and tennis player who won the first Wimbledon tournament in 1877; and the distinguished Anglican theologian the Rt. Rev. Charles Gore (1853–1932), Bishop of Oxford. Spencer William was also a founding partner of the surveying firm Smiths Gore. His younger son, the noted Post-Impressionist artist Spencer Frederick Gore (1878–1914), was the first president of the Camden Town Group and the father of painter Frederick Gore.

John Gore, 1st Baron Annaly, and Henry Gore, 1st Baron Annaly, were the sons of George Gore, second son of Sir Arthur Gore, 1st Baronet. The latter's third son William Gore was the ancestor of the Barons Harlech (the present holder of this title is also in remainder to the baronetcy of Newtown). Sir John Gore, brother of Sir Paul Gore, 1st Baronet, of Magherabegg, was Lord Mayor of London in 1624 and is the ancestor of the branch of the family which later inherited through marriage the earldom of Temple of Stowe. Also, Sir Booth Gore, 1st Baronet, of Artarman, was a descendant of Sir Francis Gore, fourth son of Sir Paul Gore, 1st Baronet, of Magherabegg.

The family seat is Castle Hill House, near Filleigh, North Devon.

== Earl of Arran, first creation (1662) ==
- Richard Butler, 1st Earl of Arran (1639–1686)

== Earl of Arran, second creation (1693) ==
- Charles Butler, 1st Earl of Arran (1671–1758)

== Earl of Arran, third creation ==
=== Gore baronets, of Newtown (1662) ===
- Sir Arthur Gore, 1st Baronet (died 1697)
- Sir Arthur Gore, 2nd Baronet (c. 1685–1741)
- Sir Arthur Gore, 3rd Baronet (1703–1773) (created Earl of Arran in 1762)

=== Earl of Arran (1762) ===
- Arthur Gore, 1st Earl of Arran (1703–1773)
- Arthur Saunders Gore, 2nd Earl of Arran (1734–1809)
- Arthur Saunders Gore, 3rd Earl of Arran (1761–1837)
- Philip Yorke Gore, 4th Earl of Arran (1801–1884)
- Arthur Saunders Gore, 5th Earl of Arran (1839–1901)
- Arthur Jocelyn Charles Gore, 6th Earl of Arran (1868–1958)
- Arthur Paul John James Charles Gore, 7th Earl of Arran (1903–1958)
- Arthur Strange Kattendyke David Archibald Gore, 8th Earl of Arran (1910–1983)
- Arthur Desmond Colquhoun Gore, 9th Earl of Arran (b. 1938)

The heir presumptive to the earldom is the present holder's third cousin once removed William Henry Gore (b. 1950)

The heir presumptive's heir apparent is his only son Charles David Gore (b. 1985)

There are no heirs to the barony of Sudley.

Line of succession
- Arthur Gore, 1st Earl of Arran (1703–1773)
  - Arthur Gore, 2nd Earl of Arran (1734–1809)
    - Arthur Gore, 3rd Earl of Arran (1761–1837)
    - Hon. William John Gore (1767–1836)
      - Philip Gore, 4th Earl of Arran (1801–1884)
        - Arthur Gore, 5th Earl of Arran (1839–1901)
          - Arthur Gore, 6th Earl of Arran (1868–1958)
            - Arthur Gore, 7th Earl of Arran (1903–1958)
            - Arthur Gore, 8th Earl of Arran (1910–1983)
              - Arthur Gore, 9th Earl of Arran (born 1938)
      - Hon. Charles Alexander Gore (1811–1897)
        - Sir Francis Charles Gore (1846–1940)
          - Charles Henry Gore (1881–1941)
            - Paul Annesley Gore (1921–2012)
              - (1). William Henry Gore (b. 1950)
                - (2). Charles David Gore (b. 1985)
              - (3). Nicholas David Gore (b. 1952)
                - (4). Alastair Mark Gore (b. 1984)
                  - (5). Sebastian Annesley Gore (b. 2019)
                  - (6). Raphael William Gore (b. 2021)
                - (7). Robert William Gore (b. 1986)
          - John Francis Gore (1885–1983)
            - Charles John Gore (1932–2021)
              - male issue and descendants in remainder
        - Spencer William Gore (1850–1906)
          - Spencer Frederick Gore (1878–1914)
            - Frederick John Pym Gore (1913–2009)
              - male issue and descendants in remainder
    - Very Rev. Hon. George Gore (1774–1844)
      - Ven. John Ribton Gore (1820–1894)
        - Arthur Saunders Gore (1848–1901)
          - Arthur Henry Baldwin Gore (1883–1953)
            - John Douglas Gore (1916–1976)
              - male issue and descendants in remainder
    - General Hon. Sir Charles Stephen Gore (1793–1869)
      - James Arthur Charles Gore (1826–1901)
        - Edward John Mounsey Gore (1863–1949)
          - Humphry Gerard Napier Gore (1916–2008)
            - male issue and descendants in remainder
        - William Stuart Gore (1868–1946)
          - Erroll Napier Gore (1897–1968)
            - male issue and descendants in remainder

== See also ==
- Baron Sudeley
- Duke of Ormonde
- Baron Harlech
- Gore Baronets, of Magherabegg, and of Artarman
- Earl Temple of Stowe
