= Edward Selby Smyth =

British Army general

General Sir Edward Selby Smyth KCMG
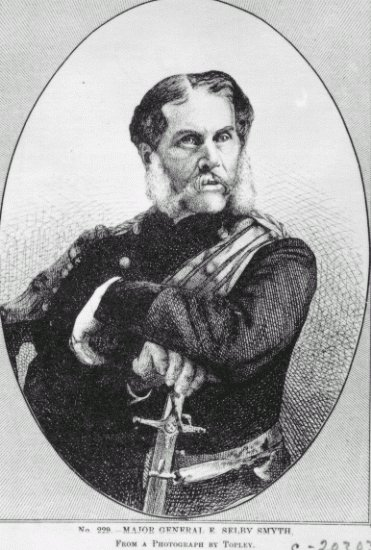
- Born: 31 March 1819; Belfast, Ireland
- Died: 22 September 1896 (aged 77); England
- Military career
- Allegiance: Canada
- Branch: Canadian Militia
- Rank: General
- Commands: General Officer Commanding the Militia of Canada
- Conflicts: Fenian Rising
- Awards: Knight Commander of the Order of St Michael and St George

General Sir Edward Selby Smyth, KCMG (31 March 1819 – 22 September 1896) was a British General. He served as the first General Officer Commanding the Militia of Canada from 1874 to 1880.

== Military career ==
Educated at Putney College in Surrey, Smyth was commissioned in to the 2nd Queen's Royal Regiment in 1841. He went straight to India only returning with his Regiment to England as Adjutant of his Battalion in 1846. He went to South Africa in 1851 to protect the administration of the Orange River Sovereignty from attack by the Basotho and Khoikhoi people.

In 1853 he was made Deputy Adjutant and Quartermaster-General of the 2nd Division in South Africa and then Adjutant and Quartermaster-General at British Army Headquarters in South Africa.

In 1861 he was appointed Inspector-General of the Militia in Ireland and was involved in suppressing the early stages of the Fenian Rising. He was appointed General Officer Commanding British Troops in Mauritius in 1870.

He was made General Officer Commanding the Militia of Canada in 1874: he carried out the role successfully and was thanked by the Governor-General of Canada for protecting Montreal from rioting.

== Family ==
In 1848 he married Lucy Sophia Julia Campbell, daughter of Major-General Sir Guy Campbell, 1st Baronet and Pamela FitzGerald.

Military offices
Preceded by Held by Commander-in-Chief, North America	General Officer Commanding the Militia of Canada; 1874–1880	Succeeded by Richard Luard
Preceded by Frederick Wilkinson	Colonel of The Queen's (Royal West Surrey Regiment); 1893–1896	Succeeded by Granville Chetwynd-Stapylton
Preceded by New Regiment	Colonel of the 1st Battalion, Seaforth Highlanders; 1881–1893	Succeeded by William Parke
Preceded by Charles Gascoyne	Colonel of the 72nd Regiment, Duke of Albany's Own Highlanders; 1881	Succeeded by Amalgamated into Seaforth Highlanders
