= Attorney General Wilkinson =

Attorney General Wilkinson may refer to:

- Andrew Wilkinson (born 1957/58), Attorney General of British Columbia
- David L. Wilkinson (fl. 1980s), Attorney General of Utah

== See also ==
- General Wilkinson (disambiguation)
