= Forest of Rambouillet =

Forest in Île-de-France, France

Coordinates: 48°39′N 1°50′E

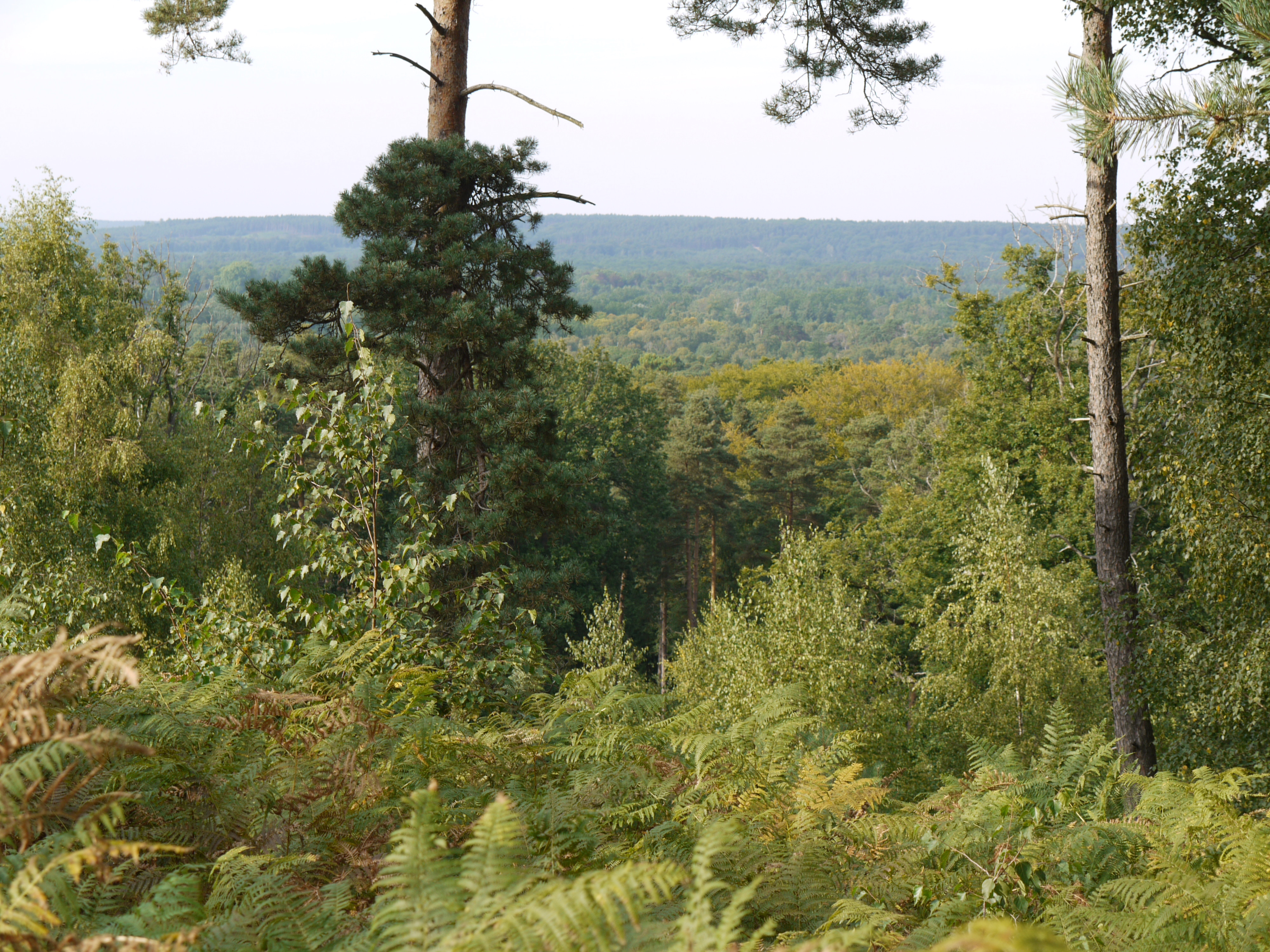
View of the forest

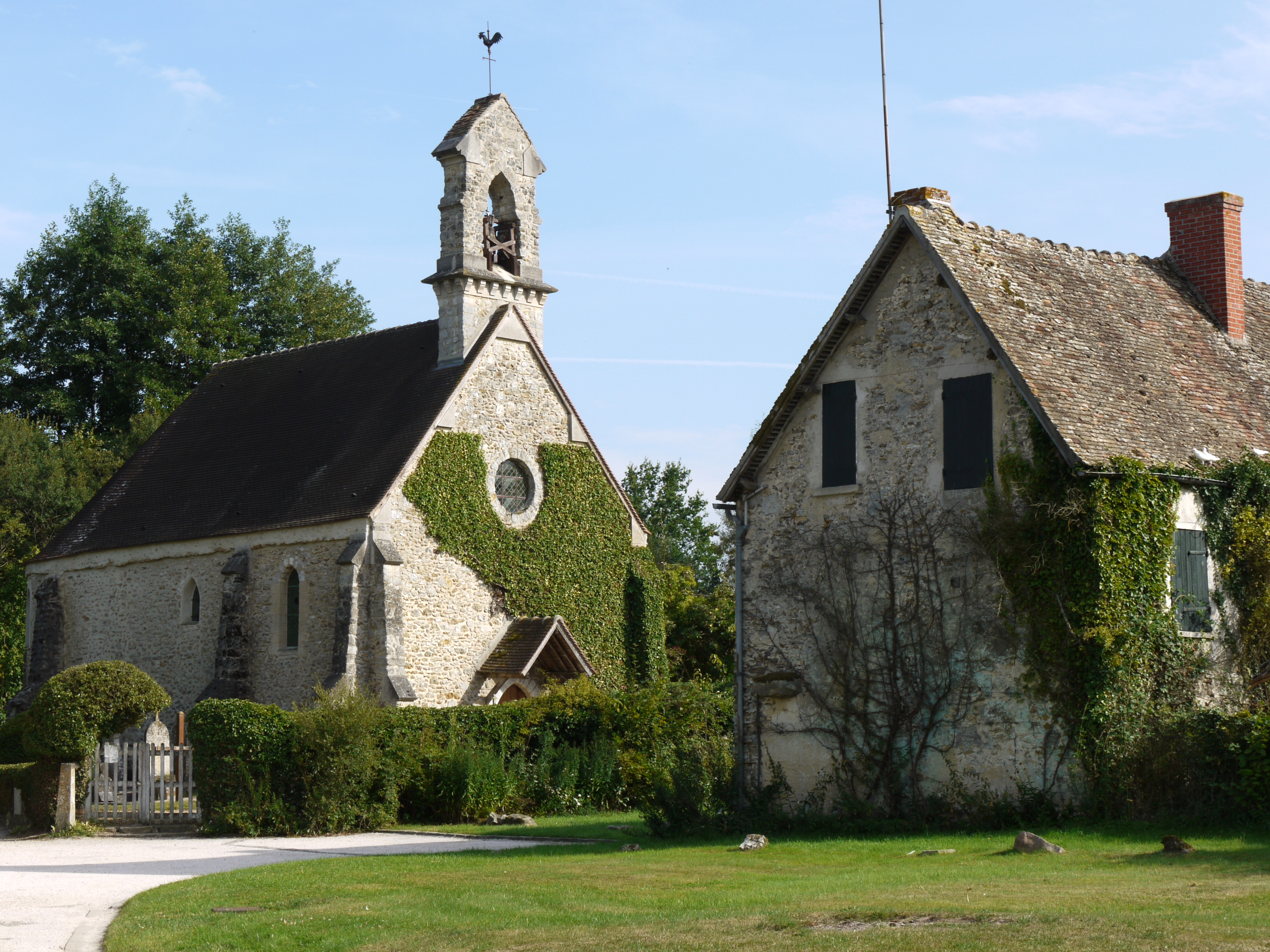
Église Sainte-Croix in Gambaiseuil

The forest of Rambouillet (French: Forêt de Rambouillet, pronounced [fɔʁɛ də ʁɑ̃bujɛ]), also known as the forest of Yveline (Forêt de l'Yveline [fɔʁɛ də livlin]) is a large forest covering some 200 km² (77 square miles), located to the west of Paris, in the Île-de-France region of France. The town of Rambouillet, after which it is named, lies on its southern edge.

== Geography ==
On 26 December 1999, cyclone Lothar hit the northern half of France, wreaking havoc to forests and parks. The forest of Rambouillet lost hundreds of thousands of trees.

In the southern part of the forest, there is a wild group of up to 150 Bennett's wallabies. This population has been present since the 1970s, when some individuals escaped from the zoological park of Émancé after a storm or due to vandalism in the park.

== See also ==
- List of forests in France
