= Robert Bruce (British Army officer, born 1821) =

General Robert Bruce of Glendouglie
- Born: 3 December 1821; Nord, Pas-de-Calais, France
- Died: 14 October 1891 (aged 69); Milnathort, Kinross-shire, Scotland
- Military career
- Allegiance: United Kingdom
- Branch: British Army
- Rank: General
- Commands: Commander of the Forces in Scotland
- Conflicts: 8th Xhosa War

General Robert Bruce of Glendouglie (3 December 1821 – 14 October 1891) was a British Army officer who became colonel of the Queen's Royal Regiment. He was Commander of the Forces in Scotland from 1878 to 1880.

== Early life and family ==
Robert Bruce was born in 1821 in Nord, France, the third son of John Bruce Bruce-Pryce (born John Bruce Knight, later Bruce-Pryce; 1784–1872), a Royal Navy agent and banker; and his first wife, Sarah Ann Austin (1788–1842), daughter of Rev. Hugh Williams Austin. Henry Bruce, 1st Baron Aberdare, was his elder brother. He was of Scottish, Welsh and English descent and grew up at the family's estate Dyffryn, Glamorganshire.

== Military career ==
Bruce was commissioned as an ensign in the 74th (Highland) Regiment of Foot on 9 June 1838. He saw action with his regiment in the 8th Xhosa War between 1851 and 1853. He became commanding officer of the 2nd battalion of his regiment in August 1857 in which capacity he was deployed to Gibraltar. He went on to become commander of the troops in the North British District in 1878. He became colonel of the East Yorkshire Regiment on 4 February 1890 and colonel of the Queen's Royal Regiment (West Surrey) on 6 June 1891.

== Marriage ==
In 1857, Bruce married 1857 Rachel Frances Corbet, daughter of Richard Corbet of Adderley, Shropshire. They had seven daughters.

- Constance Mary (23 January 1858 – ), married in 1879 Sir Francis Charles Gore
- Isabel (1860 – 27 February 1918), married in 1891 to Col. John Anstruther-Thomson of Charleton and Carntyne, 18th Lord St Clair (1818–1904), son of John Anstruther-Thomson
- Augusta Rachael (1861 – 15 February 1946), married in 1908 Lt-Col Sir Stewart Blakeley Agnew Patterson
- Amy Gertrude (1863 – 10 October 1939), married Thomas Edward Erskine
- Eleanor Blanche (20 November 1865 – 1947), married in 1896 John Hugh Armstrong Elliot
- Janet Sara (1866 – ), married in 1904 as his second wife Ludovick Duncombe-Jewell Cameron
- Margaret Lucy (7 March 1872 – 12 April 1951)

Military offices
| Preceded by Sir John Stuart | Commanding the troops in the North British District; 1878–1880 | Succeeded by Sir William Hope |
| Preceded by Henry Smyth | Colonel of the Queen's Royal Regiment (West Surrey); June 1891–October 1891 | Succeeded by Frederick Wilkinson |
