= Arthur Gore, 7th Earl of Arran =

Anglo-Irish peer, author and translator

The Right Honourable The Earl of Arran
- Born: Arthur Paul John James Charles Gore; 31 July 1903; St Pancras, London, England
- Died: 28 December 1958 (aged 55); Poltimore, Devon, England
- Education: New College, Oxford; Winchester College
- Occupations: Peer, author, translator
- Parent(s): Arthur Gore, 6th Earl of Arran; Maud van Kattendyke

Arthur Paul John James Charles Gore, 7th Earl of Arran (31 July 1903 – 28 December 1958), styled Viscount Sudley until shortly before his death, was an Anglo-Irish peer, author and translator.

== Biography ==
Gore was born in St Pancras, London, the first of two sons born to Lt-Col Arthur Gore, 6th Earl of Arran and Maud Jacqueline Marie Beauclerk, only daughter of 3rd Baron Huyssen van Kattendyke of Kattendijke, Zeeland, Holland.

He was educated at Winchester College and New College, Oxford. Commissioned as a lieutenant in the Essex Regiment, he served as aide-de-camp (1931–32) to George Villiers, 6th Earl of Clarendon, Governor-General of the Union of South Africa.

Gore was a homosexual bachelor. In a 1948 court case, two wrestlers whom he had invited home the previous day for wrestling and drinking, were prosecuted for theft.

=== Work as author and translator ===
Nicknamed "Pauly," he was the author of William, or More Loved than Loving, first published in 1933 by Collins, republished in 1956 by Chapman & Hall, in an edition with illustrations by Osbert Lancaster and an introduction by Evelyn Waugh. He was a translator of French and German texts. His translation of The Three Musketeers, under the name Lord Sudley, was published by Penguin in 1952.

He succeeded to the title Earl of Arran of the Arran Islands upon the death of his father on 19 December 1958, but never took his seat in the House of Lords. He died aged 55, on 28 December 1958 just nine days after the death of his father, at Poltimore, Devon. His curious death led to false accounts that it was a suicide; however, he died of a brain haemorrhage.

Following his death, a schoolmate eulogised him in The Times:

At Winchester "Pauly" was an intelligent, graceful, retiring boy with a delicious sense of humour. He was a sound bat in good company and already showed ability at lawn tennis, the game he grew to love. He blossomed at Oxford. His diffidence remained but became more subtle, and his charm, rooted in understatement, developed. At this time he taught himself to play the piano and he would sing for hours in his wistful Melville Gideon voice, to himself or to anyone who happened to be in the room. Pauly's great, and rare, gift was his originality: long after most men have become conditioned and conventionalised he continued to view the world with his own particular vision, which contained an extraordinary mixture of sophistication and innocence. He had a very affectionate nature, of which he was half ashamed, and could inspire lasting affection in others.

— The Times, 2 January 1959

His younger brother, who succeeded to the Earldom, sponsored in the House of Lords the private members bill which, as the Sexual Offences Act 1967, decriminalised homosexual acts between consenting adult men.

Peerage of Ireland
Preceded by Arthur Jocelyn Charles Gore	Earl of Arran; 1958	Succeeded by Arthur Strange Kattendyke David Archibald Gore
