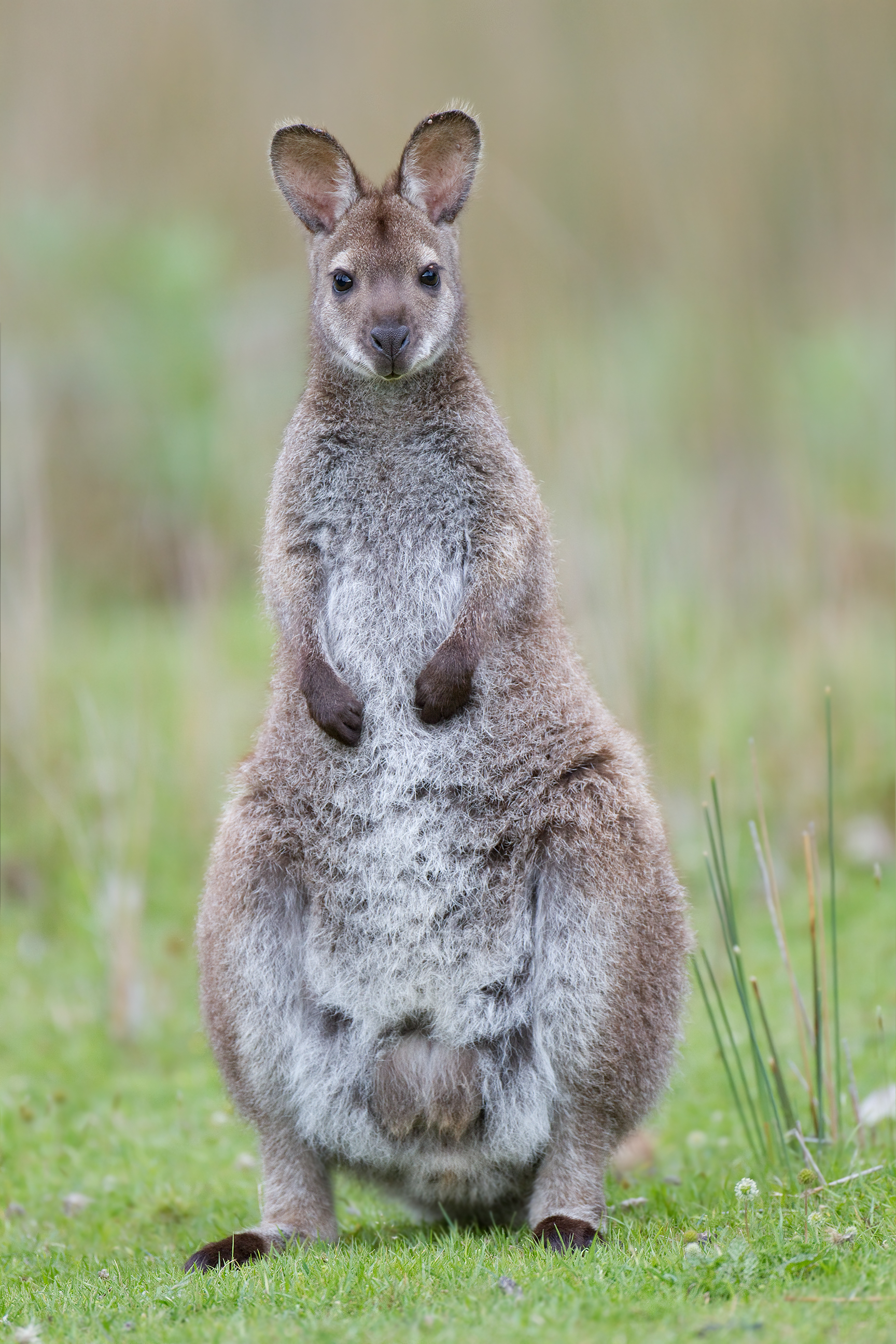
- Bennett's wallaby (N. r. rufogriseus), Bruny Island, Tasmania

Conservation status
- Least Concern (IUCN 3.1)

Scientific classification
- Kingdom: Animalia
- Phylum: Chordata
- Class: Mammalia
- Infraclass: Marsupialia
- Order: Diprotodontia
- Family: Macropodidae
- Genus: Notamacropus
- Species: N. rufogriseus

Binomial name
- Notamacropus rufogriseus (Desmarest, 1817)

Subspecies
- N. r. rufogriseus N. r. banksianus N. r. fruticus
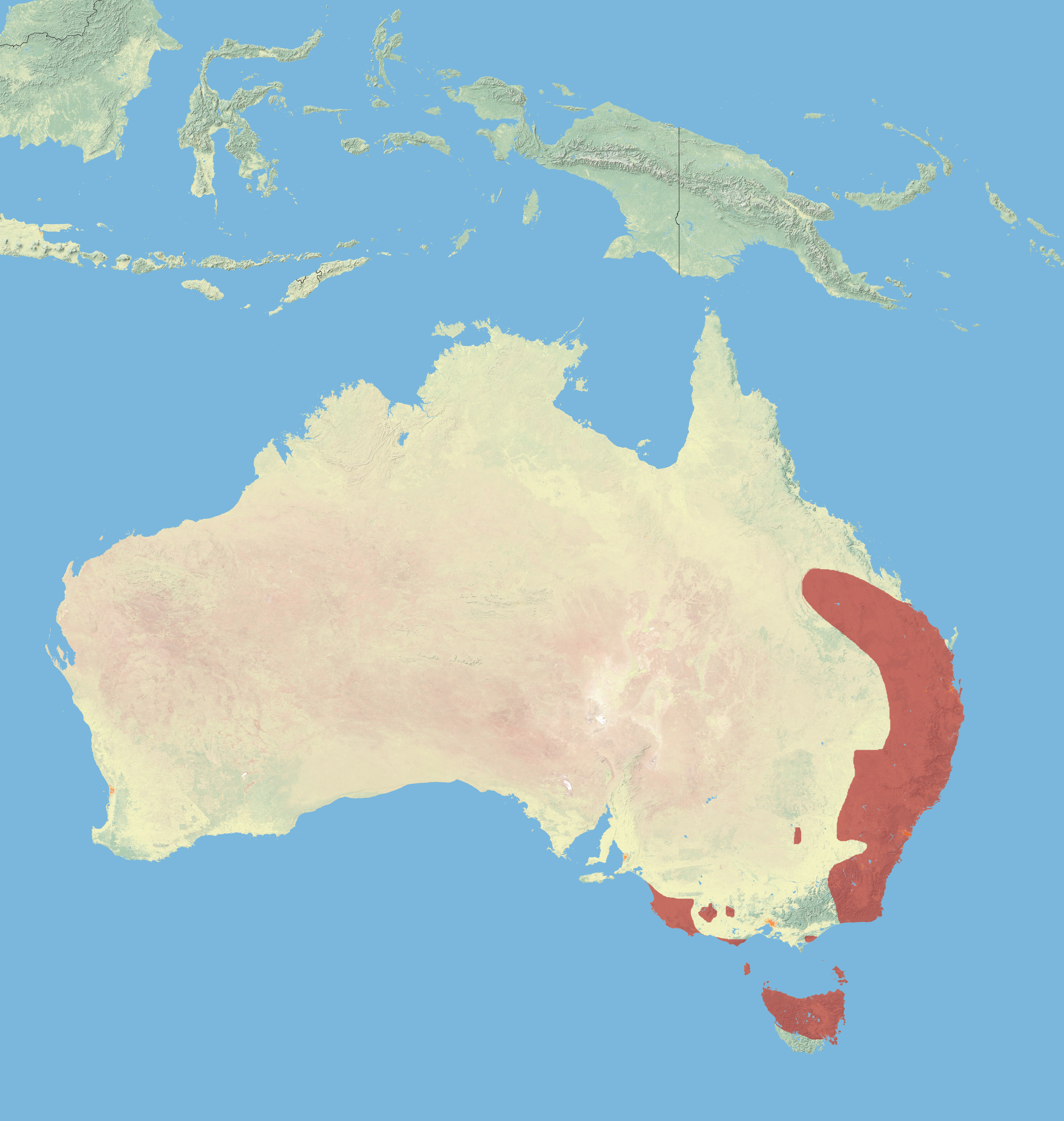
- Red-necked wallaby's native range

Synonyms
- Wallabia rufogriseus Desmarest, 1817; Macropus ruficollis (Desmarest, 1817); Macropus rufogriseus (Desmarest, 1817)

= Red-necked wallaby =

Species of marsupial

The red-necked wallaby or Bennett's wallaby (Notamacropus rufogriseus) is a medium-sized macropod marsupial (wallaby), common in the more temperate and fertile parts of eastern Australia, including Tasmania. Red-necked wallabies have been introduced to several other countries, including New Zealand, the United Kingdom (in England and Scotland), Ireland, the Isle of Man, France and Germany.

== Description ==
Red-necked wallabies are distinguished by their black nose and paws, white stripe on the upper lip, and grizzled medium grey coat with a reddish wash across the shoulders. They can weigh 13.8 to 18.6 kilograms (30 to 41 lb) and attain a head-body length of 90 centimetres (35 in), although males are generally bigger than females. Red-necked wallabies are very similar in appearance to the black-striped wallaby (Notamacropus dorsalis), the only difference being that red-necked wallabies are larger, lack a black stripe down the back, and have softer fur. Red-necked wallabies may live up to nine years.

== Distribution and habitat ==
Red-necked wallabies are found in coastal scrub and sclerophyll forest throughout coastal and highland eastern Australia, from Bundaberg, Queensland, to the South Australian border; in Tasmania and on many of the Bass Strait islands. It is unclear which of the Tasmanian islands have native populations as opposed to introduced ones.

In Tasmania and coastal Queensland, their numbers have expanded over the past 30 years because of a reduction in hunting pressure and the partial clearing of forest to result in a mosaic of pastures where wallabies can feed at night, alongside bushland where they can shelter by day. For not altogether clear reasons, they are less common in Victoria.

== Behaviour ==
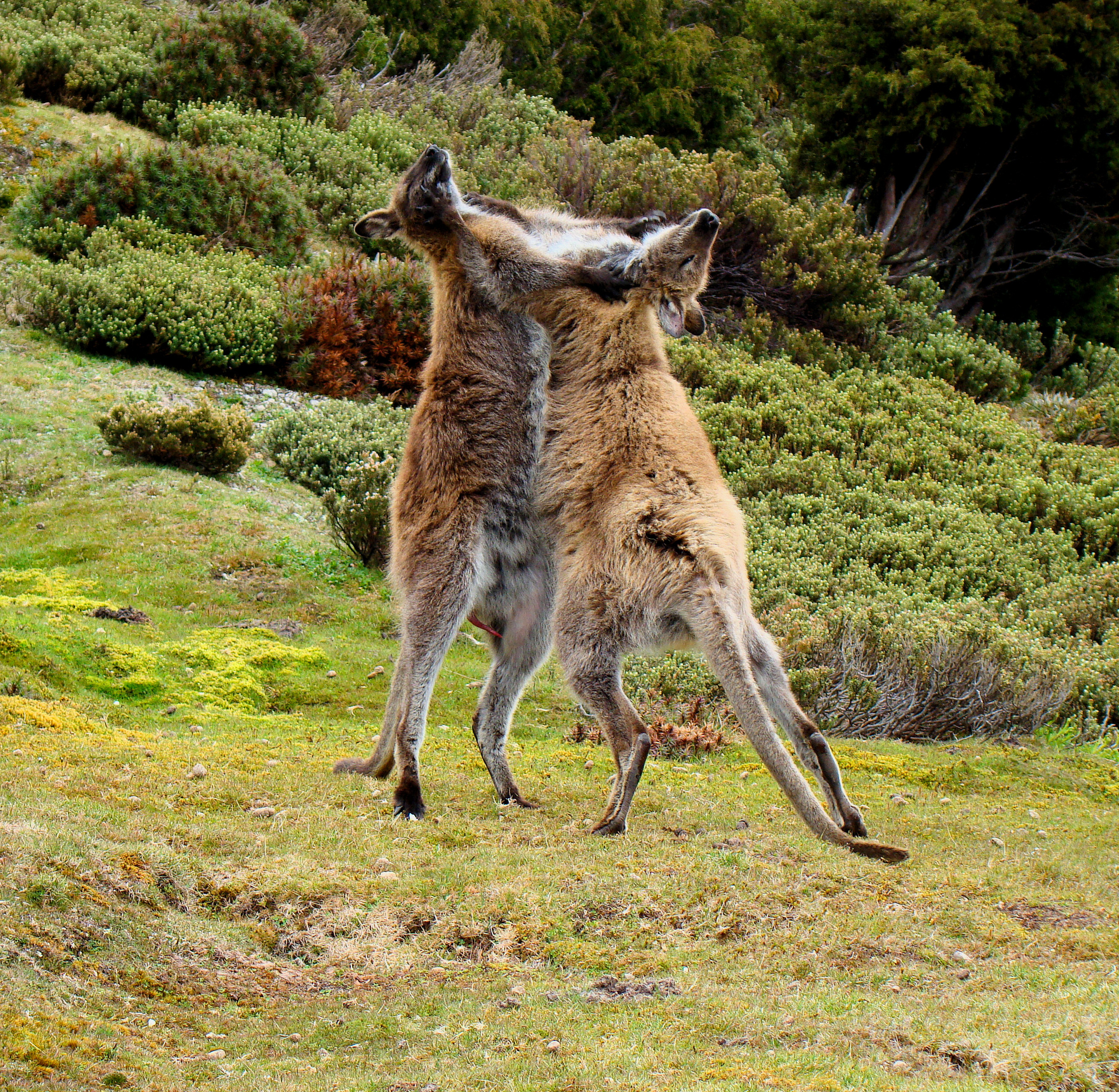
Two adult males fighting

Red-necked wallabies are mainly solitary but will gather together when there is an abundance of resources, such as food, water or shelter. When they do gather in groups, they have a social hierarchy similar to other wallaby species. A recent study has demonstrated that wallabies, as other social or gregarious mammals, are able to manage conflict via reconciliation, involving the post-conflict reunion, after a fight, of former opponents, which engage in affinitive contacts. Red-necked wallabies are mainly nocturnal. They spend most of the daytime resting.

A female's estrus lasts 33 days. During courting, the female first licks the male's neck. The male will then rub his cheek against the female's. Then the male and female will fight briefly, standing upright like two males. After that they finally mate. A couple will stay together for one day before separating. A female bears one offspring at a time; the young stay in the pouch for about 280 days, whereafter females and their offspring stay together for only a month. However, females may stay in the home range of their mothers for life, while males leave at the age of two. Also, red-necked wallabies engage in alloparental care, in which one individual may adopt the child of another. This is a common behavior seen in many other animal species like wolves, elephants, humans, and fathead minnows.

=== Diet ===
Red-necked wallabies’ diets consists of grasses, roots, tree leaves, and weeds.

== Subspecies ==
There are two or three subspecies:

- N. r. banksianus (Quoy & Gaimard, 1825) – red-necked wallaby [Australian mainland]
- N. r. rufogriseus (Desmarest, 1817) sensu lato – Bennett's wallaby, which is sometimes replaced by:
  - N. r. fruticus (Ogilby, 1838) [Tasmania]
  - N. r. rufogriseus (Desmarest, 1817) sensu stricto [Bass Strait, King Island]

The Tasmanian subspecies, Notamacropus rufogriseus rufogriseus, usually known as Bennett's wallaby, is smaller (as island species or subspecies often are), has longer, darker and shaggier fur, and breeds in the late summer, mostly between February and April. They have adapted to living in proximity to humans and can be found grazing on lawns in the fringes of Hobart and other urban areas.

The mainland Australian subspecies, Notamacropus rufogriseus banksianus, usually known as the red-necked wallaby, breeds all year round. Captive animals maintain their breeding schedules; Tasmanian females that become pregnant out of their normal season delay birth until summer, which can be anywhere up to 8 months later.

== Introductions to other countries ==
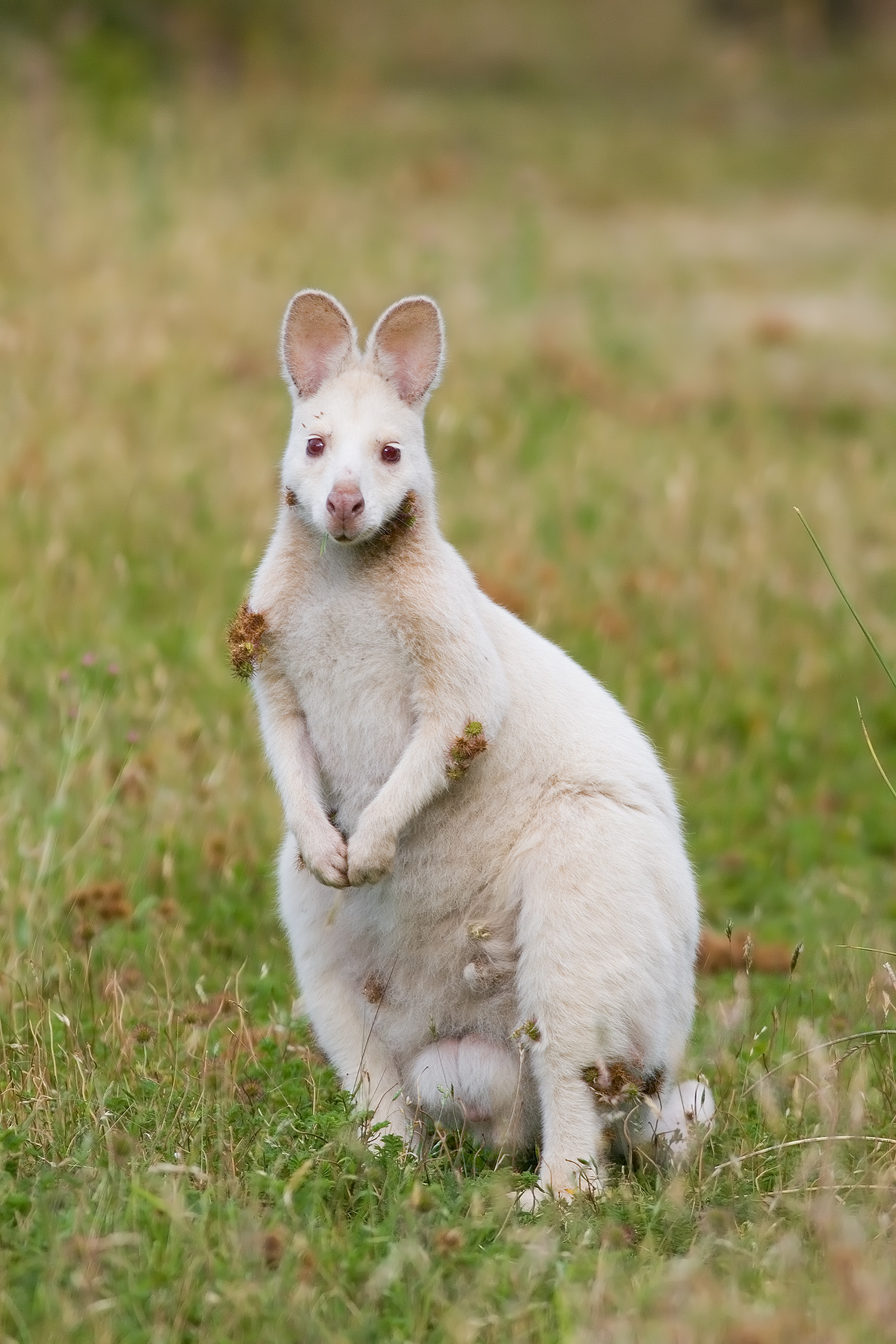
A population of albino Bennett's wallabies (N. r. rufogriseus) lives on Bruny Island.

There are significant introduced populations in the Canterbury Region of New Zealand's South Island. In 1870, several Bennett's wallabies were transported from Tasmania to Christchurch, New Zealand. Two females and one male from this stock were later released at Te Waimate, the property of Waimate's first European settler Michael Studholme. The year 1874 saw them freed in the Hunters Hills, where over the years their population has dramatically increased. Bennett's wallabies are now resident on approximately 350,000 ha of terrain in the Hunters Hills, including the Two Thumb Range, the Kirkliston Range and the Grampians. They have been declared an animal pest in the Canterbury Region and land occupiers must contain the wallabies within specified areas. Bennett's wallaby is now widely regarded as a symbol of Waimate.

There are also small colonies in England in the Peak District (extirpated), Derbyshire (extirpated), and the Ashdown Forest in East Sussex (population unknown). These were established ca. 1900. There are also frequent sightings in West Sussex and Hampshire, and in a video published January 2022 YouTuber 'Wildlife With Cookie' found a population in an unknown part of England not associated with the previous mentioned locations. One of this small population was a mother carrying a joey, confirming that breeding was still occurring in the UK. He also went on to locate wallabies with albinism in Kenilworth, Warwickshire.

There is a small colony of red-necked wallabies on the island of Inchconnachan, Loch Lomond in Argyll and Bute, Scotland. This was founded in 1975 with two pairs taken from the Whipsnade Zoo, and had risen to 26 individuals by 1993.

There is a significant group of escaped red-necked wallabies living wild across the Isle of Man, which are the descendants of numerous escapes from a wildlife park on the island in the 1960s and 1970s. A 2017 study by estimated their number in the vicinity of the wildlife park to be 83 individuals, including a very small number of Parma wallabies. A 2023 study by the Manx Wildlife Trust using drone and thermal technology resulted in the first accurate count of the red-necked wallabies in the Ballaugh Curragh Area of Special Scientific Interest and Ramsar site. Two nocturnal surveys, carried out across 400 hectares of the Ballaugh Curragh over two consecutive nights, gave an average number of 568 wallabies with a density of 140 per km². As the survey site included surrounding agricultural land, it is thought the density would be higher when the wallabies retreat into the wet woodland during the day. Wallabies are now widely reported across the northern half of the Isle of Man. Along with concerns about inbreeding leading to a high prevalence of blindness and neurological disorders, there is concern that they are having a detrimental impact on the native ecology of the island, therefore the Isle of Man Government has classed them as an invasive, non-native species via listing on Schedule 8 of the Wildlife Act 1990. Yet, Manx have tolerated them, and they have been a boon for nature tourism.

The Baring family, who owned Lambay Island off the eastern coast of Ireland, introduced red-necked wallabies to the island in the 1950s and 1960s. In the 1980s, the red-necked wallaby population at the Dublin Zoo was growing out of control. Unable to find another zoo to take them, and unwilling to euthanize them, zoo director Peter Wilson donated seven individuals to the Barings. The animals have thrived since then and the current population is estimated to be between 30 and 50.

In France, in the southern part of the Forest of Rambouillet, 50 km (31 mi) west from Paris, there is a wild group of around 50–100 Bennett's wallabies. This population has been present since the 1970s, when some individuals escaped from the zoological park of Émancé after a storm.

In Germany, a wild population originating from zoo escapees exists in the federated state of Mecklenburg-Vorpommern.

In October 2014, three captive Bennett's wallabies escaped into the wild in northern Austria and one of them roamed the area for three months before being recaptured, surprisingly surviving the harsh winter there. The case attracted media attention, as it humorously defeated the popular slogan "There are no kangaroos in Austria."

== Gallery ==
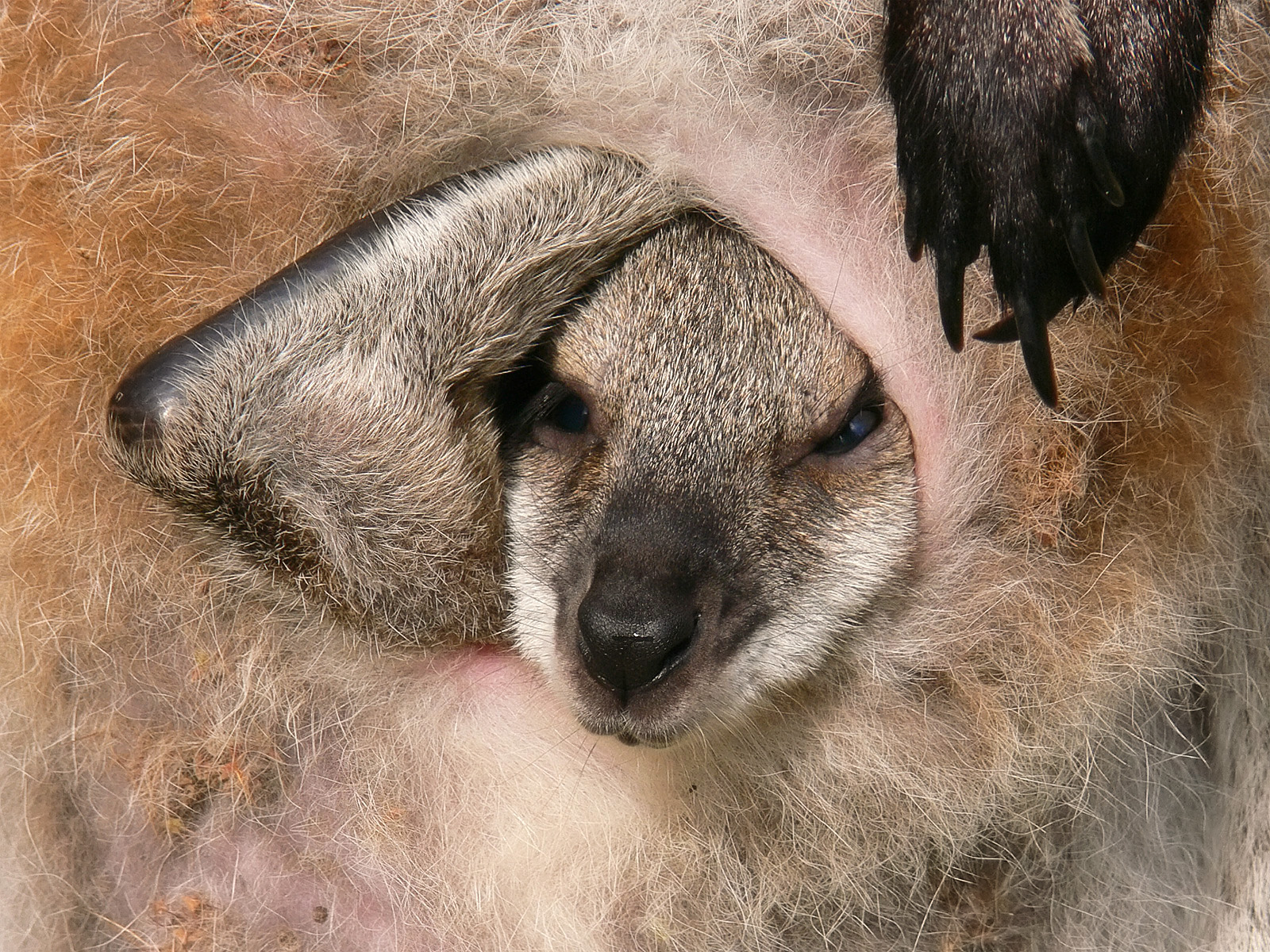
A joey in a pouch

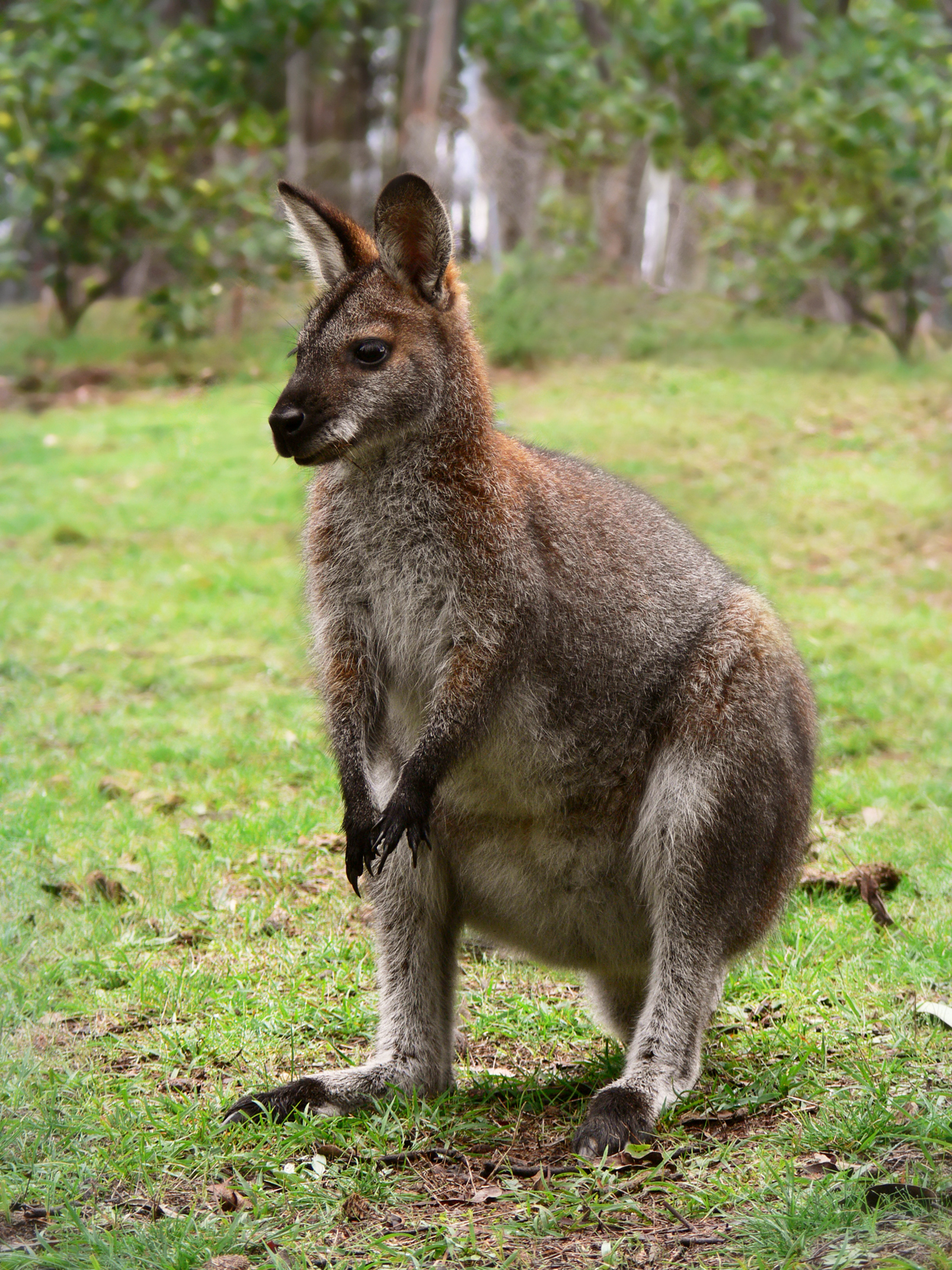
A red-necked wallaby (N. r. banksianus)

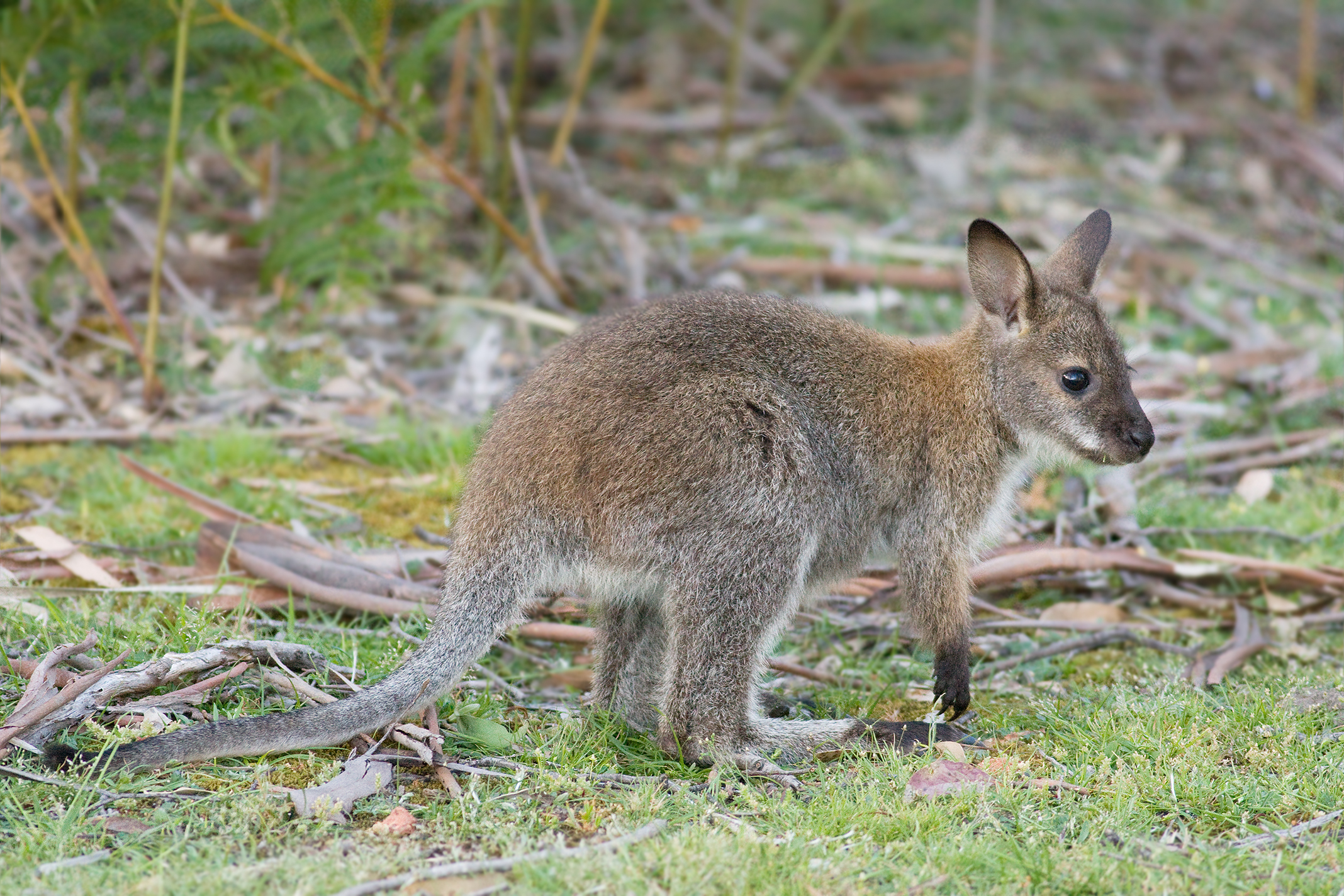
Juvenile
(N. r. rufogriseus)

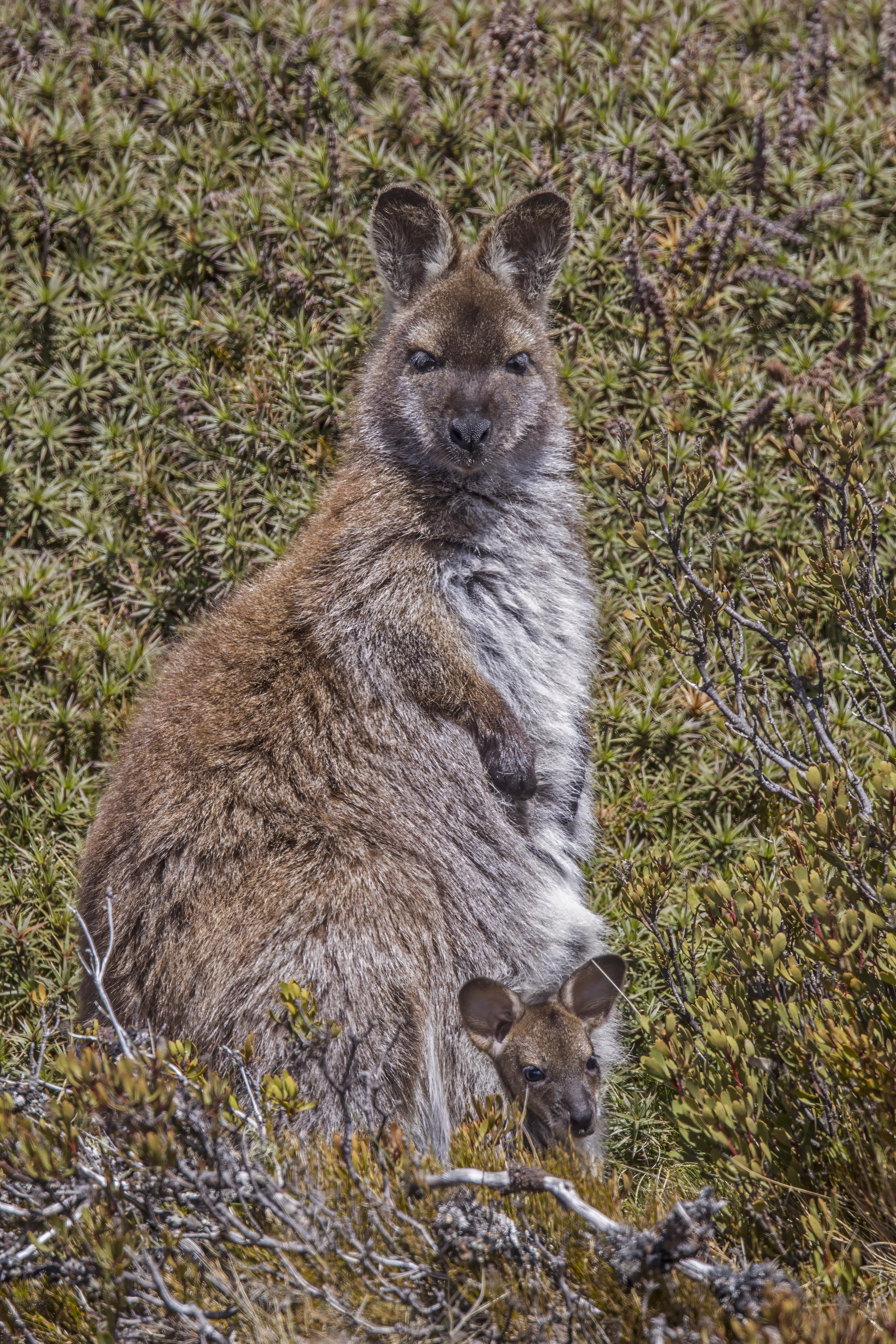
female and joey
(N. r. rufogriseus)

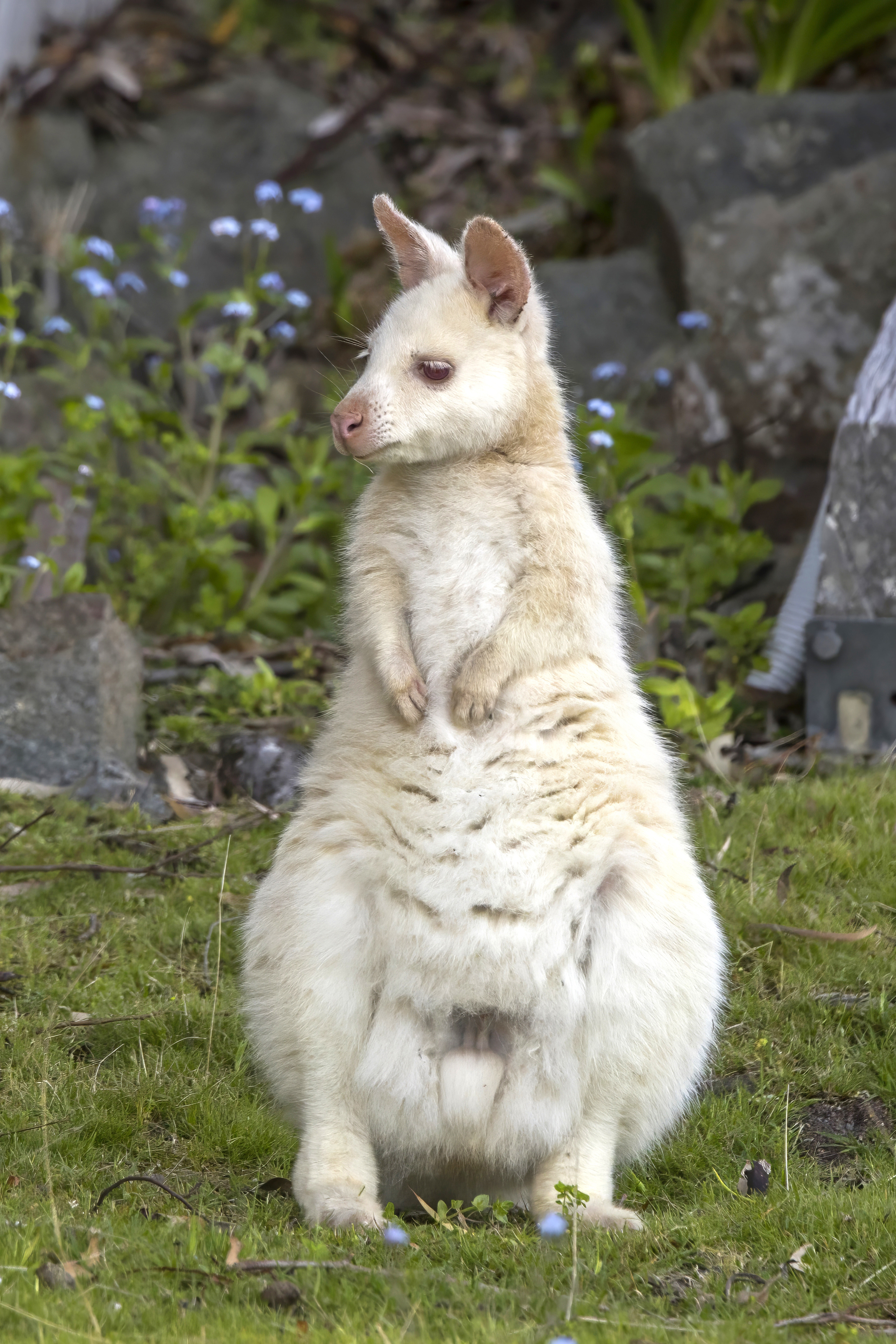
White wallaby female
(N. r. rufogriseus)

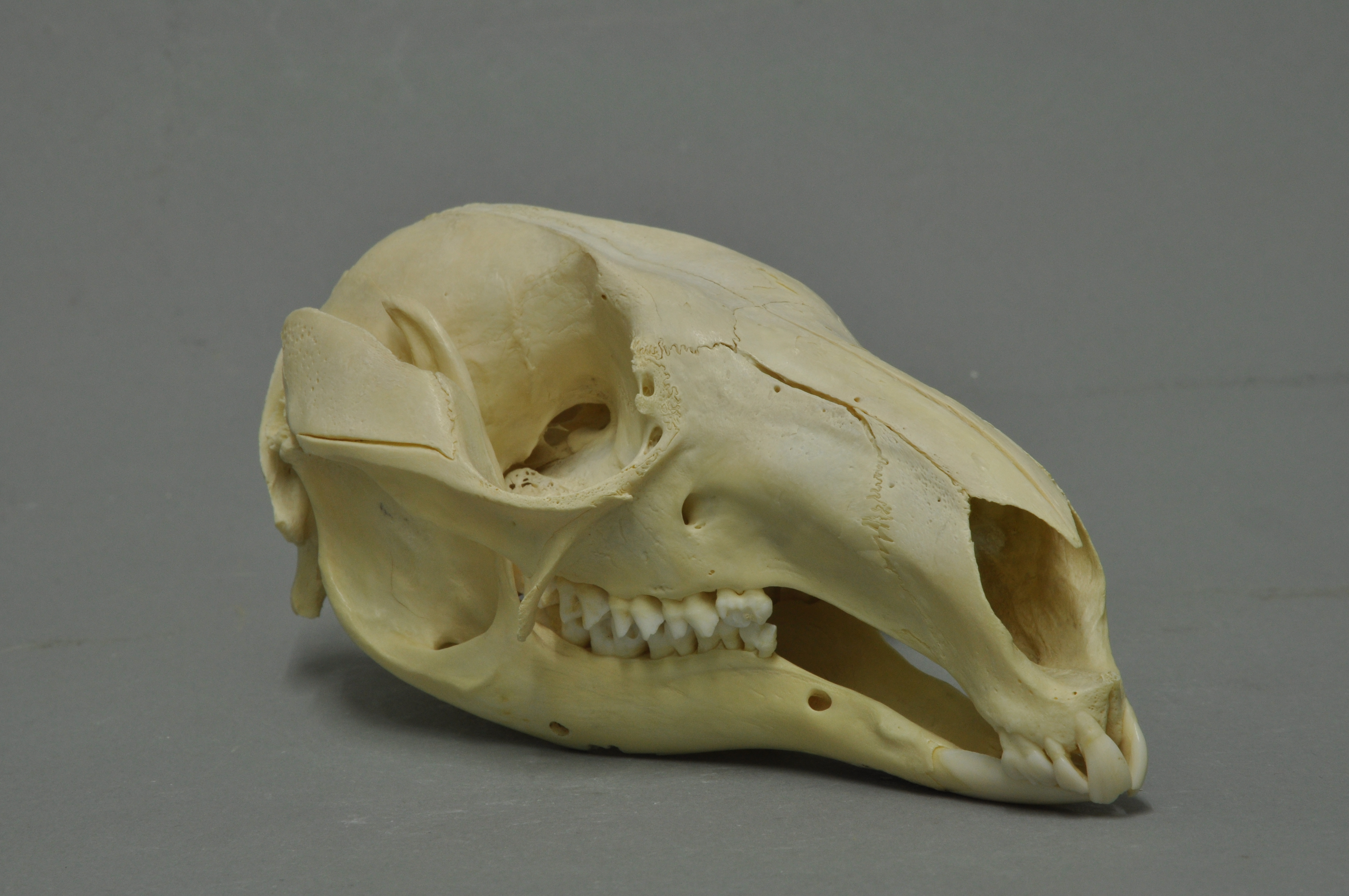
Skull
