= Inchconnachan =

Island in Scotland

Innis Chonachain (Gaelic)

Location
- Location within Argyll and Bute
- OS grid reference: NS375918
- Coordinates: 56.091°N 4.612°W

Name
- Name meaning: The Colquhoun's Island

Physical geography
- Island group: Loch Lomond
- Area: 35 ha
- Area rank: (Freshwater: 12)
- Highest elevation: 50 m (160 ft)

Administration
- Council area: Argyll and Bute
- Country: Scotland
- Sovereign state: United Kingdom

Demographics
- Population: ~7-10 Wallabies

Inchconnachan (Innis Chonachain in Gaelic, meaning 'The Colquhoun's Island') is an island in Loch Lomond in Scotland, in the Trossachs National Park. It is accessible by boat from the village of Luss on the south side of the Loch.

The island is uninhabited and is an Area of Special Scientific Interest and a Special Area of Conservation.

== Wallabies ==
Wallabies, of the species Macropus rufogriseus (Red-necked Wallaby), were introduced by Fiona, Countess of Arran, in the 1940s, and still roam wild. It is one of the few places outside Australia which has a viable population of wallabies.

== Sale ==
On 9 July 2020, Inchconnachan was put up for sale by the Colquhoun family, for over £500,000. It was sold to Soho House founder, Nick Jones and his wife, Kirsty Young.

The sale included a derelict colonial-style timber bungalow dating from the 1920s, built for the tea merchant Admiral Sullivan, which was later the holiday home of the family of Fiona Gore, Countess of Arran. Planning consent and detailed architectural drawings are in place to replace the bungalow with a new four-bedroom lodge and one-bedroom warden's house, along with a boat house and pier.

Objections have been received to the development including an online petition of over 100,000 signatures and an objection from the Woodland Trust Scotland, as the building work would involve cutting down trees including ancient oak woodland.

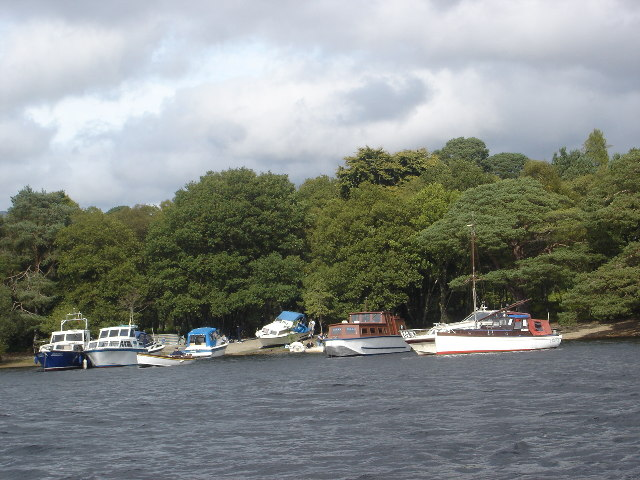
Boats moored at Inchconnachan

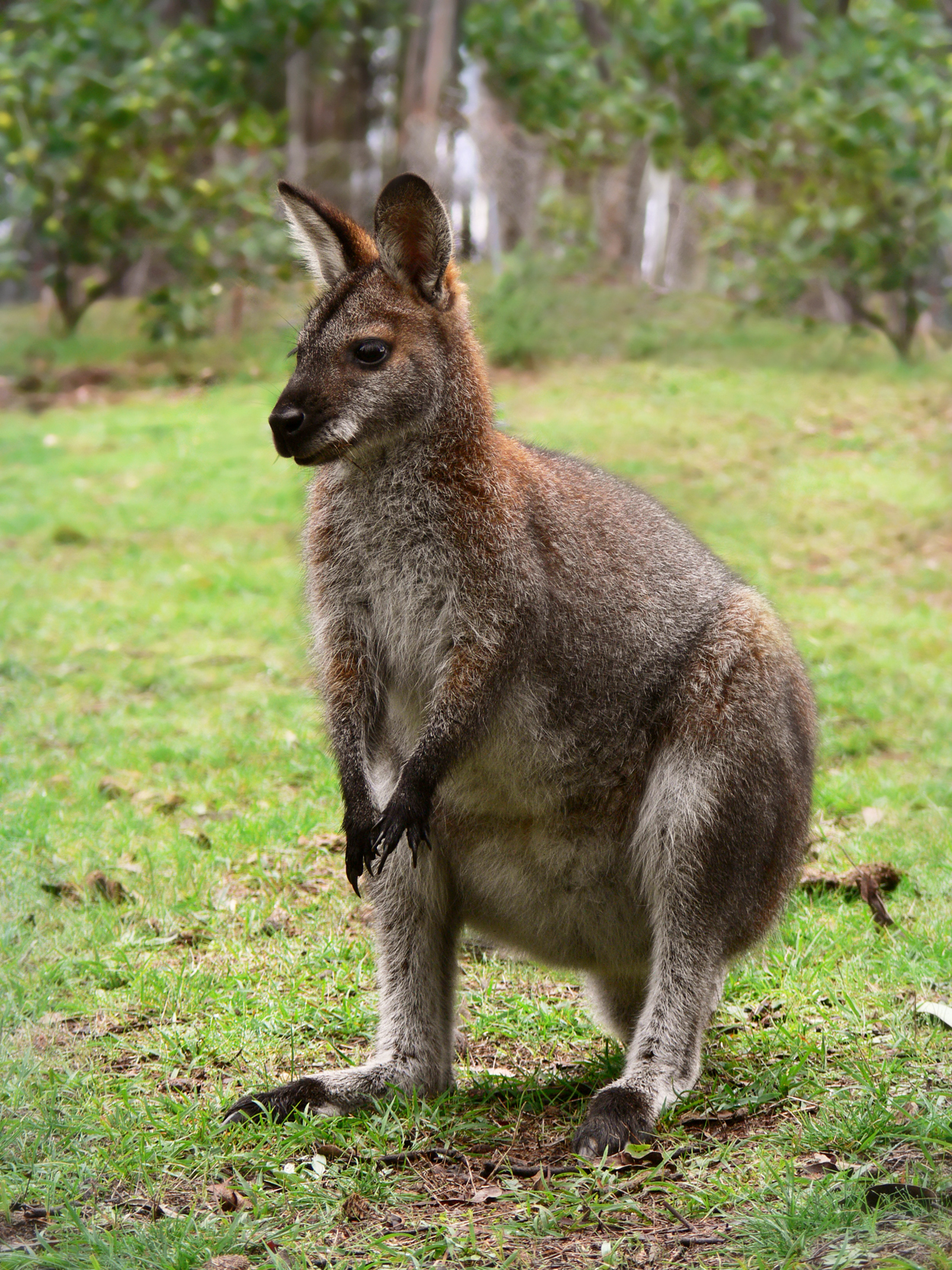
Red necked wallaby
