= Philip Gore, 4th Earl of Arran =

Anglo-Irish peer (1801–1884)

The Right Honourable The Earl of Arran KP
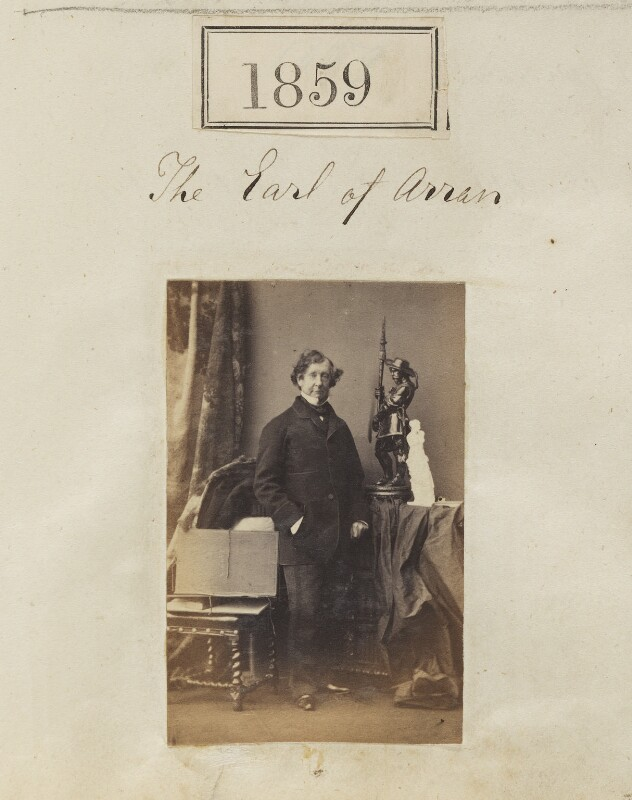
- Born: 23 November 1801; Dublin Castle, Dublin, Ireland
- Died: 25 June 1884 (aged 82); London, England
- Occupation: Peer
- Spouse: Elizabeth Napier (m. 1838; died 1884)
- Children: Arthur Gore, 5th Earl of Arran; Augustus Napier Gore; Lady Caroline Gore; Lady Elizabeth Gore; Lady Mary Napier Gore
- Parent(s): William John Gore; Caroline Hales

Philip Yorke Gore, 4th Earl of Arran KP (23 November 1801 – 25 June 1884), known as Philip Gore until 1837, was an Anglo-Irish peer and diplomat.

Born at Dublin Castle, Arran was the eldest son of Colonel the Hon. William John Gore, second son of Arthur Gore, 2nd Earl of Arran, and his wife Caroline, daughter of Sir Thomas Hales, 4th Baronet.

In 1820 Gore was sent as attaché to the British embassy in Stockholm, was transferred to Paris in 1825 and to Lisbon a year later. In 1828 he was promoted to secretary of legation in Buenos Aires where he was chargé d'affaires 1832–34. He succeeded his uncle Arthur as earl in 1837 and was made a Knight of the Order of St Patrick in 1841.

Lord Arran married Elizabeth Marianne Napier, second daughter of Sir William Francis Patrick Napier, in 1838. They had two sons and three daughters. He died in June 1884, aged 82, and was succeeded in his titles by his eldest son Arthur. Lady Arran died in 1899.

He owned 36,000 acres in Mayo and Donegal.

Peerage of Ireland
Preceded by Arthur Saunders Gore	Earl of Arran; 1837 – 1884	Succeeded by Arthur Saunders Gore
