= W. Wilkinson (British Army officer) =

British politician

W. Wilkinson was a British major-general known to have commanded forces at Bombay in 1813.
