= Jean Denton, Baroness Denton of Wakefield =

British businesswoman, racing driver and Conservative Party politician

The Right Honourable The Baroness Denton of Wakefield CBE
- Portrait by Nick Sinclair, 1992

Parliamentary Under-Secretary of State for Northern Ireland
- In office 20 July 1994 – 2 May 1997
- Monarch: Elizabeth II
- Prime Minister: John Major
- Preceded by: The Earl of Arran
- Succeeded by: The Lord Dubs

Parliamentary Under-Secretary of State for Environment
- In office 16 September 1993 – 11 January 1994
- Monarch: Elizabeth II
- Prime Minister: John Major
- Preceded by: The Lord Strathclyde
- Succeeded by: The Earl of Arran

Parliamentary Under-Secretary of State for Trade and Industry
- In office 14 April 1992 – 16 September 1993
- Monarch: Elizabeth II
- Prime Minister: John Major
- Preceded by: The Lord Reay
- Succeeded by: The Lord Strathclyde

Baroness-in-waiting Government Whip
- In office January 1992 – 15 April 1992
- Monarch: Elizabeth II
- Prime Minister: John Major
- Preceded by: new appointment
- Succeeded by: The Baroness Trumpington

Member of the House of Lords
- Lord Temporal
- Life peerage 11 June 1991 – 5 February 2001

Personal details
- Born: 29 December 1935 Wakefield, England
- Died: 5 February 2001 (aged 65) London, England
- Party: Conservative
- Spouse: Tony Denton (m. 1959; div. 1974)
- Education: London School of Economics

Jean Denton, Baroness Denton of Wakefield, CBE (29 December 1935 – 5 February 2001) was a British businesswoman, racing driver and Conservative Party politician.

== Background ==
Jean Moss was born in Wakefield on 1935, the daughter of Charles and Kathleen Moss (born Tuke). Her father worked at a hospital and her mother was a school cook. When she was 8 she represented Yorkshire in a child's version of the radio programme Round Britain Quiz. Moss attended Rothwell Grammar School near Leeds. When she was fourteen she had to take bed rest for a year to cure a kidney infection, despite this she became head girl and won a scholarship to attend the London School of Economics. She gained a BSc in Economics in 1958. Having earned her Economics degree she joined the marketing department of the consumer company Procter & Gamble.

== Career ==
From 1961 to 1964 she was in the marketing department of the Economist Intelligence Unit (EIU) which was part of The Economist group of companies. At about this time she became interested in motor-racing. She learnt to drive late at the age of 26. Until 1966 she worked for IPC Media and until 1969 she led the Hotel and Catering Department of the University of Surrey. In her spare time she won the 1967 and 1968 title of Britain's Woman Racing Champion.

In 1969 she gave up work in marketing and management and devoted her time to driving. She took part and was the only woman to complete in a sports car the London-Sydney Marathon. The following year she was sponsored by Woman magazine to drive an Austin Maxi in the World Cup rally through Europe and South America.

She combined her interests and skills and took work as a senior manager in the British automotive industry. She was Marketing Director for the Hampstead Huxford Garage Group from 1972 and in 1978 she moved to the Heron Motor Group at the invitation of Gerald Ronson. From 1980 she became the managing director of a car rental company until she became the most powerful female in the British car industry when she became the director of public relations for the Austin Rover group. In 1987, she was Director of the public relations company Burson-Marsteller.

In 1991 she was appointed a Commander of the Order of the British Empire. In 1992 she was created a life peeress, as Baroness Denton of Wakefield, of Wakefield in the County of West Yorkshire. She served as a Baroness-in-Waiting from 1991–2. She was Parliamentary Under-Secretary of State at the Department of Trade and Industry from 1992–3, at the Department of Energy from 1993–4, and at the Northern Ireland Office from 1994–7. After the 1997 general election, she served as the Conservative opposition spokesman on Trade and Industry in the House of Lords.

She was co-founder of Forum UK, the British section of the International Forum for Women and President (President) of the organization Women on the Move against Cancer.

== Personal life and death ==
In 1959, Jean Moss married Tony Denton, an engineer; they divorced in 1974.

Denton was diagnosed with breast cancer in 1989, which was treated at the time with a lumpectomy. In 1998, she was diagnosed with a brain tumour, and she died at a care home in London on 5 February 2001, at the age of 65.
