= George Gore (priest) =

The Hon.George Gore (25 February 1774 – 27 August 1844) was an Anglican priest in Ireland during the late 18th century.

Gore was the son of Arthur Gore, 2nd Earl of Arran and his second wife Anne Knight. He was educated at Trinity College, Dublin. He was Dean of Killala from 1817 until his death.
