= Émancé =

- Commune
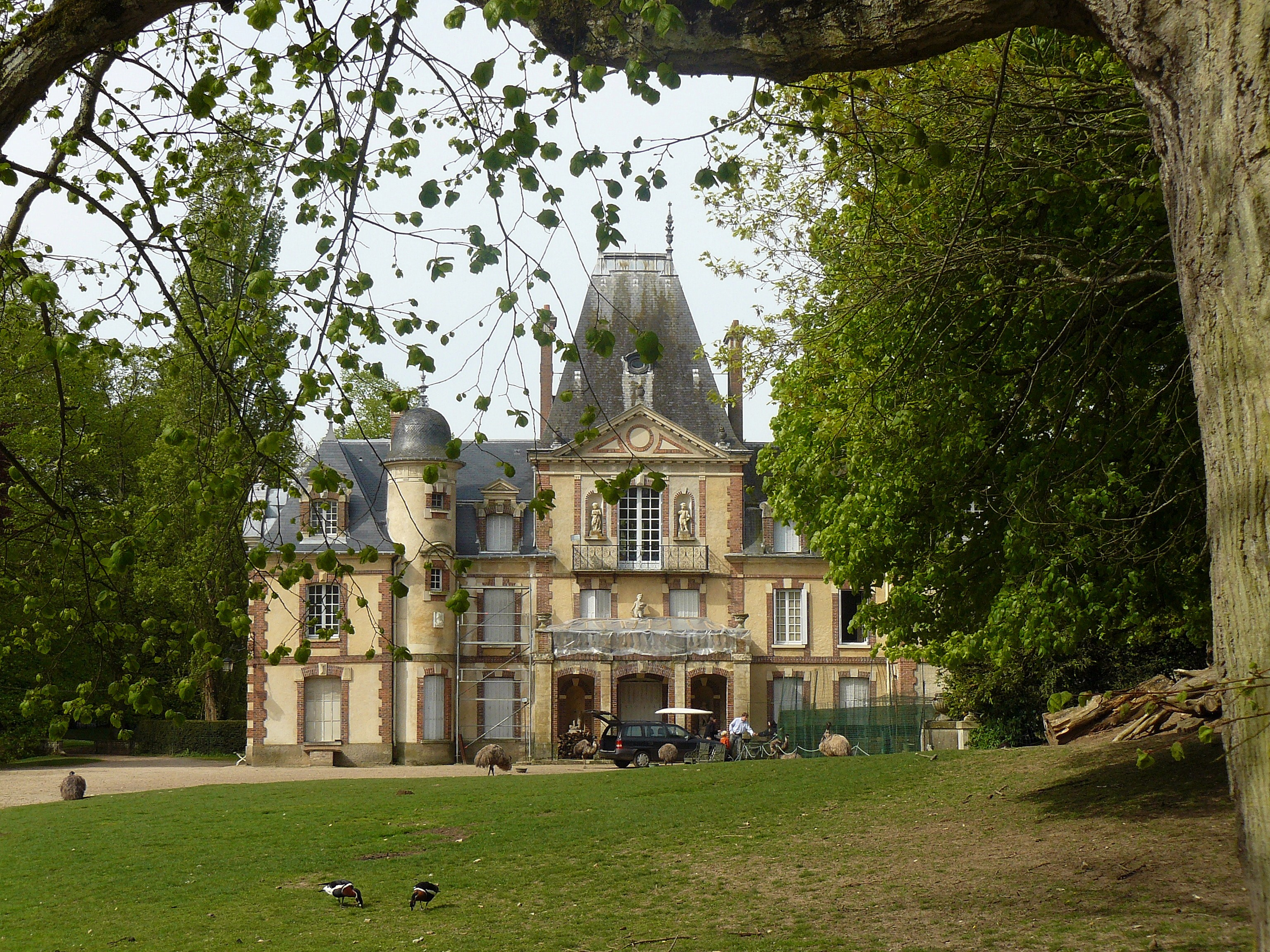
- Castle of Sauvage
- Location of Émancé
- Location within France Location within Île-de-France (region)
- Coordinates: 48°35′28″N 1°43′51″E
- Country: France
- Region: Île-de-France
- Department: Yvelines
- Arrondissement: Rambouillet
- Canton: Rambouillet
- Intercommunality: CA Rambouillet Territoires

Government
  - Mayor (2020–2026): Stéphanie Briolant
- Area^{1}: 11.99 km^{2} (4.63 sq mi)
- Elevation: 127 m (417 ft)
- Highest elevation: 167 m (548 ft)
- Lowest elevation: 119 m (390 ft)
- Population (2023): 872
  - Density: 72.7/km^{2} (188/sq mi)
- Time zone: UTC+01:00 (CET)
  - Summer (DST): UTC+02:00 (CEST)
- INSEE/Postal code: 78209 /78125
- ^{1} French Land Register data, which excludes lakes, ponds, glaciers > 1 km^{2} (0.386 sq mi or 247 acres) and river estuaries.

Émancé (French: [emɑ̃se]) is a commune in the Yvelines department in the Île-de-France in north-central France. It is around 50 km south west of Paris.

There is a population of feral wallabies nearby in the Forest of Rambouillet. This population has been present since the 1970s, when some individuals escaped from a zoological park in Émancé after a storm.

== See also ==
- Communes of the Yvelines department
