= Lord Lieutenants of Donegal =

Ceremonial officer in Donegal, Ireland

This is a list of people who served as Lord Lieutenant of County Donegal.

There were lieutenants of counties in Ireland until the reign of James II, when they were renamed governors. The office of Lord Lieutenant was recreated on 23 August 1831. The office is pronounced as 'Lord Lef-tenant'.

== Lieutenant ==
- Rory O'Donnell, 1st Earl of Tyrconnell: 28 March 1605–

== Governors ==
- Henry Conyngham, 1st Earl Conyngham: 1746–1781
- Ralph Gore, 1st Earl of Ross: 1781–
- William Conyngham: 1781–1796
- Robert Clements, 1st Earl of Leitrim: 1781–1804
- Sir Samuel Hayes, 1st Baronet: 1781–1807
- John Hamilton, 1st Marquess of Abercorn (died 1818)
- Nathaniel Clements, 2nd Earl of Leitrim: –1831
- Henry Conyngham, 1st Marquess Conyngham: 1803–1831
- Sir Samuel Hayes, 3rd Baronet: –1831

== Lord Lieutenants ==
- George Chichester, 2nd Marquess of Donegall: 17 October 1831 – 5 October 1844
- James Hamilton, 1st Duke of Abercorn: 13 November 1844 – 31 October 1885
- James Hamilton, 2nd Duke of Abercorn: 1885 – 3 January 1913
- Sir John Olphert: 9 August 1913 – 11 March 1917
- Arthur Gore, 6th Earl of Arran: 25 August 1917 – 1920
- Sir Emerson Herdman: 17 December 1920 – 1922
