= Frederick Green Wilkinson =

British army officer

Lieutenant-General Frederick Green Wilkinson CB
- Born: 15 November 1825
- Died: 1913 (aged 87–88)
- Military career
- Allegiance: United Kingdom
- Branch: British Army
- Rank: Lieutenant-General
- Conflicts: Crimean War

Lieutenant-General Frederick Green Wilkinson (15 November 1825 – 1913) was a British Army officer who became colonel of the Queen's Royal Regiment (West Surrey).

== Military career ==
Wilkinson was commissioned as an ensign in the 43rd (Monmouthshire) Regiment of Foot on 27 December 1842. Promoted to captain in the 42nd Regiment of Foot on 17 October 1851, he was present at the Battle of Alma in September 1854 and the Siege of Sevastopol in Winter 1854 during the Crimean War. He also served at the Siege of Lucknow in Summer 1857 during the Indian Rebellion.

He became colonel of the Queen's Royal Regiment (West Surrey) on 15 October 1891 and transferred in 1893 to be colonel of the Oxfordshire and Buckinghamshire Light Infantry until his death in 1913.

Green Wilkinson was chairman of the National Association for Employment of Reserve Officers.

== Family ==
His elder son was Brigadier-General Lewis Frederic Green-Wilkinson (1865-1950).

Military offices
Preceded by Robert Bruce	Colonel of the Queen's Royal Regiment (West Surrey); 1891–1893	Succeeded by Sir Edward Smyth
Preceded by John Leslie Dennis	Colonel of the Oxfordshire and Buckinghamshire Light Infantry; 1893–1913	Succeeded by Fiennes Middleton Colvile
