= Deel Castle =

Coordinates: 54.1082°N 9.254°W

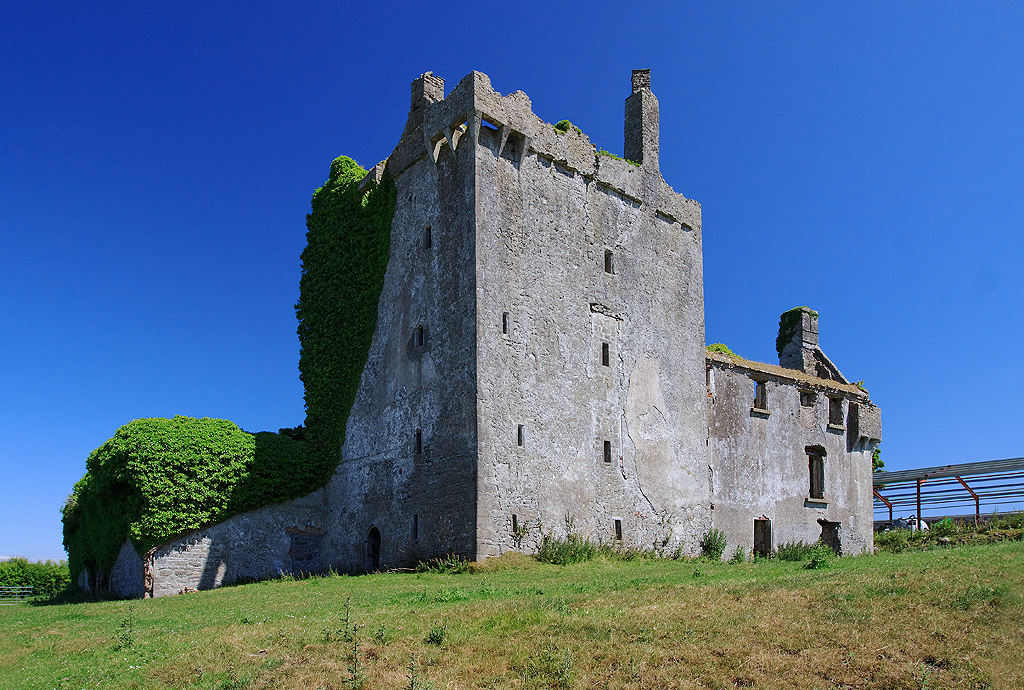
Deel Castle

Deel Castle (Irish: Caisleán na Daoile) was built in the 16th century by the Bourkes and later renamed Castle Gore. It is located near the town of Crossmolina, County Mayo, in Ireland

== History ==
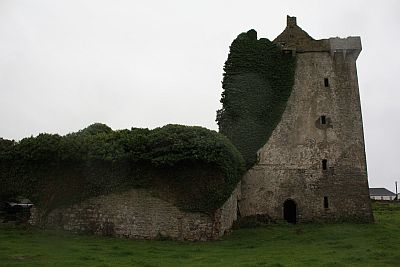
Tower house

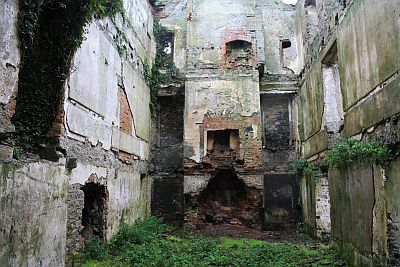
Inside the 18th-century wing

Deel Castle is a 16th-century tower house of the Bourkes which is close to the northern end of Lough Conn. The castle was built alongside the River Deel and its Irish name, Caisleán na Daoile means 'the Castle of the River Deel'.

After Colonel Thomas Bourke had fought on the side of King James II & VII in the Williamite Wars, the property was forfeited and given to the Gore family, afterwards Earls of Arran, who renamed it Castle Gore. The tower house had a large 18th-century wing with a rusticated doorway added to it; possibly incorporating a 17th-century range.

The castle, along with other lands, was leased to James Cuff, Lord Tyrawley, towards the end of the 18th century. It was occupied by the Cuff's steward for part of the 19th century. James Cuff, Lord Tyrawley, built a house beside the old Bourke castle in 1791. This country house was also called Castle Gore. This 18th century house was burnt by the IRA in 1922 and not rebuilt.

The old castle, which was still largely intact as of the early 20th century, has since fallen now a ruin.
