= Arthur Gore, 9th Earl of Arran =

British peer

The Right Honourable The Earl of Arran
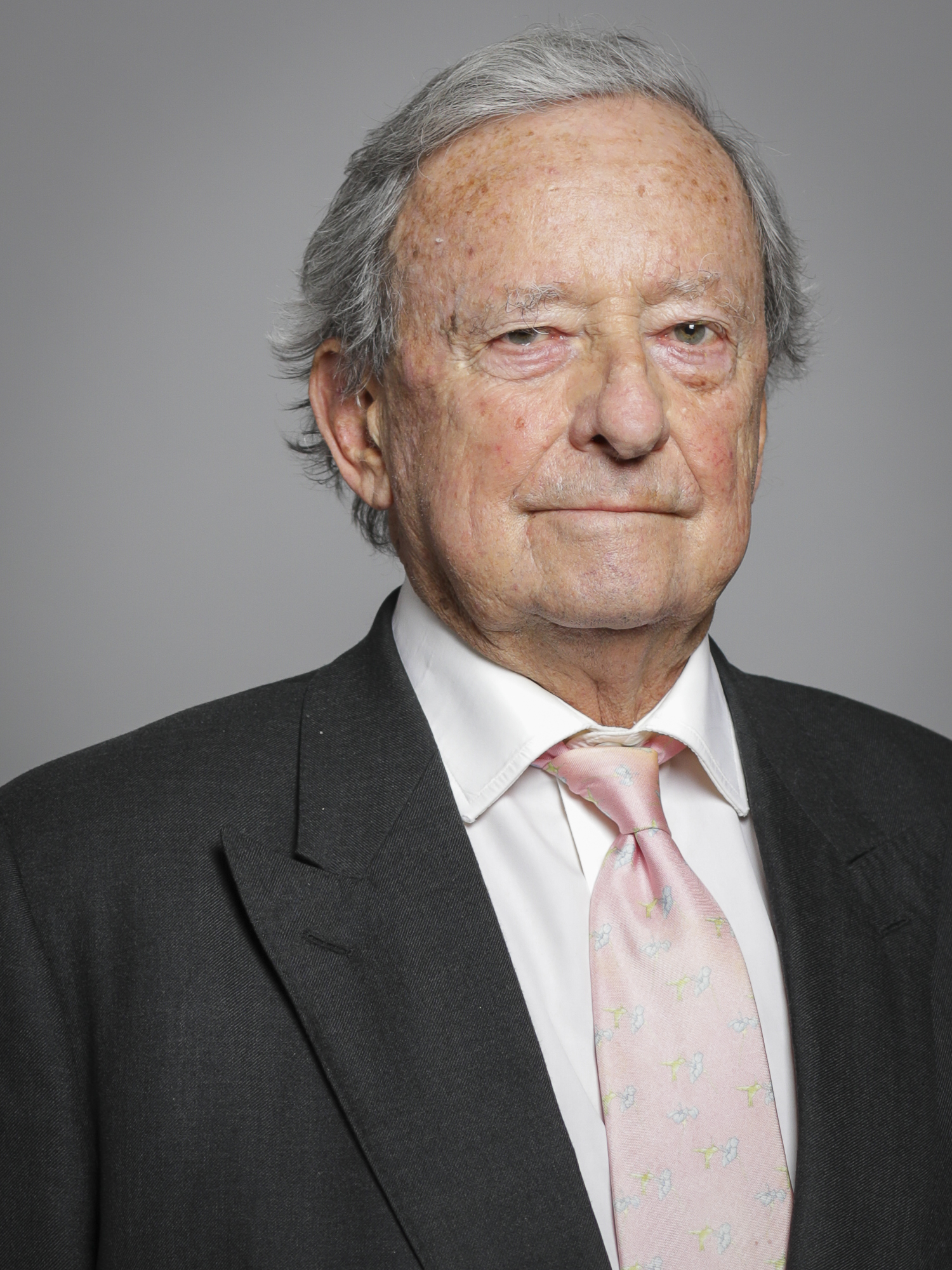
- Arran in 2019

Deputy Chief Whip of the House of Lords Captain of the Yeomen of the Guard
- In office 20 July 1994 – 12 January 1995
- Monarch: Elizabeth II
- Prime Minister: John Major
- Preceded by: The Earl of Strathmore and Kinghorne
- Succeeded by: The Lord Inglewood

Parliamentary Under-Secretary of State for Environment
- In office 11 January 1994 – 20 July 1994
- Monarch: Elizabeth II
- Prime Minister: John Major
- Preceded by: The Baroness Denton of Wakefield
- Succeeded by: Sir Paul Beresford

Parliamentary Under-Secretary of State for Northern Ireland
- In office 22 April 1992 – 11 January 1994
- Monarch: Elizabeth II
- Prime Minister: John Major
- Preceded by: Richard Needham
- Succeeded by: The Baroness Denton of Wakefield

Parliamentary Under-Secretary of State for Defence
- In office 28 November 1990 – 15 April 1992
- Monarch: Elizabeth II
- Prime Minister: John Major
- Preceded by: Kenneth Carlisle
- Succeeded by: The Viscount Cranborne
- In office 25 July 1989 – 26 July 1990
- Monarch: Elizabeth II
- Prime Minister: Margaret Thatcher
- Preceded by: Tim Sainsbury
- Succeeded by: Kenneth Carlisle

Lord-in-waiting Government Whip
- In office 18 June 1987 – 24 July 1989
- Monarch: Elizabeth II
- Prime Minister: Margaret Thatcher
- Preceded by: The Baroness Hooper
- Succeeded by: The Lord Reay

Member of the House of Lords
- Lord Temporal
- Hereditary peerage 25 April 1983 – 11 November 1999
- Preceded by: The 8th Earl of Arran
- Succeeded by: Seat abolished
- Elected Hereditary Peer; 11 November 1999 – 29 April 2026
- Election: 1999
- Preceded by: Seat established
- Succeeded by: Seat abolished

Personal details
- Born: 14 July 1938 (age 88)
- Party: Conservative
- Spouse: Eleanor van Cutsem (m. 1974)
- Children: 2
- Parent(s): The 8th Earl of Arran; Fiona Colquhoun
- Education: Eton College; Balliol College, Oxford

Arthur Desmond Colquhoun Gore, 9th Earl of Arran (born 14 July 1938), styled Viscount Sudley between 1958 and 1983, is a British peer and former member of the House of Lords, sitting with the Conservative Party.

== Early life ==
Lord Arran was born in Westminster, the eldest son of The 8th Earl of Arran and the former Fiona Colquhoun, first daughter of Sir Iain Colquhoun of Luss, 7th Baronet. He was educated at Eton College and Balliol College, Oxford.

== Career ==
He served in the Grenadier Guards, gaining the rank of second lieutenant. He was the assistant manager of the Daily Mail, then assistant general manager of the Daily Express and the Sunday Express in the 1970s. He was a director of Waterstone's (1984–87).

He succeeded as 9th Earl of Arran of the Aran Islands on 23 February 1983, upon the death of his father. In the Lord Arran has played an active role for the Conservative Party, serving in several junior ministerial roles.

== Marriage and children ==
On 28 September 1974, Arran married Eleanor van Cutsem, member of the Van Cutsem family, daughter of Bernard van Cutsem and Lady Margaret Fortescue, and granddaughter of Hugh Fortescue, 5th Earl Fortescue, and heiress of the Fortescue seat of Castle Hill, in Devon. She was appointed a Member of the Order of the British Empire (MBE) in the Queen's Birthday Honours 2008. Lord and Lady Arran run the Fortescue family's stately home, Castle Hill House and gardens in Devon, as a venue for weddings and corporate hospitality. He has no son, but has two daughters:

- Lady Laura Melissa Fortescue-Gore (born 14 June 1975), who married Major James Duckworth-Chad (maternal great-grandson of 7th Earl Spencer) on 16 October 2004. They have four children.
- Lady Lucy Katherine Fortescue-Gore (born 26 October 1976)

=== Heir presumptive ===
Since Lord Arran has no sons by his wife, and all other lines of descent from the 4th Earl of Arran have died out, his heir presumptive is currently his very distant cousin, William Henry Gore (born 1950), who lives in Australia, descended from the youngest brother of the 4th Earl.

== Arms ==
Coat of arms of Arthur Gore, 9th Earl of Arran
| Coronet A Coronet of an Earl Crest A Wolf rampant Argent collared Gules Escutcheon Gules a Fess between three Cross Crosslets fitchée Or Supporters On either side a Horse argent Motto In Hoc Signo Vinces (Under this sign thou shalt conquer) |

Political offices
| Preceded by The Baroness Hooper | Lord-in-waiting; 1987–1989 | Succeeded by The Lord Reay |
| Preceded by The Earl of Strathmore and Kinghorne | Captain of the Yeomen of the Guard; 1994–1995 | Succeeded by The Lord Inglewood |
Parliament of the United Kingdom
| New office created by the House of Lords Act 1999 | Elected hereditary peer to the House of Lords under the House of Lords Act 1999; Sat as Baron Sudley; 1999–2026 | Office abolished under the House of Lords (Hereditary Peers) Act 2026 |
Peerage of Ireland
| Preceded by Arthur Gore | Earl of Arran; 1983–present | Incumbent |
Peerage of the United Kingdom
| Preceded by Arthur Gore | Baron Sudley; 1983–present Member of the House of Lords (1983–1999) | Incumbent |
