= Connor O'Brien, 2nd Viscount Clare =

Irish viscount (1605–1670)

Connor O'Brien
- Viscount Clare
- Tenure: 1666–1670
- Successor: Daniel, 3rd Viscount Clare
- Born: c. 1605
- Died: 1670
- Spouse: Honora O'Brien
- Issue Detail: Daniel, & others
- Father: Daniel, 1st Viscount Clare
- Mother: Catherine FitzGerald

Connor O'Brien, 2nd Viscount Clare (c. 1605 – 1670) was the son of Daniel O'Brien, 1st Viscount Clare and Catherine FitzGerald, a daughter of Gerald, 14th Earl of Desmond.

== Birth and origins ==
Family tree

Connor O'Brien with wife, parents, and other selected relatives. (Note: This family tree is based on a pedigree of the viscounts of Clare, as well as genealogies of the viscounts of Clare and the Earls of Thomond. Also see the list of children in the text.)

Connor; 3rd Earl c. 1534 – 1581	Una; O'Brien d. 1589
Donogh; 4th Earl d. 1624	Elizabeth; FitzGerald d. 1617	Daniel; 1st Viscount; 1577–1666
Henry; 5th Earl c. 1588 – 1639	Barnabas; 6th Earl c. 1590 – 1657	Connor; 2nd Viscount; 1605–1670
Henry; 7th Earl; 1620–1691	Daniel; 3rd Viscount d. 1691
Daniel; 4th Viscount d. 1693

Gerald; 14th Earl of Desmond c. 1533 – 1583; Rebel Earl
Catherine; FitzGerald
Honora; O'Brien
Philadelphia; Lennart
Charles; 5th Viscount; 1673–1706

Legend

XXX	Subject of the article	XXX	Viscounts; Clare	XXX	Earls of Thomond	XXX	Earls of Desmond

Connor was born about 1605, the second son of Daniel O'Brien and his wife Catherine FitzGerald. His father was the 1st Viscount Clare. His father's family, the O'Briens, were a Gaelic Irish dynasty that descended from Brian Boru, medieval high king of Ireland.

Connor's mother was the widow of Maurice Roche, 6th Viscount Fermoy and the third daughter of Gerald FitzGerald, 14th Earl of Desmond, and his second wife, Eleanor Butler. Connor was one of 11 siblings, who are listed in his father's article.

== Marriage and children ==
O'Brien married Honora O'Brien, daughter of Daniel O'Brien of Duagh, County Kerry, and his wife Ellen FitzGerald, a daughter of the Knight of Glin.

Connor and Honora had a son:

- Daniel (died 1691), his successor

—and six daughters:

1. Margaret, married Hugh O'Reilly
2. Ellen, married Sir Roger Shagnessy
3. Honora, married John FitzGerald, 13th Knight of Kerry
4. Catherine, married 1st Garret FitzGerald of Castleishen and 2ndly John MacNamara
5. Sarah married Daniel Sullivan Bear
6. Mary married a Power of Doonil, whose first name in unknown

== Later life, death, and timeline ==
On 11 July 1662 when Charles II created his father Baron Moyarta and Viscount Clare, O'Brien gained the courtesy title of Baron Moyarta. On his father's death, which happened in 1663 or in 1666, Moyarta, as he was now, succeeded as the 2nd Viscount Clare.

Clare enjoyed his new title only a few years as he died about 1670. He was succeeded by his eldest son Daniel.

Timeline
Age	Date	Event
0	1605, about	Born
19–20	1625, 27 Mar	Accession of King Charles I, succeeding King James I
26–27	1632, 12 Jan	Thomas Wentworth, later Earl of Stafford, appointed Lord Deputy of Ireland
35–36	1641, 23 Oct	Outbreak of the Rebellion
37–38	1643, Nov	James Butler, 1st Marquess of Ormond appointed Lord Lieutenant of Ireland
43–44	1649, 30 Jan	King Charles I beheaded.
43–44	1649, 15 Aug	Oliver Cromwell landed in Dublin
46–47	1652, 12 May	Fall of Galway
46–47	1652, 27 Jun	Gave his son as hostage at the surrender of Ross Castle by Muskerry.
54–55	1660, 29 May	Restoration of King Charles II
60–61	1670	Died

== Notes and references ==
=== Sources ===
- Asch, Ronald G. (2004). "Wentworth, Thomas, first earl of Strafford (1593–1641)". In Matthew, Colin; Harrison, Brian (eds.). Oxford Dictionary of National Biography. Vol. 56. New York: Oxford University Press. pp. 142–157. ISBN 0-19-861408-X.
- Burke, Bernard (1883). A Genealogical History of the Dormant, Abeyant, Forfeited and Extinct Peerages of the British Empire (New ed.). London: Harrison. OCLC 499232768. – (for Thomond)
- Coffey, Diarmid (1914). O'Neill and Ormond – A Chapter of Irish History. Dublin: Maunsel & Company. OCLC 906164979.
- Cokayne, George Edward (1895). Complete Peerage of England, Scotland, Ireland, Great Britain and the United Kingdom, Extant, Extinct, or Dormant. Vol. VI (1st ed.). London: George Bell and Sons. OCLC 1180818801. – N to R (for Ormond)
- Cokayne, George Edward (1896). Complete Peerage of England, Scotland, Ireland, Great Britain and the United Kingdom, Extant, Extinct, or Dormant. Vol. VII (1st ed.). London: George Bell and Sons. OCLC 1180891114. – S to T (for Thomond)
- Cokayne, George Edward (1913). Gibbs, Vicary (ed.). The complete peerage of England, Scotland, Ireland, Great Britain and the United Kingdom, extant, extinct, or dormant. Vol. III (2nd ed.). London: St Catherine Press. OCLC 228661424. – Canonteign to Cutts (for Clare)
- Cusack, Mary Frances (1871). A Compendium of Irish History. Boston: Patrick Donahoe. OCLC 873009963.
- Firth, Charles Harding (1894) [1st pub. 1698]. The Memoirs of Edmund Ludlow Lieutenant-General of the Horse in the Army of the Commonwealth of England 1625–1672. Vol. I. Oxford: Clarendon Press. OCLC 1113948779. – 1625 to 1655
- Fryde, Edmund Boleslaw; Greenway, D. E.; Porter, S.; Roy, I., eds. (1986). Handbook of British Chronology. Royal Historical Society Guides and Handbooks, No. 2 (3rd ed.). London: Offices of the Royal Historical Society. ISBN 0-86193-106-8. – (for timeline)
- O'Brien, Donough (1949). History of the O'Briens from Boroimhe. Batsford: self-published. OCLC 1157152182.
- O'Donoghue, John (1860). Historical Memoir of the O'Briens. Dublin: Hodges Smith & Co. OCLC 316665132.
- Ohlmeyer, Jane (2004). "O'Brien, Daniel, first viscount Clare (1577?–1663)". In Matthew, Colin; Harrison, Brian (eds.). Oxford Dictionary of National Biography. Vol. 41. New York: Oxford University Press. pp. 358–359. ISBN 0-19-861391-1.
- Ó Siochrú, Micheál (October 2009). McGuire, James; Quinn, James (eds.). "O'Brien, Sir Daniel". Dictionary of Irish Biography.
- Warner, Ferdinand (1768). History of the Rebellion and Civil-War in Ireland. Vol. I. Dublin: James William. OCLC 82770539. – 1641 to 1643

Peerage of Ireland
Preceded by Daniel O'Brien	Viscount Clare; 1663–1670	Succeeded by Daniel O'Brien
