= Daniel O'Brien, 1st Viscount Clare =

Irish viscount (died 1666)

Daniel O'Brien
- Viscount Clare
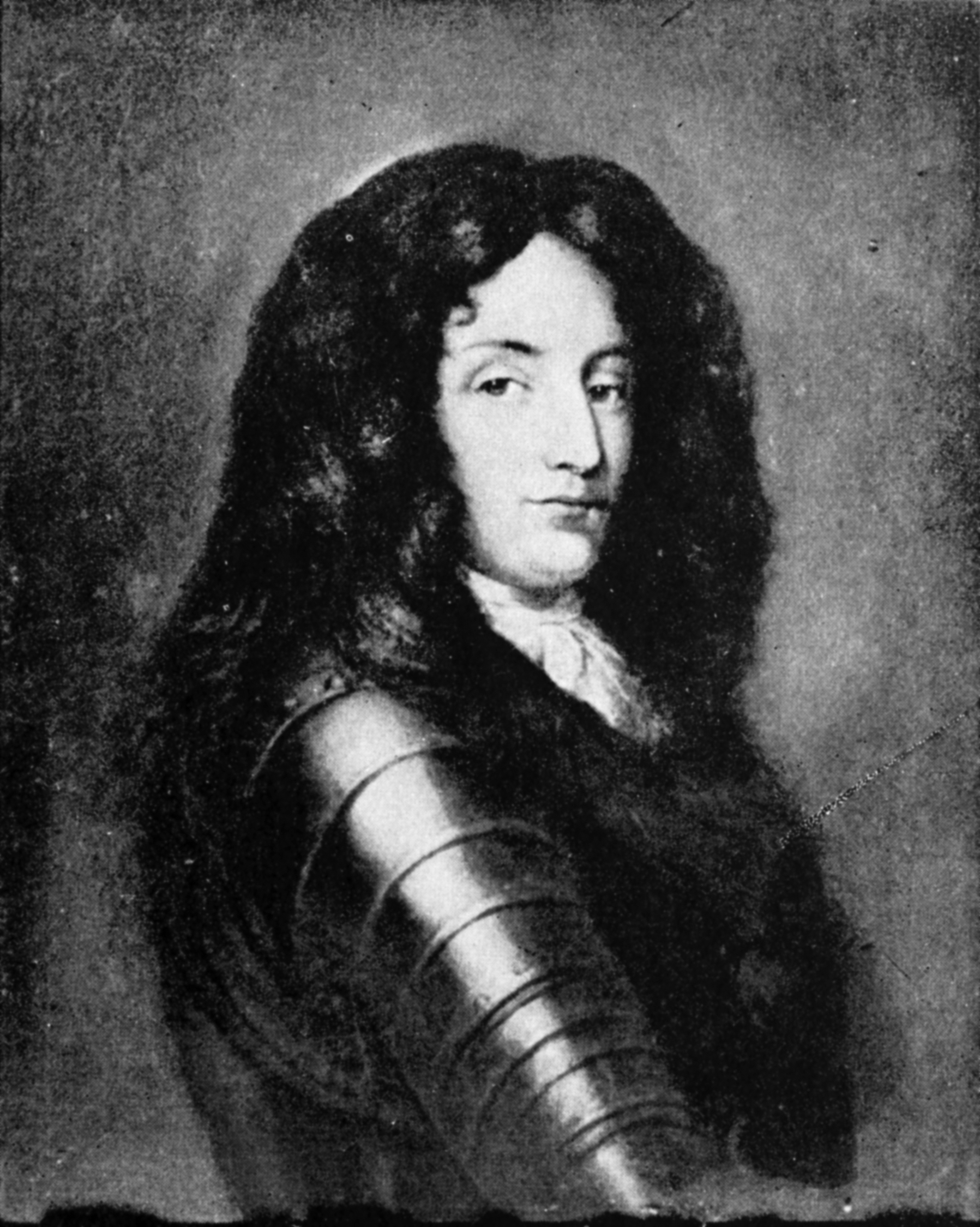
- Tenure: 1662–1666
- Successor: Connor, 2nd Viscount Clare
- Born: c. 1577
- Died: 1666
- Spouse: Catherine FitzGerald
- Issue Detail: Connor, & others
- Father: Connor, 3rd Earl of Thomond
- Mother: Una O'Brien-Ara

Sir Daniel O'Brien, 1st Viscount Clare also called Donal (c. 1577 – 1666) was an Irish politician and soldier. He was born a younger son of Connor O'Brien, 3rd Earl of Thomond. He fought against the insurgents at Tyrone's Rebellion, but for the insurgents in the Irish Rebellion of 1641 and the Irish Confederate Wars. He resisted the Cromwellian conquest of Ireland. He joined Charles II of England in exile and was in his eighties made a viscount at the Restoration.

== Birth and origins ==
Family tree

Daniel O'Brien with wife, parents, and other selected relatives. (Note: This family tree is based on a pedigree of the viscounts Clare, as well as genealogies of the viscounts of Clare and the Earls of Thomond. Also see the lists of siblings and children in the text.)

Donough; 2nd Earl d. 1553	Helen; Butler
Connor; 3rd Earl c. 1534 – 1581	Una; O'Brien d. 1589	Gerald; 14th Earl of Desmond c. 1533 – 1583; Rebel Earl
Donogh; 4th Earl d. 1624	Elizabeth; FitzGerald d. 1617	Daniel; 1st Viscount; 1577–1666	Catherine; FitzGerald
Henry; 5th Earl c. 1588 – 1639	Barnabas; 6th Earl c. 1590 – 1657	Connor; 2nd Viscount; 1605–1670	Honora; O'Brien
Henry; 7th Earl; 1620–1691	Daniel; 3rd Viscount d. 1691

Legend

XXX	Subject of the article	XXX	Viscounts; Clare	XXX	Earls of Thomond	XXX	Earls of Desmond

Daniel or Donal was born about 1577, the third and youngest son of Connor O'Brien and his second wife, Una O'Brien. or in 1666 and was succeeded by his eldest surviving son, Connor. His father was the 3rd Earl of Thomond.

His mother was a daughter of Turlough Mac-i-Brien-Ara. His parents were from different branches of the O'Briens, an important Gaelic Irish dynasty that descended from Brian Boru, medieval high king of Ireland. His father was from the branch of the Earls of Thomond. His mother was from the branch of the O'Briens of Ara in County Tipperary. She was a sister of Murtogh O'Brien-Arra, Anglican bishop of Killaloe.

Daniel was one of at least seven siblings, who are listed in his father's article. His eldest brother, Donogh, would become the 4th Earl of Thomond.

== Early life ==
Whereas Donough, the eldest brother and heir apparent to the earldom of Thomond, was educated as a Protestant in England, the younger brothers Teige and Daniel were educated as Catholics. The father died in 1581 and was succeeded by Daniel's eldest brother as the 4th Earl of Thomond. His mother died in 1589 at Clare Castle.

== Nine Years' War ==
In 1598 during the Nine Years' War, also known as Tyrone's Rebellion, the insurgents led by Hugh O'Neill, Earl of Tyrone and his ally Hugh Roe O'Donnell marched south to relieve the siege of Kinsale. O'Donnell invaded Clare, ravaging the country and capturing most of the castles. O'Brien had been left by his brother Donough O'Brien, 4th Earl of Thomond, absent in England, to defend his lands. In February 1599 O'Brien was attacked in his castle of Ibrickane, wounded, and taken prisoner by O'Donnell.

== Marriage and children ==
In 1600 O'Brien married Catherine FitzGerald, widow of Maurice Roche, 6th Viscount Fermoy, and the third daughter of Gerald FitzGerald, 14th Earl of Desmond, the rebel earl, and his second wife, Eleanor Butler.

Daniel and Catherine had four sons:

1. Donogh (died 1638), married Elizabeth Dowdall but died predeceasing his father.
2. Connor (1605–1670), succeeded as 2nd Viscount Clare
3. Morrough, died childless
4. Teige

—and seven daughters of which nothing seems to be known.

== Knight and Parliaments ==
On 1 July 1604 in Leixlip, County Kildare, O'Brien was knighted and became Sir Daniel O'Brien. He was elected as one of the two "knights of the shire", as county MPs were then called, for County Clare in the Irish House of Commons 1613 to 1614. At the election of the speaker O'Brien supported the Catholic candidate John Everard.

In the Irish Parliament of 1634–1635 he replaced his nephew Barnabas O'Brien, the future 6th Earl of Thomond, who had absented himself to England.

== Irish Rebellion and Confederate Wars ==
O'Brien was a member of the Supreme Council of the Catholic Confederates. In 1649 he fought the Cromwellians in Clare. He surrendered Clare Castle on 5 November and Carrigaholt Castle on 9 November.

In June 1652, at Ross Castle near Killarney, O'Brien together with Lord Muskerry surrendered to Ludlow. O'Brien served as a hostage to guarantee Muskerry's compliance with the terms.

== Restoration, Viscount Clare, and death ==
At the Restoration O'Brien returned to Ireland. On 11 July 1662 Charles II created him Baron Moyarta and Viscount Clare. The honour was intended for his grandson Daniel, into whose hands the estate was directly conveyed. Lord Clare, as he now was, attended the House of Lords during the Irish Parliament 1661–1666. He died in 1663 or in 1666 and was succeeded by his eldest surviving son, Connor.

Timeline
Age	Date	Event
0	1577, about	Born
11–12	1589	Mother died at Clare Castle.
20–21	1598, 14 Aug	Battle of the Yellow Ford won by Hugh Roe O'Donnell over Henry Bagenal.
21–22	1599	Tried to defend Ibrickane Castle against Hugh Roe O'Donnell but was wounded and taken captive.
22–23	1600	Married Catherine FitzGerald, widow of the 6th Viscount Fermoy, and the 3rd daughter of the 14th Earl of Desmond,
25–26	1603, 24 Mar	Accession of King James I, succeeding Queen Elizabeth I
26–27	1604, 1 July	Knighted
18–19	1613, 2 April	Elected MP for County Clare for the Parliament of 1613–1614.
47–48	1625, 27 Mar	Accession of King Charles I, succeeding King James I
54–55	1632, 12 Jan	Thomas Wentworth, later Earl of Stafford, appointed Lord Deputy of Ireland
39–40	1634, Nov	Elected MP for County Clare for the Irish Parliament of 1634–1635.
43–44	1638, 6 Aug	Eldest son Donogh died.
63–64	1641, 23 Oct	Outbreak of the Rebellion
65–66	1643, Nov	James Butler, 1st Marquess of Ormond appointed Lord Lieutenant of Ireland
71–72	1649, 30 Jan	King Charles I beheaded.
71–72	1649, 15 Aug	Oliver Cromwell landed in Dublin
73–74	1651, 27 Oct	Fall of Limerick
74–75	1652, 12 May	Fall of Galway
74–75	1652, 27 Jun	Gave his grandson as hostage at the surrender of Ross Castle by Muskerry.
82–83	1660, 29 May	Restoration of King Charles II
84–85	1662, 11 July	Created Viscount Clare
88–89	1666	Died.

== Notes and references ==
=== Sources ===
- Asch, Ronald G. (2004). "Wentworth, Thomas, first earl of Strafford (1593–1641)". In Matthew, Colin; Harrison, Brian (eds.). Oxford Dictionary of National Biography. Vol. 56. New York: Oxford University Press. pp. 142–157. ISBN 0-19-861408-X.
- Burke, Bernard (1883). A Genealogical History of the Dormant, Abeyant, Forfeited and Extinct Peerages of the British Empire (New ed.). London: Harrison. OCLC 499232768. – (for Thomond)
- Coffey, Diarmid (1914). O'Neill and Ormond – A Chapter of Irish History. Dublin: Maunsel & Company. OCLC 906164979.
- Cokayne, George Edward (1895). Complete Peerage of England, Scotland, Ireland, Great Britain and the United Kingdom, Extant, Extinct, or Dormant. Vol. VI (1st ed.). London: George Bell and Sons. OCLC 1180818801. – N to R (for Ormond)
- Cokayne, George Edward (1896). Complete Peerage of England, Scotland, Ireland, Great Britain and the United Kingdom, Extant, Extinct, or Dormant. Vol. VII (1st ed.). London: George Bell and Sons. OCLC 1180891114. – S to T (for Thomond)
- Cokayne, George Edward (1913). Gibbs, Vicary (ed.). The complete peerage of England, Scotland, Ireland, Great Britain and the United Kingdom, extant, extinct, or dormant. Vol. III (2nd ed.). London: St Catherine Press. OCLC 228661424. – Canonteign to Cutts (for Clare)
- Cunningham, Bernadette (October 2009). McGuire, James; Quinn, James (eds.). "O'Brien, Conor". Dictionary of Irish Biography.
- Cusack, Mary Frances (1871). A Compendium of Irish History. Boston: Patrick Donahoe. OCLC 873009963.
- Firth, Charles Harding (1894) [1st pub. 1698]. The Memoirs of Edmund Ludlow Lieutenant-General of the Horse in the Army of the Commonwealth of England 1625–1672. Vol. I. Oxford: Clarendon Press. OCLC 1113948779. – 1625 to 1655
- Fryde, Edmund Boleslaw; Greenway, D. E.; Porter, S.; Roy, I., eds. (1986). Handbook of British Chronology. Royal Historical Society Guides and Handbooks, No. 2 (3rd ed.). London: Offices of the Royal Historical Society. ISBN 0-86193-106-8. – (for timeline)
- Harris, William Torrey (1930). Webster's New International Dictionary of the English Language. Springfield, Massachusetts: G. & C. Merriam Company. OCLC 1158283506.
- Hayes-McCoy, Gerard Anthony (1976). "Chapter IV: The Completion of the Tudor Conquest and the Advance of the Counterreformation". In Moody, Theodore William; Martin, F. X.; Byrne, Francis John (eds.). A New History of Ireland. Vol. III. Oxford: Oxford University Press. pp. 94–141. ISBN 978-0-19-820242-4. – 1534–1691
- House of Commons (1878). Return. Members of Parliament – Part II. Parliaments of Great Britain, 1705–1796. Parliaments of the United Kingdom, 1801–1874. Parliaments and Conventions of the Estates of Scotland, 1357–1707. Parliaments of Ireland, 1599–1800. London: His/Her Majesty's Stationery Office. OCLC 13112546.
- Lodge, John (1789). Archdall, Mervyn (ed.). The Peerage of Ireland or, A Genealogical History of the Present Nobility of that Kingdom. Vol. II. Dublin: James Moore. OCLC 264906028. – Earls (under Inchiquin)
- O'Brien, Donough (1949). History of the O'Briens from Boroimhe. Batsford: self-published. OCLC 1157152182.
- O'Donoghue, John (1860). Historical Memoir of the O'Briens. Dublin: Hodges Smith & Co. OCLC 316665132.
- O'Hart, John (1892). Irish Pedigrees: Or, the Origin and Stem of the Irish Nation. Vol. I (5th ed.). Dublin: James Duffy & Co. OCLC 7239210. – Irish stem
- Ohlmeyer, Jane (2004). "O'Brien, Daniel, first viscount Clare (1577?–1663)". In Matthew, Colin; Harrison, Brian (eds.). Oxford Dictionary of National Biography. Vol. 41. New York: Oxford University Press. pp. 358–359. ISBN 0-19-861391-1.
- Ó Siochrú, Micheál (October 2009). McGuire, James; Quinn, James (eds.). "O'Brien, Sir Daniel". Dictionary of Irish Biography.
- Pollard, Albert Frederick (1895a). "O'Brien, Daniel, first Viscount Clare (1577?–1663)". In Lee, Sidney (ed.). Dictionary of National Biography. Vol. XLI. New York: MacMillan and Co. pp. 310–311. OCLC 8544105.
- Pollard, Albert Frederick (1895b). "O'Brien, Donough, Baron of Ibrickan and fourth Earl of Thomond (d. 1624)". In Lee, Sidney (ed.). Dictionary of National Biography. Vol. XLI. New York: MacMillan and Co. pp. 312–314. OCLC 8544105.
- Warner, Ferdinand (1768). History of the Rebellion and Civil-War in Ireland. Vol. I. Dublin: James William. OCLC 82770539. – 1641 to 1643

Parliament of Ireland
Preceded by Sir Turlogh O'Brien; Boetius Clancy	Member of Parliament for Clare County; 1613–1614; With: Sir Boetius Clancy	Succeeded by Barnabas O'Brien; Sir Boetius Clancy
Preceded by Barnabas O'Brien; Sir Boetius Clancy	Member of Parliament for Clare County; 1634–1635; With: Sir Boetius Clancy	Succeeded by Dermot O'Brien; Donough O'Brien
Peerage of Ireland
New creation	Viscount Clare; 1662–1663	Succeeded by Connor O'Brien
