= Barnabas O'Brien, 6th Earl of Thomond =

Irish noble

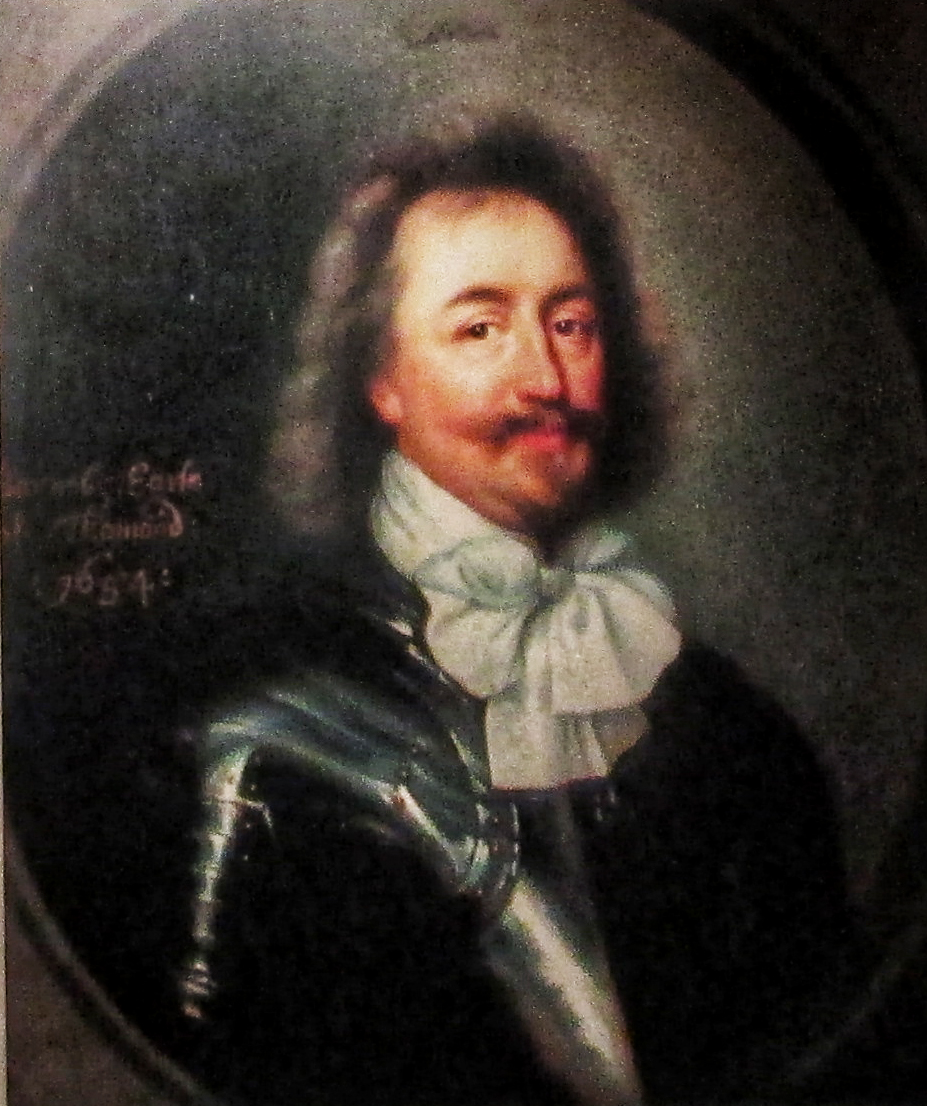
Barnabas O'Brien, 6th Earl of Thomond

Barnabas O'Brien, 6th Earl of Thomond (1590-November 1657), was Chief of Clan O'Brien and son of Donogh O'Brien, 4th Earl of Thomond. He succeeded his elder brother as earl in 1639 and was made lord-lieutenant of Co. Clare in 1640–41. He had his rents seized, 1644; admitted a parliamentary garrison to Bunratty Castle and went to England: joined Charles I; successfully petitioned parliament for £2,000 spent in the parliamentary cause.

== Life ==
Barnabas entered the Irish House of Commons in 1613 as member for Coleraine. In 1634 he was returned for both County Clare (as a colleague of his uncle, Daniel O'Brien, afterwards 1st Viscount Clare) and Carlow but, being compelled to go to England for a time, new writs were issued for fresh elections.

In 1639 Barnabas succeeded his brother Henry as sixth earl of Thomond, and applied for the governorship of Clare, which Thomas Wentworth, Earl of Strafford refused him on the ground that his conduct differed entirely from that of his brother, and that he deserved nothing. Nevertheless, he was made Lord-lieutenant and Custos Rotulorum in 1640–41. When the Irish Rebellion of 1641 broke out he attempted to maintain neutrality, in spite of the support given by his kinsmen to the confederation, and did not sign the oath of association in 1641.

Thomond lived quietly on his lands in Clare, and was in frequent communication with James Butler, 1st Duke of Ormonde. In 1644 the council of the confederation forbade Thomond's agents to collect his rents, and even formed a scheme for seizing his chief stronghold at Bunratty, which his uncle, Sir Daniel O'Brien, was appointed to carry out. Thereupon Thomond, finding that no troops were forthcoming wherewith to defend Bunratty Castle, entered into negotiations with the parliamentarians, in spite of the remonstrances of Edward Somerset, Earl of Glamorgan. At the instigation of his kinsman, Murrough O'Brien, 1st Earl of Inchiquin, he admitted a parliamentary garrison to the castle, and went to live in England.

Thomond soon joined King Charles I at Oxford, and received, on 3 May 1645, a patent creating him Marquis of Billing in Northamptonshire. But the patent never passed under the great seal.

A few years later Thomond petitioned parliament for the recovery of £2,000 which had been seized in Bunratty, pleading that his real estate was in the hands of the Irish rebels, and that he had spent £16,000 on the parliamentary cause. His petition was granted, and he apparently gave no cause for suspicion to the Commonwealth or protectorate, for his son Henry's request, on 15 December 1657, for the governorship of Thomond was favourably received by Henry Cromwell. Thomond died in November 1657, and his will, dated 1 July 1657, in which he left some bequests to Great Billing, was proved in England on 6 February, and in Ireland on 28 April of the same year.

Pollard mentions that the authors of Lodge's Peerage (ed Archdall) maintained that Thomond was of strict loyalty, religion, and honour, and that his lands were taken from him during the rebellion through the unnatural conduct of his nearest relations; it was also believed that he gave up Bunratty at Ormonde's instigation.

== Family ==
Barnabas was the second son of Donogh O'Brien, 4th Earl of Thomond, by his second wife, Elizabeth, fourth daughter of Gerald FitzGerald, 11th Earl of Kildare. His elder brother, Henry O'Brien, 5th Earl of Thomond, who succeeded to the earldom on his father's death in 1624, was a strenuous adherent of the government in Ireland, was warmly commended by Thomas Wentworth, Earl of Strafford for his loyalty, and died without male issue in 1639.

Barnabas married Anne, youngest daughter of Sir George Fermor and divorced wife of Robert Crichton, 8th Lord Crichton of Sanquhar (who was hanged for murder in 1612). They had one son, Henry O'Brien, 7th Earl of Thomond, his successor (1621–1691); and one daughter, Penelope, who married Henry Mordaunt, 2nd Earl of Peterborough.

== Notes ==
Peerage of Ireland
Preceded by Henry O'Brien	Earl of Thomond; 1639–1657	Succeeded by Henry O'Brien
