= Custos Rotulorum of Clare =

The Custos Rotulorum of Clare was the highest civil officer in County Clare. The position was later combined with that of Lord Lieutenant of Clare.

== Incumbents ==
- 1640–?: Sir Barnabas O'Brien, 6th Earl of Thomond
- 1650–?: George Lane of Tulsk, Roscommon
- 1762–1767: William O'Brien, 4th Earl of Inchiquin
- bef.1778–?1808 Murrough O'Brien, 1st Marquess of Thomond (5th Earl of Inchiquin, died 1808)
- 1808–1832: Henry Conyngham, 1st Marquess Conyngham

For later custodes rotulorum, see Lord Lieutenant of Clare
