= Daniel O'Brien, 3rd Viscount Clare =

Irish politician and soldier (died 1691)

Daniel O'Brien
- Viscount Clare
- Tenure: 1670–1691
- Successor: Daniel, 4th Viscount Clare
- Died: 1691
- Spouse: Philadelphia Lennart
- Issue Detail: Daniel, Charles & others
- Father: Connor, 2nd Viscount Clare
- Mother: Honora O'Brien

Daniel O'Brien, 3rd Viscount Clare (died 1691), was with King Charles II in exile during the interregnum. At the Restoration, he obtained the title of Viscount Clare for his grandfather and full restoration of the family's lands. At the Glorious Revolution he supported James II, sitting in the Patriot Parliament and fighting for him at the Battle of the Boyne. He was in consequence attainted as a Jacobite.

== Birth and origins ==
Family tree

Daniel O'Brien with wife, parents, and other selected relatives. (Note: This family tree is based on a pedigree of the viscounts of Clare, as well as genealogies of the viscounts of Clare Also see the lists of children in the text.)

Daniel; 1st Viscount; 1577–1666	Catherine; FitzGerald
Connor; 2nd Viscount; 1605–1670	Honora; O'Brien
Daniel; 3rd Viscount d. 1691	Philadelphia; Lennart
Daniel; 4th Viscount d. 1693	Charles; 5th Viscount; 1673–1706	Charlotte; Bulkeley
Charles; 6th Viscount; 1699–1761	Geneviève; Gautier

Legend

XXX	Subject of the article	XXX	Viscounts; Clare

Daniel was born roughly about 1620, probably at Carrigaholt Castle, County Clare, his parents' habitual residence. He was the only son of Connor O'Brien (c. 1605 – 1670) and his wife Honora O'Brien. At the time of his birth, his father was the heir apparent of his grandfather, O'Brien of Carrigaholt, who was a younger brother of Donogh O'Brien, 4th Earl of Thomond. His father's family was the senior branch of the O'Briens, a Gaelic Irish dynasty that descended from Brian Boru, medieval high king of Ireland.

His mother's family were the O'Briens of Duagh, County Kerry, a cadet branch of the O'Briens that descended from Donal, younger brother of Donough O'Brien, 2nd Earl of Thomond. Daniel was one of six siblings, who are listed in his father's article.

== Early life ==
O'Brien lived as a young man through the Irish Rebellion of 1641, the Irish Confederate Wars, and the Cromwellian conquest of Ireland, probably fighting under the command of his father and grandfather. He probably was the "Daniel O'Bryan" who was given as hostage to General Edmund Ludlow at the surrender of Ross Castle on 27 June 1652.

He went with his father and grandfather into French exile and seems to have been a courtier at Charles II's court in exile. At the Restoration in 1660 he returned to England or Ireland with his father and grandfather. On 11 July 1662 Charles II created his grandfather Baron Moyarta and Viscount Clare. The honour was intended for him, Daniel, into whose hands the estate was directly conveyed. His grandfather died in 1663 or in 1666, and his father succeed as 2nd Viscount and he gained the courtesy title of Baron Moyarta.

== Marriage and children ==
He married Philadelphia Lennard, sister of the Thomas, Earl of Sussex.

Daniel and Philadelphia had three children:

1. Honora O'Brien
2. Daniel (died 1693), 4th viscount died unmarried in French exile
3. Charles (1673–1706), 5th viscount, who died of wounds received at the Battle of Ramillies fighting for the French

== Later life ==
At his father's death in 1670 Moyarta succeeded as the 3rd Viscount Clare.

In August 1674 Clare, as he was now, was appointed commander of a newly raised regiment of foot, Clare's Regiment of Foot, an Irish regiment in the Dutch States Army. He was replaced within twelve months by Sir John Fenwick. From July 1751 on this regiment would be known as the 5th Regiment of Foot.

In 1689 he sat in the House of Lords of the Patriot Parliament.

During the War of the Two Kings, Clare served with the Jacobite Irish Army loyal to James II. He was the colonel of Clare's Dragoons, which he led against William of Orange at the Battle of the Boyne (1 July 1690) and was later exiled in France as part of the Flight of the Wild Geese.

In 1689 James II of England appointed Clare, as he was now, together with Boileau as joint governors of Cork. On 11 August Clare imprisoned the Protestants of the city in St Peter, Christchurch, and the courthouses. They were later detained in the castles of Blarney and Macroom. In 1690 Clare fought for James at the Battle of the Boyne.

== Death and timeline ==
Daniel died in 1691. He was outlawed on 11 May 1691.

Timeline
As his birth date is uncertain, so are all his ages.
Age	Date	Event
0	1620, estimate	Born
4–5	1625, 27 Mar	Accession of King Charles I, succeeding King James I
11–12	1632, 12 Jan	Thomas Wentworth, later Earl of Stafford, appointed Lord Deputy of Ireland
20–21	1641, 23 Oct	Outbreak of the Rebellion
22–23	1643, Nov	James Butler, 1st Marquess of Ormond appointed Lord Lieutenant of Ireland
28–29	1649, 30 Jan	King Charles I beheaded.
28–29	1649, 15 Aug	Oliver Cromwell landed in Dublin
31–32	1652, 12 May	Fall of Galway
31–32	1652, 27 Jun	Served as hostage at the surrender of Ross Castle by Muskerry.
39–40	1660, 29 May	Restoration of King Charles II
45–46	1670	Father died, succeeded as 3rd earl
68–69	1689, 13 Feb	Accession of William and Mary, succeeding King James II
70–71	1691	Died

== Notes and references ==
=== Sources ===
- Asch, Ronald G. (2004). "Wentworth, Thomas, first earl of Strafford (1593–1641)". In Matthew, Colin; Harrison, Brian (eds.). Oxford Dictionary of National Biography. Vol. 56. New York: Oxford University Press. pp. 142–157. ISBN 0-19-861408-X.
- Burke, Bernard (1883). A Genealogical History of the Dormant, Abeyant, Forfeited and Extinct Peerages of the British Empire (New ed.). London: Harrison. OCLC 499232768.
- Coffey, Diarmid (1914). O'Neill and Ormond – A Chapter of Irish History. Dublin: Maunsel & Company. OCLC 906164979.
- Cokayne, George Edward (1895). Complete Peerage of England, Scotland, Ireland, Great Britain and the United Kingdom, Extant, Extinct, or Dormant. Vol. VI (1st ed.). London: George Bell and Sons. OCLC 1180818801. – N to R
- Cokayne, George Edward (1896). Complete Peerage of England, Scotland, Ireland, Great Britain and the United Kingdom, Extant, Extinct, or Dormant. Vol. VII (1st ed.). London: George Bell and Sons. OCLC 1180891114. – S to T (for Thomond)
- Cokayne, George Edward (1913). Gibbs, Vicary (ed.). The complete peerage of England, Scotland, Ireland, Great Britain and the United Kingdom, extant, extinct, or dormant. Vol. III (2nd ed.). London: St Catherine Press. OCLC 228661424. – Canonteign to Cutts (for Clare)
- Cusack, Mary Frances (1871). A Compendium of Irish History. Boston: Patrick Donahoe. OCLC 873009963.
- Davis, Thomas (1893). The Patriot Parliament of 1689: With its Statutes Votes and Proceedings (3rd ed.). London: T Fisher Unwin. OCLC 559525943.
- Firth, Charles Harding (1894) [1st pub. 1698]. The Memoirs of Edmund Ludlow Lieutenant-General of the Horse in the Army of the Commonwealth of England 1625–1672. Vol. I. Oxford: Clarendon Press. OCLC 1113948779. – 1625 to 1655
- Fryde, Edmund Boleslaw; Greenway, D. E.; Porter, S.; Roy, I., eds. (1986). Handbook of British Chronology. Royal Historical Society Guides and Handbooks, No. 2 (3rd ed.). London: Offices of the Royal Historical Society. ISBN 0-86193-106-8. – (for timeline)
- Gibson, Charles Bernard (1861). The History of the County and City of Cork. Vol. II. London: Thomas C. Newby. OCLC 1046522071. – 1603 to 1860
- House of Lords (1779). Journals of the House of Lords (PDF). Vol. I. Dublin: William Sleater. OCLC 35009219. – 1634 to 1699
- O'Brien, Donough (1949). History of the O'Briens from Boroimhe. Batsford: self-published. OCLC 1157152182.
- O'Donoghue, John (1860). Historical Memoir of the O'Briens. Dublin: Hodges Smith & Co. OCLC 316665132.
- O'Hart, John (1892). Irish Pedigrees: Or, the Origin and Stem of the Irish Nation. Vol. I (5th ed.). Dublin: James Duffy & Co. OCLC 7239210. – Irish stem
- Ohlmeyer, Jane (2004). "O'Brien, Daniel, first viscount Clare (1577?–1663)". In Matthew, Colin; Harrison, Brian (eds.). Oxford Dictionary of National Biography. Vol. 41. New York: Oxford University Press. pp. 358–359. ISBN 0-19-861391-1.
- Ó Siochrú, Micheál (October 2009). McGuire, James; Quinn, James (eds.). "O'Brien, Sir Daniel". Dictionary of Irish Biography.
- Smith, Charles (1893a) [1st pub. 1750]. The Ancient and Present State of the County and City of Cork. Vol. I. Cork: Guy and Co. OCLC 559463963. – Topography
- Smith, Charles (1893b) [1st pub. 1750]. The Ancient and Present State of the County and City of Cork. Vol. II. Cork: Guy and Co. OCLC 559463963. – History
- Warner, Ferdinand (1768). History of the Rebellion and Civil-War in Ireland. Vol. I. Dublin: James William. OCLC 82770539. – 1641 to 1643
- Windele, John (1839). Historical and Descriptive Notices of the City of Cork and its Vicinity. Cork: Luke H. Bolster. OCLC 20432940.

Peerage of Ireland
Preceded by Connor O'Brien	Viscount Clare; 1670–1691	Succeeded by Daniel O'Brien
