= Lord Clare =

Lord Clare may refer to:

- any of the individuals who have held the title Earl of Clare or Viscount Clare
- Robert Nugent, 1st Earl Nugent (1702–1788), who was created Viscount Clare in 1767, and thus styled "Lord Clare" until 1776
