= Muircheartach Óg Ó Súilleabháin =

- Born: 1710
- Died: 1754 (aged 43–44)
- Military career
- Unit: Clare's Dragoons

Muircheartach Óg Ó Súilleabháin (c. 1710 – 1754), was a soldier and smuggler.

Ó Súilleabháin was a native of the Beara Peninsula. He was serving as a soldier in Spain by 1739, and fought with the Clare's Dragoons at Fontenoy in 1745. He was a popular figure in local tradition down to recent times.
