= Bunratty Castle =

Castle in Ireland

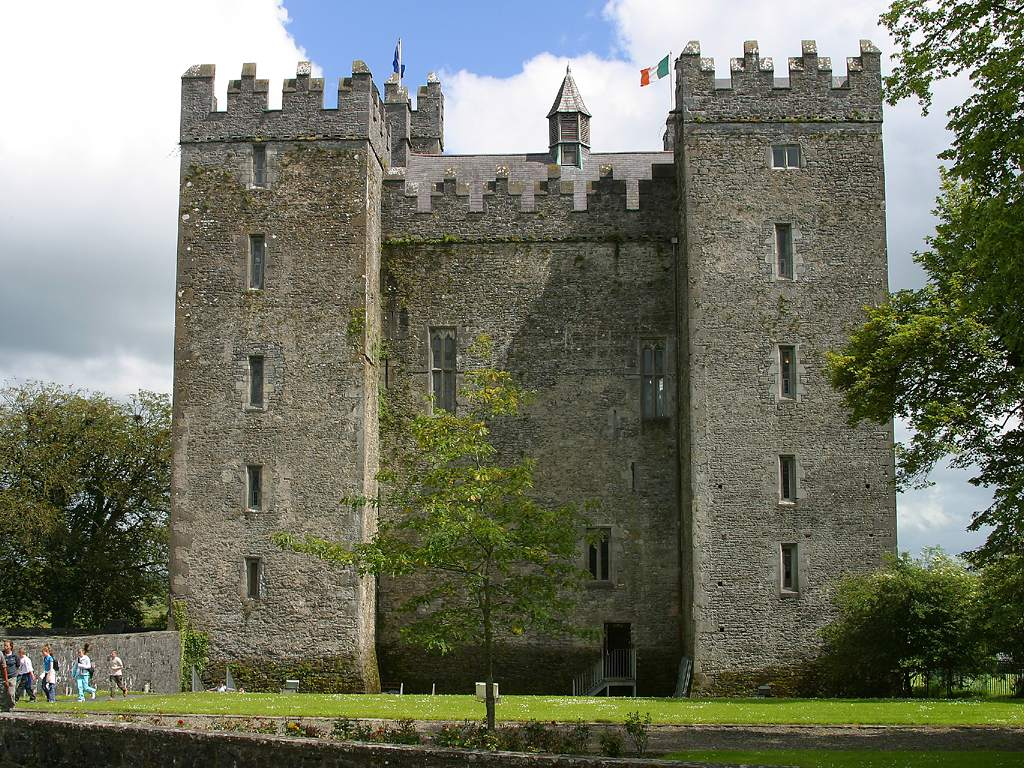

- Location within Ireland
- 52°41′48″N 8°48′42″W
- Location: Bunratty village, County Clare, Ireland

History
- Built: c. 1425

Site notes
- Restored: 1956
- Restored by: 7th Viscount Gort
- Governing body: Clare County Council

National monument of Ireland
- Reference no.: 478

Bunratty Castle (Irish: Caisleán Bhun Raithe) is a large 15th-century tower house in County Clare, Ireland. It is located in the centre of Bunratty village, by the N18 road between Limerick and Ennis, near Shannon Town and its airport.

== Name ==
The name Bunratty means "mouth of the Ratty River" in Irish. This is another name for the Owenogarney River, which empties into the Shannon Estuary after flowing past the village and castle.

== Earlier structures ==
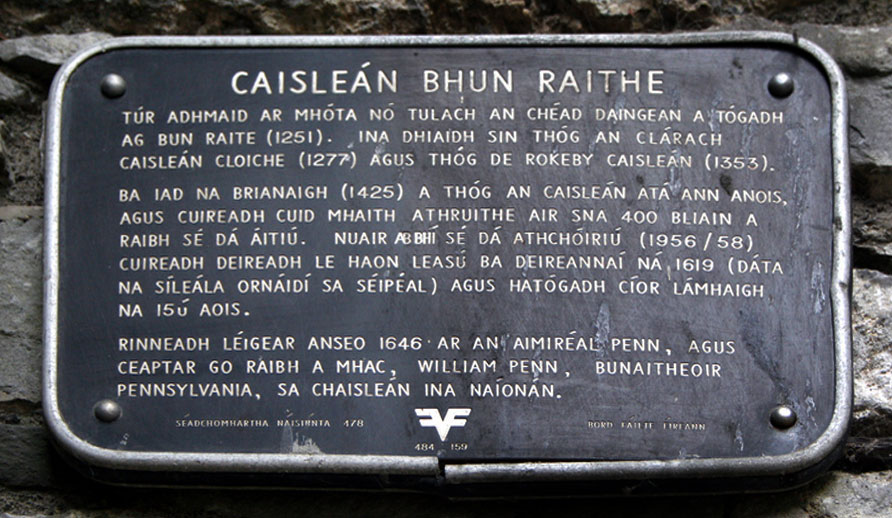
An Irish language plaque at Bunratty Castle

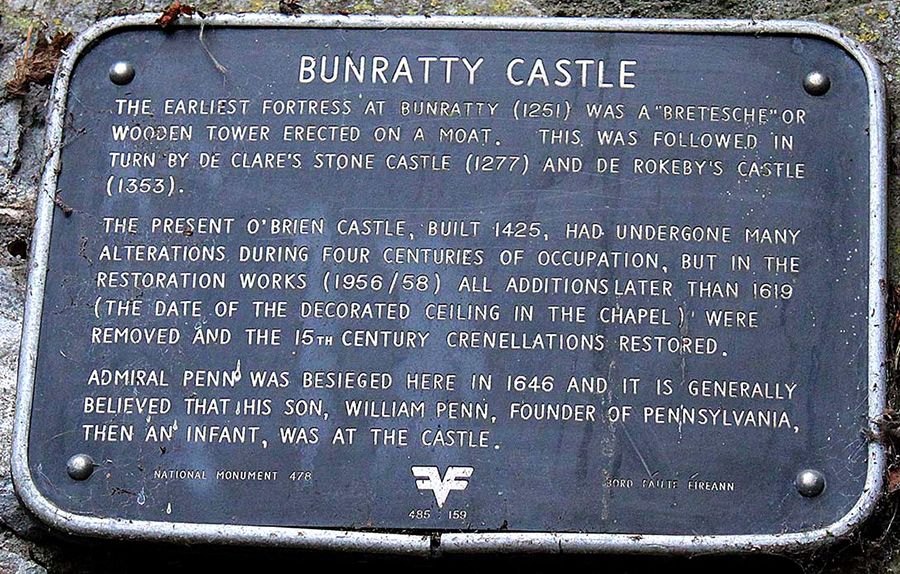
Bunratty Castle Plaque in English

The first recorded settlement at the site may have been a Norse trading camp reported in the Annals of the Four Masters to have been destroyed by Brian Boru in 977. According to local tradition, such a camp was located on a rise southwest of the current castle. Since no remains of this settlement have been found, its exact location is unknown and its existence is not proven.

Around 1250, King Henry III of England granted the cantred or district of Tradraighe (or Tradree) to Robert De Muscegros, who in 1251 cut down around 200 trees in the King's wood at Cratloe. These may have been used to construct a motte and bailey castle, which would have been the first castle at Bunratty, but again the exact position of this is unknown. A later reference in the state papers, dating to 1253 gives de Muscegros the right to hold markets and an annual fair at Bunratty. It has thus been assumed that the site was the centre of early Norman control in south-eastern Clare. Early 19th-century scholars put the structure to the north-west of the current castle. When a hotel was constructed there in 1959, John Hunt excavated the area and thought the remains to be that of a gun emplacement from the Confederate Wars (see below). This river, alongside the castle, flows into the nearby Shannon estuary.

These lands were later handed back to (or taken back by) King Henry III and granted to Thomas De Clare, a descendant of Strongbow in 1276. De Clare built the first stone structure on the site (the second castle). This castle was occupied from ca. 1278 to 1318 and consisted of a large single stone tower with lime white walls. It stood close to the river, on or near the site of the present Bunratty Castle. In the late 13th century, Bunratty had about 1,000 inhabitants. The castle was attacked several times by the O'Briens (or O'Brians) and their allies. In 1284, while De Clare was away in England, the site was captured and destroyed. On his return, in 1287, De Clare had the site rebuilt and a 140-yard (130 m) long fosse built around it. The castle was again attacked but it did not fall until 1318. In that year a major battle was fought at Dysert O'Dea as part of the Irish Bruce Wars, in which Richard de Clare was killed. Lady De Clare, on learning this, fled from Bunratty to Limerick after burning castle and town. The De Clare family never returned to the area and the remains of the castle eventually collapsed. As the stones were probably used for other local construction works, no traces remain of this second castle.

In the 14th century, Limerick was an important port for the English Crown. To guard access via the Shannon estuary against attacks from the Irish, the site was once again occupied. In 1353, Sir Thomas de Rokeby led an English army to conquer the MacNamaras and MacCarthys. A new castle (the third) was built at Bunratty, but once again, its exact location is unknown. Local tradition holds that it stood at the site where the Bunratty Castle Hotel was later constructed. The new structure was hardly finished before it was captured by the Irish. Documents show that in 1355, King Edward III of England released Thomas Fitzjohn Fitzmaurice from prison in Limerick. He had been charged with letting the castle fall into the hands of Murtough O’Brien whilst serving as a Governor (Captain) of Bunratty.

== Current structure ==
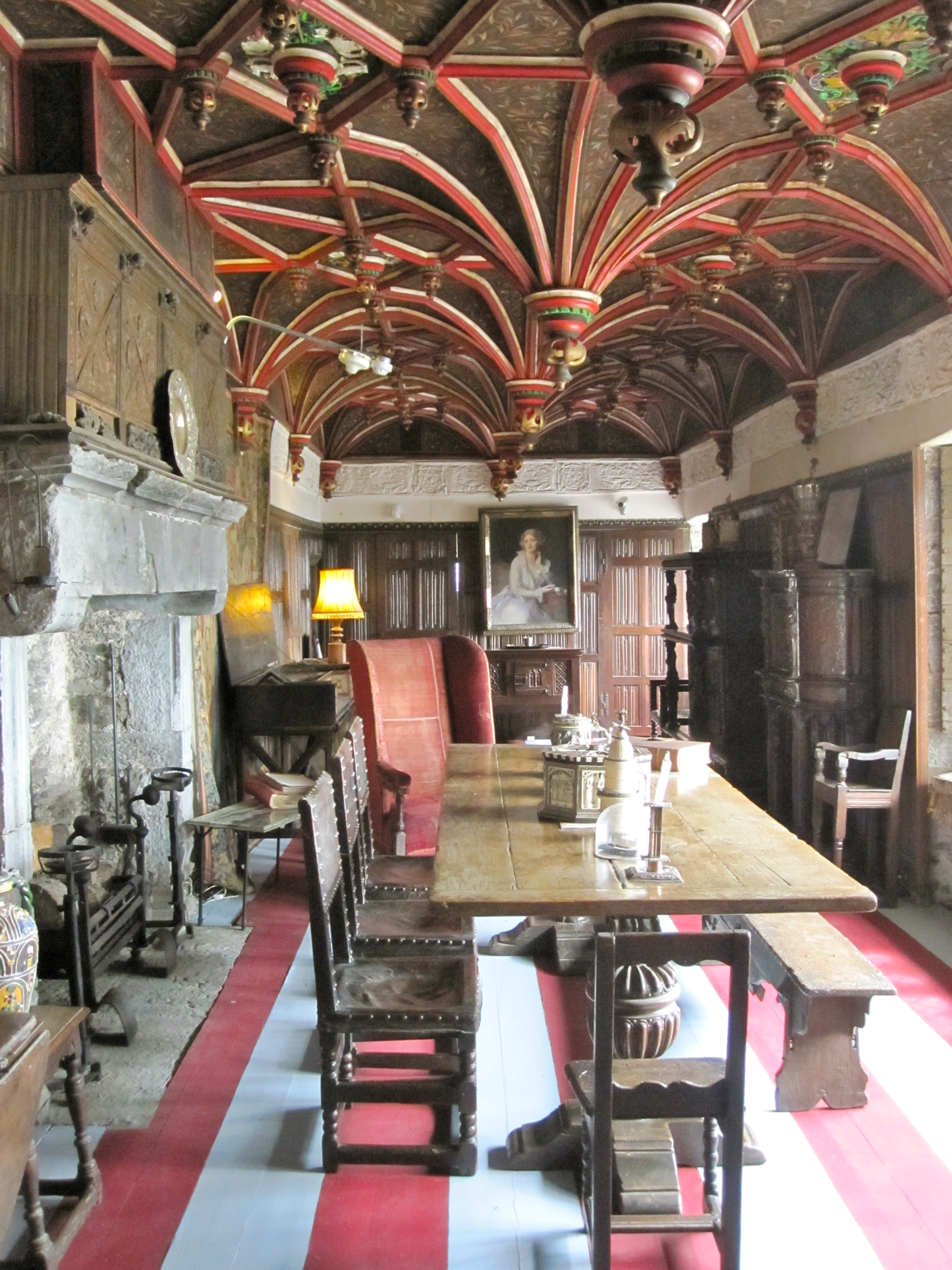
South solar in Bunratty Castle

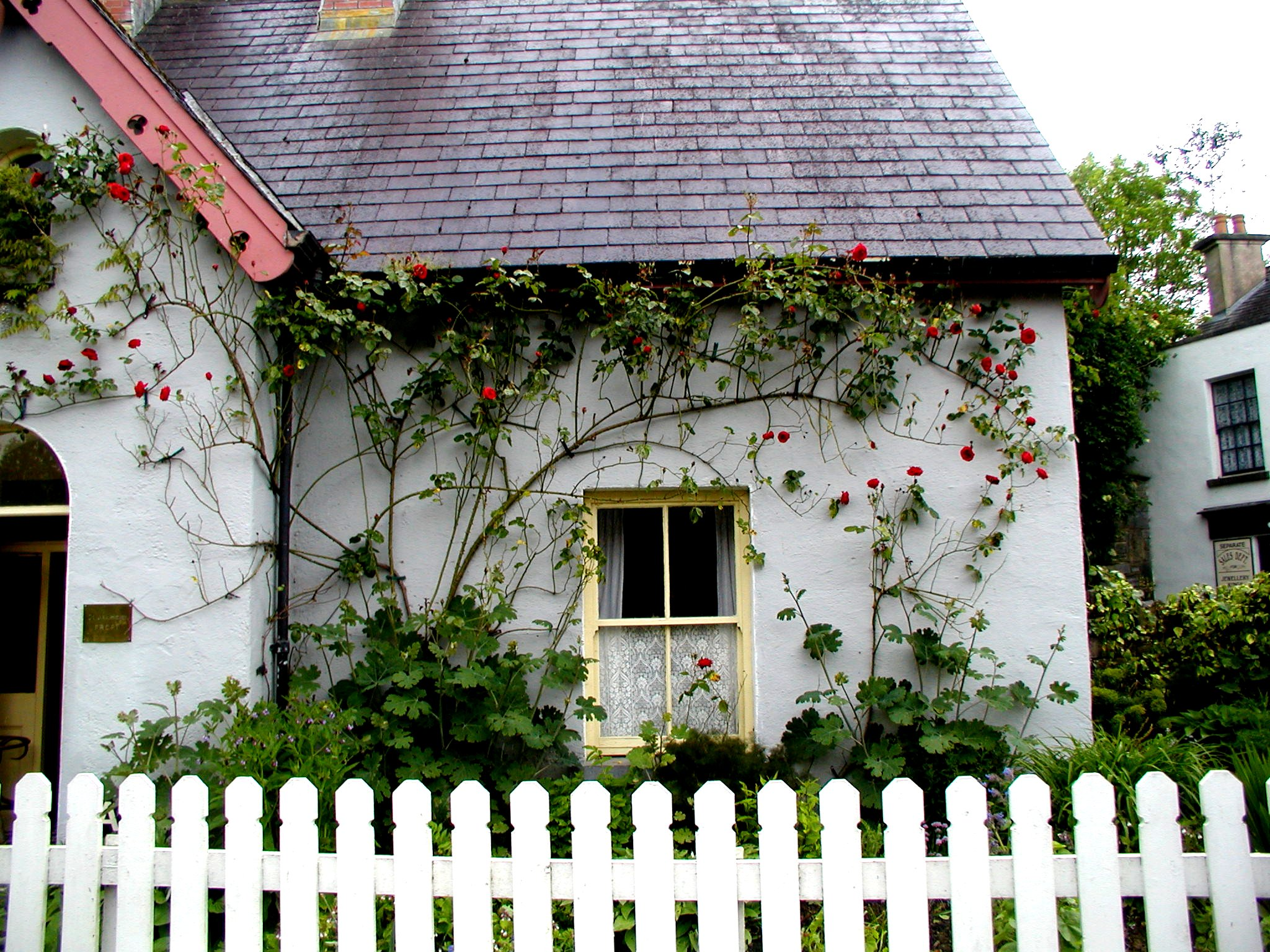
Rose Cottage at the Folk Park

Building of the fourth castle, the present structure, started around 1450. Its builder may have been one Maccon Sioda MacNamara, chieftain of Clann Cuilein (i.e. the MacNamaras). He died before the castle was completed which happened under his son Sean Finn (died in 1467). At around 1500, Bunratty Castle came into the hands of the O'Briens (or O'Brians), the most powerful clan in Munster and later Earls of Thomond. They expanded the site and eventually made it their chief seat, moving it there from Ennis.

In 1558, the castle—now noted as one of the principal strongholds of Thomond—was taken by Thomas Radclyffe, the Lord-Lieutenant of Ireland from Donal O'Brien of Duagh, last King of Thomond (died 1579), and given to Donal's nephew, Connor O'Brien. Donogh O'Brien, Conor's son, may have been the one to move the seat of the family from Clonroad (Ennis) to Bunratty. He made various improvements to the castle including putting a new lead roof on it.

During the Confederate Wars set off by the Irish Rebellion of 1641, Lord Forbes, commanding forces of the English Long Parliament, was allowed by the then Lord Barnabas O'Brien to occupy Bunratty in 1646. Barnabas did not want to commit to either side in the struggle, playing off royalists, rebels and roundheads against each other. He left for England, where he joined King Charles. Defence of the castle, whose position allowed those holding it to blockade maritime access to Limerick (held by the Confederates) and the river Shannon, was in the hands of Rear-Admiral Penn, the father of William Penn, founder of Pennsylvania. After a long siege, the Confederates took the castle. Penn surrendered but was allowed to sail away to Kinsale.

Barnabas O'Brien died in 1657, but had apparently leased out the castle to one "John Cooper", likely the same person married to Máire ní Mahon of Leamaneh Castle, widow of another O'Brien, Conor (died 1651). Bunratty Castle remained property of the O'Briens and in the 1680s the castle was still the principal seat of the Earls of Thomond. In 1712, Henry, the 8th and last Earl of Thomond (1688–1741) sold Bunratty Castle and 472 acres (191 ha) of land to Thomas Amory for £225 and an annual rent of £120. Amory in turn sold the castle to Thomas Studdert who moved in ca. 1720.

The Studdert family left the castle (allowing it to fall into disrepair), to reside in the more comfortable and modern adjacent "Bunratty House" they had built in 1804.

For some time in the mid-19th century, the castle was used as a barracks by the Royal Irish Constabulary. In 1894, Bunratty was once again used by the Studdert family, as the seat of Captain Richard Studdert. In the late 19th century, the roof of the Great Hall collapsed.

In 1956, the castle was purchased and restored by the 7th Viscount Gort, with assistance from the Office of Public Works. He reroofed the castle and saved it from ruin. The castle was opened to the public in 1960, with sporting furniture, tapestries and works of art dating to around the 1600's.

In February 1984, Pat Nugent was discovered in the reception area of the castle, mortally wounded. In 2024 a renewed investigation into his death was opened by An Garda Siochana.

In 2023 the ownership of the castle was transferred, with the transfer of Shannon Heritage DAC, a division of Shannon Group, to Clare County Council. This was part of larger transfer of the tourism sites that the company formerly operated, including the transfer of the nearby King John's Castle to Limerick City Council, owing to losses sustained at the sites during the COVID-19 pandemic. Other sites included in the transfer to Clare County Council were Craggaunowen Bronze Age Park, Knappogue Castle & Walled Garden, and a retail unit operated by Shannon Heritage at the Cliffs of Moher.

== See also ==
- List of tourist attractions in Ireland

== Bibliography ==
- Christopher Lynch, Bunratty Castle, Volume 41 of The Irish Heritage Series, Eason 1984, ISBN 0900346566.
