= Charles O'Brien, 8th Earl of Thomond =

Irish earl and military officer in French service

The Right Honourable The Earl of Thomond
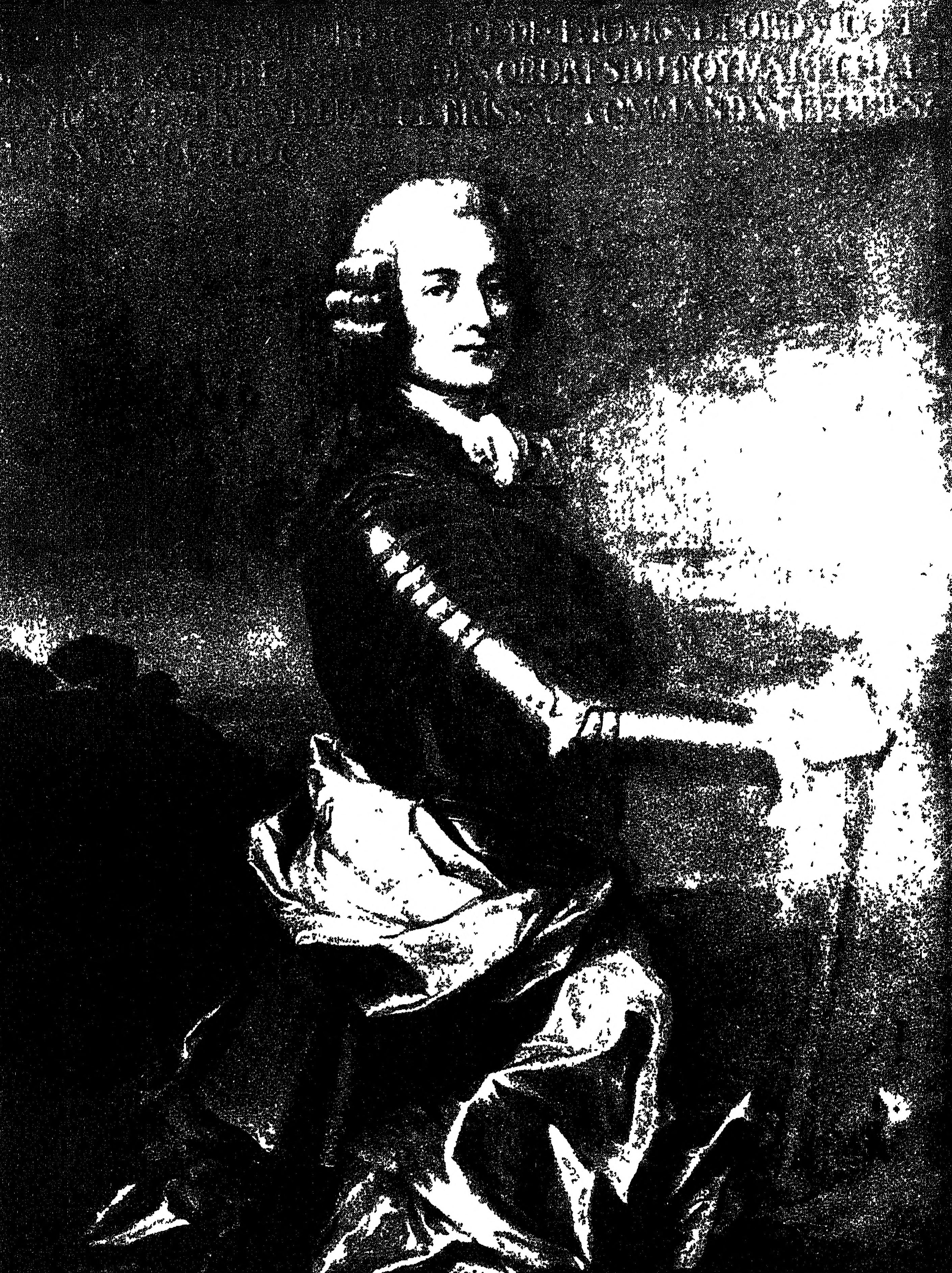
- As Marshal of France
- Born: Charles O'Brien; 17 March 1699
- Died: 9 September 1761 (aged 62)
- Spouse: Marie Genevieve Louise Gautier (after 1755)
- Children: Charles O'Brien, 9th Earl of Thomond; Antoinette, Duchess of Praslin; Lady Marie O'Brien
- Parent(s): Charles O'Brien, 5th Viscount Clare; Charlotte Bulkeley

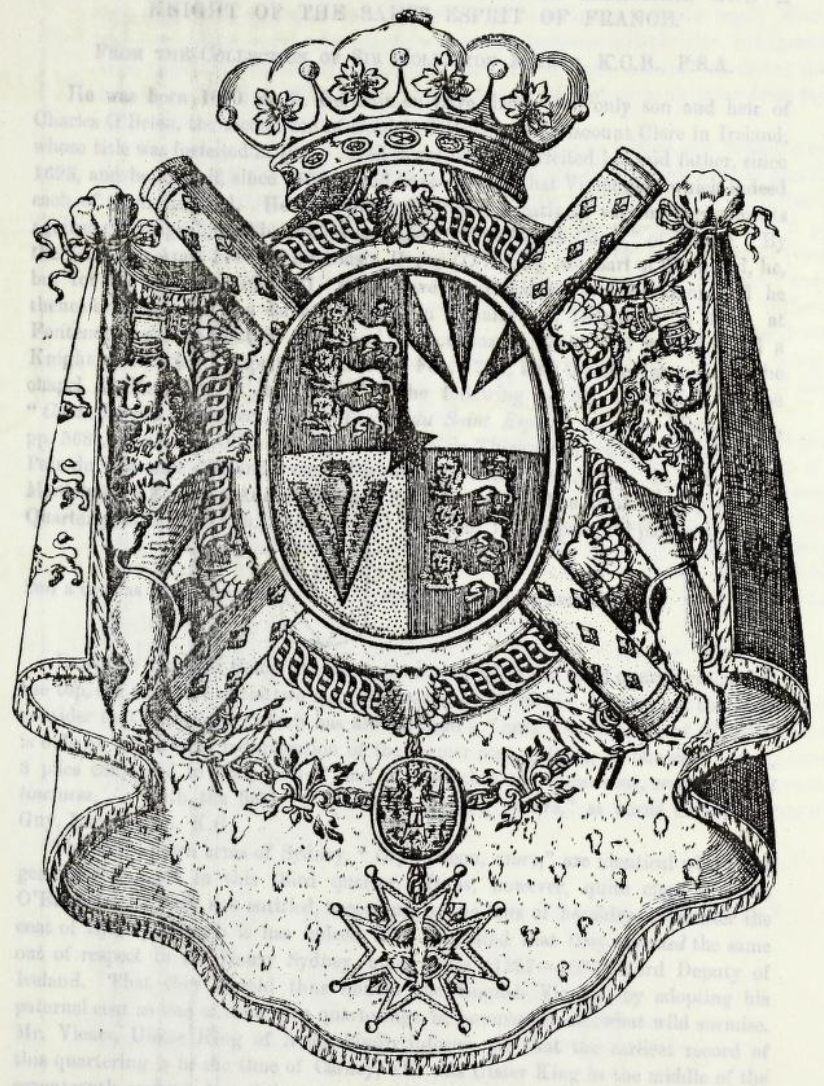
Bookplate with O'Brien's arms; note the marshal's batons and the collar of the Order of St Michael.

Charles O'Brien, (17 March 1699 – 9 September 1761), titular 6th Viscount Clare and later titular 8th Earl of Thomond, was an Irish military officer in French service (he was made a Marshal of France), known to posterity as the Maréchal de Thomond.

== Early life ==
Charles O'Brien was the son of Charles O'Brien, 5th Viscount Clare and Charlotte Bulkeley, the sister of Anne Bulkeley, second wife of James FitzJames, 1st Duke of Berwick and Marshal of France.

== Career ==
He fought for France against Spain in 1718 with the rank of colonel in the service of his father's regiment and later fought in the War of the Polish Succession in the siege of Philippsburg in June 1734, where he was wounded. He gained the rank of Maréchal de Camp in 1735 in the service of the King's Armies. O'Brien also fought in the Battle of Dettingen in 1743 and in the Battle of Fontenoy in 1745.

When his cousin, Henry O'Brien, 8th Earl of Thomond, offered the Thomond estates to Charles on the condition of his conversion to Protestantism, he refused, and so he willed them to the young son of William O'Brien, 4th Earl of Inchiquin, Murrough, with remainder to Percy Wyndham. Murrough's death in 1741 caused the reversion to become effective, with the estates leaving O'Brien hands.

O'Brien was invested as a Knight, L'Ordre du Saint-Esprit of France on 2 February 1746 at the chapel of Versailles, Île-de-France, France. He held the office of Governor of Neuf-Brisach in Alsace, and was Commander-in-Chief of the province of Languedoc. In 1757 he was made a Marshal of France.

== Personal life ==
In 1755, O'Brien married Marie Genevieve Louise Gautier, daughter of François Gautier, marquis de Chiffreville. They had three children:

- Charles O'Brien, 9th Earl of Thomond (1757–1774), who died unmarried.
- Lady Charlotte Antoinette Marie Septimanie O'Brien (1759–1808), married Antoine-César de Choiseul-Praslin, 3rd Duke of Praslin.
- Lady Marie O'Brien (1760–1786), who died unmarried.

Lord Thomond died on 9 September 1761, aged 62, at Montpellier, France. He was succeeded by his only son, Charles upon whose death the titles became extinct in 1774.

=== Descendants ===
Through his daughter Antoinette, he was a grandfather of Lucie-Virginie de Choiseul-Praslin (1794–1834), who married Charles Just de Beauvau, 4th Prince of Beauvau in 1815; and Charles-Félix de Choiseul-Praslin, 4th Duke of Praslin (1778–1841).

Peerage of Ireland
Preceded by Charles O'Brien	— TITULAR — Viscount Clare; Jacobite Peerage; 1699–1761	Succeeded by Charles O'Brien
Preceded by Henry O'Brien	— TITULAR — Earl of Thomond; Jacobite Peerage; 1741–1761	Succeeded by Charles O'Brien
