= Clare's Dragoons =

- Active: 8 August 1674 (first regiment); 1696-1745 France
- Allegiance: Charles II of England & France
- Type: Infantry

The Clare's Regiment, later known as Clare's Dragoons, was initially named O'Brien's Regiment after its originator Daniel O'Brien, 3rd Viscount Clare raised a mounted dragoon regiment during the Jacobite war. When Clare's Dragoons left Limerick with the Flight of the Wild Geese they became a regiment of infantry. Clare's Dragoons remained loyal to the dethroned James II of England and fought against the army of William III of England, during the Williamite War in Ireland.

== Clare's regiment's fate, the 5th Regiment of Foot ==
Commanded by	appointed	regiment known as	
Daniel O'Brian, Viscount Clare	8 August 1674	Clare's Regiment of Foot	Irish regiment of the Dutch States Army
Sir John Fenwick	2 August 1675	Fenwick's Regiment of Foot	Dutch Service
Henry Wisely or Wesley	11 September 1676	Wisely's Regiment of Foot	Dutch Service
Thomas Monk	10 December 1680	Monk's Regiment of Foot	Dutch Service to 1685
Thomas Tollemache	24 March 1688	Tollemache's Regiment of Foot	English Establishment from 1685
Edward Lloyd	1 May 1689	Lloyd's Regiment of Foot	
Thomas Fairfax	6 November 1694	Fairfax's Regiment of Foot	
Thomas Pearce	5 February 1704	Pearce's Regiment of Foot	
Sir John Cope	17 October 1732	Cope's Regiment of Foot	
Alexander Irvine	1737	Irvine's Regiment of Foot	

On 1 July 1751 a royal warrant provided that in future regiments would not be known by their colonels' names, but by their "number or rank". Accordingly, Lieutenant-General Irvine's Regiment was redesignated as the 5th Regiment of Foot.

- List of Regiments of Foot

== The Irish Brigade ==
The Irish Brigade was a brigade in the French army composed of Irish exiles. It was formed in May 1690 when five Jacobite regiments were sent from Ireland to France in return for a larger force of French infantry who were sent to fight in the Williamite war in Ireland. The Irish Brigade served as part of the French Army until 1792. These five Jacobite regiments, comprising about 5000 men, were named after their colonels: Lord Mountcashel, Butler, Feilding, O'Brien and Dillon. They were largely inexperienced and the French immediately disbanded Butler's and Feilding's, either incorporating their men into the remaining three regiments or sending them back to Ireland. The remaining three regiments, Mountcashel's, O'Brien's and Dillon's, formed the Irish Brigade which served the French during the remainder of the Nine Years War (1689–97).

== The Wild Geese ==
Under the terms of the Treaty of Limerick signed in October 1691, which ended the war between King James II and VII and King William III in Ireland, a separate force of 12,000 Jacobites arrived in France in an event known as the Flight of the Wild Geese. These were kept separate from the Irish Brigade and were formed into King James's own army in exile, albeit in the pay of France. Lord Dorrington's regiment, later Rooth or Roth, following the Treaty of Ryswick in 1698, was formed from the former 1st and 2nd battalions James II's Royal Irish Foot Guards formerly on the Irish establishment of Britain.

== Irish regiment in French service ==
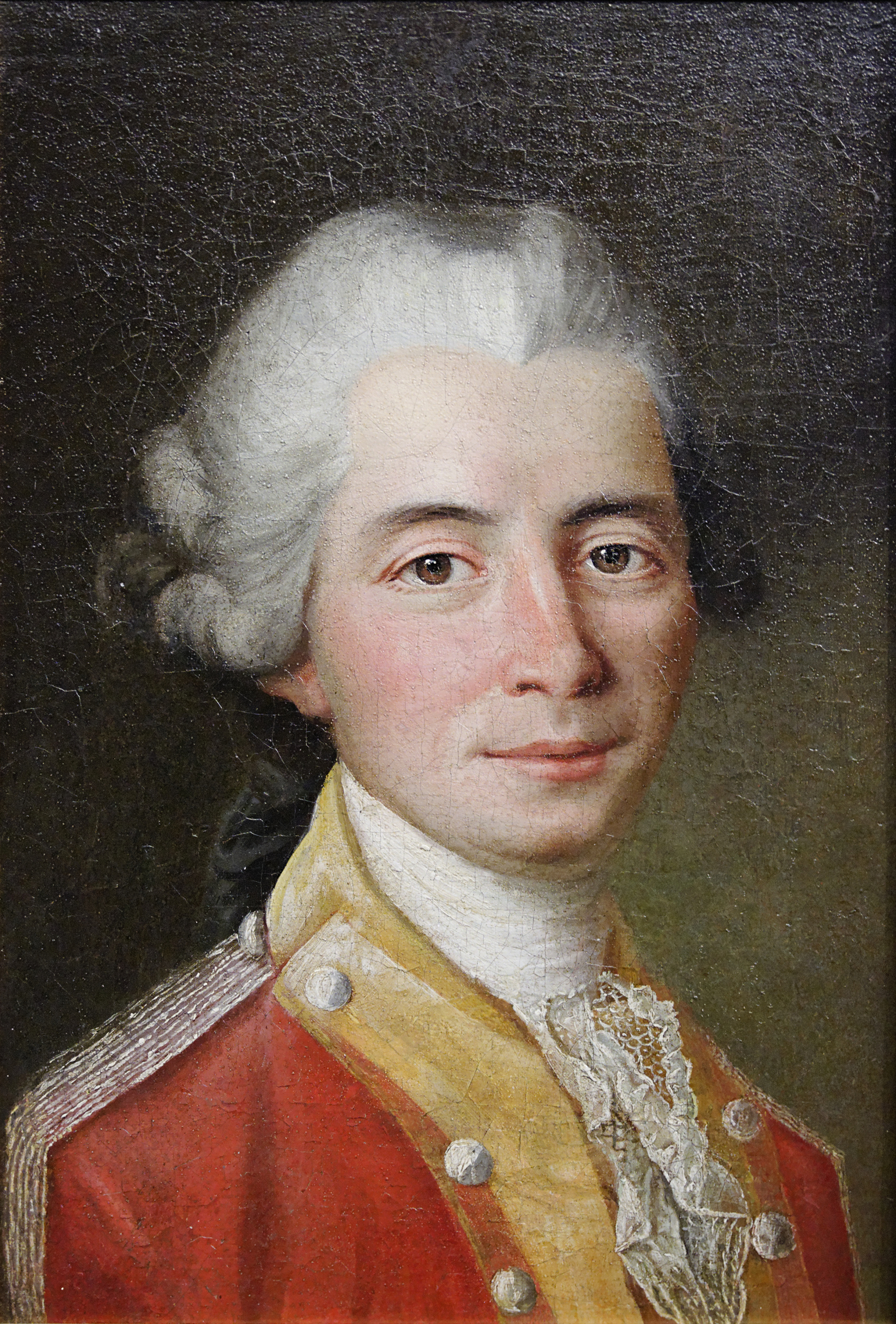
Officier du régime de Clare, vers 1767, Musée de l'Armée Thought to be the 10-year-old Charles O'Brien, 7th Viscount Clare

Le régiment de Clare was a French regiment of the Ancien Régime. It first entered service in France when it was shipped to France as part of a troop exchange in April 1690 during the Jacobite War forming part of Justin McCarthy, Viscount Mountcashel's Irish Brigade.

== Evolution of the Regiment ==
- 1696 : Created under Louis XIV with the name of régiment de Clare and known as the brigade irlandaise.
- 1706 : name changed to régiment O'Brien.
- 1720 : reverts to original name, régiment de Clare.
- 1775 : reformed and incorporated in the régiment de Berwick.

Note : another regiment, régiment de Bulkeley, briefly took the name of régiment de Clare between 1691 and 1693.

== Wars and Battles ==
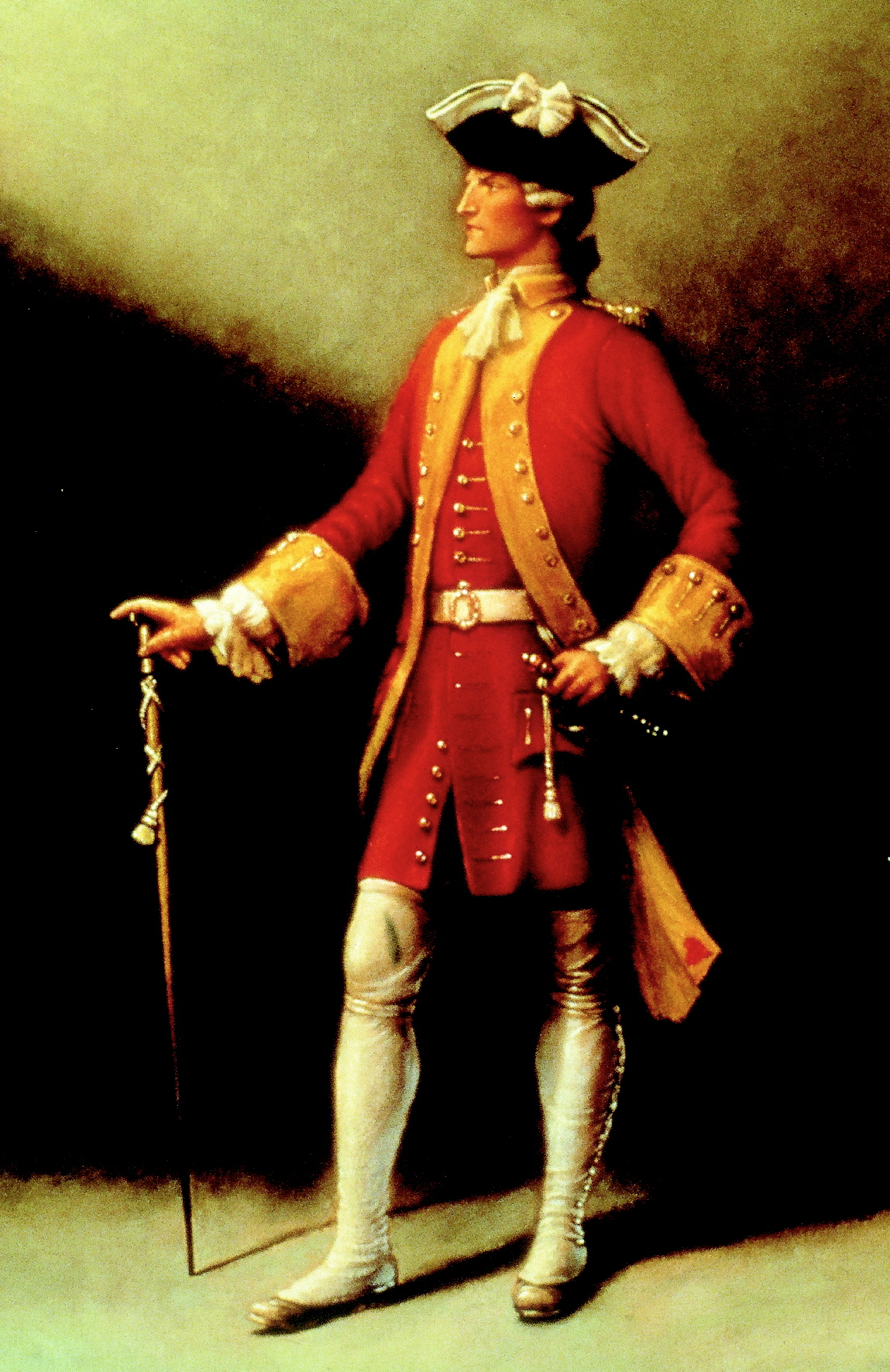
Richard Hennessy, founder of Jas Hennessy & Co., in the uniform of the Clare's Regiment

.

- War of the Austrian Succession
  - 1745 : Battle of Fontenoy

There were two Irish regiments in French service that bore at some time the name of Clare and of O'Brien. The original O'Brien's Regiment was placed on the French establishment in 1689, and after being renamed as Clare's Regiment in 1691 it was renamed again in 1694 as Lee's Regiment.

The second Clare's Regiment which was raised in 1696. This second regiment is the one referred to in the Clare's Dragoons song. This regiment too was briefly named O'Brien's Regiment. In 1775 this second Clare's Regiment was disbanded and its troops incorporated into Berwick's Regiment.

== Clare's Dragoons (song) ==
Clare’s Dragoons survives today as the regimental march of the 27th Infantry Battalion of the Irish Defence Forces.

"Clare's Dragoons"

Song
- Songwriter: Thomas Davis

Clare's Dragoons
Radio Éireann Symphony Orchestra and conductor Aloys Fleischmann.

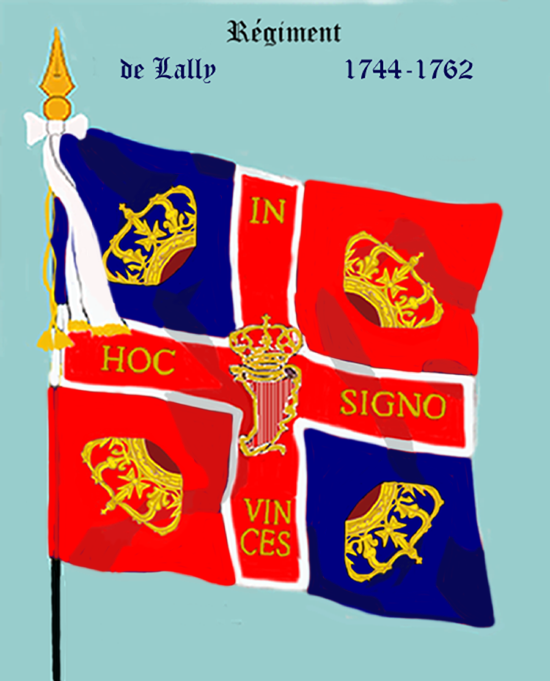
The flag of Lally's Regiment, Irish Brigade of France

When on Ramillies' bloody field,
The baffled French were forced to yield,
The victor Saxon backward reeled
Before the charge of Clare's Dragoons.
The Flags we conquered in that fray,
Look lone in Ypres' choir, they say,
We'll win them company to-day,
Or bravely die like Clares Dragoons.

Chorus:
Viva la for Ireland's wrong!
Viva la, for Ireland's right!
Viva la in battle throng,
For a Spanish steed, and sabre bright!

The brave old Lord died near the fight,
But, for each drop he lost that night,
A Saxon cavalier shall bite
The dust before Lord Clare's Dragoons,
For never when our spears were set
And never, when our sabres met,
Could we the Saxon soldiers get
To stand the shock of Clare's Dragoons.

Viva la, the New Brigade!
Viva la, the Old One too!
Viva la, the rose shall fade,
And the shamrock shine forever new!

Another Clare is here to lead,
The worthy son of such a breed;
The French expect some famous deed,
When Clare leads on his bold Dragoons.
Our Colonel comes from Brians race,
His wounds are in his breast and face,
The bearna baoghail is still his place,
The foremost of his bold Dragoons.

Viva la, the New Brigade!
Viva la, the Old One too!
Viva la, the rose shall fade,
And the shamrock shine forever new!

There's not a man in squadron here
Was ever known to flinch or fear;
Though first in charge and last in rere,
Have ever been Lord Clare's Dragoons;
But, see! We'll soon have work to do,
To shame our boasts, or prove them true,
For hither comes the English crew,
To sweep away Lord Clare's Dragoons.

Viva la for Ireland's wrong!
Viva la, for Ireland's right!
Viva la in battle throng,
For a Spanish steed, and sabre bright!

Oh! Comrades! Think how Ireland pines,
Her exiled Lords, her rifled shrines,
Her dearest hope, the ordered lines,
And bursting charge of Clare's Dragoons,
The fling your Green Flag to the sky,
Be "Limerick!" your battle cry,
And charge, till blood floats fetlock-high,
Around the track of Clare's Dragoons!

Viva la, the New Brigade!
Viva la, the Old One too!
Viva la, the rose shall fade,
And the shamrock shine forever new!

== Notable people ==
- Muircheartach Óg Ó Súilleabháin (c. 1710–1754), soldier and smuggler
