= Charles O'Brien, 9th Earl of Thomond =

Franco-Irish nobleman

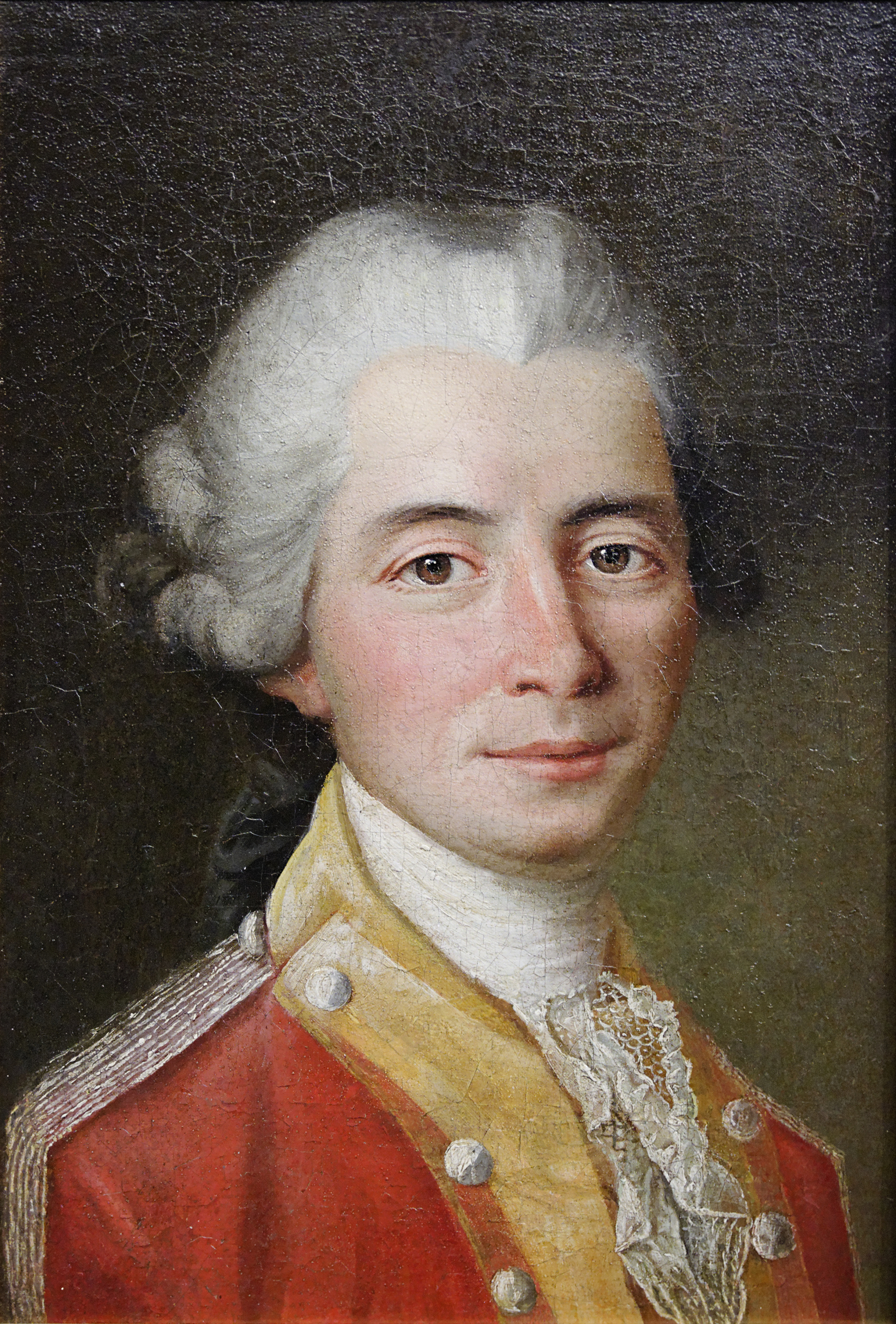
Officer of the Clare Regiment, after 1767, possibly Charles O'Brien, Paris, Musée de l'Armée

Charles O'Brien, titular 7th Viscount Clare and 9th Earl of Thomond (1757-1774) was a Franco-Irish nobleman.

== Biography ==
He was born on 18 October 1757 in Paris, France, the son of Charles O'Brien, 6th Viscount Clare, maréchal de Thomond and Marie Genevieve Louise Gauthier de Chifreville. He was Colonel-proprietor of the Clare Regiment after his father, but died before assuming effective command. O'Brien died unmarried at 17 of natural causes on 29 December 1774 in Paris.

Peerage of Ireland
Preceded by Charles O'Brien	— TITULAR — Earl of Thomond; 1761-1774	Extinct
Preceded by Charles O'Brien	— TITULAR — Viscount Clare; 1761-1774	Extinct
