= Charles O'Brien, 5th Viscount Clare =

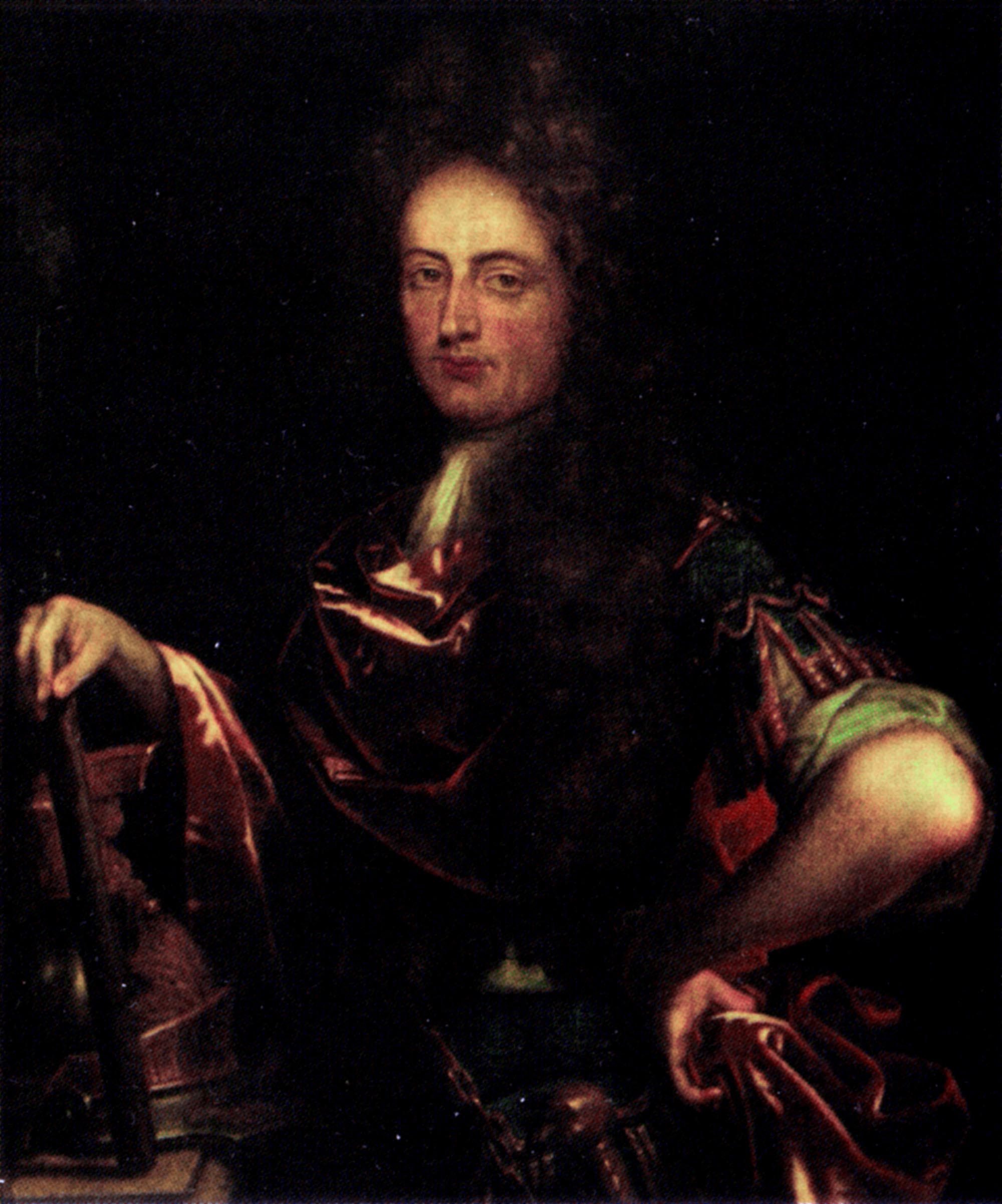
Charles O'Brien, 5th Viscount Clare

Charles O'Brien, 5th Viscount Clare (1673–1706) was the son of Daniel O'Brien, 3rd Viscount Clare and Philadelphia Lennard. He married Charlotte Bulkeley, daughter of Henry Bulkeley and Sophia Stuart, on 9 January 1696, at Saint-Germain-en-Laye, France. Henry Bulkeley was the "Master of the Household" for Kings Charles II and James II.

The family fought as part of the Jacobite Irish Army during the War of the Two Kings, before going into exile in the Flight of the Wild Geese. Charles succeeded his brother Daniel O'Brien, 4th Viscount Clare, to the title as 5th Viscount Clare in the Jacobite Peerage on his brother's death from a mortal wound received in the Battle of Marsaglia, Italy 4 October 1693. Charles was transferred from the Queen's Dismounted Dragoons where he was colonel, to the command of O'Brien's Regiment on 6 April 1696. Later in the year he led the regiment in the siege of Valenza in Lombardy, and the next year they were stationed with the army at Meuse.

By 1698 over one-third of King James’ army was either dead or crippled, and when the treaty of Ryswick ended the war between Louis and William, James’ soldiers were disbanded, unemployed, and homeless. Many became beggars but others joined the Irish Brigade in the Spanish army, while others went to Austria and entered the Catholic Corps.

Hostilities were renewed and Clare’s Regiment was assigned to the Army of Germany for two years in 1701-02. At the Battle of Cremona, in 1702, the Irishmen defended the town against Prince Eugene and the imperial army. The attack was to be a surprise but the Wild Geese foiled the attempt. The following year Lord Clare was promoted to brevet Brigadier of Infantry on 2 April 1703. A few months later on 20 September 1703, the unit took part in the successful Battle of Hochstedt, better known as the Battle of Blenheim and a year later was involved in the unsuccessful battle on 13 August 1704, at the second Battle of Blenheim. Although Clare’s Regiment experienced ups and downs, they were always admired. Two months after Blenheim, Charles rose to the brevet rank of Marshal-de-Camp on 26 October 1704, and a year later Lord Clare was assigned to the Army of the Moselle under the Marshel de Villars. Clare’s Regiment fought in the disastrous Battle of Ramillies on 23 May 1706, where they distinguished themselves with great glory, but Lord Clare was mortally wounded and died at Brussels, Belgium.

Due to the great service the O'Brien family had given to France, and having risked all, King Louis XIV made sure that the regiment was kept in the family, and appointed Lt. Col. Murrough O'Brien (of the Carrigonnell O'Brien's) as its commander until the minor Charles came of age.

Charles O'Brien and Charlotte Bulkeley had two children, Charles O'Brien, 6th Viscount Clare (27 Mar 1699 – 9 Sep 1761) and Henry O'Brien (b. 12 Feb 1701).

Peerage of Ireland
Preceded by Daniel O'Brien	Viscount Clare; 1693–1706	Succeeded by Charles O'Brien
