= Daniel O'Brien, 4th Viscount Clare =

Daniel O'Brien, 4th Viscount Clare (died 1693) was the son of Daniel O'Brien, 3rd Viscount Clare and Philadelphia Lennard. A Jacobite supporter of James II, he served with the Irish Army during the War of the Two Kings. He was commander of a regiment which he conveyed to France where he fought in the Battle of Marsaglia on 4 October 1693 and was mortally wounded. Daniel O'Brien never married and was therefore succeeded by his brother Charles O'Brien, 5th Viscount Clare.

Peerage of Ireland
Preceded by Daniel O'Brien	Viscount Clare ?-1693	Succeeded by Charles O'Brien
