= Earl of Thomond =

Title in the Peerage of Ireland

- Arms of Murrough O'Brien, 1st Earl of Thomond: Quarterly of 4: 1&4: Gules, three lions passant guardant in pale per pale or and argent (O'Brien); 2nd: Argent, three piles conjoined in point gules; 3rd: Or, a pheon azure
- Creation date: 1543 (first creation); 11 December 1756 (second creation)
- Created by: Henry VIII
- Peerage: Peerage of Ireland
- First holder: Murrough O'Brien, King of Thomond
- Last holder: Henry O'Brien, 8th Earl (first creation); Percy Wyndham-O'Brien (second creation)
- Remainder to: The 1st Earl's heirs male of the body lawfully begotten
- Subsidiary titles: Baron Ibrickane
- Status: Extinct
- Extinction date: 20 April 1741 (first creation); 1774 (second creation)
- Former seats: Bunratty Castle; Dromoland Castle; Leamaneh Castle
- Motto: Lámh Láidir in Uachtar (Irish: '[the] stronger hand uppermost')

Earl of Thomond (Irish: Iarla Thuamhumhan) was an hereditary title in the Peerage of Ireland. It was created twice for the O'Brien dynasty which is an ancient Irish sept native to north Munster.

== History and background ==
=== First creation ===
Under the Crown of Ireland Act 1542, King Henry VIII of England was created King of Ireland by the Parliament of Ireland. In consequence, all reigning monarchs and clan chiefs in Ireland were ordered to surrender their native titles in return for peerages. This surrender and regrant offer was conditional upon the adoption of Tudor customs and laws, including pledging allegiance to the Irish Crown and apostatising from the Catholic faith by accepting the articles of the state established Church of Ireland.

Through surrender and regrant, the earldom of Thomond was created in 1543 for Murrough O'Brien. He had previously been styled King of Thomond and was descended from the Ard Rí or High King of Ireland, Brian Boru. O'Brien was also created Baron Inchiquin, on 1 July 1543. On the same day his nephew and heir, Donough O'Brien, was created Baron Ibrickane. The titles of Ibrickane and Thomond merged on the first Earl's death in 1551, and the barony of Inchiquin went to his eldest son.

=== Forfeit of title ===
The 8th Earl was created Viscount Tadcaster, in the Peerage of Great Britain, on 19 October 1714. However, when he died in 1741, the next heir would have been a descendant of Daniel O'Brien, 3rd Viscount Clare who was attainded in 1691, so the three titles became forfeit. However, Charles O'Brien, 6th Viscount Clare, a Jacobite exile used the title Earl of Thomond, as did his son, who died childless in 1774.

=== Second creation ===
The second creation was on 11 December 1756 when Percy Wyndham-O'Brien was created Earl of Thomond and Baron Ibracken. On his death in 1774, both titles became extinct.

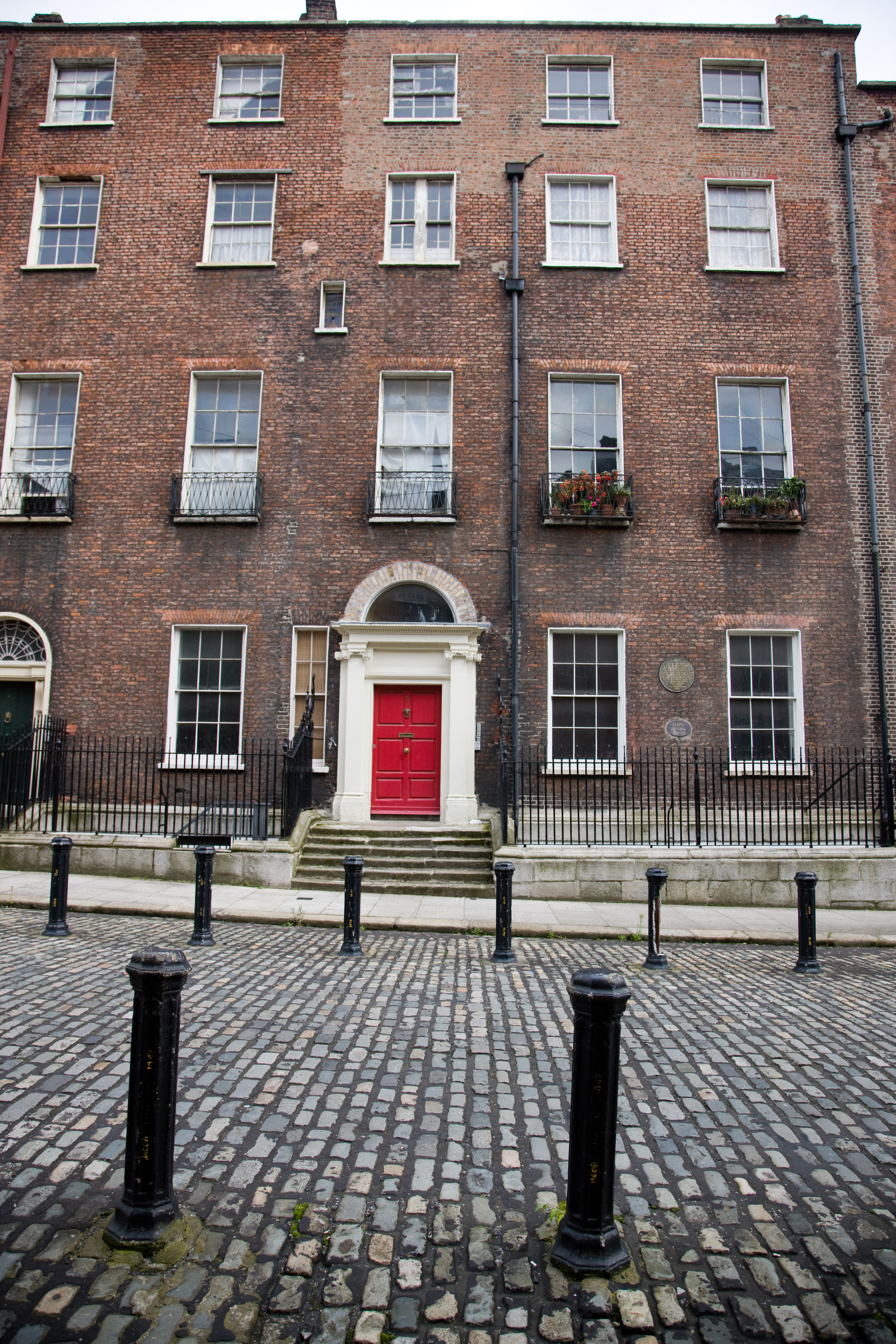
8th Earl's town house 5 Henrietta Street, Dublin

== Earls of Thomond (1543) ==
- Murrough O'Brien, 1st Earl of Thomond (died 1551)
- Donough O'Brien, 2nd Earl of Thomond (died 1553) – created Baron Ibrickane in 1543.
- Connor O'Brien, 3rd Earl of Thomond (c. 1535–1581)
- Donogh O'Brien, 4th Earl of Thomond (died 1624)
- Henry O'Brien, 5th Earl of Thomond (c. 1588–1639)
- Barnabas O'Brien, 6th Earl of Thomond (c. 1590–1657)
- Henry O'Brien, 7th Earl of Thomond (c. 1620–1691)
  - Henry O'Brien, Lord Ibrackan (c. 1642–1678)
  - Henry Horatio O'Brien, Lord Ibrackan (died 1690)
- Henry O'Brien, 8th Earl of Thomond (1688–1741), grandson of the 7th Earl. All titles forfeit on his death.
- Charles O'Brien, 6th Viscount Clare, titular 9th Earl of Thomond (1699–1761)
- Charles O'Brien, 7th Viscount Clare, titular 10th Earl of Thomond (died 1774)

== Earls of Thomond (1756) ==
- Percy Wyndham-O'Brien, 1st Earl of Thomond (c. 1723–1774)

== See also ==
- List of monarchs of Thomond
- Marquess of Thomond
- Viscount Clare
