= Henry O'Brien, 5th Earl of Thomond =

Irish earl (died 1639)

Henry O'Brien
- Earl of Thomond
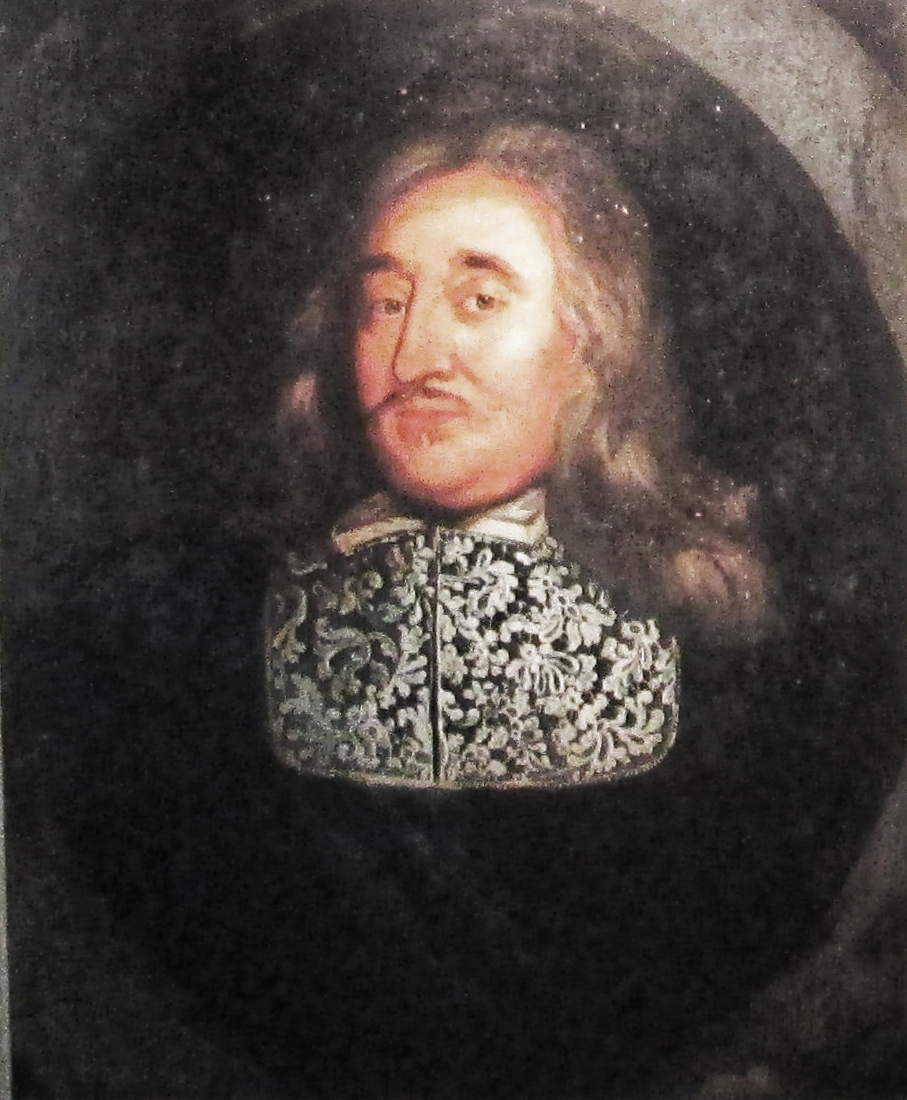
- Tenure: 1624–1639
- Predecessor: Donogh, 4th Earl
- Successor: Barnabas, 6th Earl
- Died: 26 July 1639
- Buried: St Mary's Cathedral, Limerick
- Spouse: Mary Brereton
- Issue Detail: Margaret, & others
- Father: Donogh, 4th Earl
- Mother: Elizabeth FitzGerald

Henry O'Brien, 5th Earl of Thomond PC (Ire) (1588–1639), styled Lord Ibrickane until 1624, was summoned to the House of Lords of the Irish Parliament of 1613–1615.

== Birth and origins ==
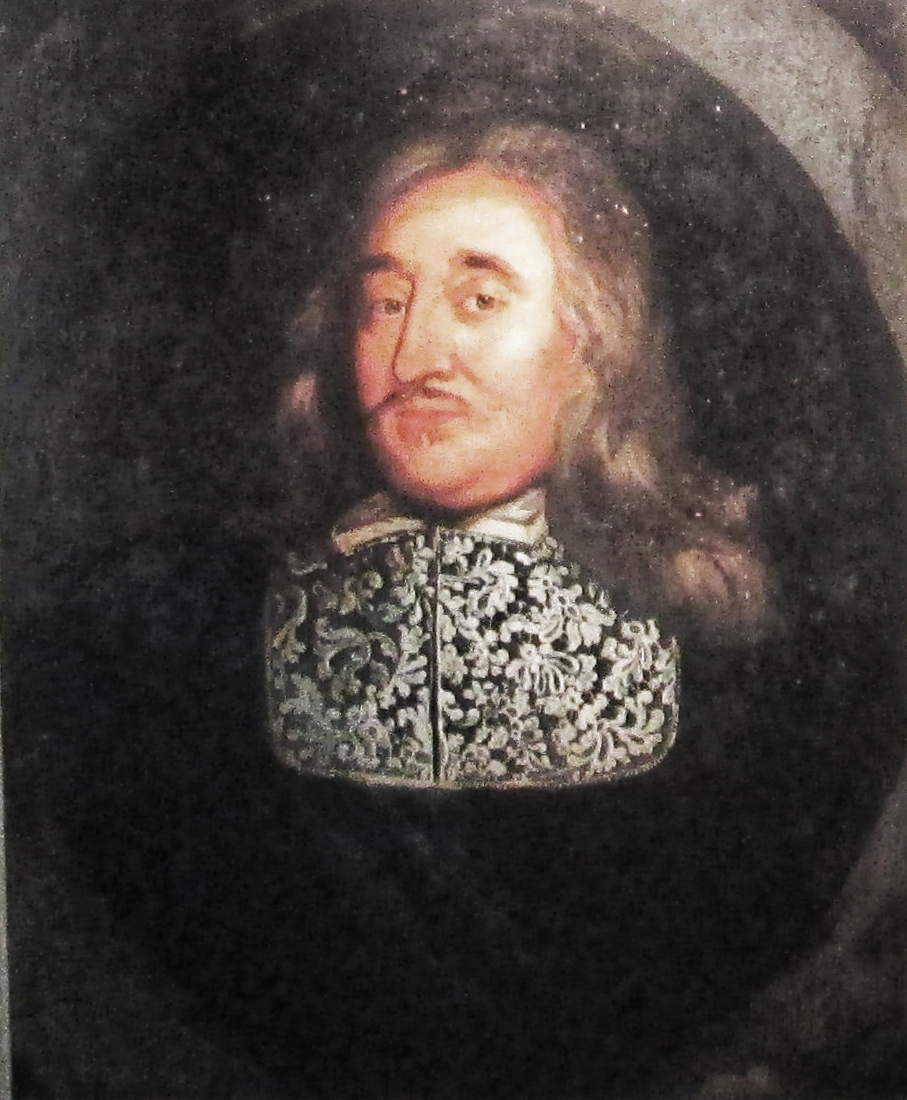
Henry O'Brien, 5th Earl of Thomond

Henry was born the eldest son of Donogh O'Brien and Elizabeth FitzGerald. His father was the 4th Earl of Thomond. His father's family were the O'Briens, an important Gaelic Irish dynasty, that descended from Brian Boru, medieval high king of Ireland.

Henry's mother was the fourth daughter of Gerald FitzGerald, 11th Earl of Kildare and his wife Mabel Brown.

Family tree

Henry O'Brien with wife, parents, and other selected relatives. (Note: This family tree is based on genealogies of the earls of Thomond.)

Conor; 3rd Earl c. 1535 – 1581	Una; O'Brien d. 1589	Gerald; FitzGerald; 11th Earl; Kildare; 1525–1585
Helen; Roche d. 1583	Donogh; 4th Earl d. 1624	Elizabeth; FitzGerald d. 1617
Margaret; O'Brien	Henry; 5th Earl c. 1588 – 1639	Mary; Brereton d. 1640	Barnabas; 6th Earl c. 1590 – 1657
Edward; 2nd Marquess; Worcester; 1602–1667	Margaret; O'Brien d. 1681	Henry; 7th Earl; 1620–1691
Henry; Horatio d. 1690 d.v.p.*
Henry; 8th Earl; 1688–1741

Legend

XXX	Subject of the article	XXX	Earls of Thomond	XXX	Marquess of Worcester

*d.v.p. = predeceased his father (decessit vita patris)

== Marriage and children ==
On 13 July 1608 O'Brien married Mary Brereton, a rich heiress, the only daughter of William Brereton, 1st Baron Brereton and Margaret Savage.

Henry and Mary had five daughters:

1. Lady Mary (died 1686) married, on 24 June 1627, Charles Cokayne, 1st Viscount Cullen
2. Lady Margaret, who married first Edward Somerset, 2nd Marquess of Worcester and secondly Donough Kearney
3. Lady Elisabeth (1616–1659) married, on 21 August 1636, Dutton Gerard, 3rd Baron Gerard (1613–1640), grandson of Thomas Gerard, 1st Baron Gerard
4. Lady Anne (died 1645) married, in 1641, Henry O'Brien, 7th Earl of Thomond
5. Lady Honora married first Sir Francis Inglefield, knight of Wotton-Bassett, and secondly Sir Robert Howard, son of the Earl of Berkshire

== House of Lords ==
O'Brien was summoned on 3 March 1613 as Lord Ibrickane to the Irish House of Lords of the Irish Parliament of 1613–1615, the only parliament of King James I in Ireland.

== 5th Earl ==
Ibrickane succeeded his father on 5 September 1624 as the 5th Earl of Thomond.

== Death ==
Thomond died in 1639 and was buried in St Mary's Cathedral, Limerick. He had no son and was succeeded in his titles by his brother Barnabas O'Brien, 6th Earl of Thomond.

== Notes and references ==
=== Sources ===
- Burke, Bernard (1866). A Genealogical History of the Dormant, Abeyant, Forfeited and Extinct Peerages of the British Empire (New ed.). London: Harrison. OCLC 11501348.
- Cokayne, George Edward (1896). Complete Peerage of England, Scotland, Ireland, Great Britain and the United Kingdom, Extant, Extinct, or Dormant. Vol. VII (1st ed.). London: George Bell and Sons. OCLC 1180891114. – S to T (for Thomond)
- McGurk, J. J. N. (2004). "O'Brien, Donough, fourth earl of Thomond (d. 1624)". In Matthew, Colin; Harrison, Brian (eds.). Oxford Dictionary of National Biography. Vol. 41. New York: Oxford University Press. pp. 360–362. ISBN 0-19-861391-1.

Peerage of Ireland
Preceded by Donogh O'Brien	Earl of Thomond; 1624–1639	Succeeded by Barnabas O'Brien
Preceded by Donogh O'Brien	Baron Ibrickane (writ in acceleration); 1613–1639	Succeeded by Barnabas O'Brien
