= Donogh O'Brien, 4th Earl of Thomond =

Protestant Irish Gaelic lord (died 1624)

Donogh O'Brien
- Earl of Thomond
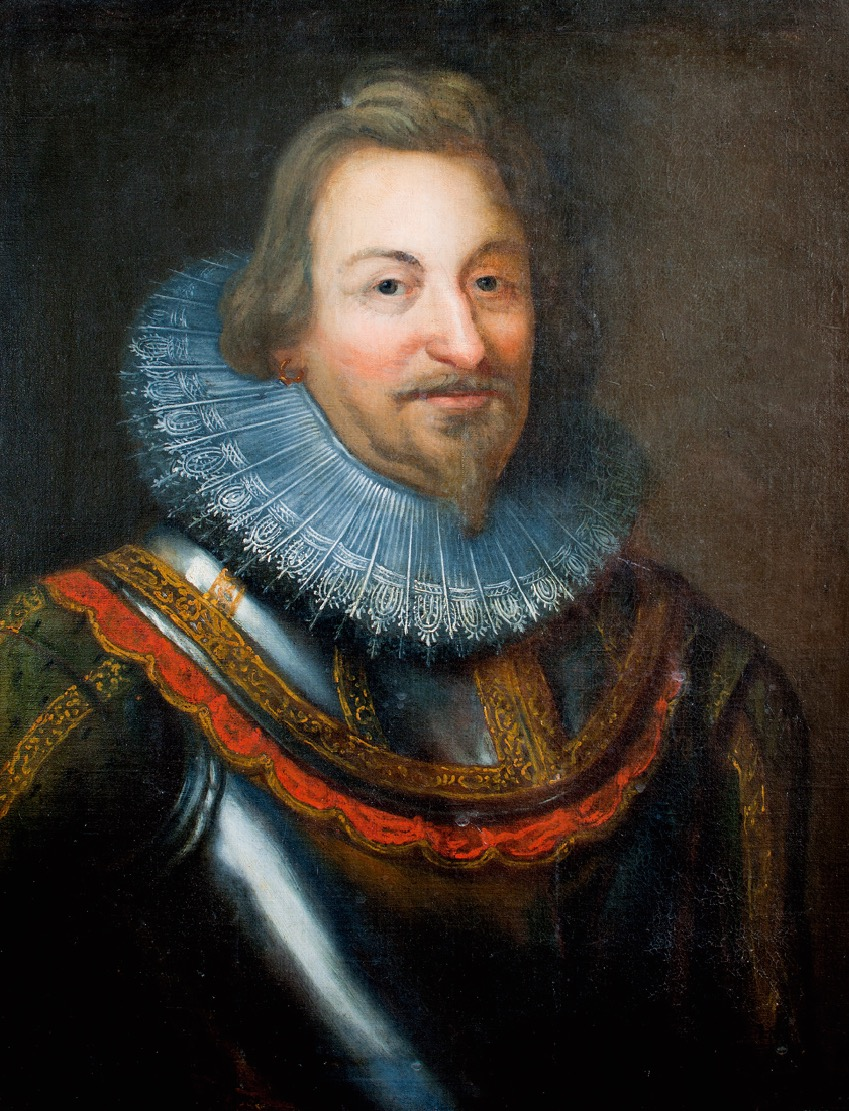
- Anonymous portrait at Bunratty Castle
- Tenure: 1581–1624
- Predecessor: Conor, 3rd Earl
- Successor: Henry, 5th Earl
- Died: 5 September 1624; Clonmel
- Spouses: 1. Helen Roche; 2. Elizabeth FitzGerald
- Issue Detail: Henry, Barnabas, & others
- Father: Conor, 3rd Earl of Thomond
- Mother: Una O'Brien-Arra

Donogh O'Brien, (Note: His first name is also spelt "Donough".) 4th Earl of Thomond and Baron Ibrickan, PC (Ire) (died 1624), was a Protestant Irish nobleman and soldier, and Chief of Clan O'Brien. He fought for Queen Elizabeth during Tyrone's Rebellion and participated in the Siege of Kinsale. He obtained the transfer of County Clare, where most of his lands lay, from the Province of Connacht to that of Munster. He was made president of Munster in 1605.

== Birth and origins ==
Donogh was born in the 1560s. (Note: Donogh's birth date is bracketed by the death of his father's first wife in 1560 and his first mention in 1577. His birth should be in or shortly after 1560 as his daughter Margaret married about 1590.) He was the eldest son of Conor O'Brien, and his second wife, Una O'Brien-Arra. His father was the 3rd Earl of Thomond. His father's first wife had died in 1560. His father's family, the O'Briens, were a Gaelic Irish dynasty that descended from Brian Boru, medieval high king of Ireland.

Donogh's mother was a daughter of Turlough O'Brien of Arra, County Tipperary. This Arra is in the north of the Owney and Arra barony around the Arra Hills. His mother's family was a cadet branch of his father's family. His parents married in or after 1560 as his father's first wife died in that year.

Donogh had two brothers and three sisters, who are listed in his father's article.

Family tree

Donogh O'Brien with his two wives, his parents, and other selected relatives. (Note: This family tree is based on genealogies of the earls of Thomond. and the earls of Clancarty.)

Donogh; 2nd Earl d. 1553	Helen; Butler d. 1597
Maurice; Roche; 6th Viscount; Fermoy d. 1600	Conor; 3rd Earl c. 1535 – 1581	Una; O'Brien- Arra d. 1589	Gerald; FitzGerald; 11th Earl; Kildare; 1525–1585
Helen; Roche d. 1583	Donogh; 4th Earl d. 1624	Elizabeth; FitzGerald d. 1617
Charles; 1st Viscount; Muskerry d. 1641	Margaret; O'Brien m. 1590	Henry; 5th Earl c. 1588 – 1639	Barnabas; 6th Earl c. 1590 – 1657
Donough; 1st Earl; Clancarty; 1594–1665	Eleanor; Butler; 1612–1682	Henry; 7th Earl; 1620–1691

Legend

XXX	Subject of the article	XXX	Earls of Thomond	XXX	Viscounts Muskerry & Earls of Clancarty

== Early life ==
O'Brien was brought up at Elizabeth's court and therefore became a Protestant. He was already living there when he was mentioned as Baron Ibrickan in the patent granted to his father on 7 October 1577.

== First marriage and daughter ==
O'Brien married, first, Ellen, or Any, or Eveleen, daughter of Maurice Roche, 6th Viscount Fermoy. Her family was Old English and Catholic.

Donogh and Ellen had one daughter:

- Margaret, married Charles MacCarthy, 1st Viscount Muskerry and was mother of Donough MacCarty, 1st Earl of Clancarty

His first wife died in 1583.

== Thomond ==
On his father's death in 1581 he succeeded as 4th Earl of Thomond. By 1582 Thomond, as he now was, had returned to Ireland.

Thomond was assiduous in his attendance upon the lord-deputy in 1583 and 1584. In 1584 he was one of the commissioners who established the agreement that tanistry and the law of partible succession should be abolished in Connaught, and a tax of ten shillings a quarter be paid on land.

He attended the Irish parliament 1585–1586 where he quarrelled with Ulick Burke, 3rd Earl of Clanricarde over precedence.

== Second marriage and children ==
In or before 1588 Thomond married secondly Elizabeth, fourth daughter of Gerald FitzGerald, 11th Earl of Kildare and his wife Mabel Brown.

Donogh and Elizabeth had two sons:

1. Henry (1588–1639), succeeded his father as the 5th Earl of Thomond
2. Barnabas (died 1657), succeeded his brother as the 6th Earl of Thomond

His second wife died on 12 January 1617.

== Tyrone's Rebellion ==
In 1595 Tyrone's rebellion, also called the Nine Years' War, broke out. Thomond played a major part in its suppression. In command of a large force, he passed the River Erne in July and invaded Hugh Roe O'Donnell's country, but retreated in August when a truce was signed. In September he was detached by Sir William Russell, Lord Deputy of Ireland since 16 May 1594, with five companies of foot and 145 horse, for the defence of Newry. Russel was succeeded in March 1597 as lord deputy by Thomas Burgh, 5th Baron Borough and Thomond served in 1597 in his campaign, but early next year went to England, arriving in London on 19 January 1598; where he stayed most of the year at Queen Elizabeth's court.

He therefore was absent at the Battle of Yellow Ford in August 1598, where Hugh O'Neill, Earl of Tyrone defeated and mortally wounded Sir Henry Bagenal, marshal of the Royal Irish Army. The defeat was followed by the spread of disaffection into Thomond's country. Teige O'Brien, Thomond's next brother, entered into communication with Tyrone's son, and joined the rebels. This left the defence of the land in the hands of the youngest brother Daniel. In 1599 O'Donnell invaded Clare, ravaging the country, capturing most of the castles, and taking Daniel prisoner. Thomond's second brother, Teige, was long imprisoned in Limerick on account of his rebellion, but was released on protesting his loyalty; after another imprisonment he joined in Hugh Roe O'Donnell's second invasion of Clare in 1599, and was killed during Thomond's pursuit of the rebels.

Thomond returned from England, and after spending three months with his kinsman, the Thomas Butler, 10th Earl of Ormond, in collecting forces, he invaded Clare to revenge his brother's imprisonment and recover his possessions. He procured ordnance from Limerick, and laid siege to the castles that resisted, capturing them after a few days' fighting; at Dunbeg, which surrendered immediately, he hanged the garrison in couples on trees. The invaders were completely driven out of Clare and the neighbouring country, and the loyalists had their strongholds restored to them. During the rest of 1599 Thomond accompanied Robert Devereux, 2nd Earl of Essex on his progress through Munster, but left him at Dungarvan and returned to Limerick, being appointed governor of Clare on 15 August, and made a member of the privy council on 22 September.

During 1600 Thomond was constantly occupied in the war. In April he, Sir George Carew, and Ormond attended a parly with Owen McRory O'More, the son of Rory O'More. A quarrel broke out. He and Carew narrowly escaped capture while Ormond was taken captive. Thomond saved Carew's life and cut a way for both of them through their enemies, though he was wounded.

He was present at an encounter with Florence MacCarthy Reagh and assisted at his submission in May. In June he was commanding in Clare and opposing O'Donnell's raids. He entertained the lord-deputy at Bunratty and marched out to oppose Tyrone's progress southwards, but no battle was fought, and Tyrone returned without having even seen an enemy. Next year, after holding an assize at Limerick in February, at which sixteen men were hanged, Thomond again went to England, probably with the object of obtaining the governorship of Connaught and of securing the union of Clare with Munster. He delayed there, then set out by Bristol, and, landing at Castlehaven on 11 November 1601, proceeded to Kinsale, where he took a prominent part in the siege. After the surrender of Kinsale he proceeded through Munster, and established himself in Bere Island. He was in command at the siege of Dunboy and hanged fifty-eight of the survivors.

Until June 1602 Thomond was constantly with the army. He then again visited England, and, as a recompense for his services, his request for the transfer of Clare was granted, though the lord-deputy and privy council of Ireland were opposed to the measure. He returned in October. In 1603 he became a member of the Irish Privy Council. On 30 July 1604 he was appointed constable of Carlow, and on 6 May 1605 he became President of Munster.

== Late life, death, and timeline ==
In 1613 Thomond attended the House of Lords of the Irish Parliament of 1613–1615. He strongly upheld the Protestant party in its opposition to the recusants in the disputes about the election of the speaker of the House of Commons.

On 17 May 1619 he was reappointed governor of Clare. He became one of the sureties for Florence MacCarthy Reagh, who had been imprisoned since his surrender in 1600, and who dedicated to Thomond his work on the antiquity and history of Ireland.

He died on 5 September 1624, at Clonmel, and was buried in Limerick Cathedral, where a monument with an inscription was erected to his memory.

Pollard (1895b) concludes that he was one of the most influential and vigorous of the Irish loyalists; and, though his devotion and motives were sometimes suspected, Carew wrote that "his services hath proceeded out of a true nobleness of mind and from no great encouragement received" from the court.

Timeline
As his birth date is uncertain, so are all his ages.
Age	Date	Event
0	1560, estimate	Born
12–13	1573, 23 Feb	Fitz Maurice submitted to John Perrot, Lord President of Munster, at Kilmallock
16–17	1577	Mentioned as baron Ibrickan (courtesy title) in his father's new patent
20–21	1581	Succeeded as 4th Earl of Thomond
27–28	1588	Son Henry born
29–30	1590, about	Daughter Margaret married Charles MacCarthy, 1st Viscount Muskerry
33–34	1594, 16 May	William Russell, appointed Lord Deputy of Ireland
36–37	1597, 5 Mar	Thomas, Lord Burgh, appointed Lord Deputy of Ireland
37–38	1598, 14 Aug	The Irish defeated Henry Bagenal at the Battle of the Yellow Ford
38–39	1599, 12 Mar	Robert, Earl of Essex, appointed Lord Lieutenant of Ireland
40–41	1601, 23 Sep	The Spanish landed at Kinsale
42–43	1603, 30 Mar	The Treaty of Mellifont ended Tyrone's Rebellion.
42–43	1603, 24 Mar	Accession of King James I, succeeding Queen Elizabeth I
43–44	1604, 15 Oct	Sir Arthur Chichester, appointed Lord Deputy of Ireland
44–45	1605, 6 May	Appointed President of Munster
63–64	1624, 5 Sep	Died in Clonmel

== Notes ==
Peerage of Ireland
Preceded by Connor O'Brien	Earl of Thomond; 1581–1624	Succeeded by Henry O'Brien
Preceded by Connor O'Brien	Baron Ibrickane (descended by acceleration); 1581–1613	Succeeded by Henry O'Brien
