= Viscount Clare =

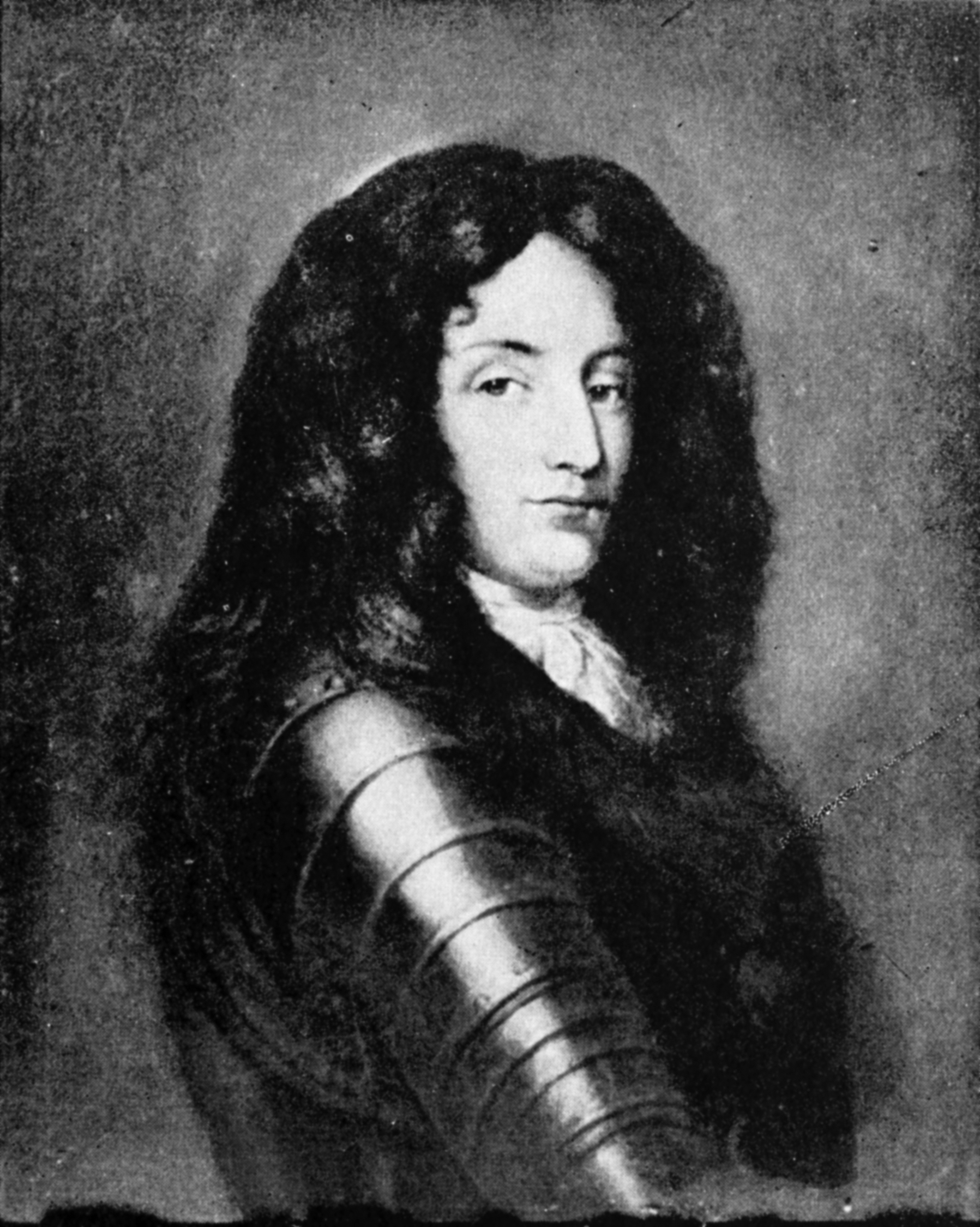
Daniel O'Brien, 1st Viscount Clare

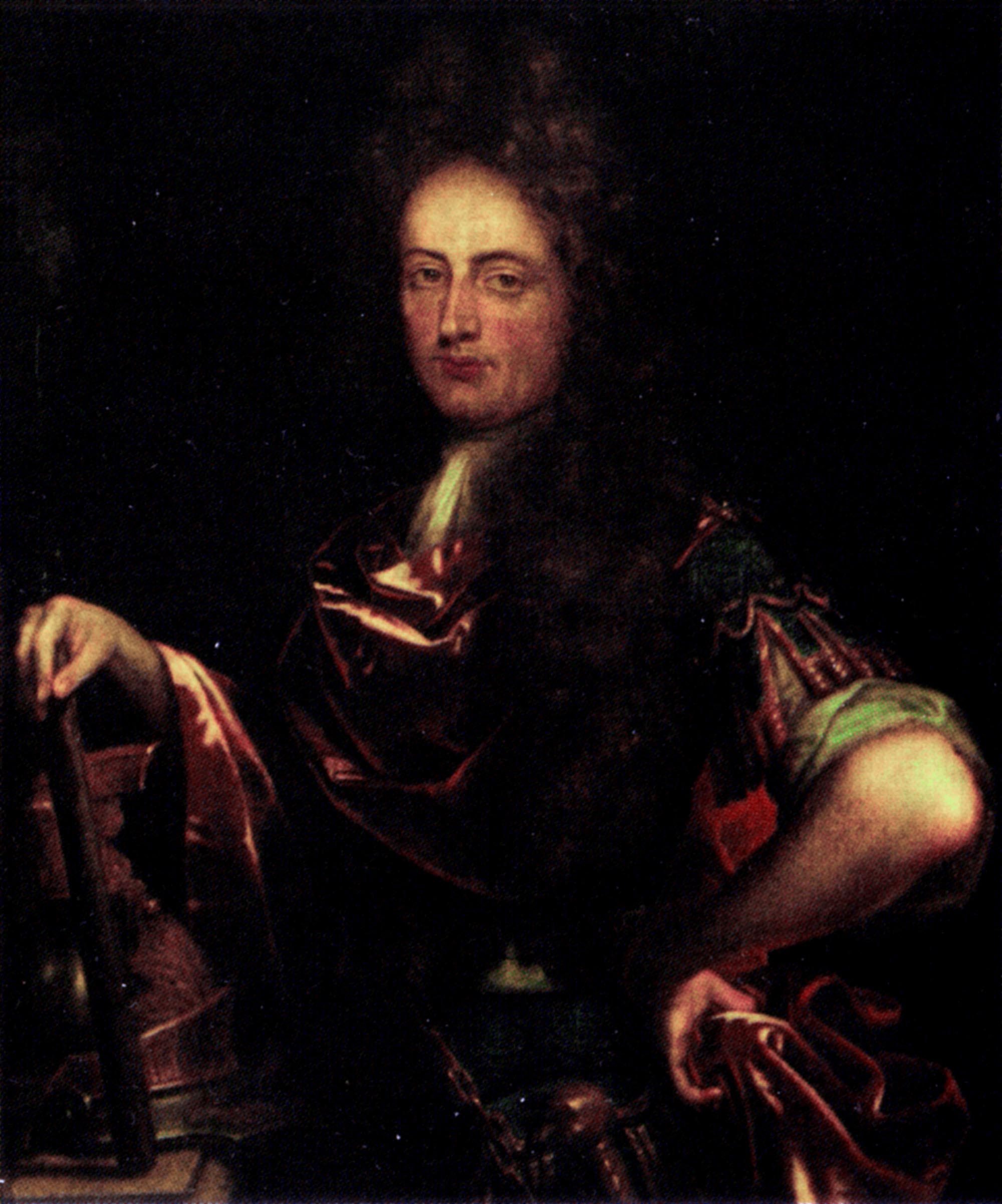
Charles O'Brien, 5th Viscount Clare

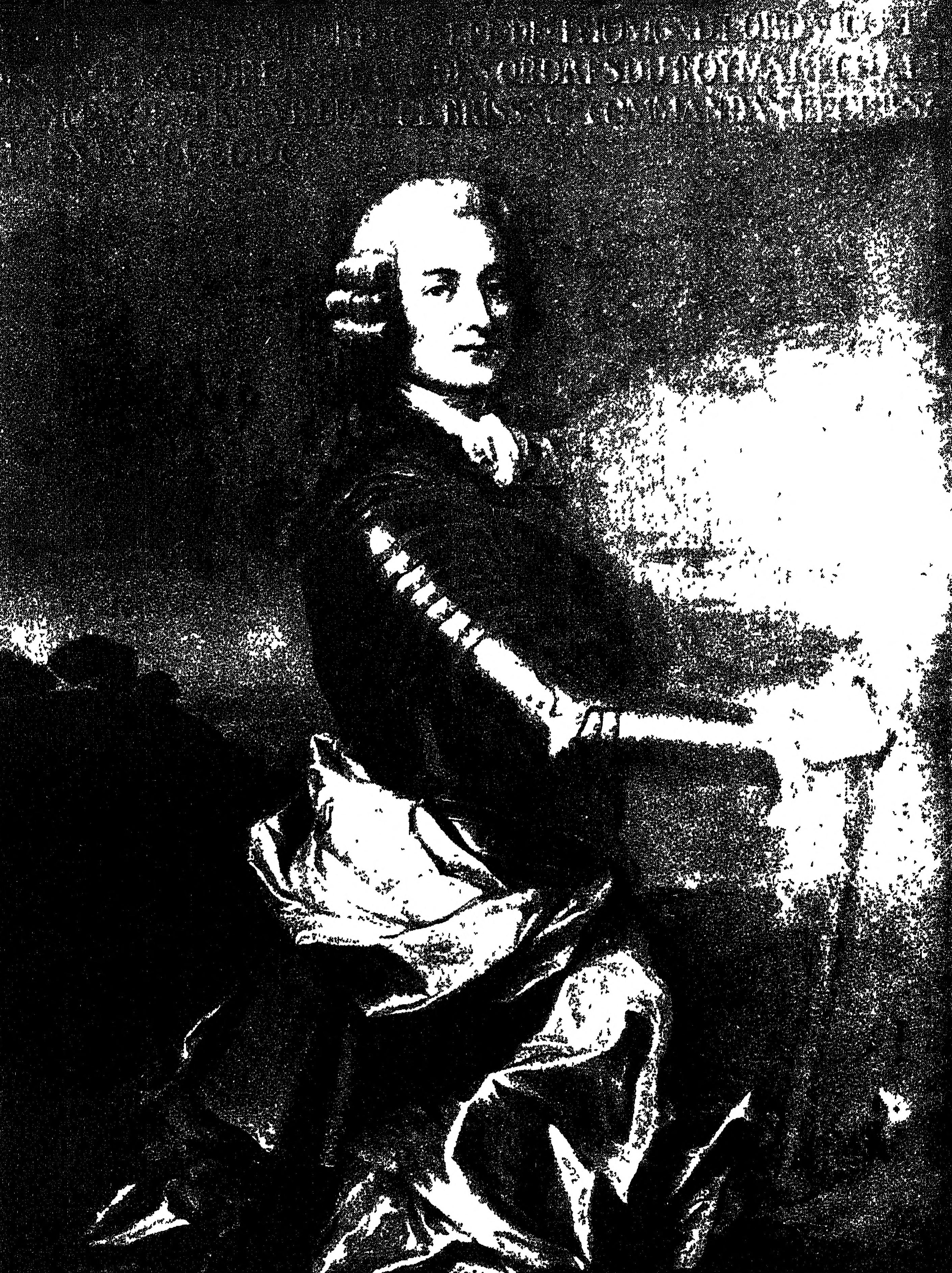
Charles O'Brien, 6th Viscount Clare, 9th Earl of Thomond, Marshal of France

Viscount Clare was a title in the Peerage of Ireland, created twice.

== First creation ==
The titles of Viscount Clare and Baron Moyarta were conferred on Daniel O'Brien, a younger son of Connor O'Brien, 3rd Earl of Thomond, on 11 July 1662. These titles were forfeit by the attainder of the third Viscount in 1691. However, the title continued to be used by his descendants in France. In 1741 the titular sixth Viscount Clare also succeeded as heir-male to the Earls of Thomond, and assumed that title as well, though because of his grandfather's attainder the succession was not recognised in Ireland. The claim to the viscounty and the earldom became dormant on the death of the titular seventh Viscount in 1774, and the headship of the O'Brien dynasty passed to the Earls of Inchiquin.

== Second creation ==
The titles of Viscount Clare and Baron Nugent were conferred on the politician Robert Craggs-Nugent on 19 January 1767. He was later created Earl Nugent. The viscounty became extinct on the death of the grantee in 1788.

== Viscounts Clare (1662) ==
- Daniel O'Brien, 1st Viscount Clare (died c. 1666)
- Connor O'Brien, 2nd Viscount Clare (c. 1605 – c. 1670)
- Daniel O'Brien, 3rd Viscount Clare (died c. 1691; attainted in 1691 but the title used by his descendants)
- Daniel O'Brien, 4th Viscount Clare (died c. 1693)
- Charles O'Brien, 5th Viscount Clare (died 1706)
- Charles O'Brien, 6th Viscount Clare (1699–1761; titular 9th Earl of Thomond from 1741)
- Charles O'Brien, 7th Viscount Clare, 10th Earl of Thomond (1757–1774)

== Viscount Clare (1767) ==
- Robert Craggs-Nugent, 1st Viscount Clare (1702–1788; created Earl Nugent in 1776)

== See also ==
- Earl of Thomond
- Earl Nugent
- Earl of Clare
