= Henry O'Brien, 8th Earl of Thomond =

Irish peer and Member of Parliament

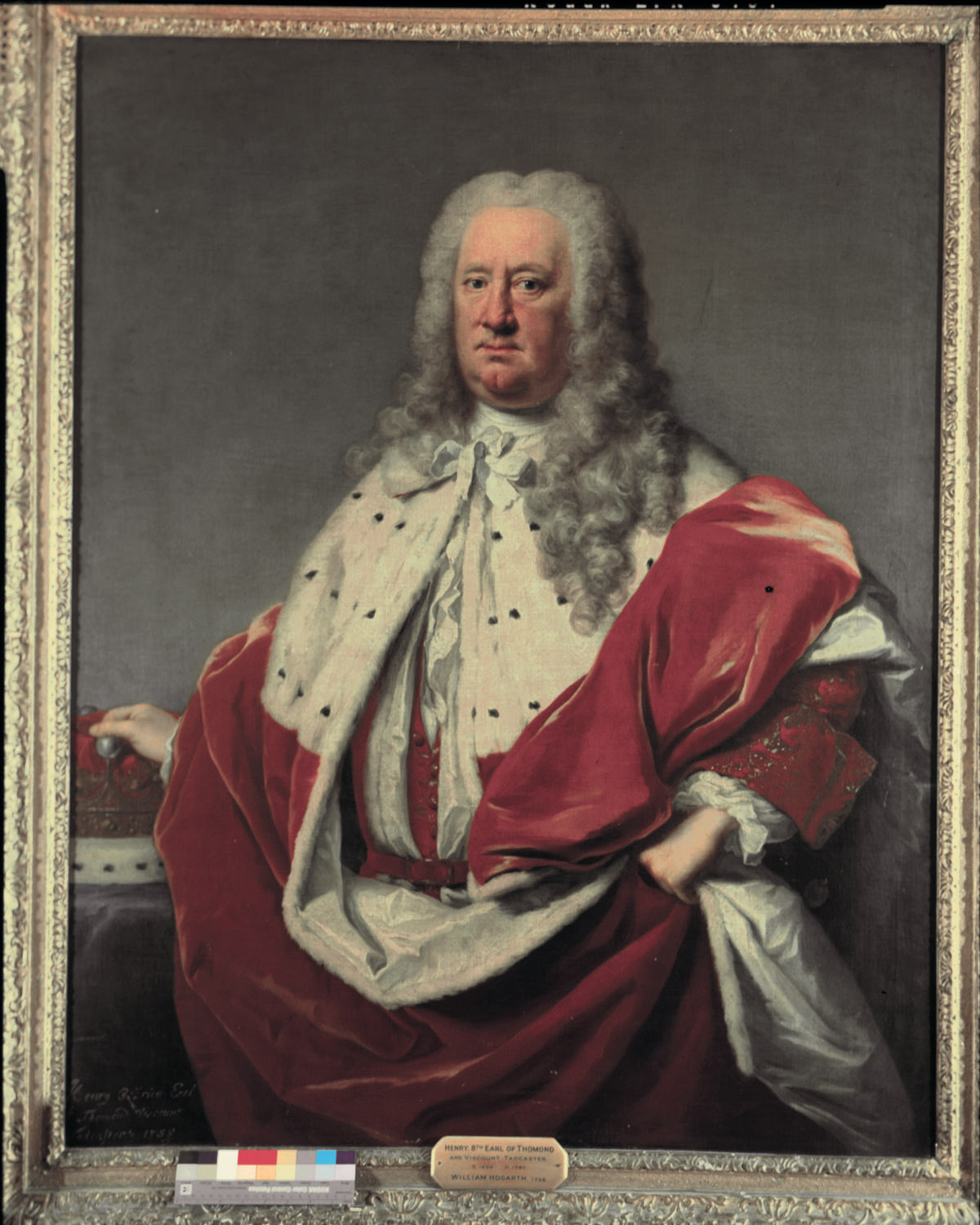
Henry O'Brien, 8th Earl of Thomond

Henry O'Brien, 8th Earl of Thomond (14 August 1688 – 20 April 1741) was an Irish peer, Member of Parliament and Chief of Clan O'Brien.

He was born the son of Henry Horatio O'Brien, Lord Ibrackan, who was to predecease his own father in 1690, allowing the title of Earl of Thomond to pass directly to Henry from his grandfather, Henry O'Brien, 7th Earl of Thomond one year later.

He was elected MP for Arundel, Sussex in the Parliament of the United Kingdom in 1710, sitting until 1714. He was then ennobled as Viscount Tadcaster. He served as Governor of County Clare and Governor of Carlow in 1714 and as Lord Lieutenant of Essex from 1721 to 1741.

The 1722 tragedy play Hibernia Freed, staged at the Lincoln's Inn Fields Theatre, was dedicated to him by the author William Philips.

He died in 1741 and was buried in Limerick Cathedral. He had married in 1707 Lady Elizabeth Seymour, daughter of Charles Seymour, 6th Duke of Somerset. They had no children and thus the viscountcy expired. His other titles were forfeited (because the presumptive heir was a descendant of Daniel O’Brien, 3rd Viscount Clare, subject to an attainder) and were eventually inherited by the earls of Inchiquin.

He left his substantial estates in County Clare to Murrough, Lord O'Brien, the young son of his cousin, William O'Brien, 4th Earl of Inchiquin. On Murrough's death in 1741, the estates passed instead to Percy Wyndham, a nephew of Henry's wife, who took the additional surname of O'Brien and in 1756 was created Earl of Thomond.

Parliament of Great Britain
Preceded by Viscount Lumley; The Viscount Shannon	Member of Parliament for Arundel; 1710–1714; With: Richard Lumley	Succeeded by Henry Lumley; Thomas Micklethwaite
Peerage of Ireland
Preceded by Henry O'Brien	Earl of Thomond; 1691–1741	Forfeit
