= Lord Lieutenant of Clare =

Ceremonial officer in Clare, Ireland

This is a list of people who served as Lord Lieutenant of County Clare.

There were lieutenants of counties in Ireland until the reign of James II, when they were renamed governors. The office of Lord Lieutenant was recreated on 23 August 1831.

== Governors ==
- Henry O'Brien, 8th Earl of Thomond 1714
- William O'Brien, 4th Earl of Inchiquin 1741–1777
- Murrough O'Brien, 1st Marquess of Thomond
- Sir Francis Nathaniel Burton 1805–1831
- William Vesey FitzGerald 1815–1831

== Lord Lieutenants ==
- William Vesey-FitzGerald, 2nd Baron FitzGerald and Vesey 7 October 1831 – 11 May 1843
- Lucius O'Brien, 13th Baron Inchiquin May 1843 – 22 March 1872
- Charles William White 28 May 1872 – January 1879
- Edward O'Brien, 14th Baron Inchiquin 13 January 1879 – 9 April 1900
- Hector Vandeleur 20 August 1900 – 3 October 1909
- Sir Michael O'Loghlen, 4th Baronet 7 October 1910 – 1922
