= Henry O'Brien, 7th Earl of Thomond =

Irish peer

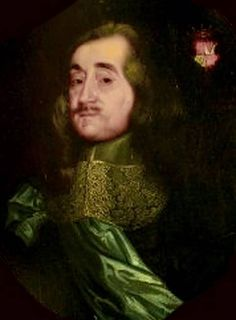
Henry O'Brien, 7th Earl of Thomond

Henry O'Brien, 7th Earl of Thomond PC (Ire) (c. 1620 – 2 May 1691) was an Irish peer and Chief of Clan O'Brien. He was styled Lord Ibrackan from 1639 to 1657.

O'Brien was the son of Barnabas O'Brien, 6th Earl of Thomond and Anne Fermor. In 1641, he married his first cousin Anne O'Brien (d. September 1645), daughter of Henry O'Brien, 5th Earl of Thomond, by whom he had one son:

- Henry, Lord Ibrackan (c. 1642 – 1678)

After Anne's death, he married Sarah Russell, daughter of Sir Francis Russell, and widow of Sir John Reynolds. This made O'Brian a brother-in-law of Henry Cromwell, who had married Sarah's sister Elizabeth. O'Brian and Sarah had five children:

- Henry, died in infancy
- Henry Horatio, Lord Ibrackan (d. 1690), who was father of Henry O'Brien, 8th Earl of Thomond (1688–1741)
- Elizabeth (d. 3 June 1688), without issue
- Auberie Anne Penelope, married Henry Howard, 6th Earl of Suffolk, and had issue
- Mary, married Sir Matthew Dudley, 2nd Baronet

Peerage of Ireland
Preceded by Barnabas O'Brien	Earl of Thomond; 1657–1691	Succeeded by Henry O'Brien
