= O'Loghlen =

O'Loghlen is an Irish surname. Notable people with the surname include:

- O'Loghlen baronets
  - Sir Michael O'Loghlen, 1st Baronet (1789–1842)
  - Sir Colman Michael O'Loghlen, 2nd Baronet (1819–1877)
  - Sir Bryan O'Loghlen, 3rd Baronet (1828–1905)
  - Sir Michael O'Loghlen, 4th Baronet (1866–1934)
- Peter O'Loghlen (1883–1971), Irish Fianna Fáil politician
- Peter O'Loghlen (1882–1923), Australian politician
