= High Sheriff of Clare =

The High Sheriff of Clare was a High Sheriff title. Records show that the title was in existence from at least the late 16th century, though it is not used today in the modern Republic of Ireland. The title existed within County Clare in the west of Ireland during the time of the Kingdom of Ireland and then as part of the United Kingdom of Great Britain and Ireland.

The office was a position with some significant power, the sheriffs were responsible for the maintenance of law and order and various other roles. Some of its powers were relinquished in 1831 as the Lord Lieutenant of Clare was instated to deal with military duties. It was only in 1908 under Edward VII of the United Kingdom that the Lord Lieutenant position became more senior than the High Sheriff. Its previous roles were later taken up also by the High Court judges, magistrates, coroners, local authorities and the police.

In Clare, the office of High Sheriff was established when Connacht was shired around 1569 and ceased to exist with the establishment of the Irish Free State in 1922.

== Part of the Kingdom of Ireland ==
=== House of Plantagenet ===
- 1375: Clement Laragh

=== House of Tudor ===
- 1570 Teige O'Brien
- 1576 Donnell Reagh McNamara
- 1577 Teige O'Brien
- 1578–1580 Turlough O'Brien
- 1582 Sir George Cusack
- 1584 Cruise (full name unknown)
- 1588 Boetius Clancy
- 1599 Richard Scurlock

=== House of Stuart ===
- 1605 Laurence Delahoyde
- 1607 Sir Nicholas Moid
- 1609 Turlough M‘Mahon
- 1610 John M‘Namara
- 1612 John Thornton
- 1613 Samuel Norton
- 1615 Boetius Clancy
- 1616 Donogh O’Brien
- 1622 Samuel Norton
- 1623 Sir John M‘Namara
- 1624 Capt. Daniel Norton
- 1628 Donogh O'Brien
- 1634 Donogh O'Brien
- 1635 Turlogh O'Brien
- 1641 William Brigdall
- 1643 Daniel O'Brien
- 1643 Boetius Clancy
- 1644 George Colpoys
- 1645 William Brigdall
- 1646 Robert Starkie of Dromoland

=== Commonwealth of England ===
- 1654 Sir Thomas Southwell, 1st Baronet
- 1656 William Pigott
- 1657 Sir William King, Kt

=== House of Stuart, restoration ===
- 1661 Thomas Cullen
- 1662–1663 George Purdon
- 1664 George Ross of Fortfergus
- 1665 Giles Vandeleur of Ralahine
- 1666–1667 Thomas Greene
- 1669 Samuel Burton
- 1670 Thomas Foote
- 1671 Thomas Hickman
- 1672 Benjamin Lucas
- 1673 Henry Ivers
- 1674 Mountfort Westropp of Bunratty
- 1675 Walter Hickman of Doonnagurroge
- 1676 John Colpoys
- 1677 Henry Lee of Clonderalaw
- 1678 Thomas Hickman of Barntick
- 1679 Sir Samuel Foxon
- 1681 George Stamer of Carnelly
- 1682 Donogh O'Brien of Newtown
- 1683 Giles Vandeleur of Ralahine
- 1684 Simon Purdon
- 1685 Edmond Pery, of Enagh
- 1686 Henry Cooper
- 1687 Redmond O'Hehir, Drumcaran
- 1688–1689 John M'Namara, Cratloe
- 1690 Sir Donogh O'Brien
- 1691–1692 Francis Burton
- 1693 Edmond Pery of Enagh
- 1694 David Bindon
- 1695 Thomas Hickman, Barntick
- 1696 Simon Purdon
- 1697 Thomas Spaight of Lodge
- 1698 Mountifort Westropp
- 1699 Henry Hickman
- 1700 John Cusack, Kilkishen
- 1701 William Smith
- 1702 Michael Cole
- 1703 Henry O'Brien of Stonehall
- 1704 William Butler
- 1705 Francis Gore of Clonroad
- 1706 Boyle Vandeleur of Kilrush
- 1707 Morgan Ryan
- 1708 George Hickman
- 1709 Robert Harrison of Fortfergus
- 1710 John Ivers of Mount Ivers
- 1711 George Colpoys of Ballycar
- 1712 William Butler of Roscroe

=== House of Hanover ===
- 1713 Robert Maghlin and Henry Bridgeman
- 1714 Thomas Hickman jnr
- 1715 Arthur Gore of Clonroad
- 1716 George Roche
- 1717 William Stamer of Carnelly
- 1718 Thomas Bellasyse
- 1719 Samuel Bindon of Rockmount
- 1720 Henry Ivers, Teige M'Namara
- 1721 Arthur Ward of Cappa Lodge
- 1722 John Ringrose of Moynoe
- 1723 William Fitzgerald
- 1724 John Ross-Lewin, Fortfergus
- 1725 Thomas Spaight of Bunratty
- 1726 Robert Hickman of Barntick
- 1727 Thomas Studdert of Bunratty
- 1728 Charles M'Donnell, Kilkee
- 1729 Poole Hickman, Kilmore
- 1730 James Fitzgerald, Stonehall
- 1731 Robert Maghlin of Feakle
- 1732 Thomas M'Mahon, Ballykilty
- 1733 Edmond Brown, Ballyslattery
- 1734 Luke Hickman, Fenloe
- 1735 Nicholas Bindon, Rockmount
- 1736 John Brady, Raheens
- 1737 St. John Bridgeman, Woodfield
- 1738 Richard Henn, Paradise Hill
- 1739 Augustus Fitzgerald, Silvergrove
- 1740 George Purdon, Tinneranna
- 1741 John Stacpoole, Cloghaunatinny
- 1742 Robert Harrison, Garrura
- 1743 James Butler, Newmarket
- 1744 John Westropp, Lismeehan
- 1745 Edmond Brown, Ballyslattery
- 1746 Robert Westropp, Fortanne
- 1747 Patrick Richard England, Lifford
- 1748 John Colpoys, Ballycar
- 1749 Henry Hickman, Kilmore
- 1750 William Blood, Bohersallagh
- 1751 Pierce Creagh, Dangan
- 1752 Joseph England, Cahercalla
- 1753 Andrew Morony, Dunnaha
- 1754 Francis Foster, Cloneen
- 1755 Harrison Ross-Lewin, Fortfergus
- 1756 Thomas Burton, Carrigaholt
- 1757 George Stamer, Carnelly
- 1758 Edward O'Brien, Ennistymon
- 1759 Edmond Hogan, Doonbeg
- 1760 Charles M'Donnell, Kilkee
- 1761 Edward FitzGerald, Stonehall
- 1762 John Scott, Cahircon
- 1763 George Stacpoole, Cragbrien
- 1764 Crofton Vandeleur, Kilrush
- 1765 James Burke, Loughburk
- 1766 William Henn, Paradise
- 1767 Anthony Casey, Seafield
- 1768 Thomas Arthur, Glenomera
- 1769 Sir Hugh Dillon Massey, 1st Baronet of Doonass
- 1770 George Quin, Quinsborough
- 1771 George Colpoys, Ballycar
- 1772 Ralph Westropp, Attyflynn
- 1773 Thomas Brown, Ballyslattery
- 1774 William Blood, jnr, Roxton
- 1775 Poole Westropp, Fortan
- 1776 Pierce Creagh, Dangan
- 1777 James O'Brien, Ennis
- 1778 Andrew Creagh, Cahiebane.
- 1779 William Stamer, Carnelly
- 1780 Edward William Burton, Clifden
- 1781 Joseph Peacock, Barntick
- 1782 Poole Hickman, Kilmore
- 1783 Hon. Henry Edward O'Brien, Ballyboro
- 1784 William Stacpoole, Annagh
- 1785 Thomas Studdert, Bunratty
- 1786 Donogh O'Brien, Cratloe
- 1787 Edward O'Brien, Ennis
- 1788 Francis Drew, Drewsborough
- 1789 Francis M'Namara, Moyriesk
- 1790 William Daxon, Fountain
- 1791 William Spaight, Corbally
- 1792 Laurence Comyn, Birchfield
- 1793 Henry Brady, Raheens
- 1794 George Studdert, Clonderlaw
- 1795 Samuel Spaight, Clare Lodge
- 1796 Thomas Morony, Milltown Malbay
- 1797 Jonas Studdert, Claremont
- 1798 William Nugent Macnamara, Doolin
- 1799 George Studdert, Kilkishen
- 1800 William Burton, Clifden

== Part of the United Kingdom of Great Britain and Ireland ==
=== House of Hanover ===
- 1801 Thomas Steele, Cullane
- 1802 James Molony, Kiltanan
- 1803 Christopher Lysaght, Woodmount
- 1804 Robert Westropp of Fortanne
- 1805 Thomas Studdert, jnr of Bunratty
- 1806 Bindon Scott, Cahercon
- 1807 John O'Callaghan, Maryfort
- 1808 Thomas Brown, Tyredagh
- 1809 Thomas Studdert, Kilkishen
- 1810 William Scott, Knoppoge
- 1811 Thady M'Namara, Ayle
- 1812 Thomas Mahon of Ennis
- 1813 James O'Brien, Woodfield
- 1814 Poole Gabbett, Castlekeale
- 1815 Richard Studdert, Clonderalaw
- 1816 Donat O'Brien, Cratloe
- 1817 Edward B. Armstrong, Ennis
- 1818 George William Stamer, Carnelly
- 1819 Bindon Blood, Rockforest
- 1820 John M'Donnell, Newhall
- 1821 William Casey, Seafield
- 1822 Poole Hickman, Kilmore
- 1823 John Vandeleur, Ralahine
- 1824 Rt. Hon. John Ormsby Vandeleur of Kilrush
- 1825 John Singleton, Quinville
- 1826 Andrew Finnucane of Ennistimon
- 1827 Richard John Stacpoole of Edenvale, Ennis
- 1828 James Molony, Kiltanan
- 1829 Simon George Purdon
- 1830 Augustine Fitzgerald Butler, of Ballyline
- 1831 George Studdert, Clonderalaw
- 1832 Crofton Moore Vandeleur of Kilrush House, Kilrush
- 1833 Hugh Dillon Massey, 2nd Baronet of Summer Hill, O'Brien's Bridge
- 1834 Charles Mahon, Cahercalla
- 1835 Lucius O'Brien
- 1836 John O'Brien, of Elmvale
- 1837 John M'Mahon, Firgrove
- 1838 Thomas Crowe, Dromore House, Ruan
- 1839 Francis M'Namara, of Doolin (son of William, HS 1798)
- 1840 John Bindon Scott
- 1841 Hugh O'Loughlen of Port
- 1842 William FitzGerald, Adelphi
- 1843 William Skerrett, Finavarra
- 1844 William Butler, of Bunnahow
- 1845 Hugh Palliser Hickman, Fenloe
- 1846 Michael Finucane Stamerpark
- 1847 Robert A. Studdert, Kilkishen
- 1848 Henry S. Burton, Carrigaholt
- 1849 Sir Edward FitzGerald, 3rd Baronet, of Carrigoran, Newmarket-on-Fergus
- 1850 Major William Hawkins Ball of Fortfergus
- 1851 James Butler, Castlecrine.
- 1852 Edmond John Armstrong, Willowbank.
- 1853 William Edward Armstrong M'Donnell, Newhall, Ennis.
- 1854 Edward Percival Westby of Roebuck Castle, Dundrum.
- 1855 Charles George O'Callaghan of Ballynahinch, Tulla.
- 1856 Francis Gore of Tyredagh.
- 1857 Francis Macnamara Calcutt.
- 1858 James O'Brien of Ballinalacken.
- 1859 Andrew Stacpoole
- 1860 Wainright Crowe of Cahercalla.
- 1861 Burdett Moroney of Miltown.
- 1862 Hon. Edward O'Brien.
- 1863 William Thomas Butler, jnr, of Bunnahow.
- 1864 Richard Stacpoole, jnr, of Edenvale, Ennis.
- 1865 William Mills Molony, Kiltanan.
- 1866 John Wilson Lynch, Belvoir.
- 1867 Edmund Maghlin Blood, of Brickhill.
- 1868 James Thomas Foster Vesey FitzGerald, of Moyriesk.
- 1869 Robert William Carey Reeves, Burrane, Knock.
- 1870 Francis Nathaniel Valentine Burton, of Carrigaholt Castle.
- 1871 Sir Augustine FitzGerald.
- 1872 Hector Stewart Vandeleur, of Kilrush.
- 1873 Cornelius Alexander Keogh, of Birchfield, Liscannor
- 1874 Richard Studdert, Bunratty.
- 1875 Horace Stafford O'Brien, Cratloe Woods.
- 1876 Stephen Roland Woulfe, Teermaclane, Ennis.
- 1877 Thomas Crowe, Dromore.
- 1878 Nicholas Smith O'Gorman, Belleview, Kilrush.
- 1879 James Frost, Ballymorris.
- 1880 George Thomas Stacpoole Mahon, Corbally.
- 1881 Theobald Butler, of Ballyline.
- 1882 William Wilson FitzGerald, Adelphi.
- 1883 Bagot Blood, of Templemaley
- 1884 Francis William Hickman, of Kilmore.
- 1885 Henry Valentine M'Namara of Ennistimon (son of Francis, HS 1839).
- 1886 William Conyngham Vandeleur Burton (Conyngham), of Carrigaholt Castle.
- 1887 Col. Charles Synge of Mountcallan.
- 1888 Henry Vassal D'Esterre of Rossmanaher.
- 1889 John Vandeleur Phelps of Waterpark.
- 1890 Col. Arthur Hare Vincent of Summerhill.
- 1891 Robert G. Parker of Ballyvally.
- 1892 William James Macnamara of Ennistymon. (brother of Henry Valentine, HS 1885)
- 1893 John O'Connell Bianconi.
- 1894 Richard John Stacpoole of Edenvale, Ennis.
- 1896 Erasmus Vandeleur Westby of Kilballyowen.
- 1897 William Walter Augustine FitzGerald.
- 1898 Lucius William O'Brien of Dromoland, Newmarket-on-Fergus.
- 1899 Lt-Col. Frederick St Leger Tottenham of Mount Callan.
- 1900 Sir Michael O'Loghlen, 4th Baronet.

== House of Windsor ==
- 1900 William Hawkins Ball.
- 1901 Robert O'Brien Studdert.
- 1903 John Michael Aylward Lewis of Ballynagar.
- 1905 Marcus Thomas Francis Keane of Beech Park.
- 1906 Torlogh O'Brien of Ballynalacken Castle.
- 1907 Thomas Henry Brady Browne of New Grove.
- 1908 William Beresford Molony of Kiltanon.
- 1909 Stopford Cosby Hickman of Fenloe.
- 1910 Sir Michael O'Loghlen, 4th Baronet of Drumconora, Ennis
- 1911 James Roche Kelly.
- 1913 Captain Alexander M. Vandeleur of Cahircon.
- 1914 Thomas George Gabbett Studdert.
- 1919 George O'Callaghan-Westropp.
- 1920 Henry Valentine M'Namara.
- 1921 Charles Fitzgerald Blood.
