= 1877 County Clare by-election =

UK Parliamentary by-election

The 1877 County Clare by-election was fought on 13 August 1877. The by-election was fought due to the death of the incumbent Home Rule MP, Sir Colman O'Loghlen. It was won by the Home Rule candidate Sir Bryan O'Loghlen. The result was remarkable in that O'Loghlen did not seek the nomination and was elected without his consent. He refused to take his seat as he was Attorney-General of Victoria. This position was considered an office of profit and thus disqualified him from membership of the House of Commons. A select committee was established to consider the issue and reported in 1879. They found that this was the case and the seat was declared vacant. Some controversy remained because O'Loghlen's position was in a colony and not in the United Kingdom. A writ was moved for another by-election in 1879.

1877 County Clare by-election
| Party | Candidate | Votes | % | ±% |
|---|---|---|---|---|
| Home Rule | Sir Bryan O'Loghlen | 1,721 | 47.2 | |
| Ind. Nationalist | O'Gorman Mahon | 1,149 | 31.5 | |
| Irish Conservative | Robert Carey Reeves | 764 | 20.9 | +2.9 |
| Home Rule | Francis Burton | 15 | 0.4 | |
| Majority | | 572 | 15.7 | −3.5 |
| Turnout | | 3,649 | 68.9 | |
| Home Rule hold | | Swing | -18.9 | |
