= 1869 County Clare by-election =

UK parliamentary by-election

The 1869 County Clare by-election for the British House of Commons took place on 5 January 1869. The by-election was held due to the incumbent Liberal MP, Sir Colman O'Loghlen, accepting office as Judge Advocate General. It was retained by O'Loghlen who was unopposed.
