= Lord Francis Conyngham =

Irish politician

Lord Francis Nathaniel Conyngham (24 September 1832 – 14 September 1880) was an Irish politician who sat in the United Kingdom Parliament as a member of parliament.

== Background ==
Conyngham was a younger son of Francis Conyngham, 2nd Marquess Conyngham and Lady Jane (née Paget), daughter of Field Marshal Henry Paget, 1st Marquess of Anglesey. He served in the Royal Navy and reached the rank of Lieutenant.

== Political career ==
Conyngham was returned to Parliament for County Clare in 1857, a seat he held until 1859 and again between 1874 and 1880.

On 11 September 1867 he was commissioned as a Captain in the part-time Donegal Artillery Militia (Prince of Wales's).

== Personal life ==
Conyngham married the Hon. Georgiana Charlotte, daughter of the 1st Baron Tredegar, in 1857. There were no children from the marriage. He died in Gloucester, in September 1880, aged 47.

His wife later remarried and died in April 1886.

Parliament of the United Kingdom
Preceded by Sir John Forster FitzGerald; Cornelius O'Brien	Member of Parliament for County Clare; 1857–1859; With: Francis Macnamara Calcutt	Succeeded by Crofton Moore Vandeleur; Luke White
Preceded by Crofton Moore Vandeleur; Sir Colman O'Loghlen, Bt	Member of Parliament for County Clare; 1874–1880; With: Sir Colman O'Loghlen, Bt 1874–1877; Sir Bryan O'Loghlen, Bt 1877–1879; James Patrick Mahon 1879–1880	Succeeded by James Patrick Mahon; William O'Shea
