= Francis Macnamara Calcutt =

Irish politician

Francis Macnamara Calcultt MP

Member of Parliament for County Clare
- In office 13 April 1860 – 16 July 1863 Serving with Crofton Moore Vandeleur
- Preceded by: Luke White; Crofton Moore Vandeleur
- Succeeded by: Colman O'Loghlen; Crofton Moore Vandeleur
- In office 16 April 1857 – 13 May 1859 Serving with Lord Francis Conyngham
- Preceded by: Cornelius O'Brien; John Forster FitzGerald
- Succeeded by: Luke White; Crofton Moore Vandeleur

Personal details
- Born: 1819 Limrick, Ireland
- Died: 16 July 1863 (aged 1819)
- Party: Liberal
- Other political affiliations: Independent Irish (until 1859)

Francis Macnamara Calcutt (1819 – 16 July 1863) was an Irish Liberal and Independent Irish Party politician.

The son of William Calcutt and Dora Macnamara, he was elected as an Independent Irish Member of Parliament (MP) for County Clare in 1857 but was defeated at the next election in 1859. He regained the seat as a Liberal MP in a by-election in 1860, and remained in post until his death in 1863. He had married Georgina Martyn in 1842.

He was High Sheriff of Clare in 1857.

Parliament of the United Kingdom
Preceded by Luke White; Crofton Moore Vandeleur	Member of Parliament for County Clare; 1860 – 1863; With: Crofton Moore Vandeleur	Succeeded by Colman O'Loghlen; Crofton Moore Vandeleur
Preceded by Cornelius O'Brien; John Forster FitzGerald	Member of Parliament for County Clare; 1857 – 1859; With: Lord Francis Conyngham	Succeeded by Luke White; Crofton Moore Vandeleur
