= Maurice O'Connell (MP) =

Irish politician

Maurice O'Connell (June 1803 – 18 June 1853) was one of seven children (the eldest of four sons) of the Irish Nationalist leader Daniel and Mary O'Connell. He served in British Parliament as Member of Parliament (MP) for Tralee from 1832 to 1837, and from 1838 until his death.

O'Connell attended Miss Everina Wollstonecraft's school, Dublin, in 1810, Edward Whyte's school, Dublin, in 1813, Clongowes Wood College in 1815, Trinity College Dublin, in 1819, and King's Inns in 1821.

In 1832 he married Mary, daughter of Bindon Scott of County Clare, and they had several children. The marriage was unhappy and Maurice is said to have had numerous affairs; some of the stories of his father's womanising are said to be based on Maurice's actions. His conduct, combined with chronic ill-health, wrecked his political career. Though described as "frank, popular and enthusiastic" he never lived up to the hopes his father and others had for him.

In 1834 he held the position of Director of the National Bank of Ireland.

His brothers John, Morgan and Daniel were also MPs.

== See also ==
- O'Connell of Derrynane

== Sources ==
- Leigh Rayment's Peerage Pages
- Erin I. Bishop, The World of Mary O'Connell, 1778–1836 (Lilliput Press, Dublin, 1999), p. 15

== Citations ==
Parliament of the United Kingdom
Preceded by James Patrick Mahon and William Nugent Macnamara	Member of Parliament for County Clare; 1831–1832; With: William Nugent Macnamara	Succeeded by Cornelius O'Brien and William Nugent MacNamara
Preceded by Walker Ferrand	Member of Parliament for Tralee; 1832–1837	Succeeded by John Bateman
Preceded by John Bateman	Member of Parliament for Tralee; 1838–1853	Succeeded by Daniel O'Connell
