= John O'Connell Bianconi =

Irish landowner and entrepreneur (1871-1929)

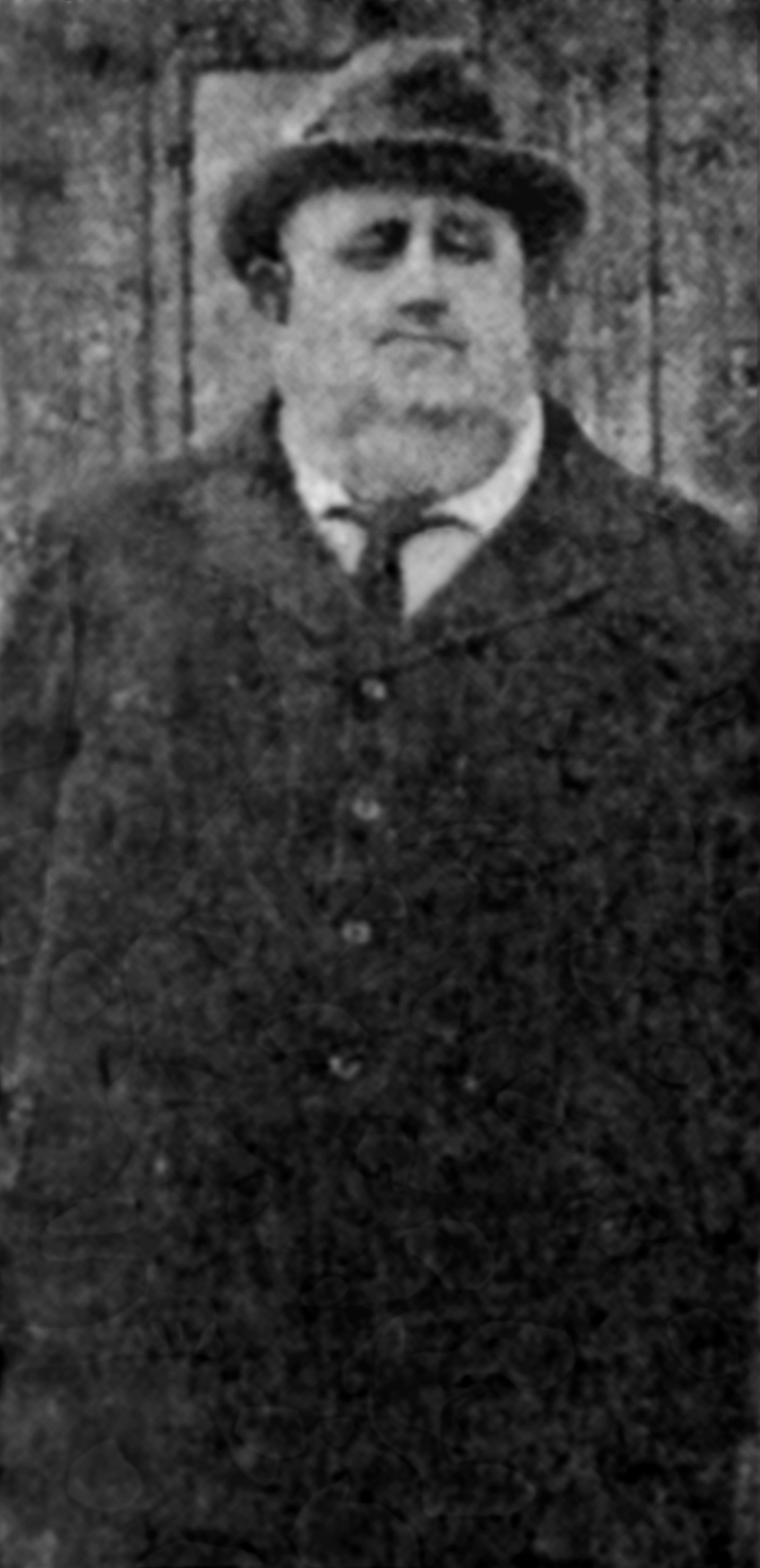
John Charles William Coppinger O’Connell Bianconi (1871-1929)

John Charles William Coppinger O’Connell (19 October 1871 – 14 October 1929), later known as John Charles William Coppinger O’Connell Bianconi was an Irish land-owner and entrepreneur active in County Clare.

He was the son of Morgan John O'Connell (MP for County Kerry and a nephew of Daniel O'Connell) and his wife Mary Anne Bianconi, the daughter of Italian immigrant and entrepreneur Charles Bianconi. He was raised in Ballylean House. He was High Sheriff of Clare, a Justice of the Peace, an officer in the National Volunteers, prominent in the Land commission and co-operative movement and a popular landlord.

== Heritage ==
A bar in Kildysart, "The Bianconi" was named in his honor (now changed to "Mitchells Bar").
