= 1887 County Carlow by-election =

UK Parliamentary by-election

The 1887 County Carlow by-election was a parliamentary by-election held for the United Kingdom House of Commons constituency of County Carlow on 24 August 1887. It arose as a result of the death of the sitting member, John Aloysius Blake on 22 May. Eighty-seven-year-old James Patrick Mahon, who had formerly sat in Parliament for the constituencies of Clare and Ennis, was nominated as an Irish Nationalist. No other candidate being nominated, Mahon was elected unopposed. He held the seat until his death four years later.
