= Lucius O'Brien, 13th Baron Inchiquin =

British politician

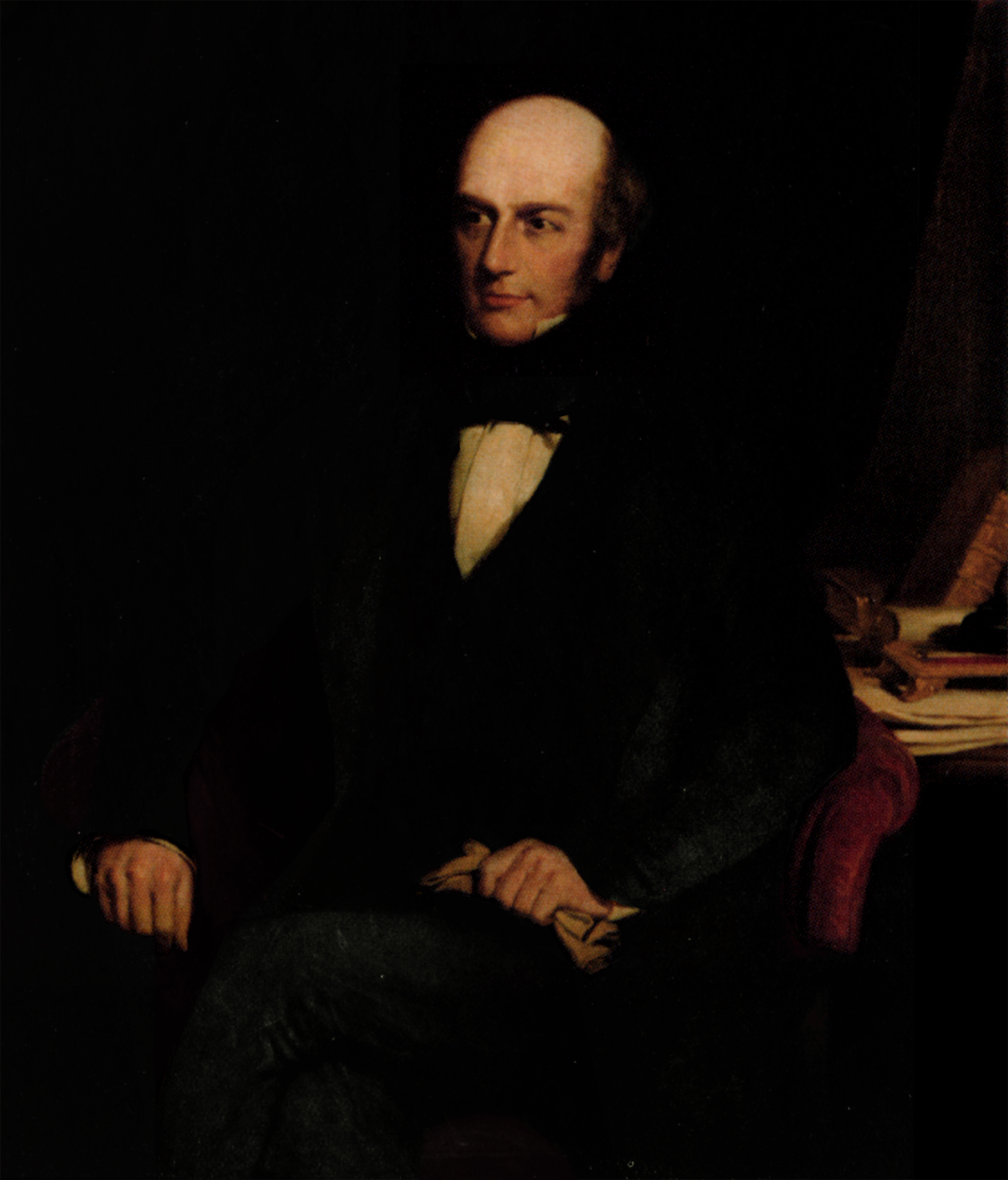
Sir Lucius O'Brien painted about 1840 by Stephen Catterson Smith

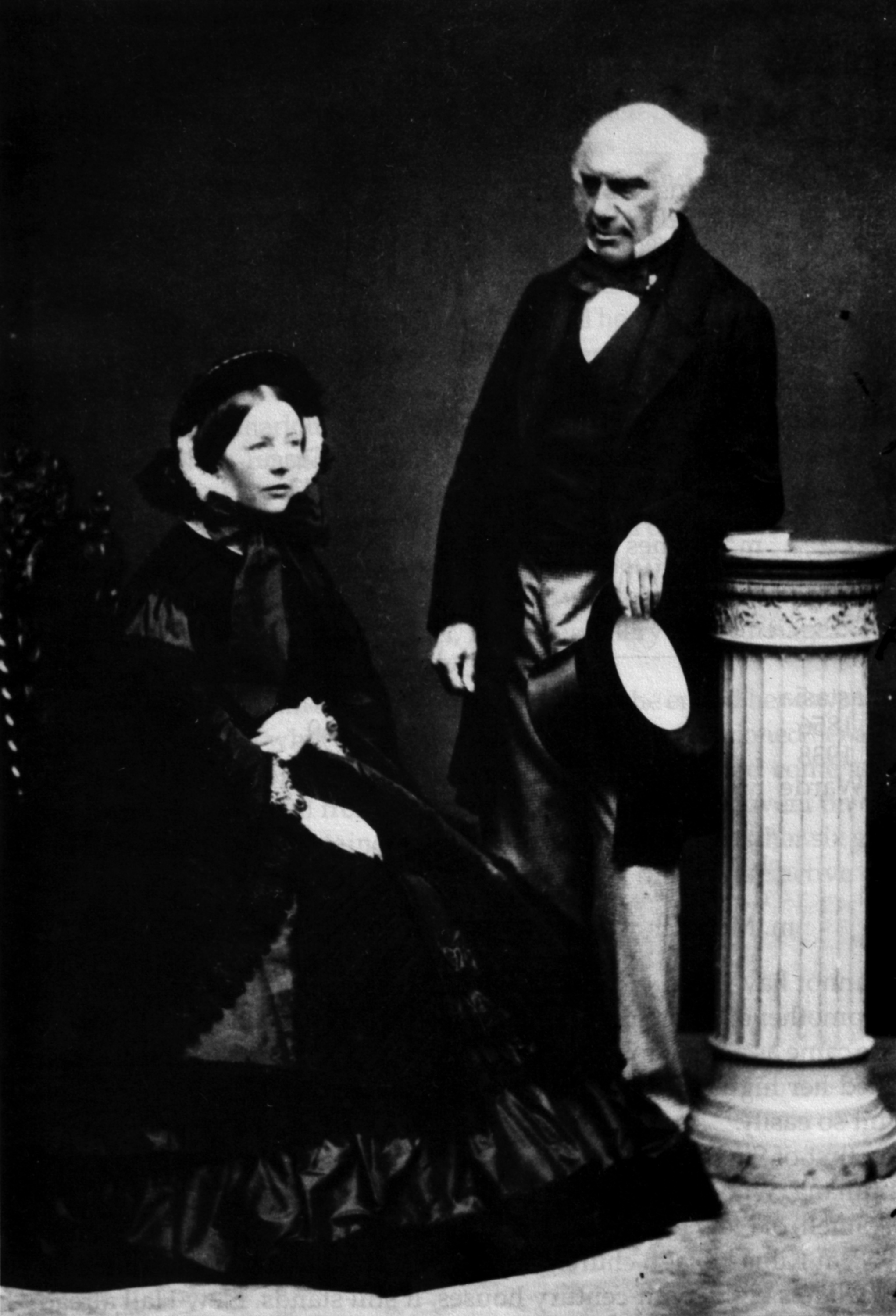
Sir Lucius O'Brien with his second wife Louisa Finucane

Lucius (McEdward) O'Brien, 13th Baron Inchiquin (5 December 1800 – 22 March 1872), known as Sir Lucius O'Brien, 5th Baronet from 1837 to 1855, was an Irish politician and nobleman. He is remembered respectfully in County Clare for his relief work during the famine years.

== Biography ==
He was born at Dromoland Castle in 1800, the eldest son of Sir Edward O'Brien, 4th Baronet and Charlotte Smith. He was educated at Harrow and Trinity College, Cambridge, graduating with a B.A. in 1825. In 1826, he succeeded his father as the Tory Member of Parliament for County Clare, but was unseated in 1830 by Whig candidates. He unsuccessfully contested the county again in 1835, but was instead appointed High Sheriff of Clare for that year. Upon the death of his father in 1837, he succeeded to the baronetcy and was appointed Lord Lieutenant of Clare in 1843.

He again contested Clare in 1847, topping the poll and ousting Cornelius O'Brien. In 1848, he published a book, Ireland in 1848: The Late Famine and the Poor Laws. That same year, his brother William Smith O'Brien, a Liberal, led an abortive rebellion and narrowly escaped hanging. O'Brien did not contest Clare in 1852.

In 1855, he inherited the title of Baron Inchiquin from his ninth cousin, the last Marquess of Thomond, and was confirmed in this right by the Lords Committee of Privileges in 1862. He was elected as an Irish representative peer in 1863. He died in 1872 at Dromoland and was succeeded by his son Edward O'Brien, 14th Baron Inchiquin.

== Family ==
O'Brien married in 1837 Mary FitzGerald, daughter of William FitzGerald of Adelphi and Corofin, and together they had six children:

- Edward O'Brien, 14th Baron Inchiquin (1839–1900)
- Hon. Charlotte Anne O'Brien (d.1918), who married in 1866 Rev. George Stopford Ram (1838–1889), a maternal grandson of the 3rd Earl of Courtown, and left nine children.
- Hon. Mary Grace O'Brien (d.1912), who married in 1874 Abel John Ram, brother of her sister's husband, and left four children.
- Hon. Juliana Cecilia O'Brien (d.1925), married William Edward Armstrong Macdonnell of Newhall
- Hon. Ellen Geraldine O'Brien (d.1860)
- Hon. Augusta Louisa Jane O'Brien (d.1861)

After the death of his first wife, he remarried in 1854 Louisa Finucane, daughter of Major James Finucane, and had another seven children:

- Hon. Anastasia Kathleen Lucia O'Brien (1856–1938)
- Hon. Lucius Murrough O'Brien (1857–1939)
- Hon. Nora Louisa Jane O'Brien (1859–1927)
- Hon. Blanche Louisa O'Brien (1860–1945)
- Hon. Alica Amabel O'Brien (1860–1939)
- Hon. William Henry Ernest Robert Turlough O'Brien (1863–1943)
- Hon. Louisa Anna Maria O'Brien (1863–1940)

== Notes ==
Parliament of the United Kingdom
Preceded by Sir Edward O'Brien, Bt; William Vesey-FitzGerald	Member of Parliament for County Clare; 1826–1830; With: William Vesey-FitzGerald 1826–1828; Daniel O'Connell 1828–1830	Succeeded by William Nugent MacNamara; James Patrick Mahon
Preceded by Cornelius O'Brien; William Nugent MacNamara	Member of Parliament for County Clare; 1847–1852; With: William Nugent MacNamara	Succeeded by Sir John Forster FitzGerald; Cornelius O'Brien
Honorary titles
Preceded by The Lord FitzGerald and Vesey	Lord Lieutenant of Clare; 1843–1872	Succeeded by Charles William White
Political offices
Preceded by The Lord Downes	Representative peer for Ireland; 1863–1872	Succeeded by The Earl of Wicklow
Peerage of Ireland
Preceded by James O'Brien	Baron Inchiquin; 1855–1872	Succeeded by Edward O'Brien
Baronetage of Ireland
Preceded by Edward O'Brien	Baronet (of Leaghmenagh); 1837–1872	Succeeded by Edward O'Brien
