= Matthias Finucane =

Irish barrister and judge

Matthias Finucane (1737–1814) was an Irish barrister and judge of the late eighteenth and early nineteenth centuries. He is notable chiefly for divorcing his wife, which was an unusual move for the time.

== Career ==
He was born in Ennis, County Clare, the only son of Andrew Finucane (born 1680) and Joanna Hewitt. Though his father was described as an apothecary, which was then considered to be a rather humble occupation, he clearly prospered in his business. Matthias went to Trinity College Dublin, where he matriculated in 1755, and entered Middle Temple in 1759. He was called to the Irish Bar in 1764 and became King's Counsel in 1784. He was a member of the well-known drinking club called The Monks of the Screw (or the Order of St. Patrick) founded by John Philpot Curran in about 1780.

He was appointed a judge of the Court of Common Pleas (Ireland) in 1794, having been originally intended for the Court of Exchequer (Ireland). Though he is said to have owed his appointment to his friendship with John Fitzgibbon, 1st Earl of Clare, the Lord Chancellor of Ireland, he was highly regarded as a judge. William Norcott, the barrister and poet, in his 1805 poem The Metropolis, praised him for his honesty and commonsense. He presided at a number of the trials resulting from the Irish Rebellion of 1798. After the failure of the Irish rebellion of 1803, he was one of the members of the Special Commission which was set up to try the rebels. He retired in 1806 and died in County Clare in 1814.

He divided his time between his Dublin townhouse in Kildare Street, his estate at Lifford, County Clare, and Ennistymon House, which came to him through marriage.

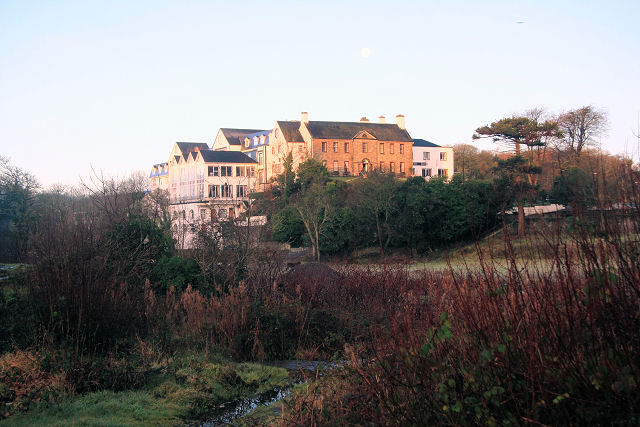
Ennistymon House, which Finucane acquired by his marriage into the O'Brien family

== Family ==
In 1775 he married Anne, daughter of Edward O'Brien of Ennistymon, County Clare and his wife Susanna O'Brien of Stonehall; she was only about sixteen at the time of the marriage. They had three children: Andrew, the only son and heir, Susanna who married the politician William Nugent Macnamara, and Jane who married her cousin James Finucane.

== Divorce ==
Finucane's Divorce Act 1793
- Act of Parliament
- Parliament of Ireland
- Long title: An Act to dissolve the marriage of Mathias Finucane, esquire, with Anne Finucane, otherwise O'Brien, his now wife, and to enable him to marry again, and for other purposes therein mentioned.
- Citation: 33 Geo. 3. c. 6 Pr. (I)

Dates
- Royal assent: 16 August 1793

The marriage was an unhappy one: both husband and wife had love affairs, and the judge fathered several illegitimate children, including John, who was mentioned in his half-brother Andrew's will. According to a longstanding family tradition, the Guernsey-based portraitist Matthias Finucane (died 1810), who was Irish by birth, was another of the judge's illegitimate children.

In 1793 the judge divorced Anne by a private act of Parliament, Finucane's Divorce Act 1793 (33 Geo. 3. c. 6 Pr. (I)), on the grounds of her adultery with his cousin Lieutenant Donal Finucane. The act was eventually repealed in 2012, under the Statute Law Revision Act 2012 (No 19). Anne and Donal subsequently married and had several children: she died at Boulogne in 1844. Although the act explicitly allowed Matthias to remarry, he never did so.

The judge's only son Andrew had no issue, and on his death in 1843 the family estates passed to the heirs of his sister Susanna Macnamara, who had died in 1819. Among her descendants was the author Caitlin Thomas, who married the celebrated poet Dylan Thomas.

== Sources ==
- Ball, F. Elrington The Judges in Ireland 1221-1921 London: John Murray, 1926
- Burke, Bernard The General Armory of England, Scotland, Ireland and Wales London: Harrison, 1884
- Genealogy of the Finucane Family of County Clare with illustration of arms, compiled by Philip Crosbie 1929 National Library of Ireland Genealogical Office Ms. 558
- Irish Times; May 12, 2012
- Speech of John Philpot Curran in defence of Mr. Peter Finnerty on 22 December 1797
