= County Clare (UK Parliament constituency) =

UK parliamentary constituency in Ireland, 1801–1885

- Former county constituency for the House of Commons
- County Clare within Ireland
- County: County Clare

1801–1885
- Seats: 2
- Created from: County Clare
- Replaced by: East Clare; West Clare

County Clare was a parliamentary constituency in Ireland, represented in the Parliament of the United Kingdom. From 1801 to 1885 it returned two Members of Parliament (MPs) to the House of Commons of the United Kingdom of Great Britain and Ireland.

At the 1885 general election, County Clare was split into two divisions: East Clare and West Clare.

== Boundaries ==
This constituency comprised the whole of County Clare, except for the borough of Ennis.

== Members of Parliament ==
Year	First member	First party	Second member	Second party
1801	Francis Nathaniel Burton		Hugh Massey	
1802	Francis Nathaniel Burton		Sir Edward O'Brien, 4th Baronet	Whig
1808	Augustine FitzGerald	Tory	Sir Edward O'Brien, 4th Baronet	Whig
1818	William Vesey-FitzGerald	Tory	Sir Edward O'Brien, 4th Baronet	Whig
1826	William Vesey-FitzGerald	Tory	Lucius O'Brien	Tory
1828	Daniel O'Connell	Radical	Lucius O'Brien	Tory
1830	William Nugent Macnamara	Repeal Association	James Patrick Mahon	Whig
1831	William Nugent Macnamara	Repeal Association	Maurice O'Connell	Repeal Association
1832	William Nugent Macnamara	Repeal Association	Cornelius O'Brien	Repeal Association
1847	William Nugent Macnamara	Repeal Association	Sir Lucius O'Brien, 5th Baronet	Conservative
1852	Sir John Forster Fitzgerald	Whig	Cornelius O'Brien	Ind. Irish
1857	Lord Francis Conyngham	Ind. Irish	Francis Macnamara Calcutt	Ind. Irish
1859	Crofton Moore Vandeleur	Conservative	Luke White	Liberal
1860	Crofton Moore Vandeleur	Conservative	Francis Macnamara Calcutt	Liberal
1863	Crofton Moore Vandeleur	Conservative	Sir Colman O'Loghlen, 2nd Baronet	Liberal
1874	Lord Francis Conyngham	Irish Nationalist	Sir Colman O'Loghlen, 2nd Baronet	Irish Nationalist
1877	Lord Francis Conyngham	Irish Nationalist	Sir Bryan O'Loghlen, 3rd Baronet	Irish Nationalist
1879	Lord Francis Conyngham	Irish Nationalist	James Patrick Mahon	Irish Nationalist
1880	William O'Shea	Independent Nationalist	James Patrick Mahon	Irish Nationalist
1885	Constituency divided into East Clare and West Clare			

== Elections ==
=== Elections in the 1820s ===
By-election 5 July 1828: Clare
Party	Candidate	Votes	%	±%
Radical	Daniel O'Connell	2,057	67.69	
Tory	William Vesey Fitzgerald	982	32.31	
Majority		1,075	35.38	N/A
Turnout		3.039		
Radical gain from Tory		Swing		

=== Elections in the 1830s ===
General election 1830: Clare
Party	Candidate	Votes	%
Repeal	William Nugent Macnamara	664	39.9
Whig	James Patrick Mahon	571	34.3
Tory	Lucius O'Brien	399	24.0
Whig	William Richard Mahon	18	1.1
Whig	Burton Binden	12	0.7
Turnout		c. 832	c. 51.9
Registered electors		1,604	
Majority		265	15.9
Repeal gain from Tory			
Majority		172	10.3
Whig gain from Tory			

On petition, Mahon was unseated and a by-election was called.

By-election, 23 March 1831: Clare
Party	Candidate	Votes	%	±%
Repeal	Maurice O'Connell	325	64.7	+24.8
Whig	Edward O'Brien	177	35.3	−0.8
Majority		148	29.4	N/A
Turnout		502	c. 33.2	c. −18.7
Registered electors		c. 1,514		
Repeal gain from Whig		Swing	+12.8	

General election 1831: Clare
Party	Candidate	Votes	%	±%
Repeal	William Nugent Macnamara	883	44.7	+4.8
Repeal	Maurice O'Connell	597	30.2	N/A
Whig	James Patrick Mahon	493	25.0	−9.3
Whig	William Richard Mahon	1	0.1	N/A
Majority		104	5.2	−10.7
Turnout		c. 987	c. 65.2	c. +13.3
Registered electors		1,514		
Repeal hold		Swing	+4.8	
Repeal gain from Whig		Swing		

General election 1832: Clare
Party	Candidate	Votes	%	±%
Repeal	William Nugent Macnamara	920	32.5	−12.2
Repeal	Cornelius O'Brien	897	31.6	+1.4
Tory	John Macdonnell	701	24.7	New
Tory	Augustine Butler	317	11.2	New
Majority		196	6.9	+1.7
Turnout		1,557	61.8	c. −3.4
Registered electors		2,518		
Repeal hold		Swing	−12.2	
Repeal hold		Swing	+1.4	

General election 1835: Clare
Party	Candidate	Votes	%	±%
Repeal (Whig)	William Nugent Macnamara	686	50.0	+17.5
Repeal (Whig)	Cornelius O'Brien	686	50.0	+18.4
Conservative	Lucius O'Brien	0	0.0	−24.7
Conservative	Crofton Moore Vandeleur	0	0.0	−11.2
Majority		686	50.0	+43.1
Turnout		686	25.7	−36.1
Registered electors		2,671		
Repeal hold		Swing	+17.8	
Repeal hold		Swing	+18.2	

- Lucius O'Brien and Vandeleur declined the contest

General election 1837: Clare
Party	Candidate	Votes	%
Repeal (Whig)	William Nugent Macnamara	Unopposed	
Repeal (Whig)	Cornelius O'Brien	Unopposed	
Registered electors		3,141	
Repeal hold			
Repeal hold			

=== Elections in the 1840s ===
General election 1841: Clare
Party	Candidate	Votes	%	±%
Repeal	William Nugent Macnamara	1,079	44.6	N/A
Repeal	Cornelius O'Brien	1,072	44.3	N/A
Conservative	Crofton Moore Vandeleur	222	9.2	New
Conservative	James Molony	47	1.9	New
Majority		850	35.1	N/A
Turnout		1,338	72.4	N/A
Registered electors		1,848		
Repeal hold		Swing	N/A	
Repeal hold		Swing	N/A	

General election 1847: Clare
Party	Candidate	Votes	%	±%
Conservative	Lucius O'Brien	809	32.2	+23.0
Repeal	William Nugent Macnamara	723	28.8	−15.8
Repeal	Cornelius O'Brien	584	23.3	−21.0
Conservative	William Fitzgerald	395	15.7	+13.8
Turnout		1,256 (est)	56.7 (est)	−15.7
Registered electors		2,216		
Majority		225	8.9	N/A
Conservative gain from Repeal		Swing	+20.7	
Majority		139	5.5	−29.6
Repeal hold		Swing	−17.1	

=== Elections in the 1850s ===
General election 1852: Clare
Party	Candidate	Votes	%	±%
Whig	John Forster FitzGerald	1,152	33.0	New
Independent Irish	Cornelius O'Brien	1,141	32.7	+9.4
Conservative	Crofton Moore Vandeleur	1,139	32.6	+0.4
Conservative	William Stackpoole	60	1.7	−14.0
Turnout		2,286 (est)	88.6 (est)	+31.9
Registered electors		2,581		
Majority		11	0.3	N/A
Whig gain from Repeal		Swing	N/A	
Majority		2	0.1	N/A
Independent Irish gain from Conservative		Swing	+8.1	

On petition, Fitzgerald and O'Brien were unseated, due to a "system of intimidation" being present at the 1852 election, and a writ was moved for a by-election.

By-election, 4 July 1853: Clare
Party	Candidate	Votes	%	±%
Independent Irish	Cornelius O'Brien	1,376	34.2	+1.5
Whig	John Forster FitzGerald	1,351	33.5	+0.5
Conservative	Crofton Moore Vandeleur	1,299	32.2	−2.1
Independent	Henry Stuart Burton	3	0.0	New
Turnout		2,663 (est)	84.7 (est)	−3.9
Registered electors		3,144		
Majority		25	0.7	+0.6
Independent Irish hold		Swing	+1.3	
Majority		52	1.3	+1.0
Whig hold		Swing	+0.8	

General election 1857: Clare
Party	Candidate	Votes	%	±%
Independent Irish	Francis Conyngham	2,894	52.3	N/A
Independent Irish	Francis Macnamara Calcutt	1,390	25.1	N/A
Whig	John Forster Fitzgerald	1,249	22.6	−10.4
Independent Irish	Luke White	1	0.0	N/A
Majority		141	2.5	+2.4
Turnout		2,767 (est)	73.9 (est)	−14.7
Registered electors		3,745		
Independent Irish hold		Swing		
Independent Irish gain from Whig		Swing		

General election 1859: Clare
Party	Candidate	Votes	%	±%
Conservative	Crofton Moore Vandeleur	3,829	47.5	New
Liberal	Luke White	2,234	27.7	+27.7
Liberal	Francis Macnamara Calcutt	1,997	24.8	−0.3
Majority		1,595	19.8	N/A
Turnout		4,030 (est)	73.2 (est)	−0.7
Registered electors		5,509		
Conservative gain from Independent Irish		Swing	N/A	
Liberal hold		Swing		

=== Elections in the 1860s ===
On petition, White was unseated, causing a by-election.

By-election, 13 Apr 1860: Clare
Party	Candidate	Votes	%	±%
Liberal	Francis Macnamara Calcutt	2,993	72.3	+47.5
Liberal	Charles White	1,149	27.7	N/A
Majority		1,844	44.6	N/A
Turnout		4,142	75.2	+2.0
Registered electors		5,509		
Liberal hold		Swing	N/A	

Calcutt died, causing a by-election.

By-election, 3 Aug 1863: Clare
Party	Candidate	Votes	%	±%
Liberal	Colman O'Loghlen	Unopposed		
Registered electors		5,563		
Liberal hold				

General election 1865: Clare
Party	Candidate	Votes	%	±%
Liberal	Colman O'Loghlen	Unopposed		
Conservative	Crofton Moore Vandeleur	Unopposed		
Registered electors		5,465		
Liberal hold				
Conservative hold				

General election 1868: Clare
Party	Candidate	Votes	%	±%
Liberal	Colman O'Loghlen	Unopposed		
Conservative	Crofton Moore Vandeleur	Unopposed		
Registered electors		5,649		
Liberal hold				
Conservative hold				

O'Loghlen was appointed Judge Advocate General of the Armed Forces, requiring a by-election.

By-election, 5 Jan 1869: Clare
Party	Candidate	Votes	%	±%
Liberal	Colman O'Loghlen	Unopposed		
Registered electors		5,649		
Liberal hold				

=== Elections in the 1870s ===
General election 1874: Clare
Party	Candidate	Votes	%	±%
Home Rule	Colman O'Loghlen	3,095	44.9	N/A
Home Rule	Francis Conyngham	2,565	37.2	New
Conservative	Crofton Moore Vandeleur	1,240	18.0	N/A
Majority		1,325	19.2	N/A
Turnout		4,070 (est)	74.5 (est)	N/A
Registered electors		5,460		
Home Rule gain from Conservative		Swing	N/A	
Home Rule gain from Liberal		Swing	N/A	

O'Loghlen's death caused a by-election.

By-election, 13 Aug 1877: Clare
Party	Candidate	Votes	%	±%
Home Rule	Bryan O'Loghlen	1,721	47.2	−34.9
Home Rule	James Patrick Mahon	1,149	31.5	N/A
Conservative	Robert William Cary Reeves	764	20.9	+2.9
Liberal-Conservative	Francis Nathaniel Burton	15	0.4	N/A
Majority		572	15.7	−3.5
Turnout		3,649	67.2	−7.3
Registered electors		5,427		
Home Rule hold		Swing	−18.9	

- O'Loghlen was a Liberal home rule supporter, while The O'Gorman Mahon was a Nationalist home rule supporter. Burton also supported home rule.

O'Loghlen was declared to have resigned after accepting office as Attorney General of Victoria, Australia, causing a by-election.

By-election, 13 Aug 1879: Clare
Party	Candidate	Votes	%	±%
Home Rule	James Patrick Mahon	1,661	41.5	−40.6
Conservative	Hector Stewart Vandeleur	1,531	38.3	+20.3
Liberal	Peter O'Brien	807	20.2	New
Majority		130	3.2	−16.0
Turnout		3,999	73.6	−0.9
Registered electors		5,430		
Home Rule hold		Swing	−30.5	

=== Elections in the 1880s ===
General election 1880: Clare
Party	Candidate	Votes	%	±%
Parnellite Home Rule League	James Patrick Mahon	3,283	44.8	−0.1
Parnellite Home Rule League	William O'Shea	3,133	42.8	+5.6
Conservative	Hector Stewart Vandeleur	912	12.4	−5.6
Majority		2,221	30.4	+11.2
Turnout		4,195 (est)	74.3 (est)	−0.2
Registered electors		5,643		
Home Rule hold		Swing	+1.4	
Home Rule hold		Swing	+2.8	

There was a notorious riot at Sixmilebridge on polling day in 1852, in which soldiers shot dead seven protesters.

The 1828 County Clare by-election was notable as this was the first time since the Reformation that an openly Catholic candidate was elected as an MP, Daniel O'Connell.
