= John Bateman (Tralee MP) =

Irish politician (1792 - 1863)

- Occupation: politician

John Bateman (1792 – 1 October 1863) was an Irish politician.

Bateman lived at Oak Park in Dineen, County Kerry. In 1820, he served as High Sheriff of Kerry. At the 1837 UK general election, he stood for the Conservative Party in Tralee. He won the seat, but was unseated on petition in 1838.

Parliament of the United Kingdom
Preceded by Maurice O'Connell	Member of Parliament for Tralee; 1837–1838	Succeeded by Maurice O'Connell
Civic offices
Preceded by Charles Herbert	High Sheriff of Kerry; 1819–1820	Succeeded by Arthur Blennerhassett
