= Luke White, 2nd Baron Annaly =

Anglo-Irish Liberal politician

Luke White, 2nd Baron Annaly KP (26 September 1829 – 16 March 1888), was an Anglo-Irish Liberal politician.

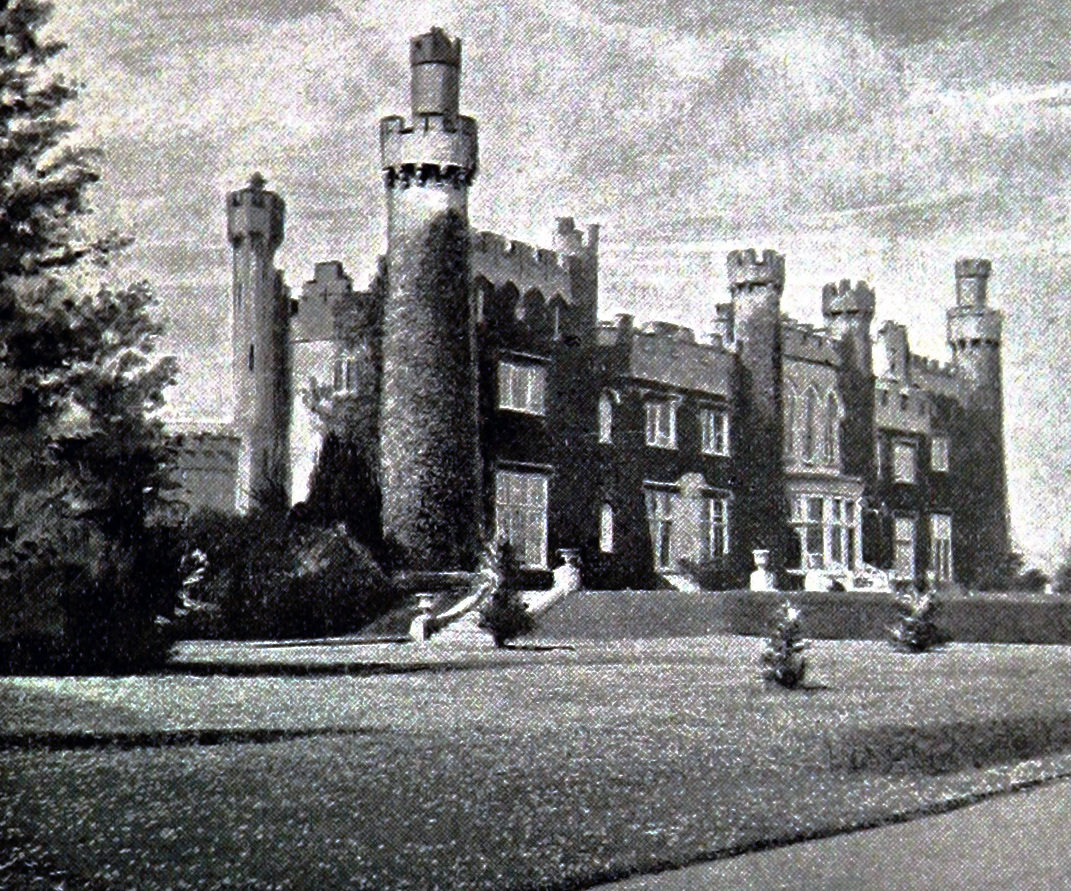
Luttrellstown Castle

Annaly was the son of Henry White, 1st Baron Annaly, and his wife Ellen (née Dempster), and was educated at Eton.

== Career ==
He served in the British Army and achieved the rank of captain in the 13th Light Dragoons. After retiring he was appointed in 1859 Lieutenant-Colonel of the part-time Royal Longford Rifle Militia (of which his father was Colonel). In 1859 he was returned to Parliament for County Clare. However he was unseated by petition the following year, and then represented County Longford from 1861 to 1862 and Kidderminster from 1862 to 1865. Annaly served in the Liberal administration of Lord Palmerston as a Junior Lord of the Treasury between 1862 and 1866. From 1868 to 1873 he was State Steward to the Lord-Lieutenant of Ireland the Earl Spencer. He also held the honorary positions of Sheriff of County Dublin in 1861 and of County Longford in 1871 and Lord-Lieutenant of County Longford from 1873 to 1874. In 1885 he was made a Knight of the Order of St Patrick.

== Family ==
Lord Annaly married Emily, daughter of James Stuart, in 1853. Their English home was Titness Park near Cheapside in Sunninghill, Berkshire. They had five sons and three daughters. All his sons had military careers, his third son Robert notably raising the Stockbrokers Battalion of the Royal Fusiliers in 1914 and later commanding 184th (2nd South Midland) Brigade with the rank of Brigadier-General.

His daughter Violet married Major Lord Percy St. Maur (in previous generations also spelt Seymour), second son of Algernon St Maur, 14th Duke of Somerset – this and the related Northumberland and Norfolk dukedoms form the main instance of a pre-Tudor major landowning dynasty which has survived.

Lord Annaly died in March 1888, aged 58, and was succeeded in the barony by his eldest son Luke. Lady Annaly died in 1915.

== Notes ==
Parliament of the United Kingdom
Preceded by Lord Francis Conyngham; Francis Macnamara Calcutt	Member of Parliament for County Clare; 1859–1860; With: Crofton Moore Vandeleur	Succeeded by Crofton Moore Vandeleur; Francis Macnamara Calcutt
Preceded by Fulke Greville-Nugent; Henry White	Member of Parliament for County Longford; 1861–1862; With: Fulke Greville-Nugent	Succeeded by Fulke Greville-Nugent; Myles O'Reilly
Preceded by Alfred Rhodes Bristow	Member of Parliament for Kidderminster; 1862–1865	Succeeded by Albert Grant
Honorary titles
Preceded by The Lord Annaly	Lord Lieutenant of Longford; 1873–1874	Succeeded by The Earl of Longford
Peerage of the United Kingdom
Preceded by Henry White	Baron Annaly; 1873–1888	Succeeded by Luke White
