= Charles Bianconi =

Italo-Irish entrepreneur

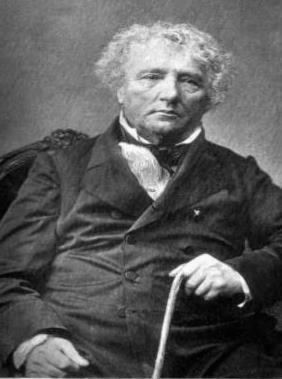
- Born: 24 September 1786; Tregolo, Costa Masnaga (near Como), Italy
- Died: 22 September 1875 (aged 88); Longfield House, Boherlahan, County Tipperary, Ireland
- Spouse: Eliza Hayes

Charles Bianconi (24 September 1786 – 22 September 1875) was an Italo-Irish entrepreneur. Sometimes described as the "man who put Ireland on wheels", he developed a network of horse-drawn coaches that became Ireland's "first regular public transport" system. He eventually became known for his innovations in transport and was twice mayor of Clonmel, in County Tipperary.

== Early life ==
Born Carlo Bianconi in Costa Masnaga, Italy on 24 September 1786, he moved from an area poised to fall to Napoleon and travelled to Ireland in 1802, via England, just four years after the 1798 rebellion. At the time, British fear of continental invasion resulted in an acute sense of insecurity and additional restrictions on the admission of foreigners. He was christened Carlo but anglicised his name to Charles when he arrived in Ireland in 1802.

== Career ==
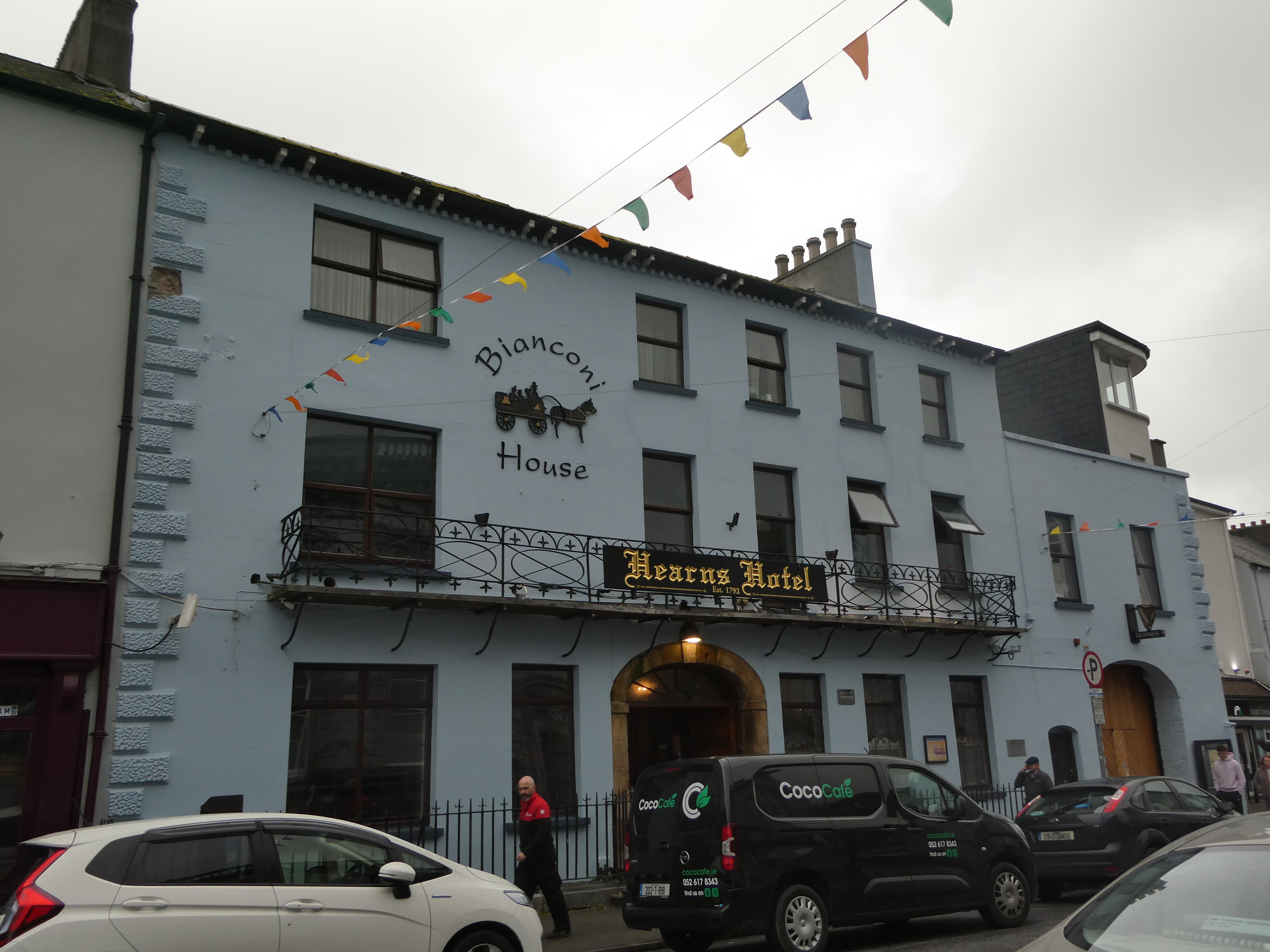
Hearns Hotel in Clonmel, now called "Bianconi House"

He worked as an engraver and printseller in Dublin, near Essex Street, under his sponsor, Andrea Faroni, when he was 16. In 1806 he set up an engraving, gilding and print shop in Carrick-on-Suir, moving to Clonmel in 1815.

Although widely regarded as the founder of public transportation in Ireland, he built on the system of mail coaches and roads that were built around Ireland before 1790 by the Scottish entrepreneur, John Anderson of Fermoy. After the collapse of Anderson's mail coach and banking empire in 1815, Bianconi established regular horse-drawn carriage services on various routes from about 1815 onwards. He acknowledged two advantages that led to his success:

I was impressed with the great want of such an establishment as I originated, and to the formation of which two circumstances mainly contributed. Firstly, the tax on carriages, by which the middle classes were precluded from using their own vehicles. Secondly, the general peace that followed the battle of Waterloo, and by which a great number of first-class horses, bred for the army, were thrown on the market with very little competition existing for their purchase. The family outside jaunting-car, thus expelled from general use by a carriage-tax, suggested itself to me as being admirably adapted for my purpose; and I was enabled to procure these vehicles on very moderate terms.

The first service, Clonmel to Cahir, took five to eight hours by boat but only two hours by Bianconi’s carriage. Travel on a ‘Bian’ cost one penny farthing a mile. His open 'Bianconi coaches' colloquially shortened to 'Bians', were a popular form of public transport for over a century.

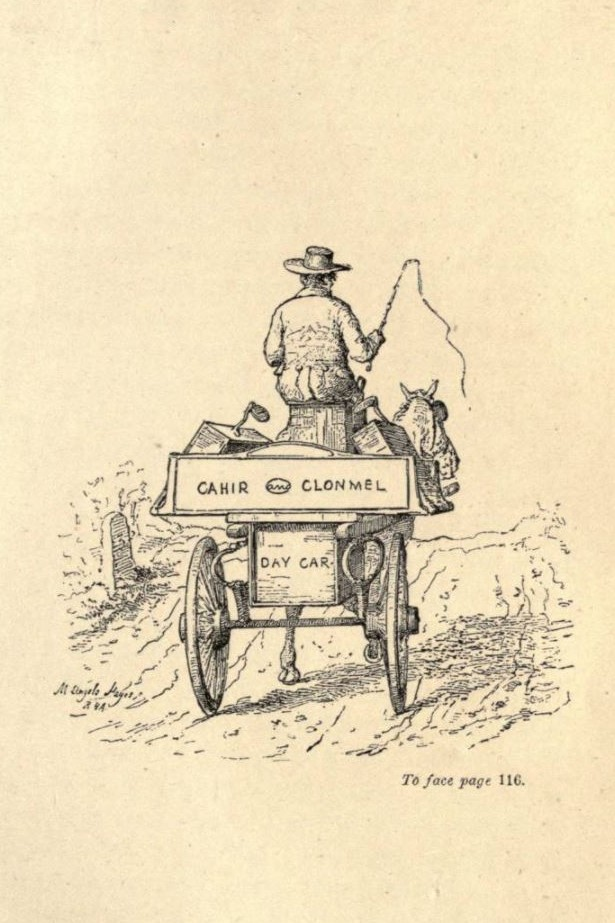
First coach adapted from a jaunting car ca 1815

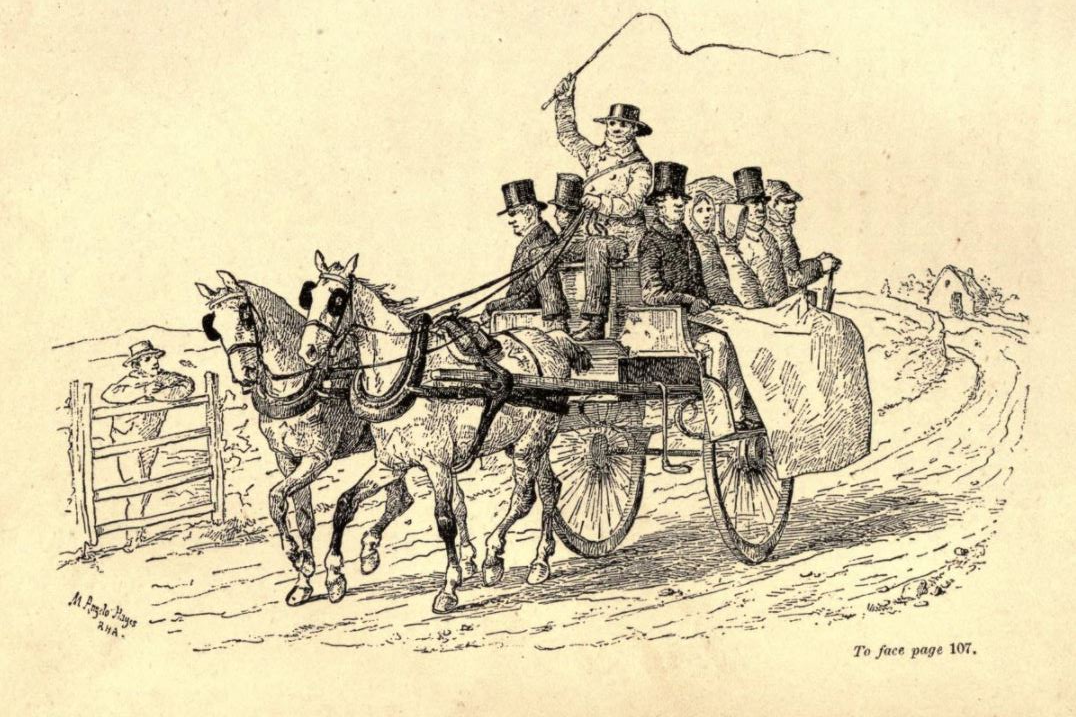
"Massey Dawson" car (8-passenger coach) ca 1830

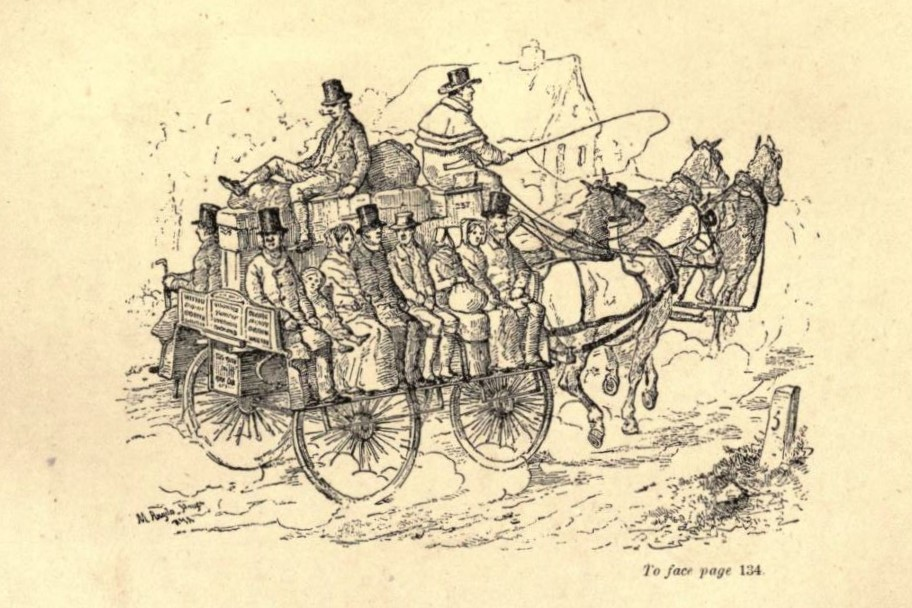
Long Bian (19-passenger coach)

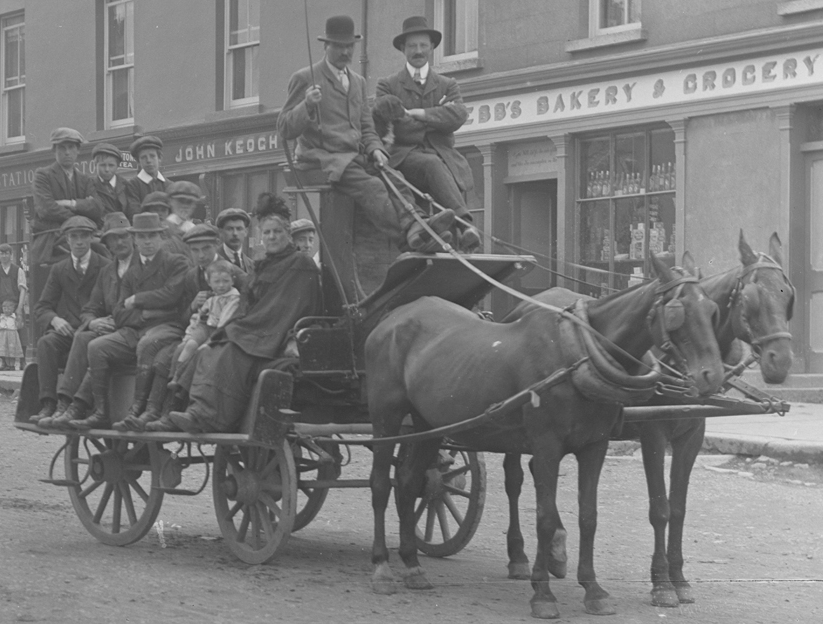
Long cars remained in use in Ireland well into the 20th century

There were also a series of inns, the Bianconi Inns, but only one still exists under the Bianconi name; in Killorglin, County Kerry. These services continued into the 1850s and later, by which time there were a number of railway services in the country. The Bianconi coaches continued to be well-patronised, by offering connections from various termini, one of the first and few examples of an integrated transport system in Ireland. By 1865 Bianconi’s annual income was about £35,000.

== Later life and death ==
Bianconi died on 22 September 1875 at Longfield House, Boherlahan, County Tipperary.

Having donated land to the parish of Boherlahan for the construction of a parish church, Bianconi wished to be buried on the church grounds. He, and his family, are buried in a side chapel, separate from the parish church in Boherlahan, approximately 5 miles from Cashel, County Tipperary.

== Family ==
In 1832 Bianconi married Eliza Hayes, the daughter of a wealthy Dublin stockbroker. They had three children - Charles Thomas Bianconi, Catherine Henrietta Bianconi and Mary Anne Bianconi the wife of Morgan John O'Connell and mother of John O'Connell Bianconi. Mary Anne published a biography of her father in 1878 which featured contributions by the artist Michael Angelo Haynes and the writer Anthony Trollope, who both knew him.
