= William Nugent Macnamara =

Irish landowner and Member of Parliament

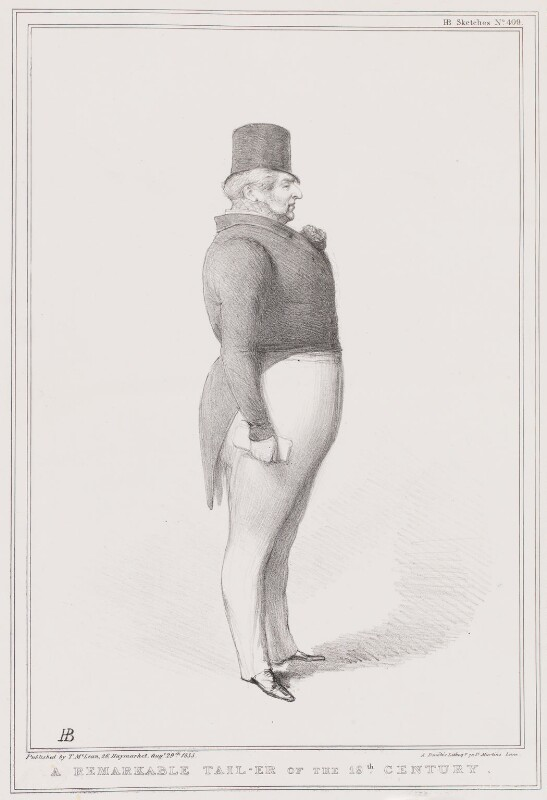
MacNamara by John "HG" Doyle, 1835

William Nugent Macnamara or M'Namara (c. 1776 – 11 November 1856) was an Irish landowner and Member of Parliament.

He was the eldest son of Irish MP Francis Macnamara of Doolin and was educated at a Dublin seminary. He entered the local militia as a captain of grenadiers, later gaining promotion to major. He was appointed High Sheriff of Clare for 1798–99, successfully keeping order during the Irish rebellion, and succeeded his father in 1815 as landlord of Doolin. He later acquired Ennistymon House by marriage into the Finucane family.

He travelled about, including to the continent, between 1814 and 1816. When in Dublin in 1815 he acted as second to Daniel O'Connell (the Liberator) in his famous duel with John D'Esterre in which O'Connell fatally wounded D'Esterre. In 1830 he was elected MP for County Clare to take the place of O'Connell, who sat instead for Waterford. He was then re-elected in 1831, 1832 and 1847, retiring in 1852.

He died in 1856 and was buried in the family vault at Doolin. He had married Susannah, daughter and co-heiress of the High Court judge Matthias Finucane of Lifford and Ann O'Brien of Ennistymon House (her parents were divorced, an unusual step for the time), with whom he had a son, Francis, and four daughters. He was succeeded by Francis, an Army officer who had been an Repeal Association MP for Ennis. Susannah died aged 39 in 1816 and is buried in St. Anne's Parish Church, Dublin, alongside their daughter Honoria (wife of Edmond John Armstrong) who died in 1838. Among his descendants was Caitlin Thomas, the author and wife of the celebrated poet Dylan Thomas.

He was described by a contemporary as "a Protestant in religion, a Catholic in politics, and a Milesian in descent".

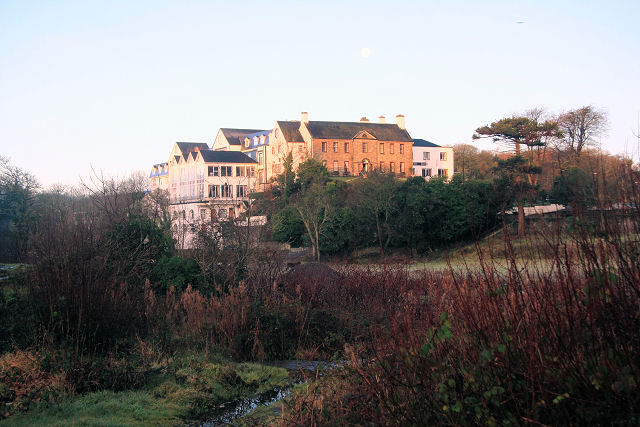
Ennistymon House, which passed to William through marriage

Parliament of the United Kingdom
Preceded by Daniel O'Connell; Lucius O'Brien	Member of Parliament for County Clare; 1830 – 1852; With: James Patrick Mahon 1830–31; Maurice O'Connell 1831–32; Cornelius O'Brien 1832–47; Sir Lucius O'Brien 1847–52	Succeeded by Sir John Forster FitzGerald; Cornelius O'Brien
