= Cornelius O'Brien (County Clare) =

Irish politician and landowner (1782–1857)

Cornelius O'Brien (1782–1857) was an Irish politician, Member of Parliament and landowner in County Clare.

He was the son of Henry O'Brien from Ennis and his wife Helen (née O'Callaghan). Born at the O'Brien residence at Birchfield House in Beaghy townland of Kilmacrehy parish, now demolished and replaced by a farm house. It was a house designed in the exotic "Moorish" or "Foreign Legion" style.

Cornelius O'Brien was married firstly in 1816 to Margaret, the daughter of Peter Long of Waterford. She was the widow of James O'Brien of Limerick. His second wife was Ellen McLaughlin daughter of Hugh McLaughlin, merchant of Ennis. They married in July 1836 in Limerick. Cornelius was a solicitor (from 1811) and later also magistrate for Clare.

Cornelius (or Corney) became MP for County Clare in 1832. He was a Liberal in favour of Repeal of the Union and was reelected (with a break from 1847 to 1852) until his death in 1857.

His other residences besides Birchfield were at 4 North Street, Westminster, London and 20 Summerhill, Dublin.

He built a tower, now referred to as O'Brien's Tower on the Cliffs of Moher in 1835 as an observation tower for the hundreds of tourists that frequented the cliffs during the time.

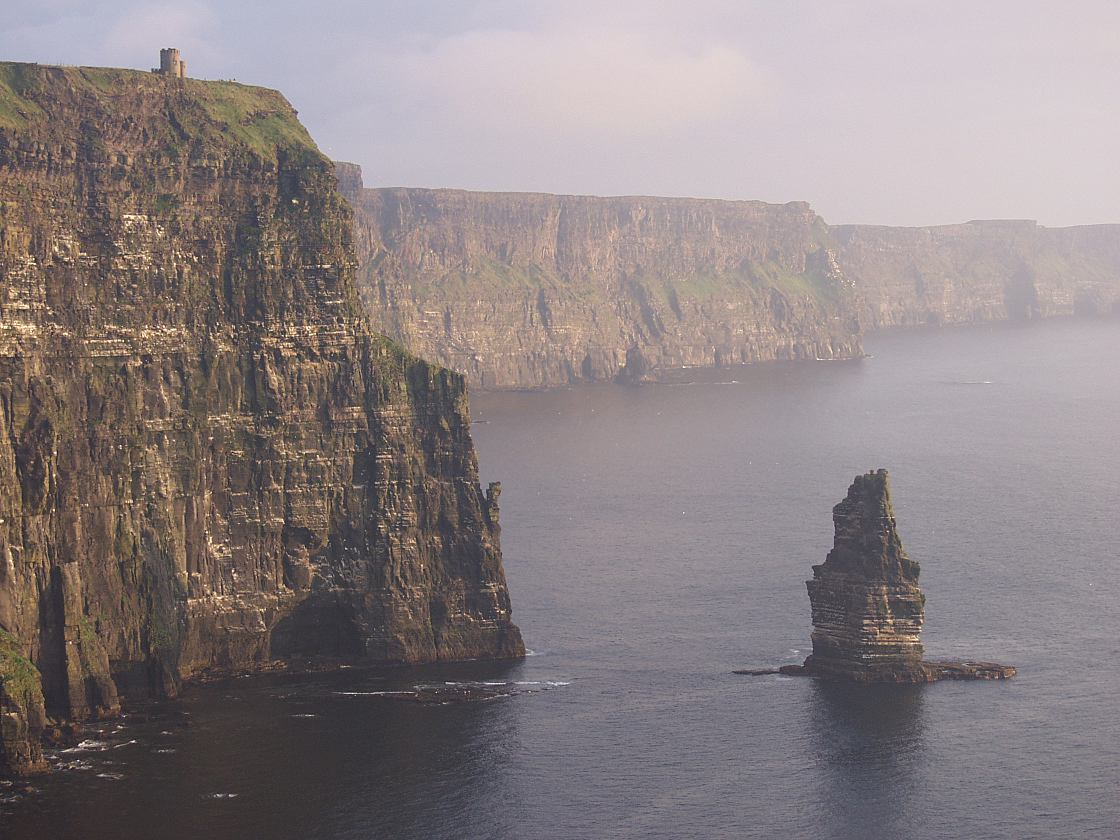
O'Brien's Tower is just visible in this panoramic view of the Cliffs of Moher.

Folklore holds that Cornelius O'Brien was a man ahead of his time, believing that the development of tourism would benefit the local economy and bring people out of poverty. O'Brien also built St. Brigid's National School (1846) and a wall of Moher flagstones along the Cliffs. It is said in the locality that he "built everything around here except the Cliffs". He died in 1857 and his remains lie in the O'Brien vault in the graveyard adjoining Liscannor's St Brigid's Well.

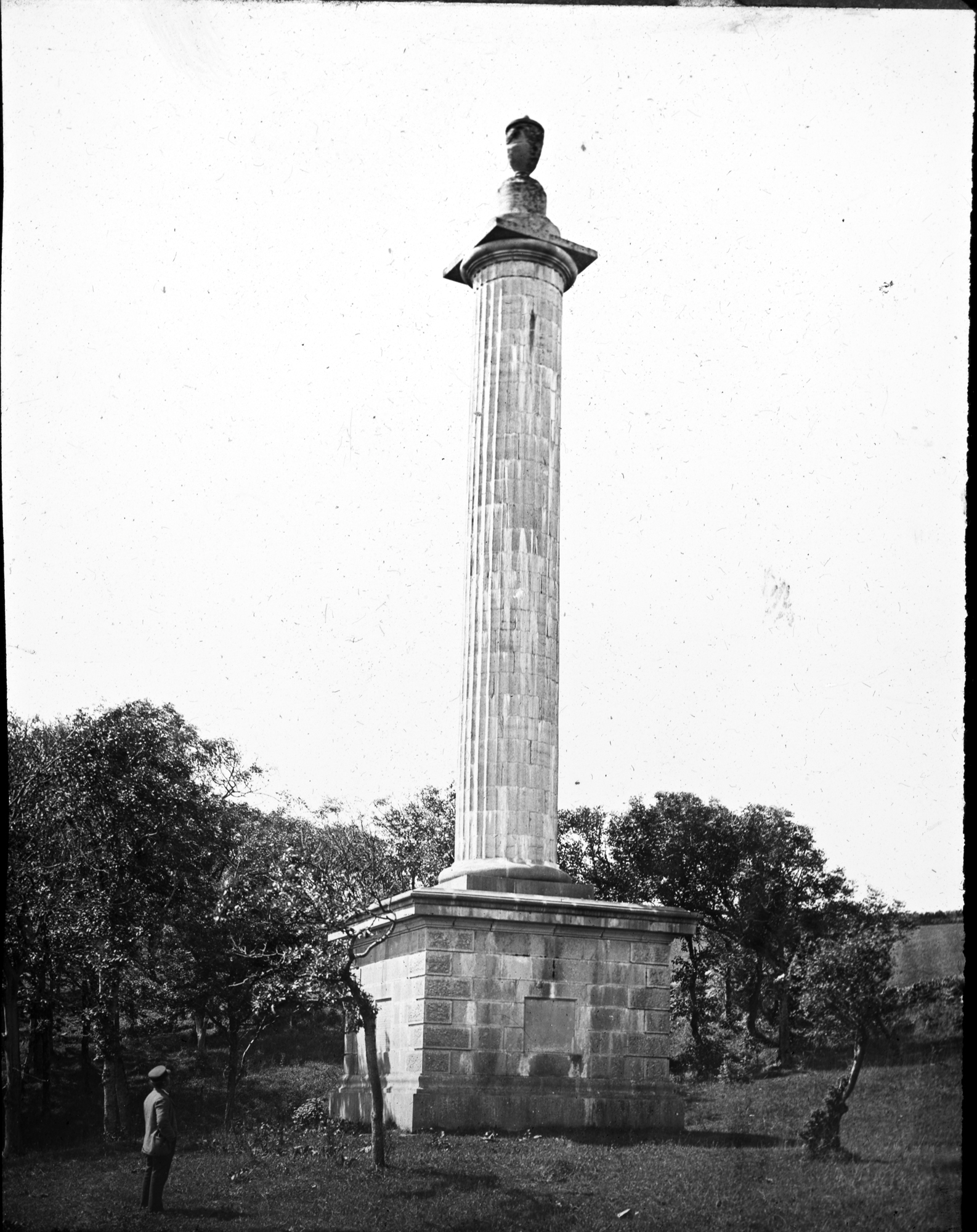
O'Brien Monument

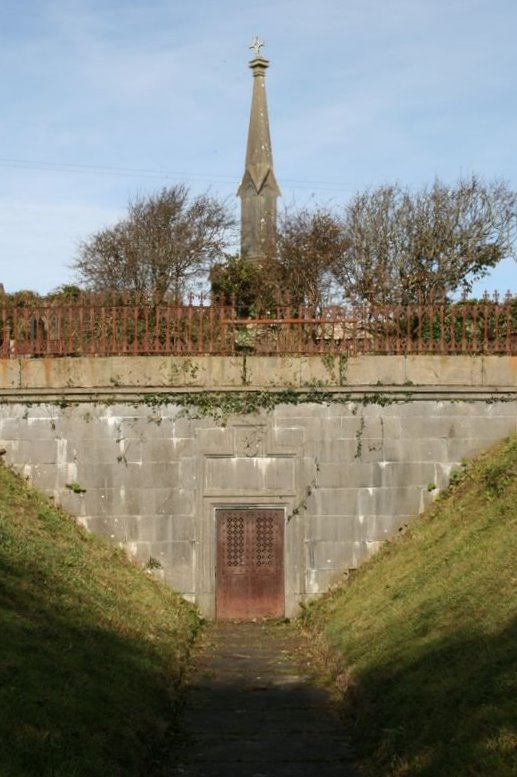
The O'Brien vault

The O'Brien Monument, a Doric column topped by an urn, was built during his lifetime, paid for by compulsory subscriptions of his tenants.

Parliament of the United Kingdom
Preceded by Maurice O'Connell; William Nugent Macnamara	Member of Parliament for County Clare; 1832–1847; With: William Nugent Macnamara	Succeeded by Sir Lucius O'Brien, Bt; William Nugent Macnamara
Preceded by Sir Lucius O'Brien; William Nugent Macnamara	Member of Parliament for County Clare; 1852 – 1857; With: Sir John Forster FitzGerald	Succeeded by Lord Francis Conyngham; Francis Macnamara Calcutt
