= Crofton Moore Vandeleur =

Irish politician (1809–1881)

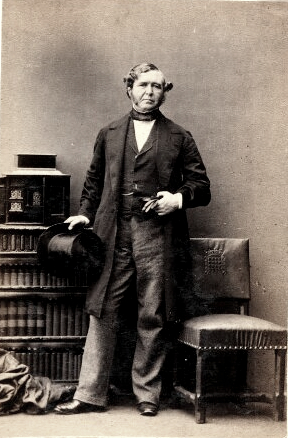

Member of Parliament for County Clare
- In office 1859–1874 Serving with Luke White, Francis Macnamara Calcutt, Sir Colman O'Loghlen, Bt
- Preceded by: Lord Francis Conyngham; Francis Macnamara Calcutt
- Succeeded by: Sir Colman O'Loghlen, Bt; Lord Francis Conyngham

Personal details
- Born: 1809
- Died: 8 November 1881 (aged 71–72)
- Relations: Charles Moore, 1st Marquess of Drogheda (grandfather)
- Parent(s): John Ormsby Vandeleur; Lady Frances Moore
- Education: Harrow School; Trinity College, Cambridge

Colonel Crofton Moore Vandeleur (1809 – 8 November 1881) was an Irish landowner and Conservative Party politician from Kilrush in County Clare. He sat in the House of Commons of the United Kingdom from 1859 to 1874 as a Member of Parliament (MP) for County Clare.

== Early life ==
He was the oldest son of John Ormsby Vandeleur of Kilrush, who had been an MP in both the pre-union Parliament of Ireland and then in the union parliament. His mother was Lady Frances Moore, daughter of Charles Moore, 1st Marquess of Drogheda, and Lady Anne Seymour-Conway.

The Vandeleur family were of Dutch origin. They were initially based at Ralahine in Sixmilebridge, by James Vandeleur in the late 1630s, and were compensated by the Cromwellians for losses during the 1641 rebellion. Their holdings were confirmed by Charles II. They arrived in Kilrush in 1688, and prospered.

Vandeleur was educated at Harrow and at Trinity College, Cambridge.

== Career ==
In 1828, he succeeded to his father's extensive estates, which by the middle of the century included almost 20,000 acres in County Clare, mostly in the barony of Moyarta. At the time of Griffith's Valuation in 1868, they held at least 17 townlands in the parish of Kilrush, where his father had built Kilrush House in 1808. The Vandeleurs effectively owned the town, which John had set about developing. His efforts were continued during the 19th century by Crofton and Crofton's son Hector Vandeleur. However, their lack of compassion during the Great Famine and later their bad record as absentee landlords, left a legacy of hostility to the family, exacerbated by widespread evictions in the 1880s.

Vandeleur became a magistrate for County Clare, and a Deputy Lieutenant of the county. He was High Sheriff of County Clare in 1832, and in 1843 he became Colonel of the Clare Militia.

He stood unsuccessfully in the County Clare constituency at the 1835, 1841 and 1852 general elections. He won a seat on his fourth attempt, at the 1859 general election, and held it until 1874.

== Personal life ==
In 1862 he married Lady Grace Graham-Toler, second daughter of the 2nd Earl of Norbury.

Vandeleur died on 8 November 1881. He was succeeded in his estates by his oldest son Hector Vandeleur. Kilrush House burned down near the end of the century, and the Vandeleurs gradually severed their connection with the town. His descendants included two distinguished soldiers who served in World War II, Joe Vandeleur and Giles Vandeleur.

Parliament of the United Kingdom
Preceded by Lord Francis Conyngham; Francis Macnamara Calcutt	Member of Parliament for County Clare; 1859–1874; With: Luke White 1859–1860; Francis Macnamara Calcutt 1860–1863; Sir Colman O'Loghlen, Bt from 1863	Succeeded by Sir Colman O'Loghlen, Bt; Lord Francis Conyngham
