= John Forster FitzGerald =

Irish officer of the British Army

Field Marshal Sir John FitzGerald GCB
- Born: c. 1785; County Clare, Ireland
- Died: 24 March 1877 (aged 92 or 93); Tours, France
- Burial place: Tours, France
- Military career
- Allegiance: United Kingdom
- Branch: British Army
- Service years: 1793–1841
- Rank: Field Marshal
- Commands: 20th Regiment of Foot; Divisional command in the Madras Army; Divisional command in the Bombay Army
- Conflicts: French Revolutionary Wars; Napoleonic Wars; Peninsular War; Siege of Badajoz (WIA); Battle of Salamanca; Battle of Vitoria; Battle of the Pyrenees (POW)
- Awards: Army Gold Cross

Field Marshal Sir John Forster FitzGerald, GCB (c. 1785 – 24 March 1877) was a soldier from Ireland who served as an officer in the British Army. He fought in the Peninsular War, seeing action at the Battle of Badajoz, the Battle of Salamanca and the Battle of Vitoria and commanding a brigade during the Battle of the Pyrenees before being captured by the French Army. He became Commandant of Quebec and then went on to be Commandant of Montreal, Quebec. He was given command of the 20th Regiment of Foot in Bombay before being given a divisional command in the Madras Army but shortly afterwards transferring to Bombay where he was given a divisional command of the Bombay Army. He later became a Whig Member of Parliament.

== Career ==
Born the son of Edward FitzGerald and his second wife, a daughter of Major Thomas Burton, FitzGerald was commissioned as an ensign in Captain Shee's independent company of foot, then based in Ireland, on 29 October 1793. Promoted to lieutenant in January 1794, he transferred to the 46th Regiment of Foot with the rank of captain on 31 October 1800. He subsequently transferred to the newly formed New Brunswick Fencibles on 9 July 1803 and was promoted to brevet major on 25 September 1803. After exchanging into the 60th Royal Americans with the substantive rank of major in 1809, he was promoted to lieutenant colonel on 25 July 1810.

FitzGerald fought in the Peninsular War, seeing action at the Battle of Badajoz in March 1812, the Battle of Salamanca in July 1812 and the Battle of Vitoria in June 1813. He commanded a brigade during the Battle of the Pyrenees in July 1813 and was captured by the French Army but was released at the end of the War. He was appointed a Companion of the Order of the Bath on 2 January 1815.

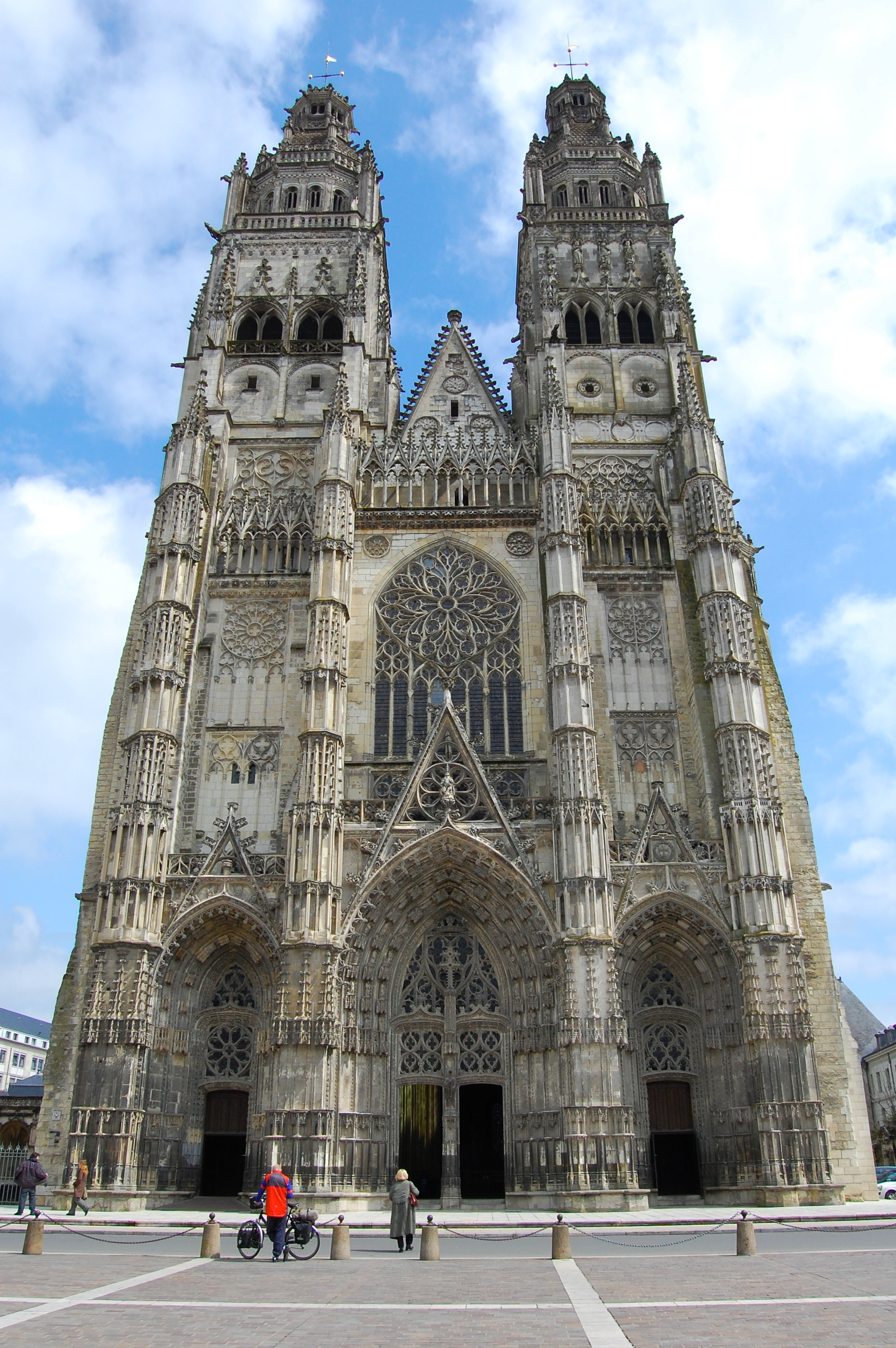
Tours Cathedral which, on FitzGerald's death, was the scene of a funeral with the full military honours normally prescribed for a marshal of France

After remaining with his regiment in Ireland for two years, FitzGerald was sent to Gibraltar in 1816 and to Canada in 1818. He became Commandant of Quebec in 1818 and, having been promoted to brevet colonel on 12 August 1819, he went on to be Commandant of Montreal, Quebec. He was given command of the 20th Regiment of Foot in Bombay on 5 February 1824 before being promoted to major-general on 22 July 1830 and being advanced to Knight Commander of the Order of the Bath on 13 September 1831. He was given a divisional command in the Madras Army in 1838 and but shortly afterwards transferred to Bombay where he was given a divisional command of the Bombay Army. Returning to the United Kingdom in early 1841, he was promoted to lieutenant-general on 23 November 1841 and to full general on 20 June 1854.

FitzGerald was also colonel of the 85th Regiment of Foot (Bucks Volunteers), of the 62nd (Wiltshire) Regiment of Foot and then of the Royal Irish Regiment. He represented County Clare in Parliament on behalf of the Whig Party from 1852 to 1857. He was advanced to Knight Grand Cross of the Order of the Bath on 19 November 1862 and promoted to field marshal on 29 May 1875. Having retired to France, FitzGerald decided, at an advanced age, to become a convert to the Catholic Church. He died at Tours in France on 24 March 1877; on the orders of Jean Auguste Berthaut, the French Minister of War, the garrison of Tours gave FitzGerald a funeral with the full military honours normally prescribed for a marshal of France. He was buried in St Symphorien cemetery in Tours.

== Family ==
In 1805 FitzGerald married Charlotte Hazen; their children included:

- Charlotte FitzGerald (1805–1853) who married Baron von Ende
- Anne FitzGerald (c.1808-1882) who married Sir Robert Keith Arbuthnot, 2nd Baronet
- Captain John Forster FitzGerald (1820–1848)

Following the death of his first wife, FitzGerald married Jean Ogilvy in 1839; they had children, including William Walter Augustine Fitzgerald but no further details are recorded.

== Sources ==
- Heathcote, Tony (1999). The British Field Marshals, 1736–1997: A Biographical Dictionary. Barnsley: Leo Cooper. ISBN 0-85052-696-5.

Military offices
Preceded by Sir William Thornton	Colonel of the 85th, or The King's; Regiment of Light Infantry (Bucks Volunteers); 4 April 1840	Succeeded by Sir Thomas Pearson
Preceded by Sir Archibald Campbell	Colonel of the 62nd (Wiltshire) Regiment of Foot; 21 Nov 1843	Succeeded by Sir James Fergusson
Preceded by Lord Aylmer	Colonel of the Royal Irish Regiment; 9 March 1850	Succeeded by Clement Edwards
Parliament of the United Kingdom
Preceded by William Nugent Macnamara and Sir Lucius O'Brien	Member of Parliament for County Clare; 1852–1857; With: Cornelius O'Brien	Succeeded by Lord Francis Nathaniel Conyngham and Francis Macnamara Calcutt
