= Tralee (UK Parliament constituency) =

UK parliamentary constituency in Ireland, 1801–1885

- Former borough constituency for the House of Commons
- County: County Kerry
- Borough: Tralee

1801–1885
- Seats: 1
- Created from: Tralee (IHC)
- Replaced by: West Kerry

Tralee is a former borough constituency in the Parliament of the United Kingdom, returning one Member of Parliament (MP) for the parliamentary borough of Tralee, County Kerry, Ireland from 1801 to 1885.

== History ==
Tralee was a two-seat constituency in the Irish House of Commons. Under the Acts of Union 1800, which came into effect on 1 January 1801, it was one of the constituencies represented in the House of Commons of the United Kingdom, with its representation reduced to one seat. The member who sat in the First Parliament of the United Kingdom was chosen by lot. The borough was disfranchised under the Redistribution of Seats Act 1885, which took effect at the 1885 general election. The area was thereafter represented by the county constituency of West Kerry.

Notable MPs included George Canning, later Prime Minister in 1827, Arthur Wellesley, later Prime Minister from 1828 to 1830 (as the Duke of Wellington), and Thomas O'Hagan, later Lord Chancellor of Ireland from 1868 to 1874 and 1880 to 1881.

== Boundaries ==
This constituency was the parliamentary borough of Tralee in County Kerry. In December 1831, commissioners proposed boundaries for the borough. The Parliamentary Boundaries (Ireland) Act 1832 defined the boundaries of the parliamentary borough as:

From the Milestone on the Killarney Road opposite a Lane which runs Eastward therefrom, in a straight Line to the South-eastern Angle of the Garden Wall of a House which is situate at the South-western Corner of the Barrack Wall; thence, Westward, along the said Garden Wall to the Point at which the same meets another Wall which runs Westward to the End of Mr. Benners Brewery; thence, Westward, along the last-mentioned Wall to the Brewery; thence along the Southern Side of the Brewery to the Mill Race which is beyond it; thence, Northward, along the Mill Race to the Point at which the same meets the Road which leads from the Brewery to Miltown; thence, Westward, along the last-mentioned Road to the Point at which the same meets the Ballymullen River; thence, Northward, along the Ballymullen River to the Point at which the same meets the Miltown Road; thence in a straight Line to a Point on the Blennerville Road which is distant Four hundred and forty Yards (measured along the Blennerville Road) to the North of the Point at which the Spa Road leaves the same; thence in a straight Line to a Point on the Spa Road which is distant Three hundred and seventy-five Yards (measured along the Spa Road) to the North of the Point at which the same leaves the Blennerville Road; thence in a straight Line to the northernmost Point at which the new Listowell Road is met by a small Stream which runs alongside thereof from a Pond towards the Town; thence in a straight Line to the Point at which the old Listowell Road is joined by the Road which leads to Mr. Batemans Demesne; thence along the old Listowell Road to the Bridge on the same over the Canal; thence in a straight Line to the Milestone first described.

== Members of Parliament ==
Election	Member	Party	Note
1801-01-01	Arthur Moore		
1802-07-24	Rt Hon. George Canning	Tory	Appointed Treasurer of the Navy
1804-06-04	Rt Hon. George Canning	Tory	
1806-11-17	Rt Hon. Maurice FitzGerald (The 18th Knight of Kerry)	Whig	Also returned by and elected to sit for County Kerry
1807-01-17	Samuel Boddington	Tory	
1807-05-21	Sir Arthur Wellesley	Tory	Also returned by and elected to sit for Newport (Isle of Wight)
1807-07-27	Evan Foulkes	Tory	Resigned
1808-02-25	James Stephen	Tory	
1812-10-27	Henry Arthur Herbert	Whig	Resigned
1813-06-17	James Evan Baillie	Whig	
1818-06-29	Edward Denny	Tory	Later 4th Baronet. Resigned.
1819-05-29	James Cuffe	Tory	Died 29 July 1828
1820-03-20	James Cuffe	Tory	Died 29 July 1828
1826	James Cuffe	Tory	Died 29 July 1828
1828-09-12	Sir Edward Denny, Bt	Tory	3rd Baronet. Resigned.
1829-06-09	Robert Vernon Smith	Whig	
1831-05-07	Walker Ferrand	Tory	
1832-12-14	Maurice O'Connell	Repeal	
1837-08-07	John Bateman	Conservative	Unseated on petition
1838-03-12	Maurice O'Connell	Repeal	
1852-07-15	Maurice O'Connell	Radical	Died 18 June 1853
1853-07-04	Daniel O'Connell Jnr	Whig	
1859-05-02	Daniel O'Connell Jnr	Liberal	Resigned
1863-05-15	Rt Hon. Thomas O'Hagan	Liberal	Appointed Judge of the Court of Common Pleas in Ireland
1865-02-14	Daniel O'Donoghue (The O'Donoghue)	Liberal	
1880-04-01	Daniel O'Donoghue (The O'Donoghue)	Home Rule	
1885-11-18	Constituency abolished		

== Elections ==
=== Elections in the 1830s ===
General election 1830: Tralee
Party	Candidate	Votes	%
Whig	Robert Vernon Smith	Unopposed	
Registered electors		13	
Whig gain from Tory			

Vernon Smith was appointed as a Commissioner of the Treasury, requiring a by-election.

By-election, 4 December 1830: Tralee
Party	Candidate	Votes	%
Whig	Robert Vernon Smith	Unopposed	
Registered electors		13	
Whig hold			

General election 1831: Tralee
Party	Candidate	Votes	%
Tory	Walker Ferrand	Unopposed	
Registered electors		13	
Tory gain from Whig			

General election 1832: Tralee
Party	Candidate	Votes	%
Repeal	Maurice O'Connell	91	56.2
Tory	Edward Denny, Jnr.	71	43.8
Majority		20	12.4
Turnout		162	90.0
Registered electors		180	
Repeal gain from Tory			

General election 1835: Tralee
Party	Candidate	Votes	%	±%
Repeal (Whig)	Maurice O'Connell	85	51.2	−5.0
Conservative	William Denny	81	48.8	+5.0
Majority		4	2.4	−10.0
Turnout		166	63.1	−26.9
Registered electors		263		
Repeal hold		Swing	−5.0	

General election 1837: Tralee
Party	Candidate	Votes	%	±%
Conservative	John Bateman (Tralee MP)	75	54.0	+5.2
Repeal (Whig)	Maurice O'Connell	64	46.0	−5.2
Majority		11	8.0	N/A
Turnout		139	33.6	−29.5
Registered electors		414		
Conservative gain from Repeal		Swing	+5.2	

- On petition, tendered votes were allowed, altering total votes to 133 for O'Connell and 111 for Bateman, allowing O'Connell to be declared elected.

=== Elections in the 1840s ===
General election 1841: Tralee
Party	Candidate	Votes	%	±%
Repeal	Maurice O'Connell	Unopposed		
Registered electors		258		
Repeal gain from Conservative				

General election 1847: Tralee
Party	Candidate	Votes	%	±%
Repeal	Maurice O'Connell	Unopposed		
Registered electors		511		
Repeal hold				

=== Elections in the 1850s ===
General election 1852: Tralee
Party	Candidate	Votes	%	±%
Radical	Maurice O'Connell	103	81.1	N/A
Conservative	William Denny	24	18.9	New
Conservative	George Herbert Kinderley	0	0.0	New
Majority		79	62.2	N/A
Turnout		127	55.7	N/A
Registered electors		228		
Radical gain from Repeal		Swing	N/A	

O'Connell's death caused a by-election.

By-election, 4 July 1853: Tralee
Party	Candidate	Votes	%	±%
Whig	Daniel O'Connell Jnr	150	93.8	N/A
Independent Irish	Thomas Fitzgerald	10	6.3	New
Majority		140	87.5	N/A
Turnout		160	50.8	−4.9
Registered electors		315		
Whig gain from Radical		Swing		

General election 1857: Tralee
Party	Candidate	Votes	%	±%
Whig	Daniel O'Connell Jnr	Unopposed		
Registered electors		248		
Whig gain from Radical				

General election 1859: Tralee
Party	Candidate	Votes	%	±%
Liberal	Daniel O'Connell Jnr	Unopposed		
Registered electors		244		
Liberal hold				

=== Elections in the 1860s ===
O'Connell resigned, causing a by-election.

By-election, 15 May 1863: Tralee
Party	Candidate	Votes	%	±%
Liberal	Thomas O'Hagan	Unopposed		
Registered electors		238		
Liberal hold				

O'Hagan resigned after being appointed a Judge of the Court of Common Pleas, causing a by-election.

By-election, 14 February 1865: Tralee
Party	Candidate	Votes	%	±%
Liberal	Daniel O'Donoghue	115	59.3	N/A
Liberal	Joseph Neale McKenna	79	40.7	N/A
Majority		36	18.6	N/A
Turnout		194	81.5	N/A
Registered electors		238		
Liberal hold		Swing	N/A	

General election 1865: Tralee
Party	Candidate	Votes	%	±%
Liberal	Daniel O'Donoghue	Unopposed		
Registered electors		238		
Liberal hold				

General election 1868: Tralee
Party	Candidate	Votes	%	±%
Liberal	Daniel O'Donoghue	Unopposed		
Registered electors		263		
Liberal hold				

=== Elections in the 1870s ===
General election 1874: Tralee
Party	Candidate	Votes	%	±%
Liberal	Daniel O'Donoghue	143	50.5	N/A
Home Rule	John Daly	140	49.5	New
Majority		3	1.0	N/A
Turnout		283	77.3	N/A
Registered electors		366		
Liberal hold		Swing	N/A	

=== Elections in the 1880s ===
General election 1880: Tralee
Party	Candidate	Votes	%	±%
Home Rule	Daniel O'Donoghue	187	58.4	+8.9
Conservative	Samuel Murray Hussey	133	41.6	New
Majority		54	16.8	N/A
Turnout		320	90.1	+12.8
Registered electors		355		
Home Rule gain from Liberal		Swing		

== See also ==
- Wikipedia:WikiProject UK Parliament constituencies/Historic constituency names
