= Bryan O'Loghlen =

Australian politician (1828-1905)

Sir Bryan O'Loghlen Bt
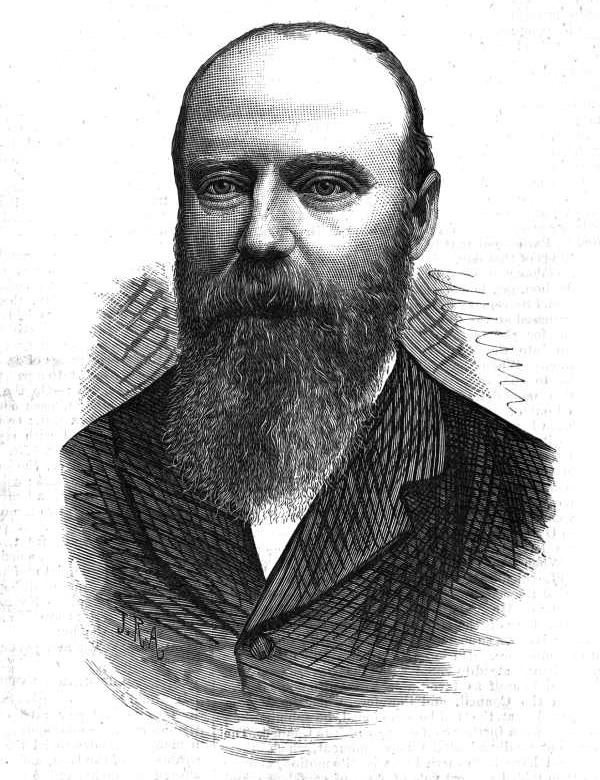

13th Premier of Victoria
- In office 9 July 1881 – 8 March 1883
- Preceded by: Graham Berry
- Succeeded by: James Service

Personal details
- Born: 27 June 1828 Dublin, Ireland
- Died: 31 October 1905 (aged 77) St Kilda, Victoria, Australia
- Resting place: St Kilda Cemetery
- Spouse: Ella

Sir Bryan O'Loghlen, 3rd Baronet (pronounced and sometimes spelt Brian O'Lochlen; 27 June 1828 – 31 October 1905) was an Irish-born Australian colonial politician who was the 13th Premier of Victoria.

== Early life ==
O'Loghlen was born in County Clare, Ireland on 27 June 1828. He was a younger son of the distinguished Irish judge Sir Michael O'Loghlen, 1st Baronet, and his wife Bidelia Kelly, and was educated at Trinity College Dublin and was admitted to the Irish Bar in 1856.

== Career ==
In 1862 he emigrated to Victoria and was appointed a Crown Prosecutor in 1863. He succeeded to his father's baronetcy in 1877 on the death of his brother, Colman, and in the same year he was elected, in absentia, to the British House of Commons for County Clare, replacing his brother, but did not take his seat.

O'Loghlen narrowly lost the election for the seat of North Melbourne in May 1877. In February 1878 O'Loghlen, a recognised leader of the Irish Catholic community in Victoria, was elected to the Victorian Legislative Assembly for West Melbourne in a by-election. In 1880 he transferred to West Bourke, which he held until February 1883.

O'Loghlen was a radical liberal in Victorian politics: he favoured breaking up the estates of the landowning class (who were mainly English and Scottish Protestants) to provide land for small farmers, and ending the power of the landowner-dominated Victorian Legislative Council.

He also wanted government aid for Catholic schools, but not if this meant government supervision of what they taught. He served as Attorney-General in the reforming ministry of Graham Berry from 27 March 1878 to 1880, and was a loyal supporter of Berry in his struggles with the Council and the conservatives it represented. His appointment as Attorney-General constituted an office of profit from the Crown; in Victoria he won the consequent ministerial by-election, whereas in the UK a select committee deemed he had vacated his Westminster seat, triggering a by-election.

=== Premier of Victoria ===
When Berry's third government resigned in July 1881, O'Loghlen succeeded him as leader of the liberal forces and became Premier—the second Irish Catholic to hold the position. His government was described as "unspectacular", and "a collection of party rebels, Catholics and opportunists". Much of the radical impetus of the Berry years had passed and O'Loghlen's government achieved little. In 1883, a scandal arose over the activities of Railways Minister Thomas Bent, who was accused of corruption. In the March 1883 election, the liberals were defeated and O'Loghlen lost his seat.

In 1888, O'Loghlen returned to politics as member for Belfast, which he held until 1889, when the seat was renamed Port Fairy, which he represented from 1889 to 1894, and again from 1897 to 1900. He was Attorney-General again, albeit only for one year, in the Patterson government (1893–1894).

== Personal life ==
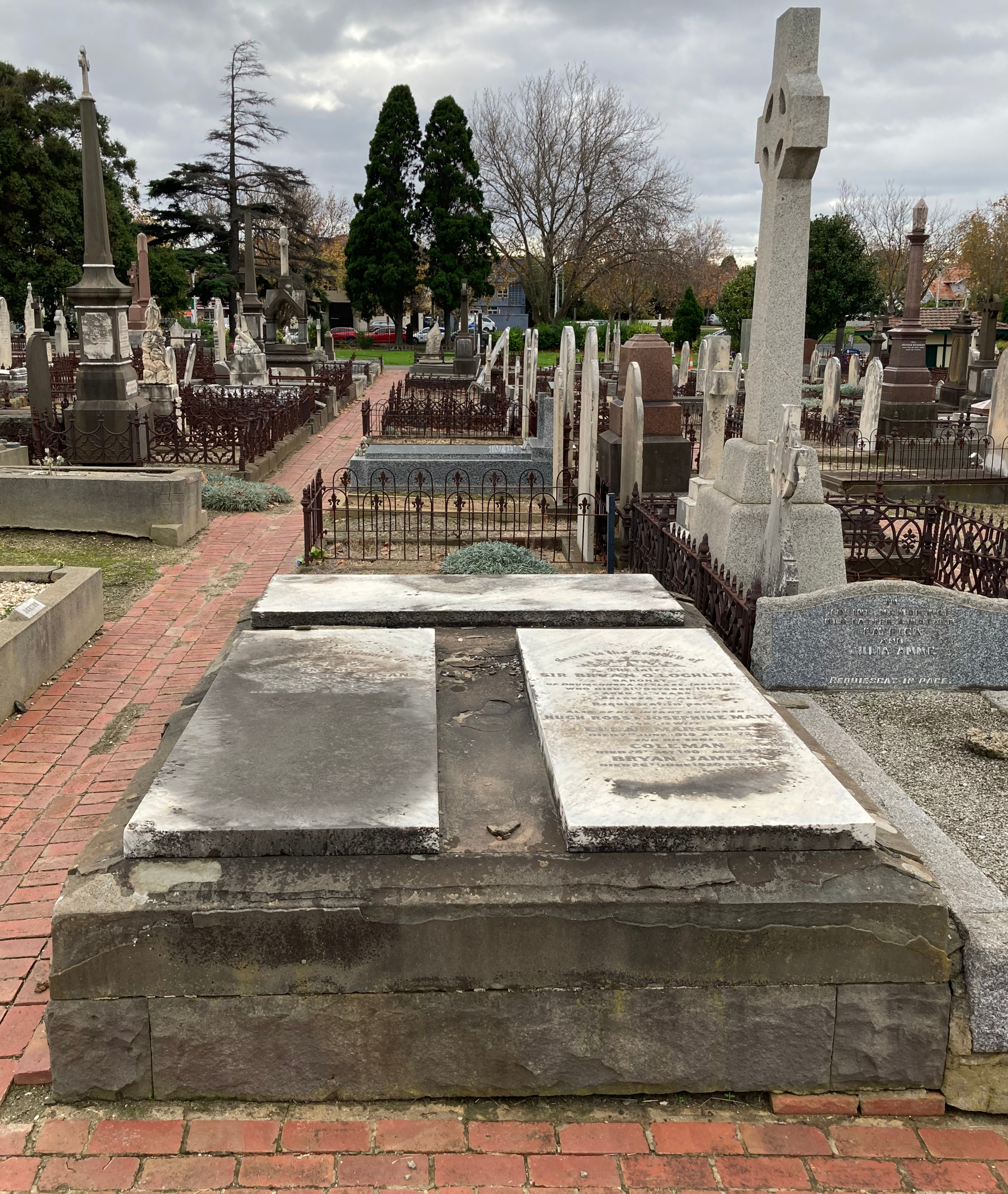
O'Loghlen's grave at St Kilda Cemetery

O'Loghlen was married to Ella Margaret Seward (1846–1919). Together, they were the parents of twelve children, including:

- Sir Michael O'Loghlen, 4th Baronet (1866–1934), who married Beatrice Mary Murphy in 1918.
- Lucy Mary Susan O'Loghlen (1868–1942)
- Colman Seward O'Loghlen (1870–1909)
- Hugh Ross O'Loghlen (1873–1873), who died young.
- Ella Maud O'Loghlen Williams (1874–1960)
- Bryan James O'Loghlen (1878–1920)
- Josephine Mary O'Loghlen (1880–1880), who died young.
- Charles Hugh Ross O'Loghlen (1881–1951)
- Henry Ross O'Loghlen (1886–1944), who married Doris Irene Horne in 1912.
- Aimee Margaret O'Loghlen (1891–1954)

He died aged 77 in 1905, and was buried at St Kilda Cemetery. He was succeeded in the barony by his eldest son, Michael.

Parliament of the United Kingdom
Preceded by Sir Colman O'Loghlen; Lord Francis Conyngham	Member of Parliament for County Clare; 1877–1879; With: Lord Francis Conyngham	Succeeded by Lord Francis Conyngham; James Patrick O'Gorman Mahon
Baronetage of the United Kingdom
Preceded by Colman Michael O'Loghlen	Baronet (of Drumcanora); 1877–1905	Succeeded by Michael O'Loghlen
Victorian Legislative Assembly
Preceded by Sir Charles MacMahon	Member for West Melbourne; 1878–1880	Succeeded by James Orkney
Preceded by Robert Harper; Samuel Staughton Sr.	Member for West Bourke; 1880–1883; With: Alfred Deakin	Succeeded by Alfred Deakin; Samuel Staughton Sr.
Preceded by John Madden	Member for Belfast; 1888–1889	Seat abolished
Seat created	Member for Port Fairy; 1889–1894	Succeeded by James Duffus
Preceded by James Duffus	Member for Port Fairy; 1897–1900	Succeeded by James Duffus
Political offices
Preceded by Graham Berry	Premier of Victoria; 1881–1883	Succeeded by James Service
