= James Patrick Mahon =

Irish nationalist journalist, barrister, parliamentarian and mercenary

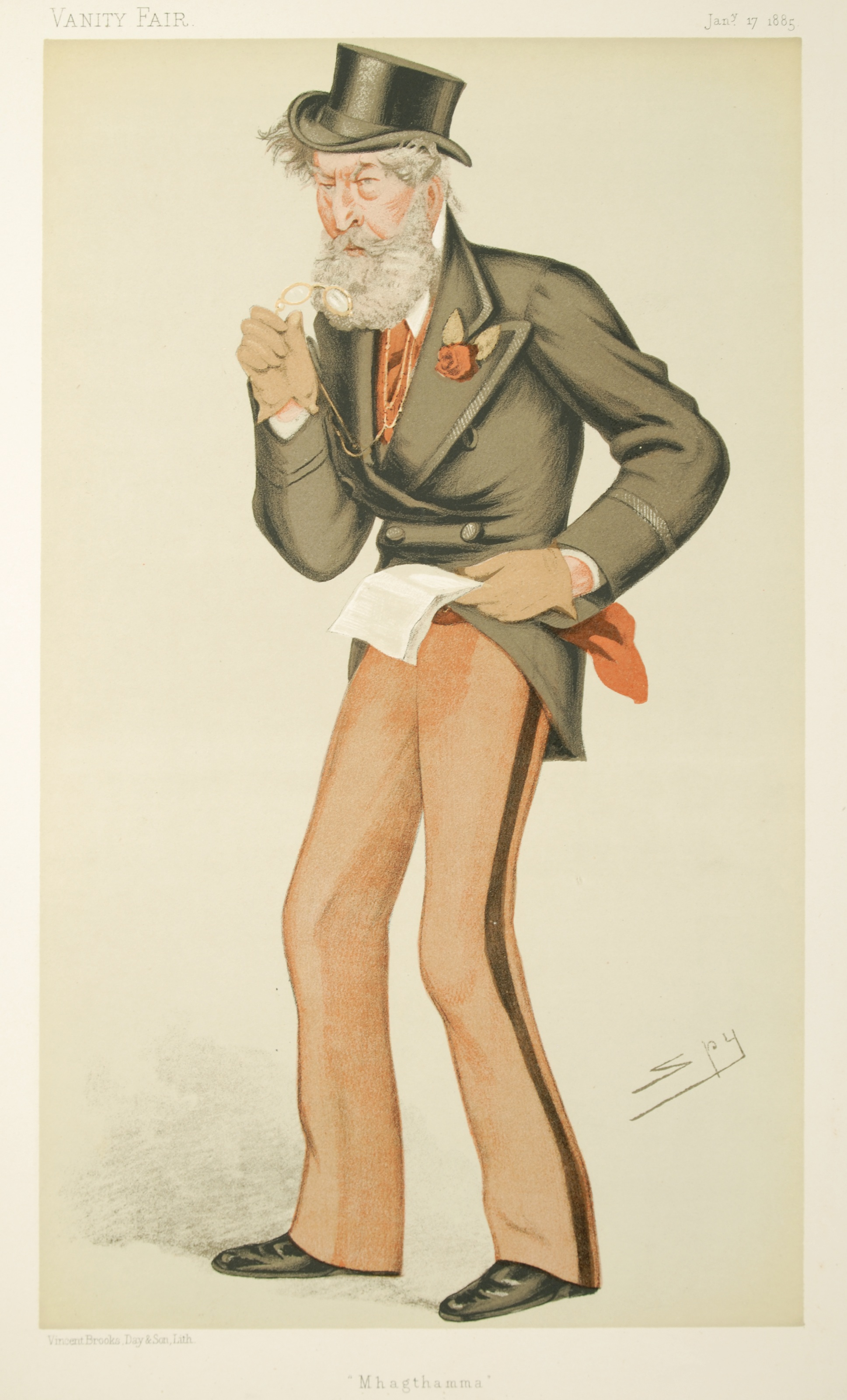
- Caricature by Spy published in Vanity Fair in 1885.

Member of Parliament for County Clare
- In office 1830–1830 Serving with William Nugent Macnamara
- Preceded by: Daniel O'Connell; Lucius O'Brien
- Succeeded by: William Nugent Macnamara; Maurice O'Connell

Member of Parliament for Ennis
- In office 1847–1852
- Preceded by: Hewitt Bridgeman
- Succeeded by: John David Fitzgerald

Member of Parliament for Clare
- In office 1879–1885
- Preceded by: Bryan O'Loghlen
- Succeeded by: Constituency abolished

Member of Parliament for County Carlow
- In office 1887–1891
- Preceded by: John Aloysius Blake
- Succeeded by: John Hammond

Personal details
- Born: Charles James Patrick Mahon; 17 March 1800 Ennis, County Clare, Ireland
- Died: 15 June 1891 (aged 91) South Kensington, London, England
- Party: Nationalist
- Other political affiliations: Whig

Charles James Patrick Mahon (17 March 1800 – 15 June 1891), known as the O'Gorman Mahon or James Patrick Mahon, was an Irish nationalist journalist, barrister, parliamentarian and international mercenary.

== Personal life ==
Mahon, the eldest of four children, was born into a prominent Roman Catholic family in Ennis, County Clare. His father, Patrick Mahon of New Park, participated in the Rebellion of 1798 while his mother, Barbara, was a significant heiress, being the only daughter of James O'Gorman of Ennis. Mahon received his education at Clongowes Wood College, where he was among the earliest pupils, and later at Trinity College Dublin, where he earned his BA in 1822 and his MA in law in 1832. Prior to his father's death in 1821, Mahon received an annual allowance of £500. Following his father's death, he inherited half of the family property and also became a magistrate for Clare. He subsequently adopted the title "the O'Gorman Mahon," with O'Gorman being his mother's maiden name. This move was partly intended to create the false impression that he was the head of the Mahon clan.

In 1830, Mahon married Christina, the daughter of John O'Brien of Dublin. Christina was an heiress with property valued at £60,000 in her own right, which provided Mahon with the resources to pursue election to parliament. Despite their marriage, the couple spent little time together, and Christina died in Paris in 1877, apart from Mahon. Together, they had one son named St John, who died in 1883.

Born in a time when duelling was relatively common in Ireland, Mahon later claimed to have instigated and fought thirteen duels; and in these, to have been injured in six but to have drawn blood in seven. These enhanced the tall, striking Mahon's dashing reputation.

== Politics ==
In 1826, Mahon joined the newly formed Catholic Association. He encouraged fellow member Daniel O'Connell to stand for election at the 1828 County Clare by-election. O'Connell's election, in which Mahon played a large role, persuaded the British Government to pass the Roman Catholic Relief Act 1829, which finalised the process of Catholic Emancipation and permitted Catholics to sit in the British Parliament.

As a result, when Mahon was elected for County Clare at the 1830 general election, he was entitled to take his seat. However, during the election campaign he quarrelled with O'Connell, and after his election he was unseated for bribery. He was subsequently acquitted, and stood again at the 1831 election, but was defeated by two O'Connell-backed candidates, one of whom was his old schoolfriend Maurice O'Connell, Daniel O'Connell's son. Mahon gave up on politics, became deputy lieutenant of Clare, and captain of the local militia.

At the 1847 general election, Mahon was elected for Ennis, and declared himself a Whig in favour of Irish Repeal. However, he opposed the Young Irelanders, and narrowly lost his seat at the 1852 election.

After exploits abroad he returned to Ireland in 1871 and was a founding member of the Home Rule League. Nearly ruined by his ventures, he even ended up at the Old Bailey as a consequence of his dealings, but was acquitted. He was defeated in Ennis at the 1874 general election, and also at the County Clare by-election in 1877. Finally, he won the 1879 County Clare by-election, and held the seat at the 1880 general election.

He was a close associate of Charles Stewart Parnell, who he successfully nominated for the leadership of the League in 1880, but in 1885 was dropped as a party candidate because of his age and his tendency to vote with the Liberal Party in Parliament. He was also embroiled in a court case disputing the will of his son, St John Mahon, who died in 1884.

Parnell personally ensured Mahon was a candidate at the 1887 County Carlow by-election, which he won at the age of 87 as a Nationalist. By this point, Mahon was the oldest MP in the House of Commons of the United Kingdom. He died at his home in South Kensington while still in office.

Mahon had served alongside William O'Shea as an MP, and the two were close friends. He introduced him and Katharine O'Shea, his wife, to Parnell. After Parnell was named in the O'Sheas' divorce case in 1890, Mahon split with Parnell, siding with the Irish National Federation. However, Parnell attended Mahon's funeral in Glasnevin Cemetery a few months later.

== Travels ==
Mahon became a barrister in 1834, but the following year, he left for Paris. There he associated with Charles Maurice de Talleyrand-Périgord, becoming a favourite at Louis-Philippe's court and working as a journalist. He travelled the world, spending time in both Africa, where he befriended Ferdinand de Lesseps, engineer of the Suez Canal, and South America, before returning to Ireland in 1846.

Following his defeat in the 1852 election, Mahon returned to Paris, then travelled on to St Petersburg, where he served in the Imperial Bodyguard. During this period, he journeyed through lands from Finland (where he hunted bear with the tsarevich) to Siberia. He then travelled across China, India and Arabia. His finances largely exhausted, he served as a mercenary in the Ottoman and Austrian armies before returning to England in 1858. Late that year, he left for South America, where he attempted to finance the construction of a canal through Central America. He investigated the disappearance of Commander Lionel Lambert, captain of the paddle sloop HMS Vixen, on which Mahon had voyaged, and forced the Peruvian Government to instigate an investigation which revealed that Lambert had been murdered. He reported these findings to Lord Palmerston, a former Parliamentary colleague.

Mahon then returned to soldiery. He served in a number of forces, often in honorary positions. In Uruguay he was appointed a general in the government forces during the Uruguayan Civil War. He also claimed to have commanded a Chilean fleet during the Chincha Islands War and to have served as a colonel in Pedro II of Brazil's army. Later legends claimed that he was made an archbishop while in Brazil.

When Mahon heard that the American Civil War had broken out, he went to fight for the Union. In 1866, he returned to Paris, where he was made a colonel in a regiment of chasseurs by Louis-Napoleon, but in 1877, he moved to Berlin, where he became a close associate of Otto von Bismarck. He was plagued by debts in this period, seeking money in speculative ventures, and in 1871 he returned to Ireland.

Parliament of the United Kingdom
Preceded by Daniel O'Connell; Lucius O'Brien	Member of Parliament for County Clare; 1830–1830; With: William Nugent Macnamara	Succeeded by William Nugent Macnamara; Maurice O'Connell
Preceded by Hewitt Bridgman	Member of Parliament for Ennis; 1847–1852	Succeeded by John David Fitzgerald
Preceded by Bryan O'Loghlen	Member of Parliament for County Clare; 1879–1885	Constituency abolished
Preceded by John Aloysius Blake	Member of Parliament for County Carlow; 1887–1891	Succeeded by John Hammond
Political offices
Preceded by Michael Thomas Bass?	Oldest Member of Parliament (not Father of the House); 1883–1885	Succeeded by Charles Pelham Villiers
Preceded by Charles Pelham Villiers	Oldest Member of Parliament (not Father of the House); 1887–1891	Succeeded by Charles Pelham Villiers
