= O'Loghlen baronets =

Irish title

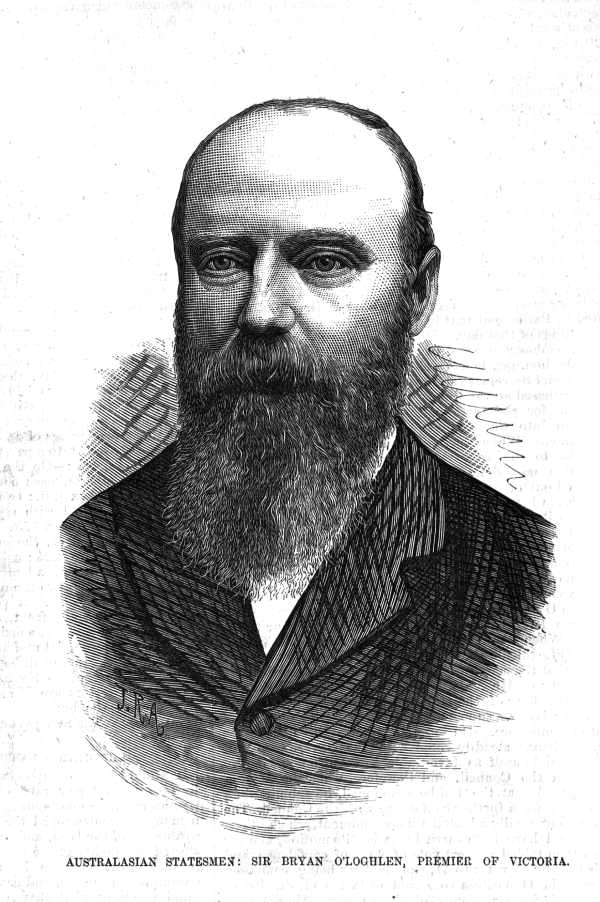
Sir Bryan O'Loghlen, 3rd Baronet

The O'Loghlen Baronetcy, of Drumcanora in Ennis was created on 16 July 1838 for the prominent Irish judge and Whig politician Michael O'Loghlen. He served as Master of the Rolls in Ireland from 1837 to 1842. The second Baronet represented County Clare in the House of Commons as a Liberal from 1863 to 1877. The third Baronet emigrated to Australia and served as Premier of Victoria from 1881 to 1883. The fourth Baronet was Lord-Lieutenant of County Clare between 1910 and 1922. The family surname is pronounced "O'Lochlen".

== O'Loghlen baronets, of Drumcanora (1838) ==
- Sir Michael O'Loghlen, 1st Baronet (1789–1842)
- Sir Colman Michael O'Loghlen, 2nd Baronet (1819–1877)
- Sir Bryan O'Loghlen, 3rd Baronet (1828–1905)
- Sir Michael O'Loghlen, 4th Baronet (1866–1934)
- Sir Charles Hugh Ross O'Loghlen, 5th Baronet (1881–1951)
- Sir Colman Michael O'Loghlen, 6th Baronet (1916–2014)

As of 2026, the Official Roll marks the baronetcy as vacant: Michael O'Loghlen (born 1945), eldest son of the 6th Baronet, has not proved his title.

Baronetage of the United Kingdom
Preceded by Wood baronets	O'Loghlen baronets of Drumcanora; 16 July 1838	Succeeded by Herschel baronets
