= Ennistymon House =

Coordinates: 52.9415°N 9.2975°W

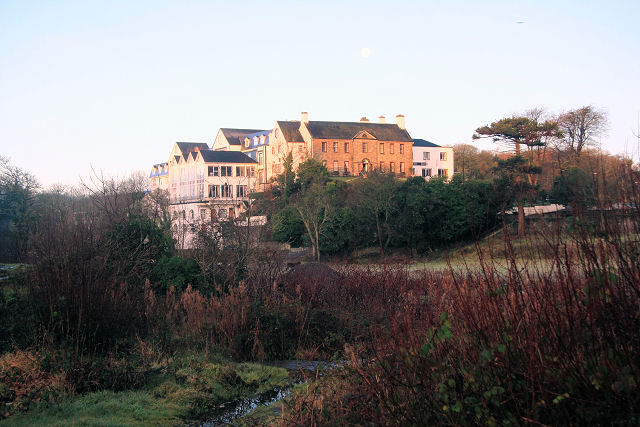
- Ennistymon House, now the Falls Hotel, Ennistymon

- Location within Ireland
- Alternative names: Ennistymon House

General information
- Type: country house
- Architectural style: Georgian
- Location: Castlequarter townland, parish of Kilmanaheen, Ennistymon, County Clare, Ireland

Ennistymon House, sometimes known as Ennistimon House, is a former country house in the town of Ennistymon, County Clare in Ireland. Built on the elevated site of a medieval castle, the 18th century house is now in use as a hotel. The hotel, the Falls Hotel, is owned by members of the McCarthy family.

== History ==
In 1564 the O'Briens of Thomond acquired a castle in a wooded estate by the Cullenagh river, on the western outskirts of what is now the town of Ennistymon. This castle was known as the "middle house", being situated between the other O'Brien castles at nearby Dough and Glann. It is uncertain who had originally built the castle, possibly Sir Domhnall (Donald) O'Brien or Donough MacDonall O'Conor of Corcomroe. Sir Domhnall was made Governor of Clare in 1576 and his son, Sir Turlough O'Brien, High Sheriff of Clare in 1578. Next to Dromoland Castle, this was the most important seat of the family.

In 1619 Sir Turlough was said to own the castle, the town and some 360 acres of land in the district. In 1656 he let the castle to Neptune Blood, the uncle of Thomas Blood, and in 1659 to Edward Fitzgerald.

In 1703 the site was described as having a castle with a two-storey house attached. In early 1712 the property was leased to Christopher O'Brien, whose son Edward (or Edmund) demolished much of the old castle in 1754. The new Georgian house was described in Weir's Houses of Clare as "A gable-ended, eighteenth century, two-storey, seven bay house over a basement, on a mound facing east towards the Ennistymon falls, with a central one-bay pedimented breakfront, containing a side and fan-lit front door, and a lunette above the second storey window… A yard and stabling stood some distance to the north-west."

In 1786, the house was referred to as Innistymond, the seat of Edward O'Brien.

In 1792 the house passed down to Edward's daughter Ann O'Brien and her husband, the High Court judge Matthias Finucane. Mathias retained it after their divorce in 1793. On the death of their only son Andrew Finucane in 1843, the house was inherited by his brother-in-law William Nugent Macnamara of Doolin, who died in 1856 at the age of eighty-one. His son Francis, an army captain and a lieutenant-colonel in the Clare Militia, moved into the house with his wife in 1863 and added a west wing.

The house passed in turn to his son Major Henry Valentine Macnamara, who suffered a period of rural unrest. In 1919, during the War of Independence, he was ambushed near Leamaneh Castle for actively supporting the old order, and received gunshot wounds to his face and arms. In 1922, the IRA notified him that they were confiscating Ennistymon House as a barracks and had burnt down his historic family home in Doolin. Henry Valentine left Ennistymon for London and never returned (he died in 1924).

The building then became the local station of the newly established Garda Síochána.

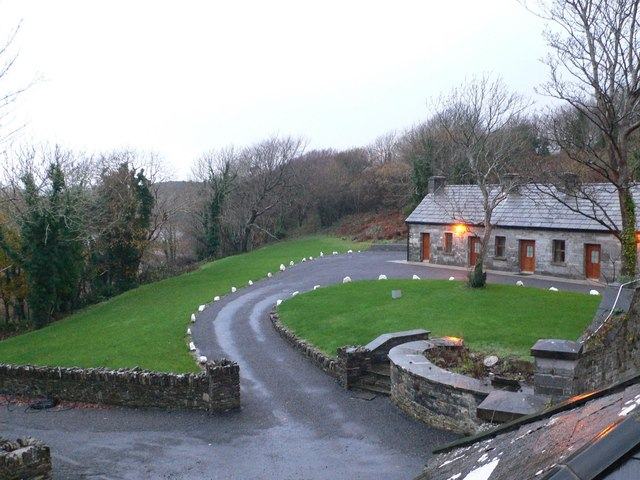
A house on the estate, formerly home to its gardener, is used as a guesthouse by the Falls Hotel

Henry Valentine's son Francis and his third wife Iris O'Callaghan-Westropp regained possession of Ennistymon House in the 1930s and converted it into the Falls Hotel. A poor businessman and in failing health, he eventually sold the property to Gerard Henry Williams-Owen.

In the 1940s, the hotel was run by Brendan O'Regan, who later was instrumental in the development of Shannon Airport.

In 1955 John F. Wood and his wife Bridget bought the hotel and (in 1959) added a 30-kWh hydroelectric plant to provide power to the building. Their son Tony and his wife Meg then ran the hotel for some years. Since 1986 the current owners have been Dan and Eileen McCarthy, who have further extended and improved the hotel.
