= 1879 County Clare by-election =

UK Parliamentary by-election

The 1879 Clare by-election was fought on 15 May 1879. The by-election was fought due to the resignation of the incumbent Home Rule MP, Bryan O'Loghlen, to become Attorney General of the Colony of Victoria. It was won by the Home Rule candidate James Patrick Mahon.
