= Colman O'Loghlen =

Irish baronet and politician

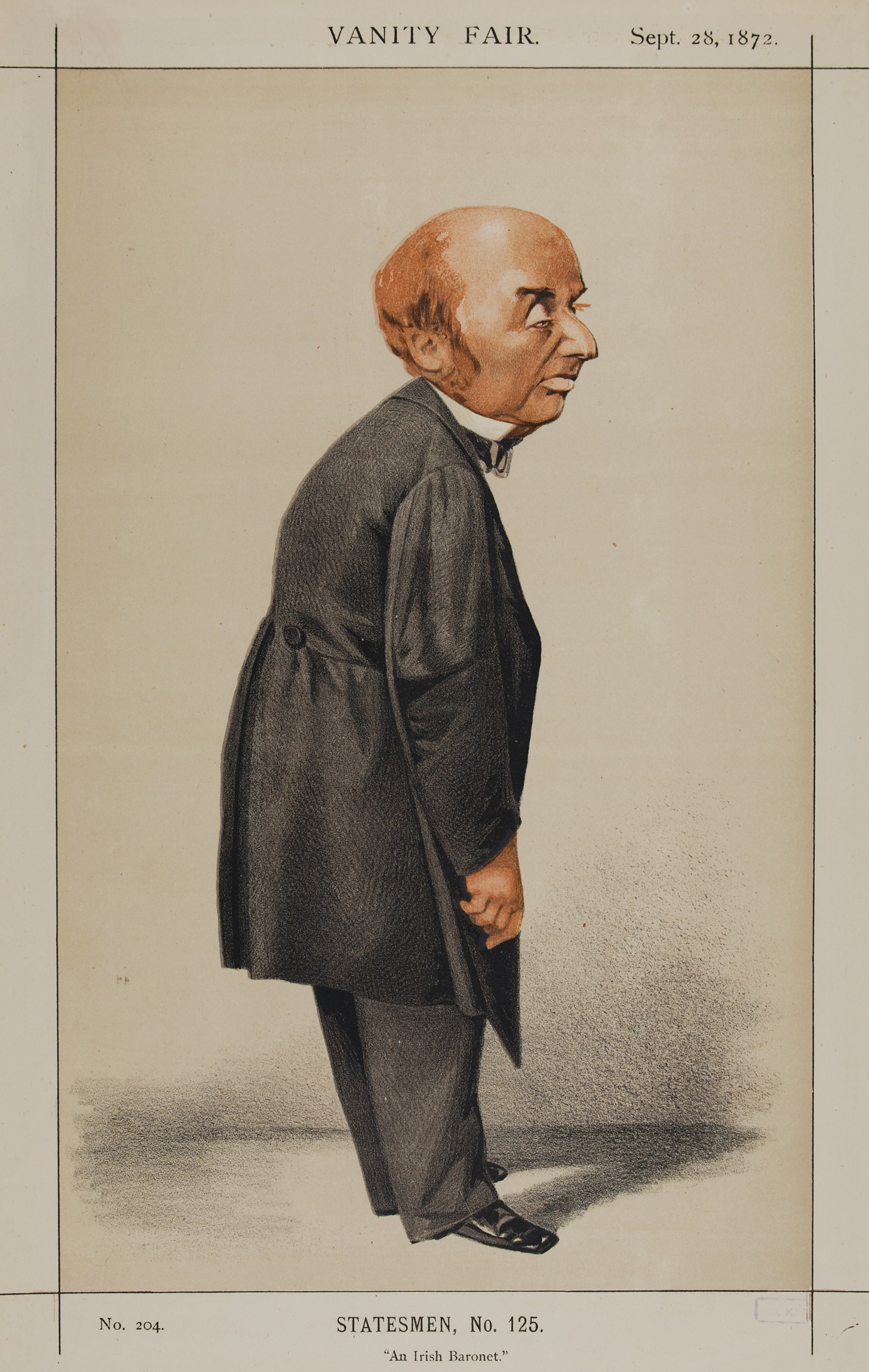
"An Irish Baronet" Sir Colman as caricatured by Adriano Cecioni in Vanity Fair, September 1872

Sir Colman Michael O'Loghlen, 2nd Baronet (pronounced and sometimes spelt O'Lochlen) (20 September 1819 – 22 July 1877) was an Irish baronet and politician.

O'Loghlen was born in County Clare, Ireland, eldest son of the distinguished Irish judge Sir Michael O'Loghlen, 1st Baronet and his wife Bidelia Kelly.

He was educated by the Jesuits at Clongowes Wood College, Co Kildare, attending from 1831 to 1833. He graduated from Dublin University in 1840 and was called to the Irish Bar later that year.

He succeeded to his baronetcy in 1842 on the death of his father, and in 1863 was elected to the British House of Commons for County Clare, holding the seat until his death. From 1868 until 1870 he also held the office of Judge Advocate General, which at the time was a political office.

He was elected a Member of the Royal Irish Academy in 1856.

He died in 1877, aged 57. He had no son and the title passed to his brother Bryan O'Loghlen, Premier of Victoria.

Parliament of the United Kingdom
| Preceded by Crofton Moore Vandeleur; Francis Macnamara Calcutt | Member of Parliament for County Clare; 1863 – 1877; With: Crofton Moore Vandeleur 1863–1874; Lord Francis Conyngham 1874–1877 | Succeeded by Bryan O'Loghlen; Lord Francis Conyngham |
Baronetage of the United Kingdom
| Preceded by Michael O'Loghlen | Baronet (of Drumcanora); 1842–1877 | Succeeded by Bryan O'Loghlen |
