= Donough O'Brien (b. 1595) =

Irish nobleman

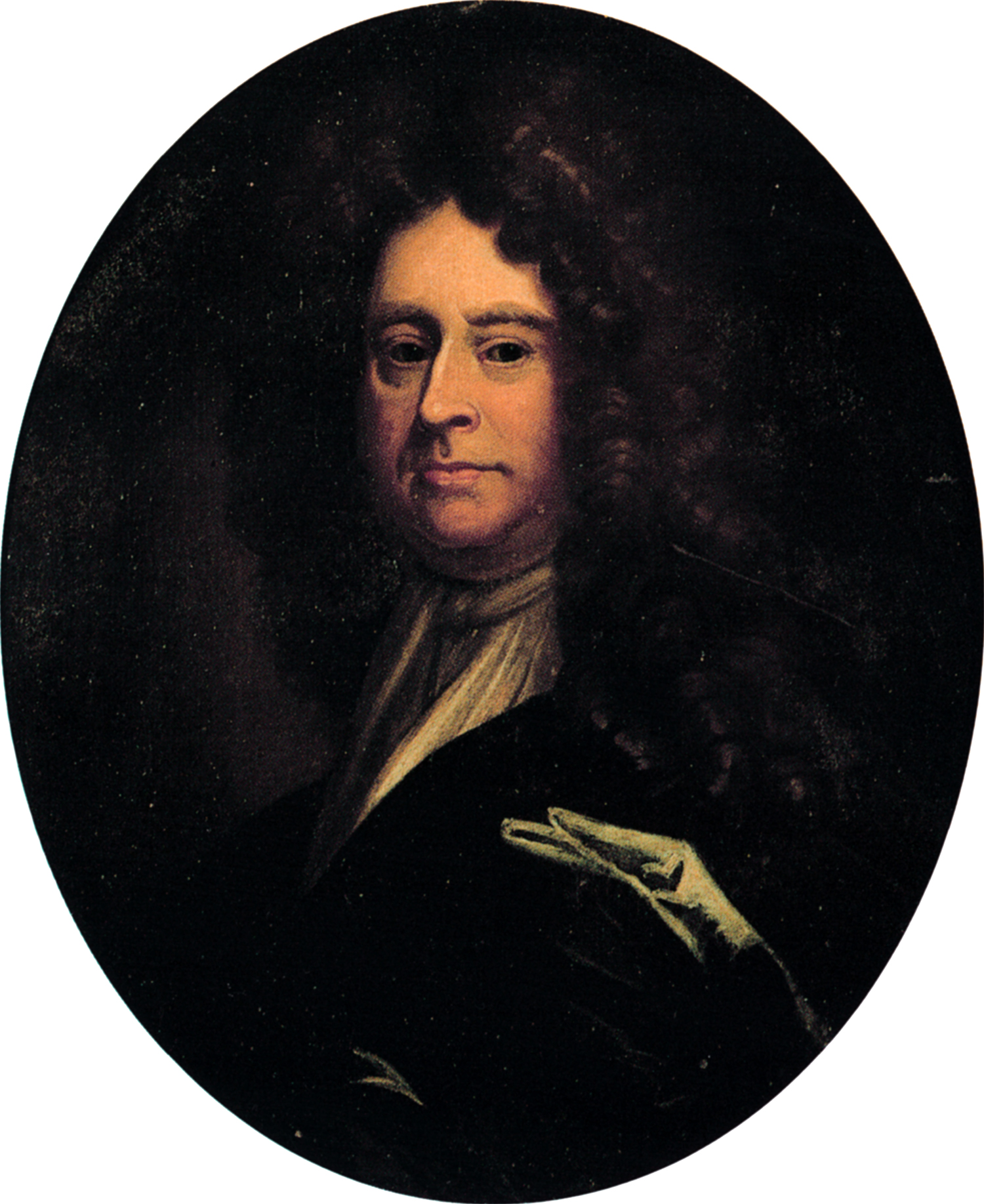
- Portrait of Donough which hangs in Dromoland Castle.
- Born: 1595; Leamaneh Castle
- Died: 1634 (aged 38–39)
- Spouse: Honora Wingfield
- Issue: Conor O'Brien; Donough O'Brien; Murrough O'Brien; Teige O'Brien; Margaret O'Brien
- Father: Conor O'Brien
- Mother: Slaney O'Brien

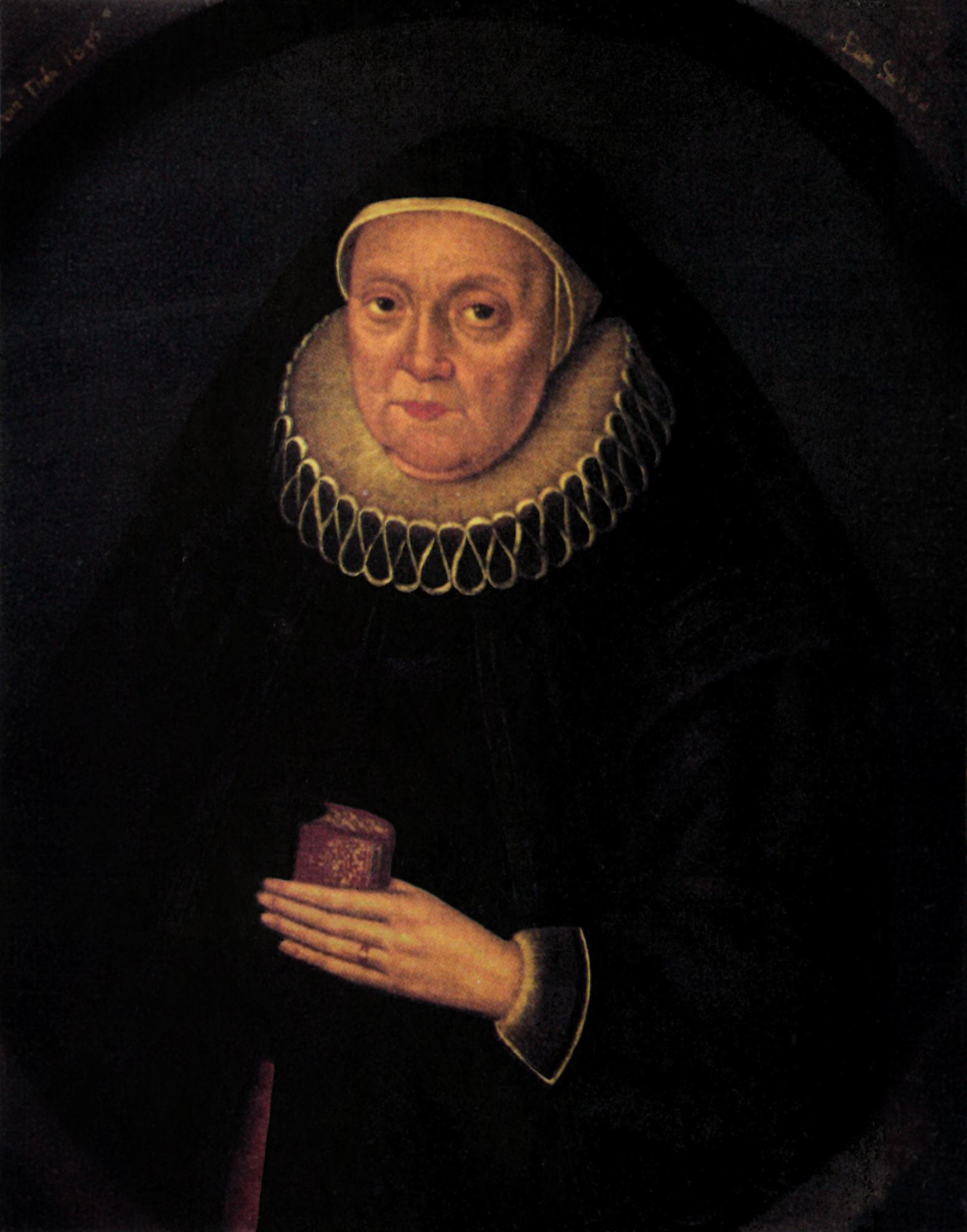
Slaney O'Brien, mother of Donough, 1636.

Sir Donough O'Brien (Irish: Donnchadh Ó Briain) (1595-1634) was an Irish nobleman of the O'Brien family of Leameneagh.

== Life ==
He was the son of Conor O'Brien (died 1603) and his wife Slaney O'Brien. He entered Trinity College, Dublin as a ward on 1 December 1614. (Note: see "History of the O'Briens from Brian Boroimhe, AD. 1000 to AD. 1945" page 202) He was knighted by Charles I. (Note: see "History of the O'Briens from Brian Boroimhe, AD. 1000 to AD. 1945" page 213)

In 1634 he was elected as a member of parliament for County Clare replacing his cousin Barnabas O'Brien whose stay in England had been protracted.

== Dispute over Dromoland Castle ==
His family's claims on Dromoland Castle began with the will of his great-grandfather Murrough O'Brien, 1st Earl of Thomond (died 1551) which specified that Dromoland (among many other properties) would pass to his son Donough O'Brien. Donough was attainted and hanged at the gates of Limerick in 1582 in an error, but was later pardoned with his lands being restored to his son and Donough's father Conor (died 1603). Nevertheless the Earl of Thomond attempted to prevent Conor from taking possession of Dromoland. Conor died in 1603 and his will specified that the lands of Dromoland, Ballygriffy and Leamanegh were to pass to Donough. With Donough still a minor at his father's death, the dispute on the ownership of Dromoland was thus continued by Donough's mother Slaney O'Brien and apparently settled by arbitration in 1613 with the Earl becoming owner and agreeing to pay £132 13s 4d in compensation to Slaney O'Brien. However, Donough refused to abide by this settlement in adulthood. In 1614 a William Starkey was shown leasing Dromoland from the Earl of Thomond. Donough continued to contest his claim on Dromoland through the Court of Wards and Liveries in Dublin after the Earl's death in 1626 and in 1629 was granted entry "on all the manors, lands and tenements of his late father" on payment of a fine. Dromoland, however, was not among the properties listed and remained in the possession of the Earls of Thomond until the freehold was assigned to Donough's grandson Donough in 1682. Henry O'Brien, 5th Earl of Thomond did however transfer two other properties to Donough as compensation.

== Family ==
He married Honora (1607 [sic] (Note: son Connor purportedly born 1617)-1637), daughter of Richard Wingfield of Robertstown, Limerick. The couple had five sons and one daughter:

- Conor, eldest, married Máire Rua McMahon in 1639
- Donough, lived at Tobermaly
- Murrough, married Amy, the daughter of Turlogh O'Brien of Cluonnan
- Teige, married daughter of William Cuffe
- Margaret, living 1698, married Turlogh O'Brien Fitz Teige of Dromore
