= Conor O'Brien (died 1603) =

Irish nobleman

- Born: c. 1570; Leamaneh Castle
- Died: 6 January 1603 buried in Ennis Abbey
- Spouse(s): Slaney O'Brien
- Issue: Donough O'Brien
- Father: Donough O'Brien
- Mother: Slaney McNamara

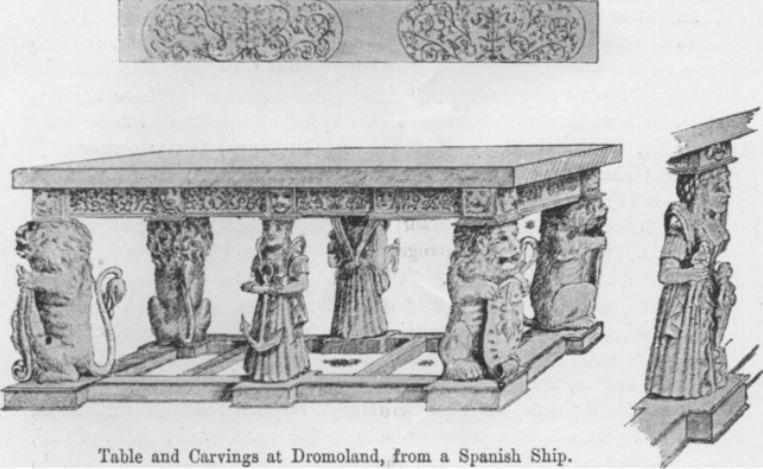
Illustration of table given by Boetius Clancy to Conor in 1588 made from parts of the wrecked Spanish Armada which had landed in Clare.

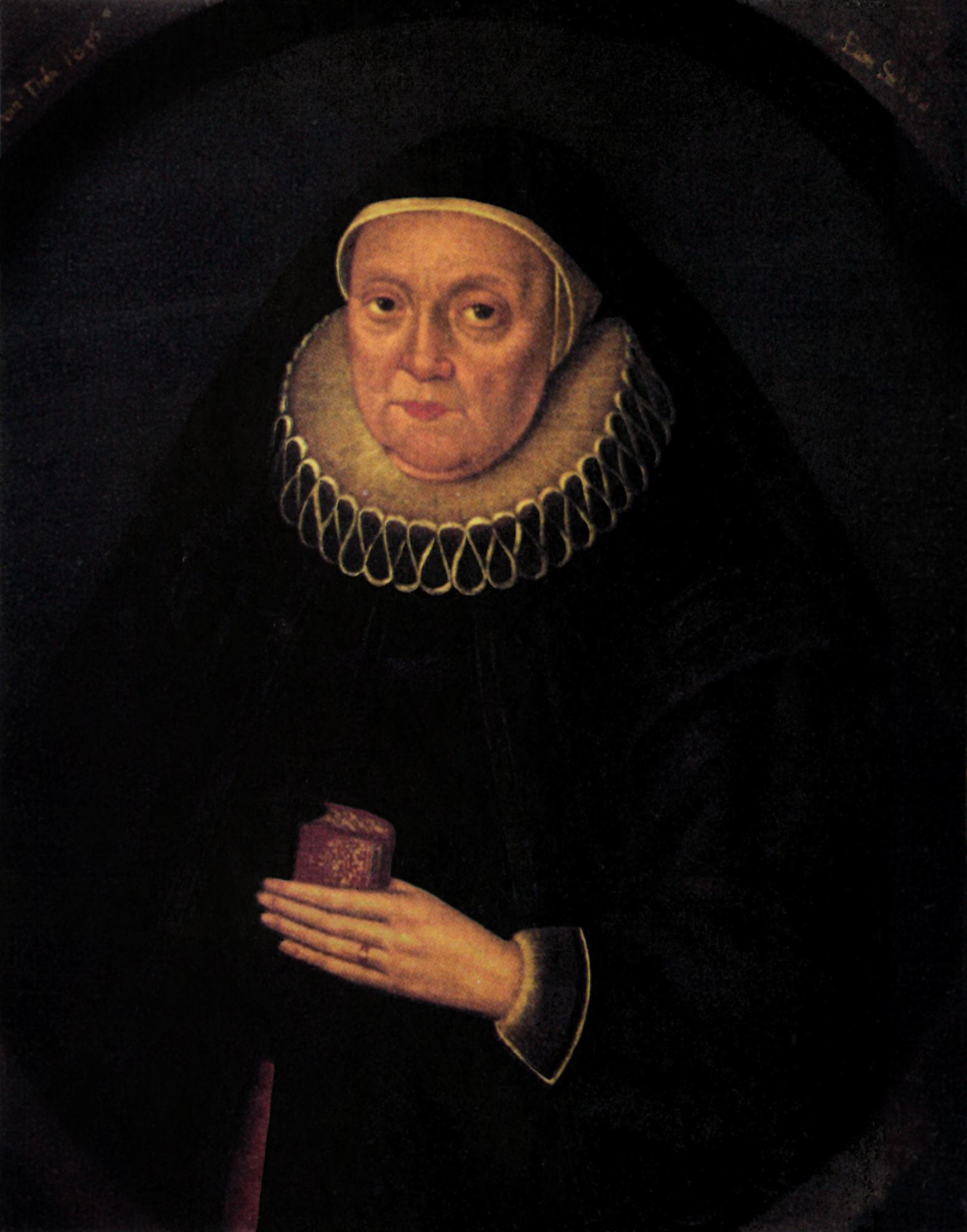
Slaney O'Brien, wife of Conor, 1636.

Conor O'Brien (Irish: Conchubhar Ó Briain) (died 1603) of Leameneagh was an Irish nobleman and land-owner in County Clare.

== Life ==
He was the son of Donough O'Brien and his wife Slaney McNamara.

Hugh Roe O'Donnell raided Thomond in 1599 and again in 1600 to punish the O'Briens for their adherence to the English and to avenge himself on the family of Murrough O'Brien, 4th Baron Inchiquin who, with Donogh O'Brien, 4th Earl of Thomond had invaded Tír Chonaill in 1597 under Sir Conyers Clifford. In his first foray into the territory, Hugh sent his lieutenant Aodh Maguire with a detachment to scour the lands of Kilnaboy where he wounded and captured Conor O'Brien, and brought him back to Inchiquin Castle which was given over to Maguire. Conor O'Brien was at this point acting as a guardian to Dermod O'Brien, 5th Baron Inchiquin who was only 4 years old, and was also in charge of Inchiquin Castle, since the death of the boy's father in 1597.

== Spanish Armada Table ==
According to tradition of the Barons Inchiquin, Boetius Clancy, then High Sheriff of Clare, presented to Conor the Spanish Armada table in 1588, made from parts of the wrecked Spanish Armada which had landed in Clare. The family were then living at Leamaneh Castle, and it was brought to Dromoland Castle when Conor's great grandson Donough had moved there in 1685 and was stored there for over 300 years before being sold at auction in 2018 by Lord Inchiquin.

== Family ==
He married Slaney O'Brien, daughter of Sir Turlogh O'Brien, the son of Domhnall mac Conchobair Ó Briain. He had a son, Donough. (Note: See page 202 "History of the O'Briens from Brian Boroimhe, AD. 1000 to AD. 1945")

== Death ==
He died on 2 January 1603 (as recorded in the Annals of the Four Masters) and was buried at the monastery of Ennis Abbey.
