= Sir Donough O'Brien, 1st Baronet =

Irish landowner and politician

Sir Donough O'Brien
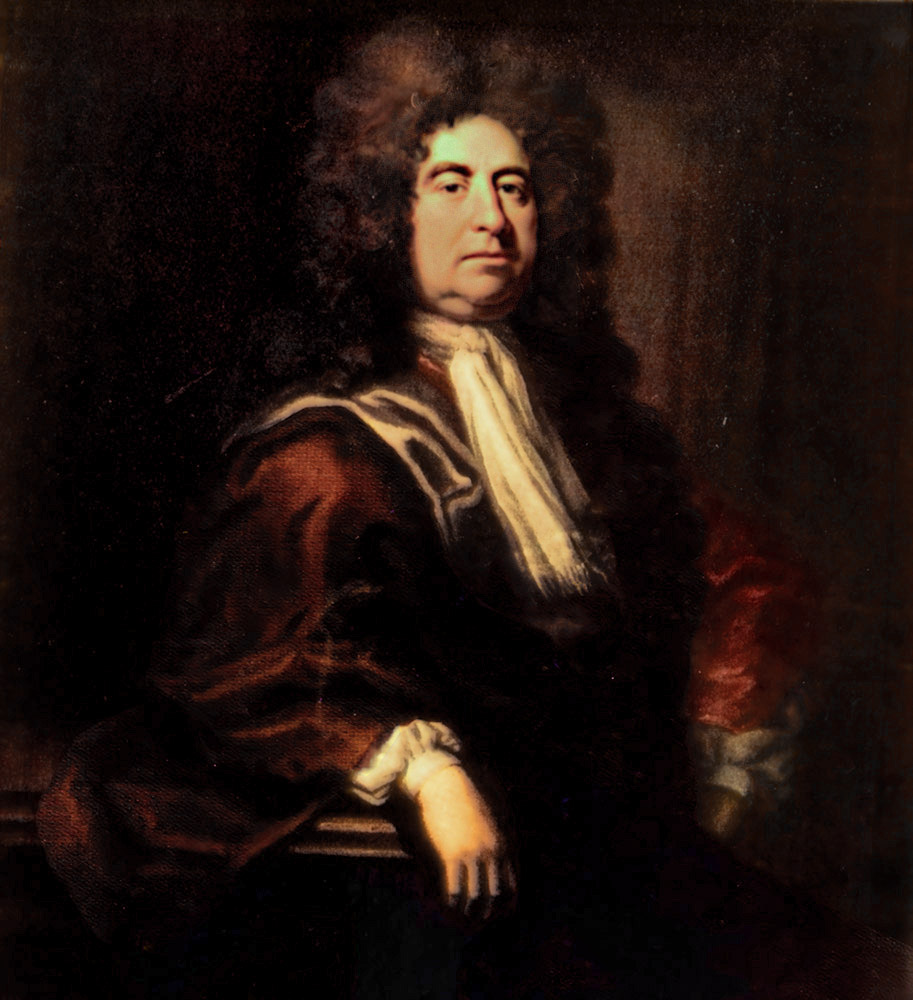
- Portrait of Donough by Mary Beale which hangs in Dromoland Castle.
- Born: 1642; Leamaneh Castle
- Died: 17 November 1717 (aged 74–75); Dromoland Castle
- Spouses: Lucia Hamilton; Elizabeth Deane
- Children: Lucius O'Brien; Honora O'Brien; Elizabeth O'Brien; Henry O'Brien
- Parents: Conor O'Brien (father); Máire Rua McMahon (mother)

Signature
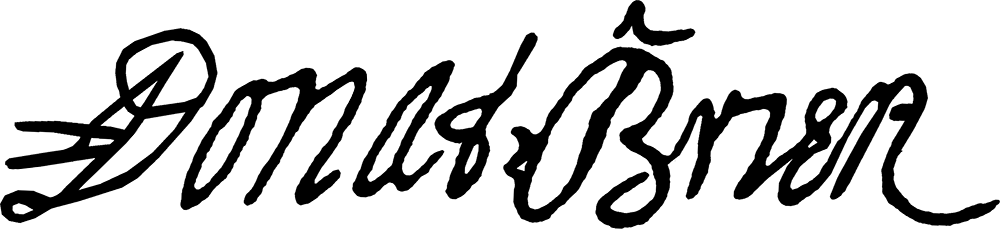

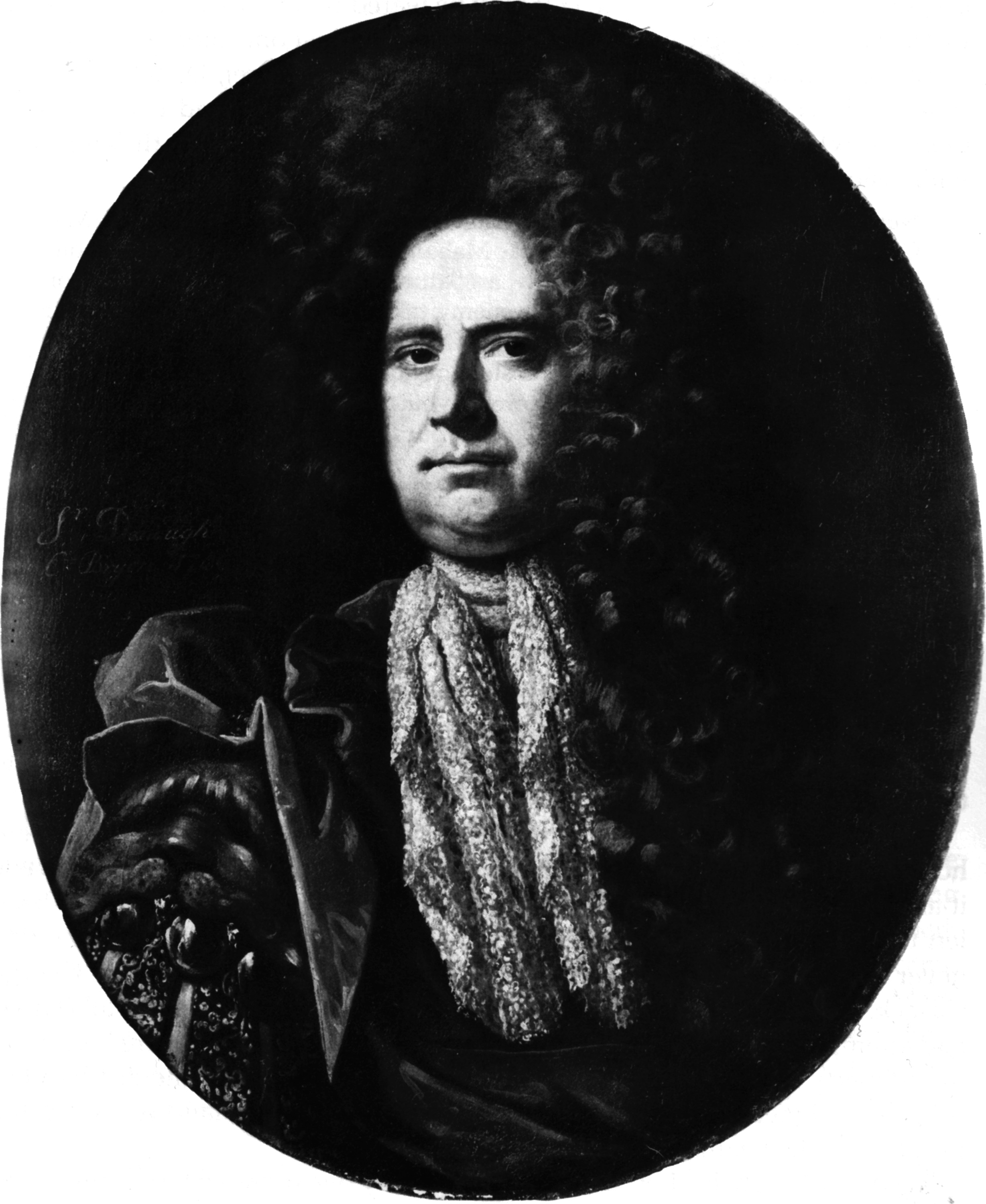
Donat O'Brien, 1st Baronet

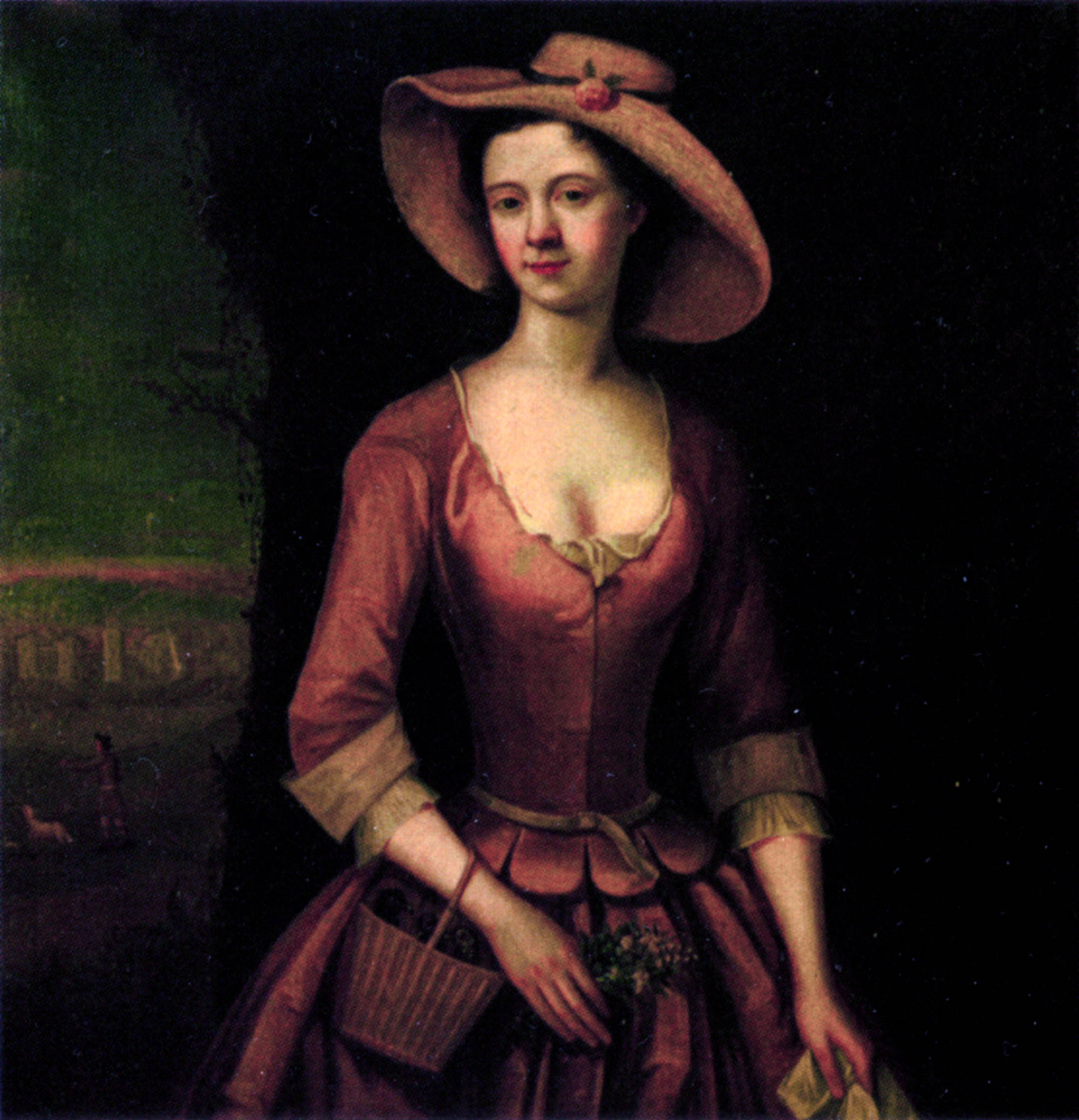
Lucia Hamilton, daughter of Sir George Hamilton. Wife of Donough, married in 1674. She died two years later, not long after the birth of his son and heir, Lucius.

Sir Donough O'Brien, 1st Baronet of Leameneh (1642 – 17 November 1717) was an Irish politician and baronet.

He was the son of Conor O'Brien of Leamanah and Máire Rua McMahon. He was the first member of his family to conform to the established church. He was an astute man who avoided declaring for either James II or William III. He was considered by his neighbours, ten years after the surrender of Limerick, as the richest commoner in Ireland.

His eldest son Lucius pre-deceased him and he was succeeded in his baronetcy by his grandson Edward O'Brien.

== Life ==
Donat was born in 1642 to Conor O'Brien of Leamaneh Castle and Máire Rua McMahon, the daughter of Sir Turlough McMahon, Lord of East Corca Baiscin. He was nine years old when his father, a Colonel of Horse, was slain in 1651, defending the pass of Inchicronan. His mother worked to ensure the land would be passed on to Donat by marrying a Cromwellian soldier named John Cooper, by whom she had a son Henry, at least eight years later.

In his early teens he was sent to London, through the efforts of his Cooper step-father, to study law in the Temple. Following the death of Cromwell and the Restoration, Donat returned to Ireland where he resided at Leamaneh Castle and remained a bachelor until July 1674, when a marriage contract was drawn up between him and Lucia Hamilton, the daughter of Sir George Hamilton. Lucia died after only two years of this marriage but bore Donat a son, Lucius in 1675. He remarried a year after to Elizabeth Deane, daughter of Major Joseph Deane (a Cromwellian soldier who had been granted land near Dublin), on 23 July 1677 in St. Werburghs Church, Dublin. With her he had a son named Henry and two daughters, Honora and Elizabeth. She too died after six years and was buried in St. Bride's Church Dublin in February 1684. For the rest of his life Donat remained a widower, and his household was managed by his housekeeper. His eldest daughter Honora died of smallpox in 1685 and his mother (Máire Rua) died in 1686. These deaths may have prompted Donat to write a Will in 1689. His younger daughter, Elizabeth later died, aged 18, in 1697, leaving Donat with his two sons, Lucius and Henry.

Dromoland Castle, which had been granted to Donat's great-great-grandfather Donough by his father Murrough O'Brien, 1st Earl of Thomond in 1543, had become crown property in 1582, upon Donough's hanging, and later passed to the Earls of Thomond from whom Donat's father had attempted to acquire it. The widow of the 7th Earl of Thomond assigned the freehold of Dromoland Castle to Donat, and from 1684 onwards it remained the property of the Leamaneh O'Briens.

In 1686 he was created a Baronet by the Catholic King James II, despite him being a Protestant. He showed no support for either James nor William in the conflict which followed, and suffered no adverse consequences. He captained a group of Dragoons in Clare numbering about 20 men in this time, to protect himself and his neighbours from rapparees. He was appointed High Sheriff of Clare in 1690.

In 1692, O'Brien entered the Irish House of Commons, sitting for County Clare until 1714.

His son Henry married Susannah Stafford, the daughter and co-heiress of William Stafford of Blatherwycke Park, Northampshire. Being a heraldic heiress she was entitled to use her own surname coupled with that of her husband. Henry had made his own arrangements for this marriage and had kept it a secret from his father.

He negotiated the marriage of his eldest son and heir, Lucius, in 1701 to Catherine, daughter of Thomas Keightley, an uncle in law of Queen Anne.

He was appointed to the Irish Privy Council by Queen Anne in 1711.

His son Lucius pre-deceased him in 1717, and he died the same year and was succeeded in his baronetcy by his grandson Edward.

== Death ==
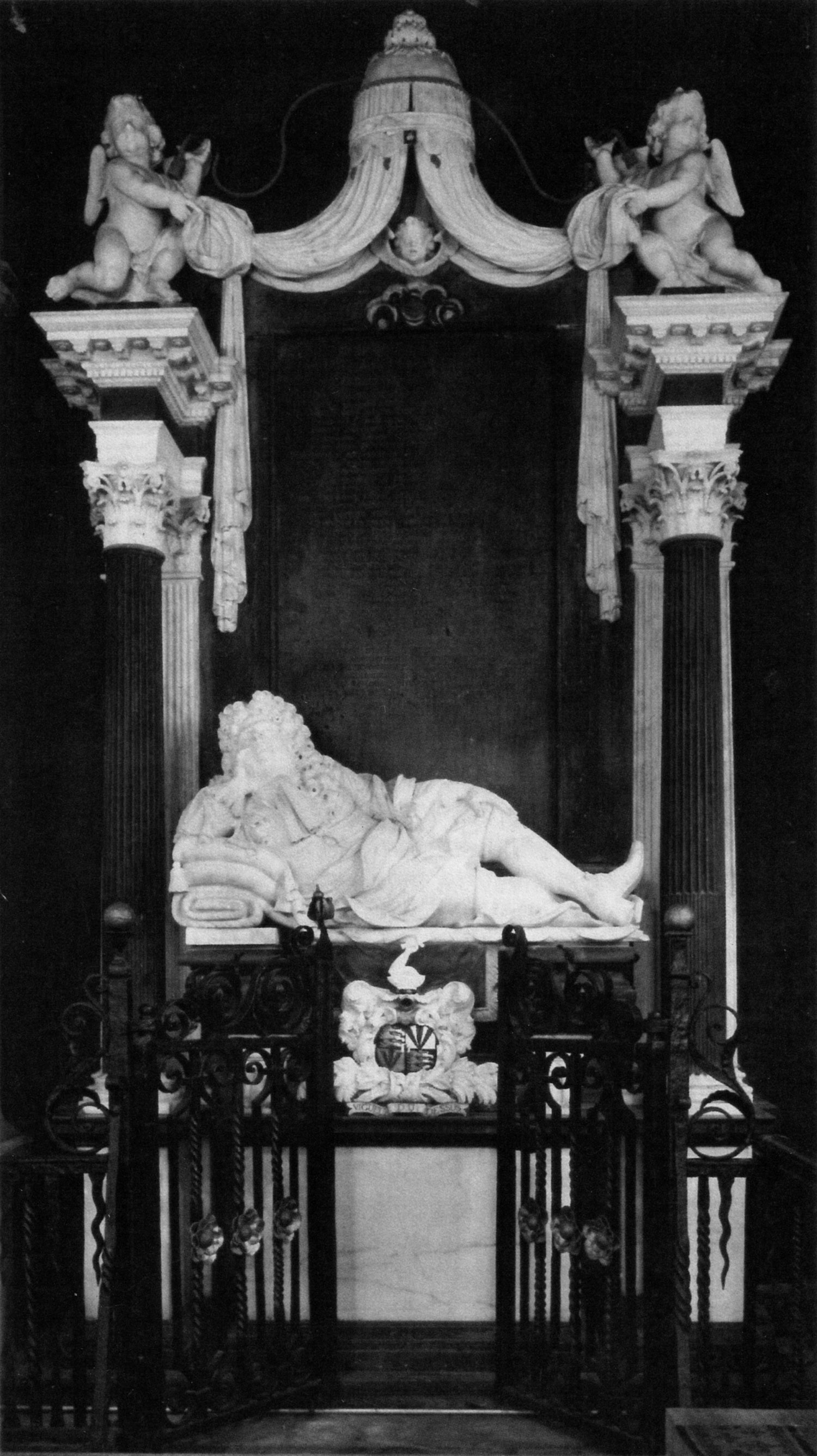
Donat O'Brien Monument, Kilnasoolagh Church of Ireland, erected by his son Henry.

He died on 17 November 1717 and was interred at Kilnasoolagh Church, where there is a marble effigy and monument, erected by his son Henry.

The Latin inscription reads:

Pause on your Way and Look
Beneath this Marble is hidden the Mortal Part of

DONATUS O’BRIEN Baronet

Who by the Lineage of his Forefathers was Noble
By his own Virtues far Nobler
A Man truly made for Humanity
Wholly born for Faith, Friendship, Favour
In Bodily Stature he was Tall and Handsome
The Dignity in his Aspect, the Majesty in his Speech
The Gravity in his Gait, the Simplicity in his Manners
Were Tokens of Prudence, Calmness, Authority
As a Father you could see none more Indulgent
As a Grandfather none more Kindly
As a Husband none more Loving
As a Friend none more True
The Public Highways and Bridges prove him a Protector of Trade
The Decorations of the Parish Church bespeak him truly its Son
An Orthodox Clergyman disturbed by Impious Strife
Cast out from his Benefice and by Wicked Violence bereft of his Flock
Found Shelter in his House (whenever the Wickedness of the Times required)
Thus showing Danger to Himself and his Neighbours
Thus showing Charity to his Brother Man and his Zeal for his Religion
For these Merits Fortune heaped Rewards on him
His so conspicuous Virtues were adorned by Wealth and Honour
He was a Member of the Royal Privy Council under Queen Anne
His Patrimony, honestly and notably increased, he bequeathed to his Children
To all Good Men he left Grief for his Loss
He died on the 18th day of November 1717 in the 76th year of his Age
This Monument as a Lasting Memorial of true and
Sincere Goodness was placed here by Henry
His second and only surviving Son
At his own Expense.

== Issue ==
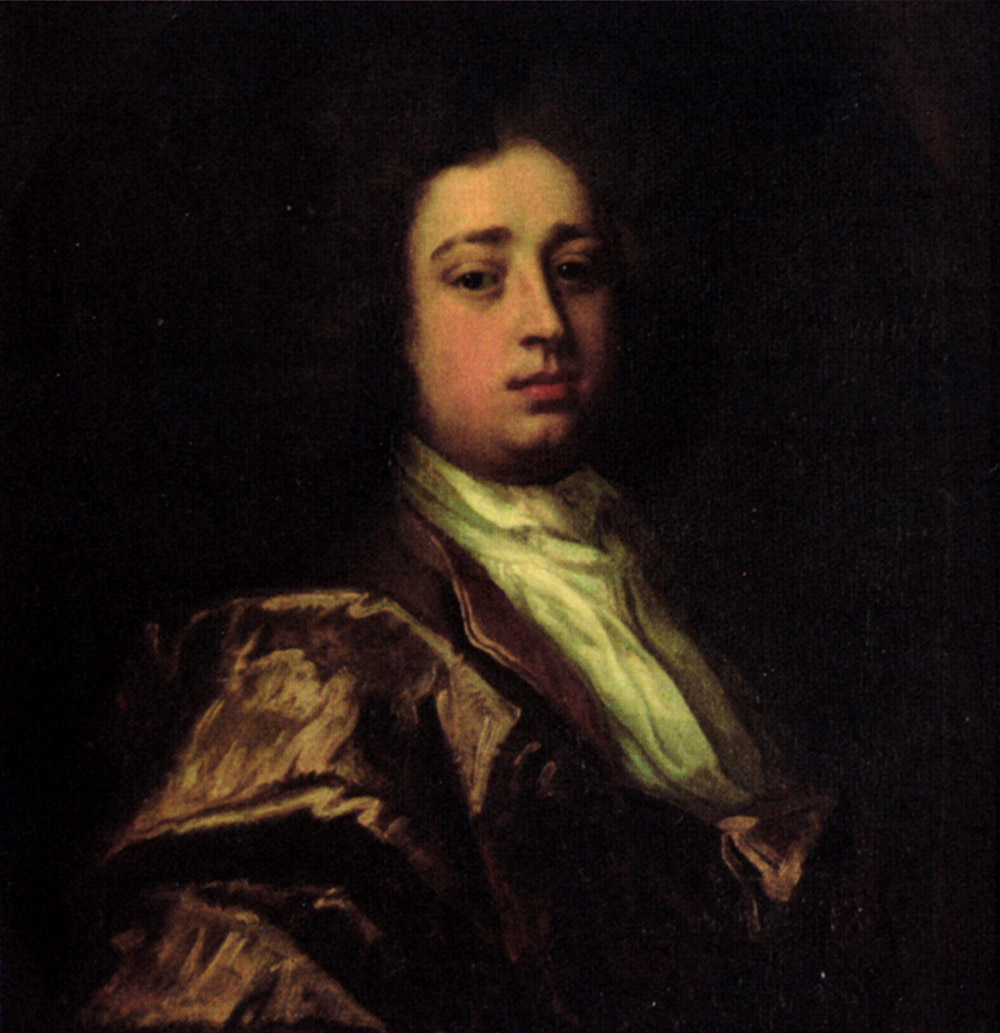
Lucius O'Brien, eldest son of Donough.

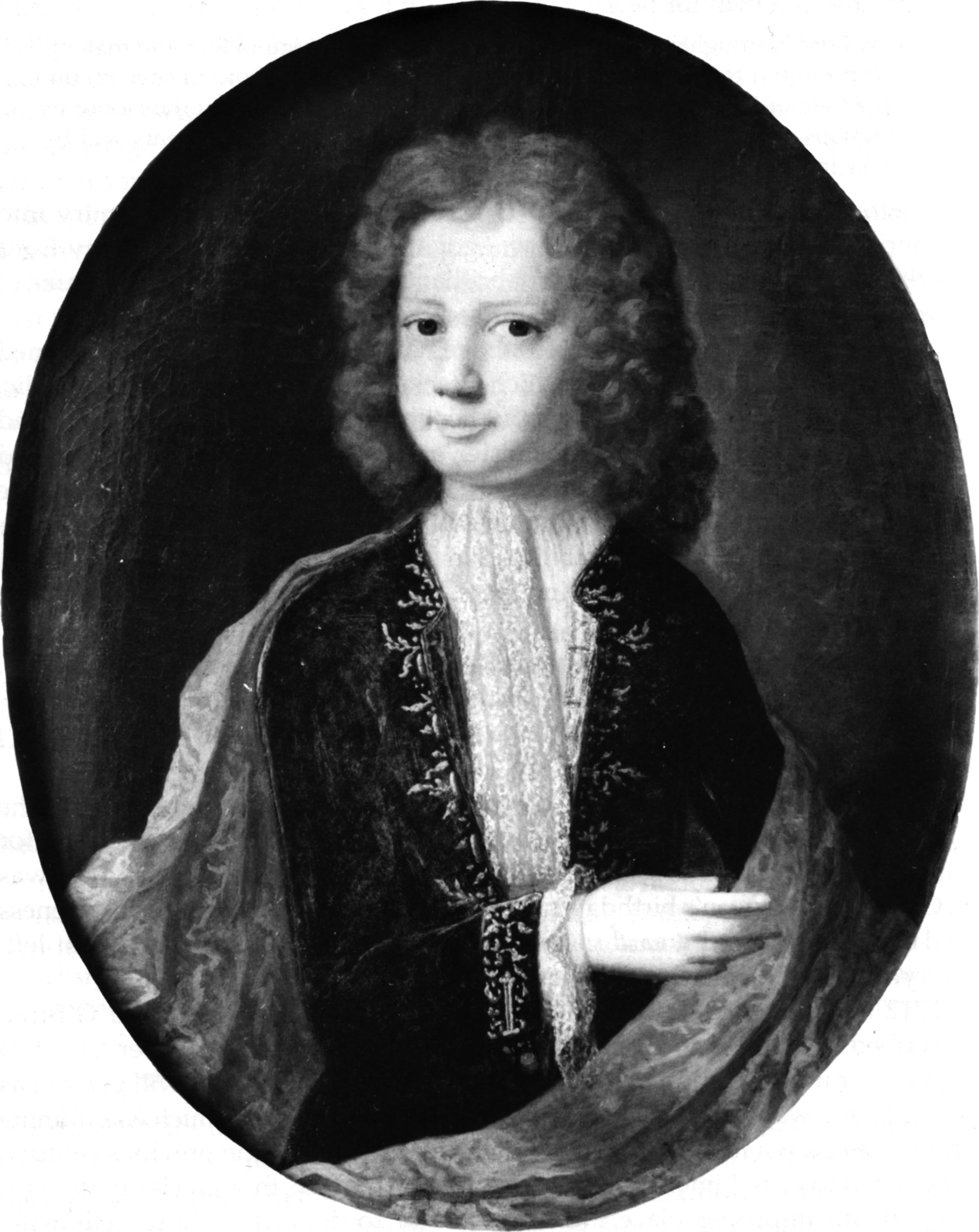
Portrait of Henry O'Brien (later Stafford O'Brien from his marriage to Susannah Stafford). Son of Donough O'Brien, 1st Baronet and Elizabeth Deane. Ancestor of the Stafford O'Briens.

By Lucia Hamilton:

- Lucius O'Brien (1675–1717)

By Elizabeth Deane:

- Honora O'Brien (1678–1685)
- Elizabeth O'Brien (1679–1697)
- Henry O'Brien (later Stafford O'Brien) (1680–15 Jan 1723)

== Ancestry ==
Ancestors of Sir Donough O'Brien, 1st Baronet

8. Conor O'Brien (died 1603)
4. Sir Donough O'Brien
9. Slaney O'Brien
2. Conor O'Brien
10. Richard Wingfield
5. Honora Wingfield
1. Sir Donough O'Brien, 1st Baronet
12. Sir Teige McMahon
6. Sir Turlogh McMahon
3. Máire Rua McMahon
14. Connor O'Brien, 3rd Earl of Thomond
7. Mary O'Brien
15. Una O'Brien

Parliament of Ireland
Preceded by Patriot Parliament	Member of Parliament for County Clare; 1692–1714; With: Sir Joseph Williamson 1692–1693; Sir Henry Ingoldsby, 1st Bt 1695–1699; Lucius O'Brien 1703–1714	Succeeded by Francis Gore; John Ivers
Baronetage of Ireland
New creation	Baronet (of Leaghmenagh); 1686–1717	Succeeded by Edward O'Brien
