= Clooneenagh =

Village in County Clare, Ireland

Clooneenagh Cluain Fhíne Clonina
- Village
- Location in Ireland
- Coordinates: 52°44′57″N 9°22′27″W
- Country: Ireland
- Province: Munster
- County: County Clare
- Time zone: UTC+0 (WET)
  - Summer (DST): UTC-1 (IST (WEST))

Clooneenagh (Irish: Cluain Fhíne), also Clonina, is a small village in west County Clare in Ireland. It is situated on the Cree Road between Cree East and Cree North near the villages of Doonbeg and Cooraclare. The nearest large towns are Kilrush and Ennis which are 7 miles (11 km) and 26 miles (42 km) away respectively.

Clonina is in the ecclesiastical parish of Cooraclare (Cree/Kilmacduane) within the Roman Catholic Diocese of Killaloe.

== People ==
Patrick Kelly (1875–1934) was born and raised in Clonina. He was a soldier, farmer and politician. He was a member of the Irish Free State Oireachtas (legislature) a Teachta Dála (TD) for the Clare constituency from 1927 to 1932.

== Geography ==
Many of the people living around Clonina are involved in agriculture and the majority of the land is used for dairy farming. The Creegh River flows through the village and enters the Atlantic Ocean at Doughmore Bay near Doonbeg.
