= Cooraclare (parish) =

Catholic parish in County Clare, Ireland

Cooraclare Kilmacduane
- Roman Catholic parish
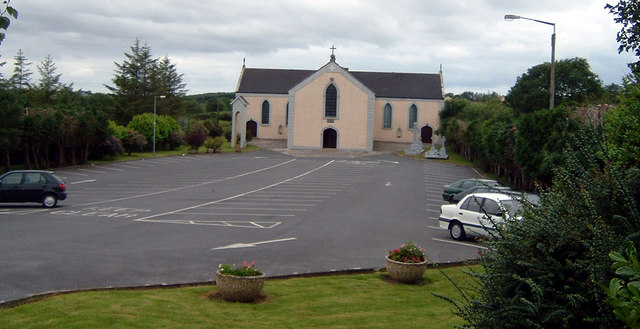
- St. Senan's Church Cooraclare

- Location in Ireland
- Coordinates: 52°42′14″N 9°25′06″W
- Country: Ireland
- Province: Munster
- County: County Clare
- Time zone: UTC+0 (WET)
  - Summer (DST): UTC-1 (IST (WEST))

Cooraclare, also known as Kilmacduane, is a parish in County Clare, Ireland, and part of the Roman Catholic Diocese of Killaloe. As of 2021, the co-parish priest was Anthony Casey.

The main church of the parish is the St. Senan's Church in Cooraclare, completed in 1836. This is a cruciform church. It was built in the time that the parish was still united with Kilmihil. Stones from the mediaeval church in Kilmacduane were used for this building.

The second church of the parish is the St. Mary's Church at Cree. This church was built in 1828 and predates the main church by several years.

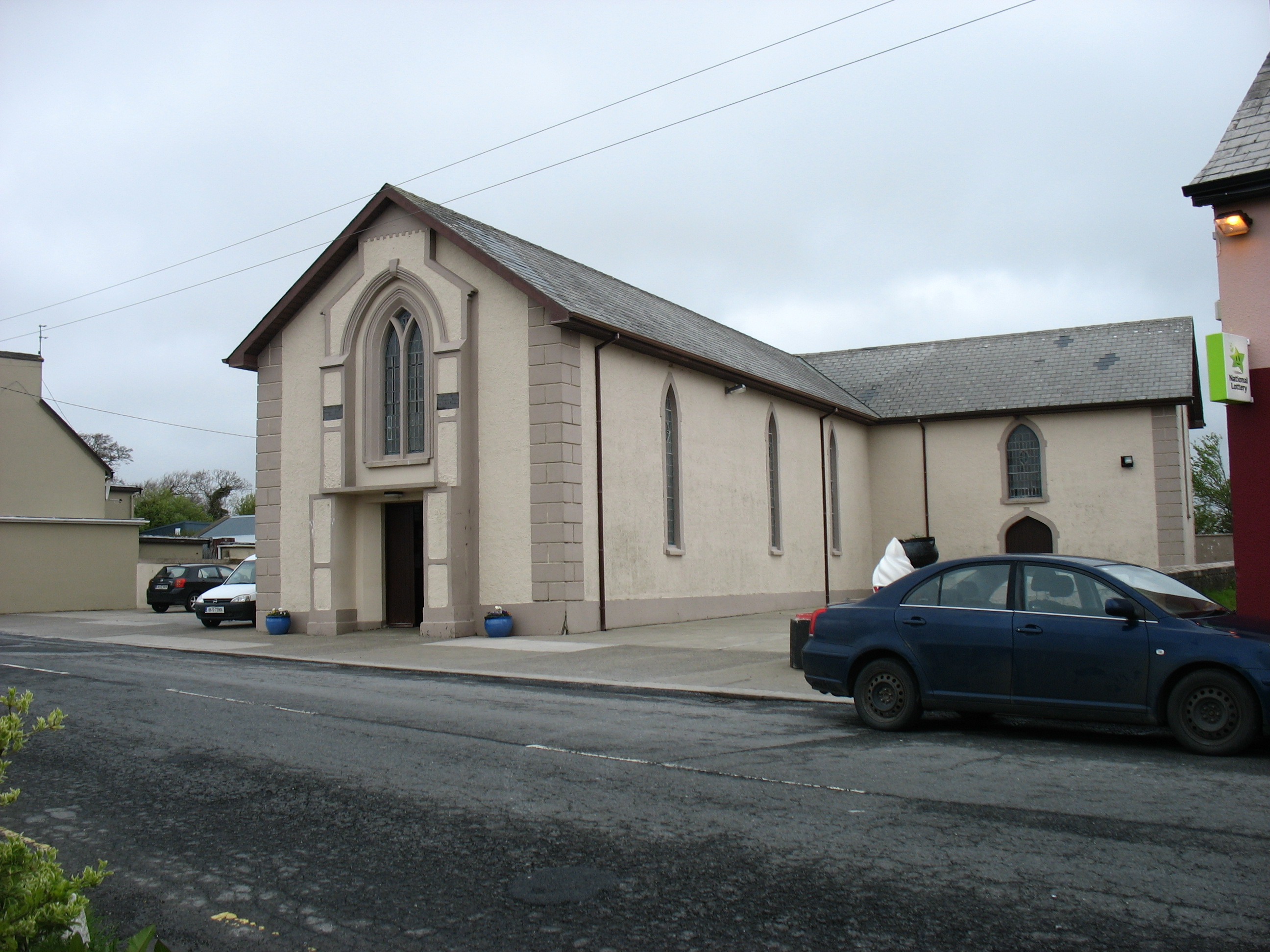
St. Mary's Church, Cree

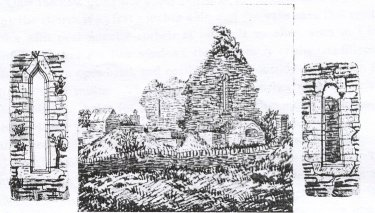
Drawing from mediaeval church of Kilmacduane

== See also ==
- Kilmacduane, civil parish
