= Thomas Morrissey =

Thomas or Tom Morrissey may refer to:

- Thomas Morrissey (Jesuit), Irish historian, teacher and writer
- Thomas Morrissey (athlete) (1888–1968), American long-distance runner
- Tom Morrissey (politician) (born 1956), Irish politician and businessman
- Tom Morrissey (baseball) (1860–1941), American Major League Baseball player
- Tom Morrissey (hurler) (born 1996), Irish hurler
- Tom Morrissey (Gaelic footballer)
