= Conor O'Brien (died 1651) =

Royalist soldier in the Irish Confederate Wars

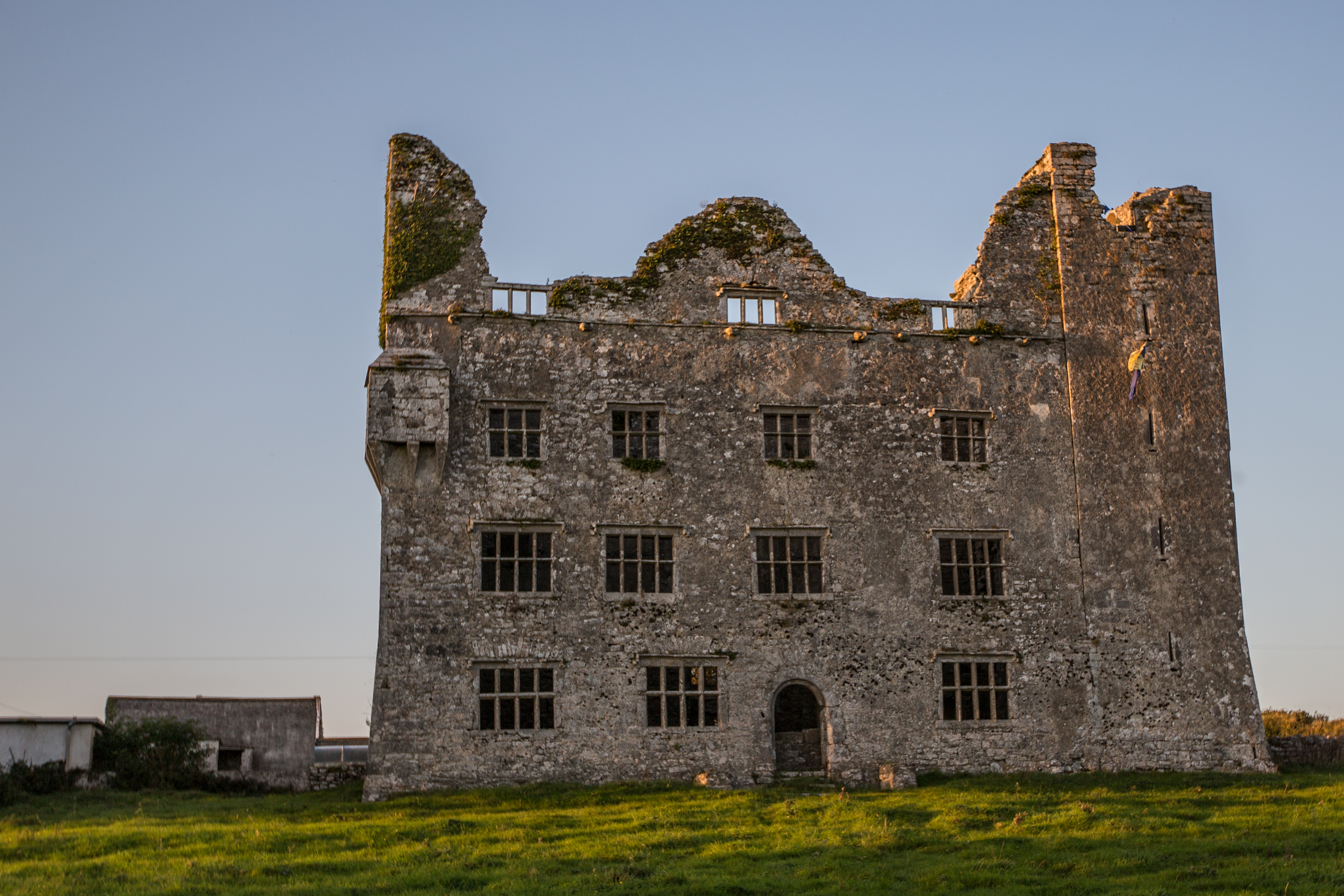
Leameneh Castle, outside of which Conor was killed in battle by Ludlow's cavalry.

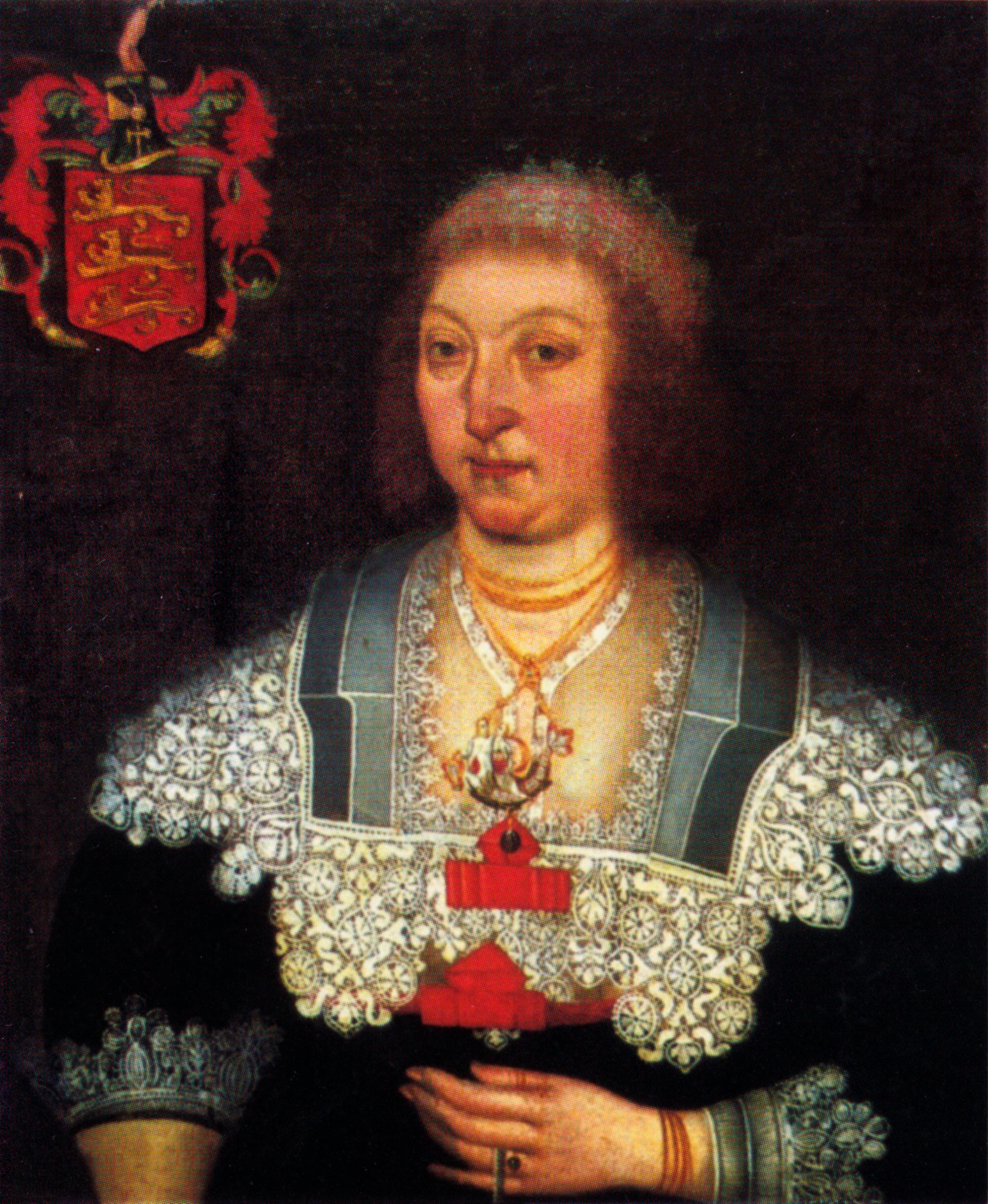
Máire Rua O'Brien (née McMahon), wife of Conor.

Conor O'Brien (Irish: Conchubhar Ó Briain) of Leameneagh (1617–1651) was a Royalist Commander in County Clare during the Irish Confederate Wars.

== Life ==
He was the son of Sir Donough O'Brien (1595-1637) and his wife Honora Wingfield, and was the head of the Leameneagh branch of the O'Briens with estates centred around Leameneagh and Dromoland.

At the outbreak of the Irish Rebellion of 1641, his relative Murrough O'Brien, 1st Earl of Inchiquin deputised him to advance the Royalist cause in County Clare and to maintain order amongst the discontented factions, while he himself was engaged in the south of the kingdom in co-operating with his father-in-law, Sir William St Leger, to oppose the Confederate armies.

Previous to the surrender of Limerick, Lord Muskerry had collected about five thousand men in the counties of Cork and Kerry, which, with a force of three thousand more in the county of Clare, were destined for the relief of that city. The former were defeated and dispersed by Lord Broghil at the Battle of Knocknaclashy and Edmund Ludlow was ordered to the pass of Inchicronan to check the advance of the latter. At this place the Irish offered a determined resistance.

His residence, Leamaneh Castle was besieged and he was killed at the head of his men by Ludlow's cavalry near Inchicronan a few miles away from the castle, being shot from his horse, and his troops then retreating. His sword (which was used at the engagement with Ireton's forces) is preserved at Dromoland Castle, being in the family's possession for over 300 years. An unsubstantiated legend states that his body was brought back to the castle by Ludlow's soldiers and presented to his wife Maire Rua O'Brien who repudiated it, insisting she was not married, and married a Cromwellian soldier in order to maintain her family's estates. The castle was then occupied by Ludlow's troops.

== Family ==
He married Máire Rua McMahon daughter of lord of East Corcabaskin or Clonderalaw, Sir Torlach Rua MacMahon and his wife Mary, the youngest daughter of Connor O'Brien, 3rd Earl of Thomond and had eight children, three of which died in infancy, the surviving children were:

- Donough, his eldest son, who was eventually re-invested in his father's estates.
- Teige
- Turlagh
- Honora
- Mary
