= San Esteban (1588 shipwreck) =

Spanish ship wrecked on Irish coast

History

Spain
- Name: San Esteban
- Owner: Spanish navy
- In service: 1586
- Stricken: 20 September 1588
- Fate: Wrecked

General characteristics
- Class & type: Carrack
- Tons burthen: 736
- Length: 37.6 metres (123 ft)
- Beam: 10.7 metres (35 ft)
- Draught: 4.9 metres (16 ft)
- Propulsion: Sail
- Armament: 26 guns

The San Esteban was a ship of the Spanish Armada that was wrecked on the west coast of Ireland in 1588. All the survivors were killed when they reached the shore or taken prisoner and later hanged.

== Construction ==
The San Esteban was probably built in Cantabria in 1586. She displaced 736 tons and had 26 guns. She was 37.6 metres (123 ft) long, with a beam of 10.7 metres (35 ft) and a draught of 4.9 metres (16 ft).

== Career ==
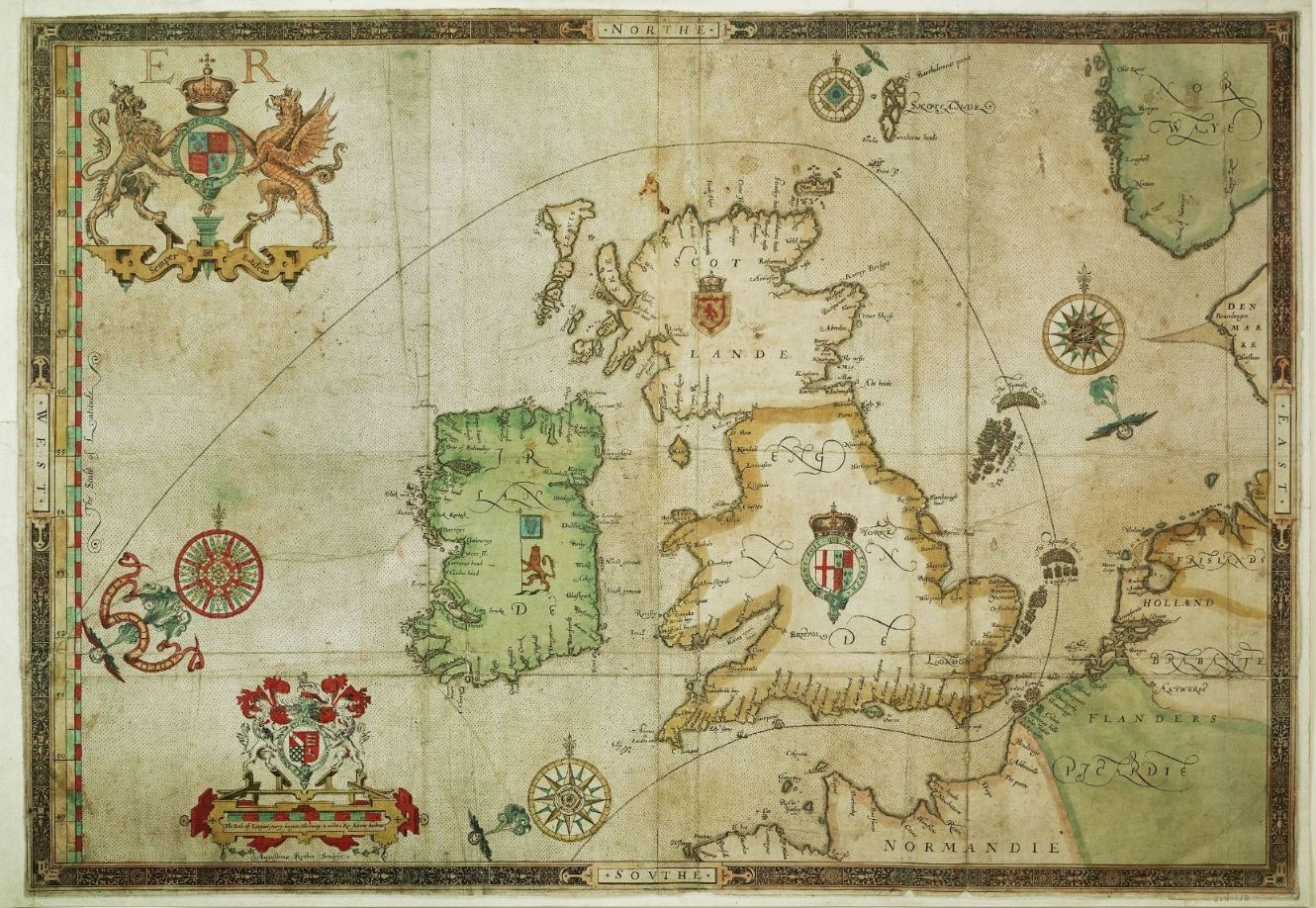
Route of the Armada (1590 map)

In October 1585 King Philip II of Spain decided to invade England. The Armada (fleet) would travel from Spain to the Netherlands, from where it would escort the invading army under Alexander Farnese, Duke of Parma. The San Esteban was assigned to the Guipuzcoa Squadron commanded by Almirante Miguel de Oquendo y Segura. Her captain was Don Felipe de Córdoba. She carried 196 soldiers and 68 mariners.

The Armada set sail from Corunna on 19 July 1588, and entered the English Channel on 30 July. The fleet was attacked by English ships repeatedly as it ran through the channel, and on the night of 7–8 August was attacked by fire ships. On 8 August there was a confused fight off Gravelines. During this engagement the wind carried the Armada into the North Sea. It was not possible for it to return to escort Parma's troops, so the Spanish were forced to abandon the enterprise.

The Armada attempted to return to Spain by sailing north, rounding Scotland, and returning along the west coast of Ireland. However, their charts were inaccurate and the Spanish were sailing in unfamiliar waters. 26 of the 128 ships were wrecked on the Irish coast. The San Esteban was wrecked on 20 September 1588 near the mouth of the Doonbeg River, western Ireland. The same day the San Marcos was wrecked near what is now called Spanish Point, Clare, and the Annunciada in the Scattery roads of the Shannon Estuary.

== Aftermath ==
Location of the wreck

Sixty men managed to reach shore from the San Esteban. Some of the survivors were killed when they reached land by the local people or by the English soldiers. Others, including four from the San Marcos, were taken captive by Boetius Clancy, High Sheriff of Clare, and held at his castle near Spanish Point. He arranged for all the prisoners to be hanged at Cnoc na Crocaire near Spanish Point. They were buried in a mass grave that continues to be called Tuama na Spaineach (Tomb of the Spanish). Despite an exhaustive search, the exact site of the wreck remains uncertain.
