= Máire Rua O'Brien =

Irish aristocrat

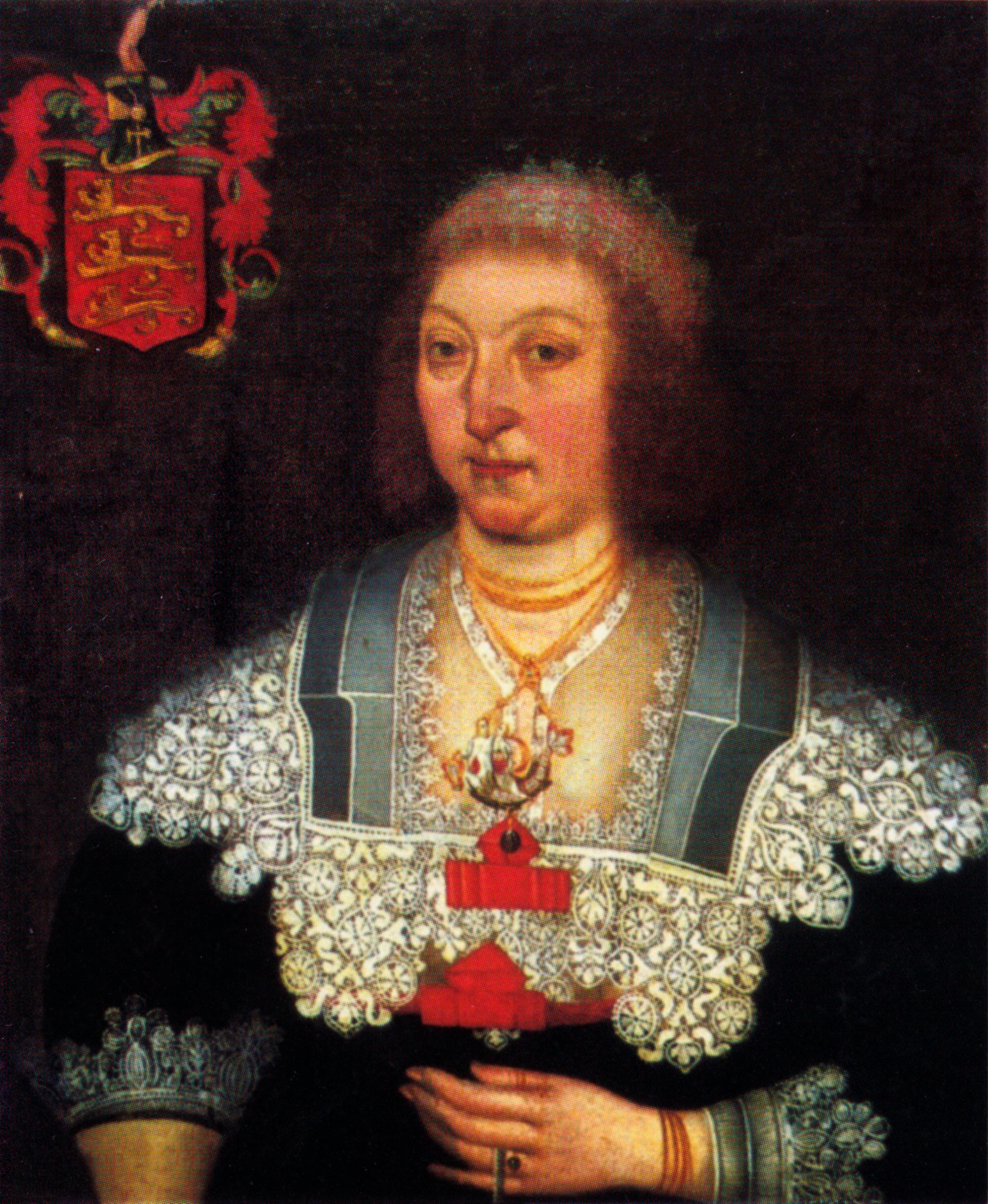
- Born: Máire Rua MacMahon; 1615/1616; Clonderalaw, County Clare, Ireland
- Died: 1686 (aged 70/71)
- Resting place: Ennis Abbey (or Coad Church)
- Known for: Retaining family lands at Leamaneh Castle
- Spouses: Daniel Neylon of Dysert (c.1634-1639); Conor O'Brien of Leamaneh (c.1639-1651); John Cooper of Bunratty (c.1651-1686†)
- Children: Sir Donough O'Brien, 1st Baronet (son)

Máire Rua O'Brien (1615/1616 – 1686) was an Irish aristocrat who married three times to retain family lands. Born into the MacMahon family of Thomond, her name, Máire Rua or Red Mary, derived from her red hair. First married to Daniel Neylon (O'Neillan) of Dysert O'Dea Castle in north County Clare, after his death in 1639, she married Conor O'Brien of Leamaneh Castle. With her second husband, she backed the Royalist cause against Cromwell's forces during the Eleven Years' War. However, after her second husband was killed in 1651, she married a Cromwellian officer; in a reputed attempt to save her estate. Remaining on her estate at Leamaneh for several decades, her son Donough O'Brien moved the family seat to the larger Dromoland Castle where she lived until her death in 1686. A sometimes notorious figure in Irish folklore, a number of exaggerated stories and legends are associated with her life.

== Early life ==
Born in 1615 or 1616, and named Máire (Mary) MacMahon, she became known as Máire Rua or Red Mary due to her red hair. She was the daughter of lord of East Corcabaskin or Clonderalaw, Sir Torlach Rua MacMahon and his wife Mary, the youngest daughter of Connor O'Brien, 3rd Earl of Thomond. Some sources have her place of birth as Bunratty, but it is likely she was born at Clonderalaw. O'Brien family tradition gives her place of birth as Urlan More, but she may have been fostered rather than born there.

In 1634, she married colonel Daniel Neylon who fought in the English army in the Spanish war, the marriage having been arranged. She lived with Neylon at the Dysert (O'Dea) Castle in County Clare, and had three sons with him; William, Daniel and Michael. She was widowed, while her children were still young, when Neylon died in 1639. She managed the large Neylon estate until her eldest son William came of age.

== Life at Leamaneh Castle ==
Seven months after Neylon's death, she married her cousin, Conor O'Brien of Leamaneh. The couple extended the O'Brien tower house at Leamaneh, creating Leamaneh Castle. An inscription on the castle reads: "This was built in the year of Our Lord 1648 by Conor O'Brien and Mary ní Mahon alias Brien wife to the said Conor". The couple had eight children, the eldest of whom, Sir Donough O'Brien, was born in 1642. The other known children were Teige, Turlough, Murrough, Honora, and Mary, with two other daughters who are believed to have died during the plague which affected the area during the Siege of Limerick (1650–1651).

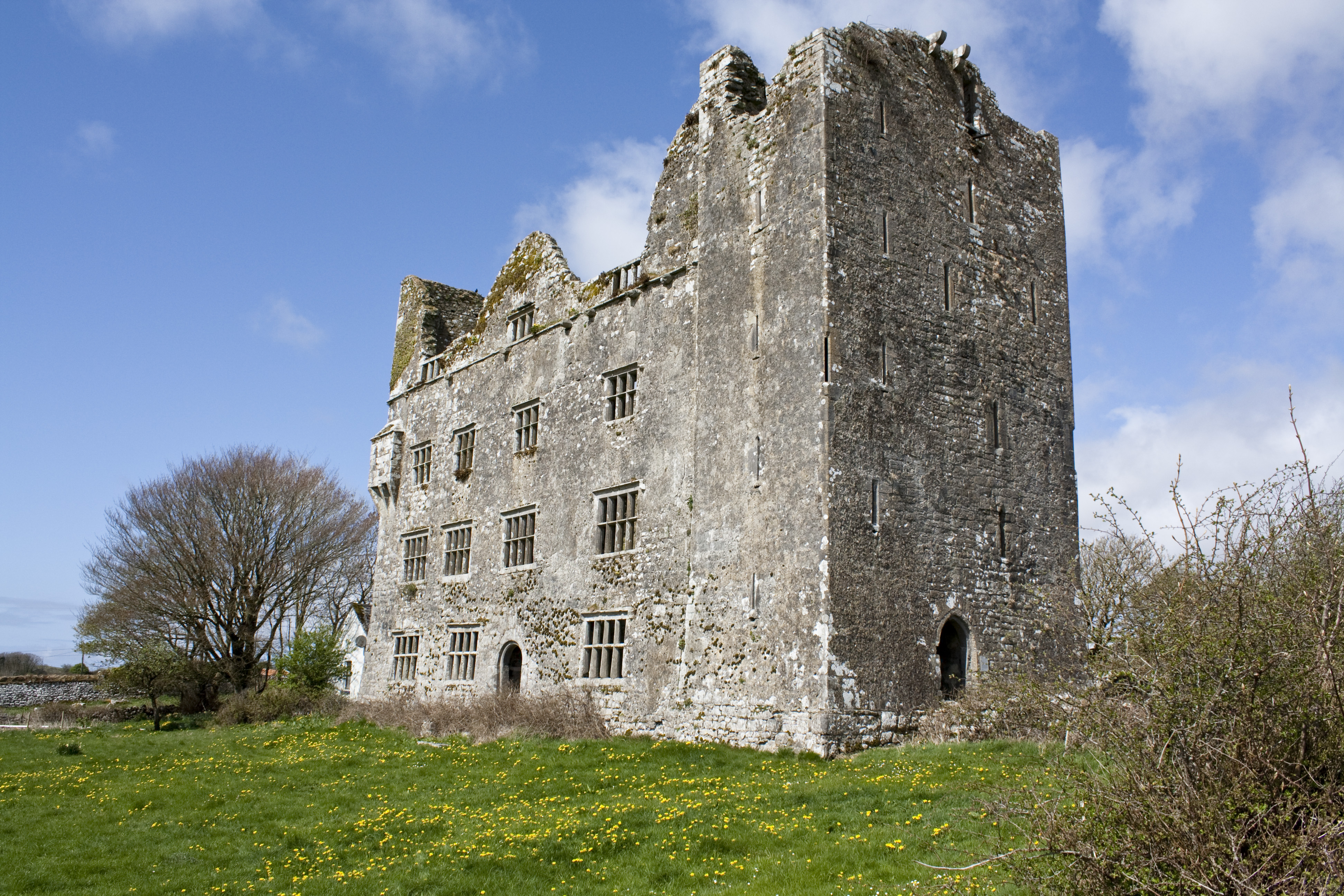
Leamaneh Castle ruins

It is with Leamaneh Castle that some of the stories of O'Brien's claimed violent actions are associated. It is alleged she would hang servants who displeased her, that she victimised trespassers, and denied rights of way through her land.

During the Confederate Wars in Ireland (1641–1653), her husband led and financed one of the five militia companies of Clare which raided tower houses of English settlers planted in the area during the preceding century. O'Brien is reported to have ridden with her husband during some raids. In depositions relating to the Irish Rebellion of 1641, a man named Gregory Hickman stated that: "Conor O’Brien, gentleman, in a most rebellious manner seized upon the deponent's corn"; and, later, "Conor O’Brien, of Lemaneagh, accompanied by Mary Brien [and others] with force of arms came to the deponent's house and took away fourteen English swine and a parcel of household stuff; also 400 sheep". Some of those raided by O'Brien reputedly perpetuated rumours that she was a witch.

Conor O'Brien was commissioned as Colonel of Horse in 1650 in the army of Charles II. He died the "death of a hero" in 1651 from wounds he received fighting against Edmund Ludlow at the pass of Inchecrogan. Some stories suggest that he was returned to Leamaneh by O'Brien's own troops, gravely wounded, and that she nursed her husband on his death bed. Other stories suggest that his body was returned by Cromwellian troops, and that, in order to avoid confiscation of her lands, she claimed that the dead man was not her husband and that she was already a widow. Lady Chatterton's account, in 1839, says that during the battle of the pass of Inchicronan, Henry Ireton sent five of his best men to shoot Conor O'Brien, and one of them succeeded in wounding him. Mary captured and hanged the man, called her sons and advised them to surrender to the Cromwellian forces, and set off in her coach to Limerick. Travelling through all the devastation and sorrow of his death, she arrived at the Limerick camp of Henry Ireton. Here, dressed in blue silk and lace, she reportedly proclaimed that she was willing to marry any of the officers. Some sources suggest that she made this offer as proof of her husband's death. In other sources it is suggested that she may have wanted to marry a Cromwellian officer in an effort of secure her property and land from seizure.

Some legends, described by antiquarian Thomas Johnson Westropp as "less credible" and an attempt to present O'Brien as a type of "female Blue Beard", propose that O'Brien married between 12 and 25 Cromwellian officers. Folklorist sources suggest that these numbers relate to love affairs had by O'Brien. These apocryphal stories claim that after every marriage or love affair, she killed each suitor, including killing one with a kick to the stomach. In one such legend O'Brien challenged a local man, with whom she had a dispute, to ride to the Cliffs of Moher on her wild blind stallion - with the expectation that he would be killed. The folklorist Máire MacNeill describes parallels between some of these stories, such as challenging suitors to ride a wild stallion, and those of traditional Irish sovereign-goddess myths. Other stories claim that O'Brien had hung servants, who had displeased her, from the corbels of the castle; the males by the neck and the woman by the hair, and would cut off their breasts.

According to historical texts, soon after her husband's death in battle, O'Brien petitioned Charles I's Lord Deputy in Ireland, Ulick Burke, to become the custodian of the O'Brien estate. She was able to secure the land for her children, but she could not retain Leamaneh Castle, which fell to the Cromwellian army and was turned into a garrison.

== Later life ==
By 1653, Máire Rua O'Brien (then Cooper) is recorded as the wife of a former Cromwellian officer, Cornet John Cooper and was living with him in Limerick for a period after their marriage. She later stayed with her O'Brien cousins in Inchiquin Castle, before returning to Leamaneh during the Restoration. Cooper and O'Brien are believed to have had a son, Harry, and possibly a daughter. It is Cooper that O'Brien was alleged to have killed with a kick in the stomach, but sources show that they remained married until her death - although they most likely lived apart.

Still an Irish Catholic but attending English Protestant mass, O'Brien reputedly had a dispute with the local rector, which resulted in her building Coad Church. For the rest of her life she reputedly attended Mass at this church. Legend suggests that she did this to upset the vicar and to show she could do what she liked. In her will, O'Brien left a large amount of money to both Ennis Abbey and Quinn Abbey.

In 1662, O'Brien was indicted for the murder of a local English landlord, which related to her apparent involvement with her second husband's raiding parties during the early 1640s. These allegations were reputedly made by her cousins' political opponents in parliament. Although she received a royal pardon in 1664, the trial went ahead and she wrote in 1665 of her "extremitie & troubles in England".

Her son, Donough, moved the O'Brien family seat to Dromoland Castle in the 1680s, where she lived the final years of her life.

== Death and subsequent legends ==
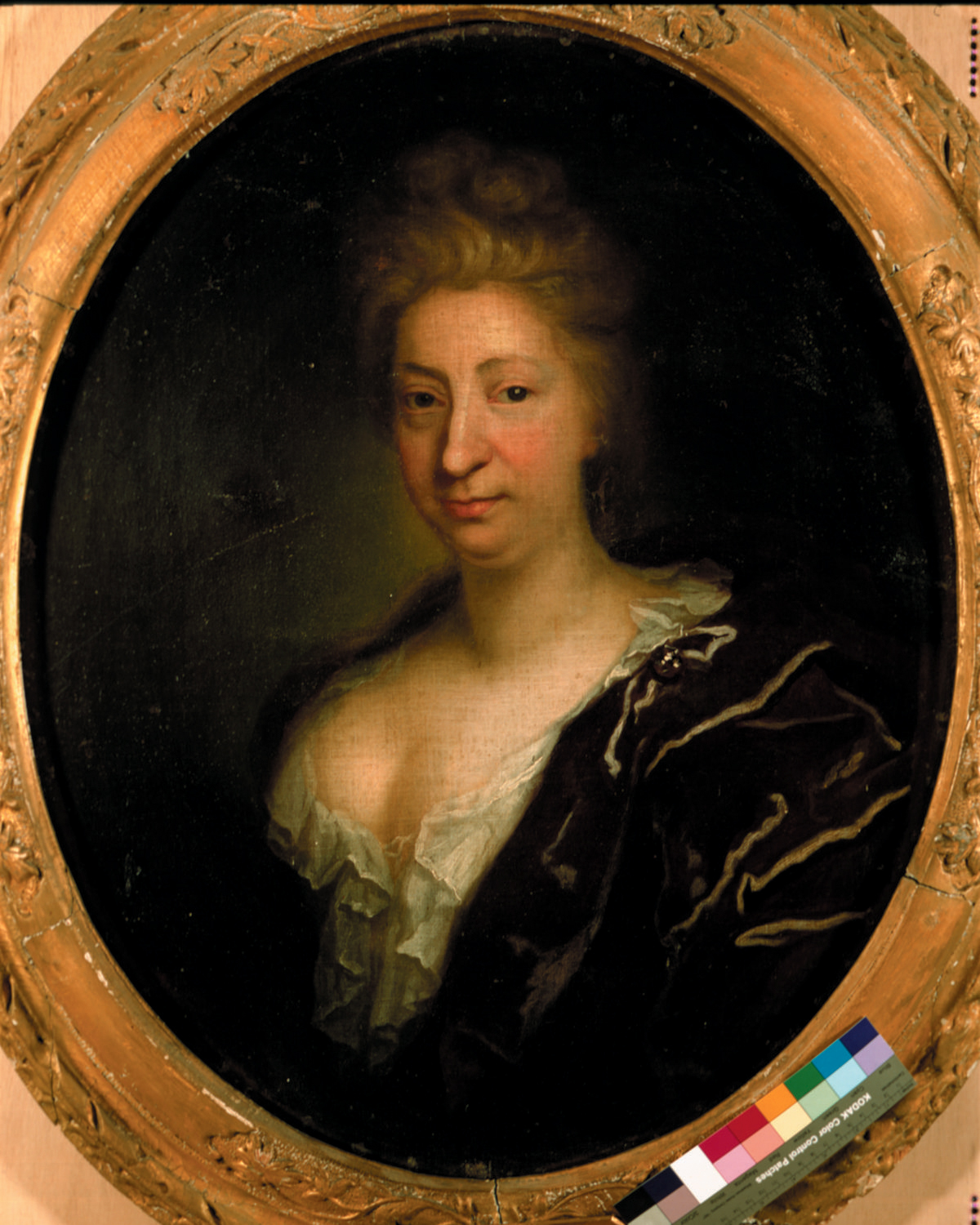
17th century portrait, from the Dromoland Castle collection, reputed to be of Máire Rua O'Brien

O'Brien is reported to have died an extraordinary death, with one legend stating that she was sealed into a hollow tree in the avenue of Carnelly Forest. Other legends state that she was flung from a horse into a forked branch of a tree where she choked, or hung by her own hair from a tree.

In the Dictionary of Irish Biography, the entry for O'Brien records her death as "conventional", and that "in poor health" in her seventies she made a will. Signed on 7 June 1686, her will requested that she be buried at the abbey of Ennis, and though there is no marker, it is possible she is buried there alongside her second husband, Conor O'Brien. Others contend that she is buried at Coad Church in Kilnaboy parish, with two of her daughters.

Folklore and legends claim that Lemenagh Castle is one of the most haunted castle ruins in Ireland, with O'Brien's ghost wandering the halls of the ruin, accompanied by the sounds of an evil laugh and the screams of her supposed victims.

There are three known portraits of O'Brien, one held by the O'Brien family, and two in Dromoland Castle Hotel. The jewellery worn by O'Brien in one of these portraits, dating from the 1640s, includes a "curious" mermaid-shaped pendant.

A slip jig titled Mall Rua, and associated with Máire Rua O'Brien, was cataloged in 1976 by Breandán Breathnach.
