= Doonbeg River =

River in County Clare, Ireland

Coordinates: 52°43′53″N 9°31′25″W

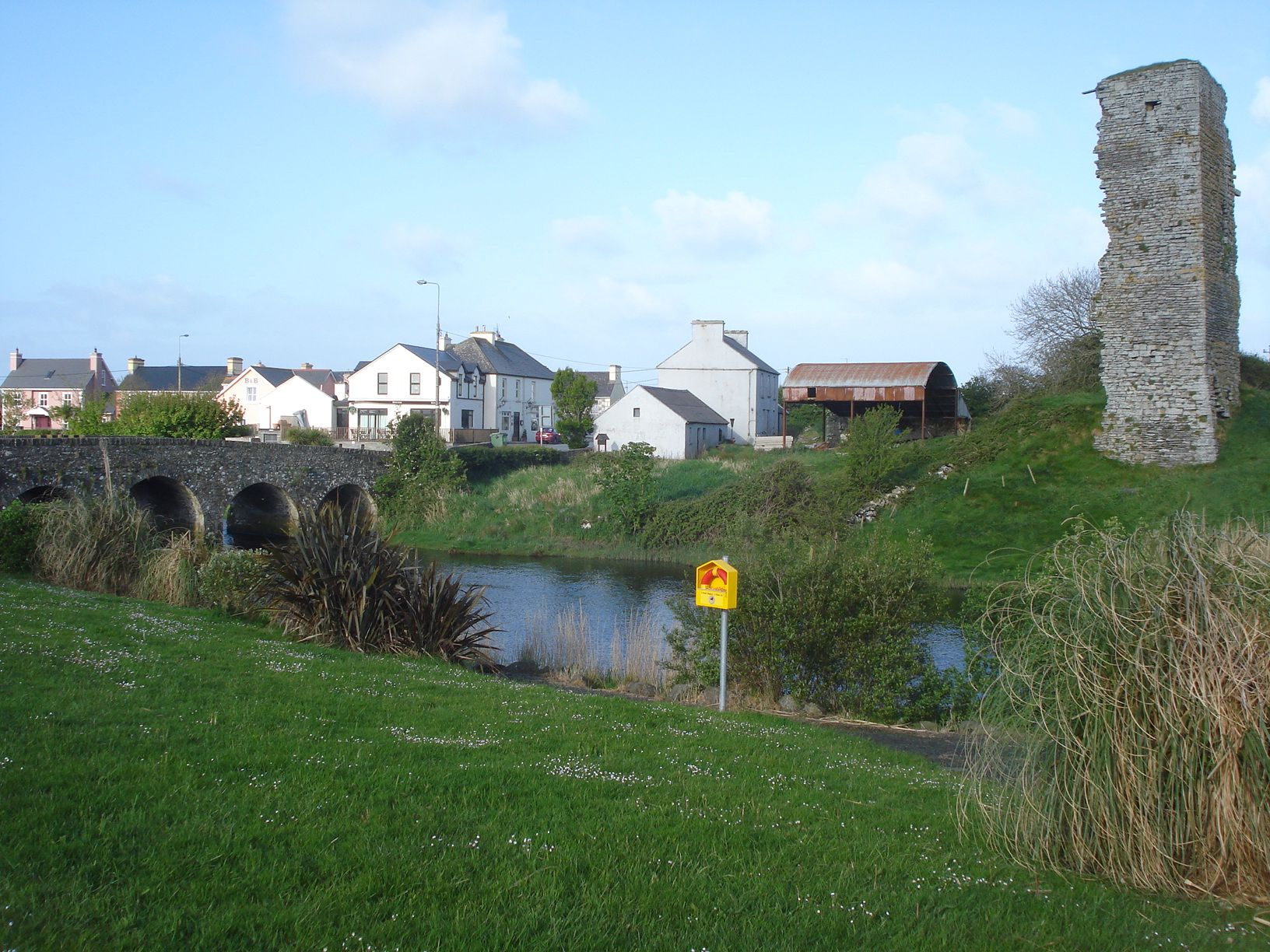
The river at Doonbeg Bridge

The Doonbeg (Irish: Abhainn an Dúin Bhig) is a river of County Clare, western Ireland. Its source is near Kilmaley, and it flows southward for about 7 miles before turning northwestward for about 15 miles and passing Cooraclare before flowing into the sea at Doonbeg. At Doonbeg village the N67 road crosses the river on a seven-arched stone bridge. On 20 September 1588, one of the ships of the Spanish Armada, the San Estaban, was wrecked near the mouth of Doonbeg.
