= Jean Baptiste Molinari =

French head chef

- Born: 25 April
- Occupation: Head chef
- Known for: Michelin starred Dromoland Castle
- Successor: David McCann

Jean Baptiste Molinari (born 25 April) is a French head chef, who worked as an executive chef at Dromoland Castle in Newmarket-on-Fergus, County Clare, Ireland, and now is chef de cuisine at Compass Group, a British food contracting service. He won a Michelin star in 1995.

== Biography ==
Molinari was born into a culinary family: his grandfather worked in the kitchens of Auguste Escoffier, and his father was also a well-known chef, who worked, amongst others, in England and Scotland. Molinari started his career in Hôtel de Paris Monte-Carlo in Monaco, where he was quickly promoted from 3rd commis chef to chef de partie. There he was selected by head chef Alain Ducasse for a promotion to chef de cuisine in Ireland. In 1988, he moved to Dromoland Castle, working his way up the ranks to executive chef/head chef. In that capacity he earned the Michelin star for 1995.

In 1995, Molinari left Dromoland Castle and moved to the Beau-Rivage Hotel in Neuchâtel, Switzerland. He stayed here until 2012, when he moved to Mader SA to work as pâtissier and traiteur. In 2013, he moved to his present job as chef de cuisine at Compass Group (Suisse) SA.

During his time in Dromoland Castle, "Lobster Fricassee" was his speciality dish.

Molinari was featured in two episodes of the World Class Cuisine TV series. In one episode he made "Brown-Bread Souffle", in the other episode "Lobster with cabbage".

== Awards ==
- Michelin star: 1995.
