= Kilmacduane =

Civil parish in County Clare, Ireland

Kilmacduane Cill Mhic an Duáin
- Civil parish
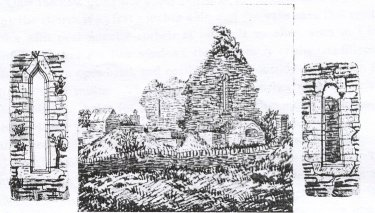
- Kilmacduan church in 1903 (with the east and south windows)

- Location in Ireland
- Coordinates: 52.704247°N 9.417699°W
- Country: Ireland
- Province: Munster
- County: County Clare
- Time zone: UTC+0 (WET)
  - Summer (DST): UTC-1 (IST (WEST))

Kilmacduane (Irish: Cill Mhic an Duáin) is a civil parish in County Clare, Ireland. It contains the villages of Cooraclare and Cree.

== Location ==
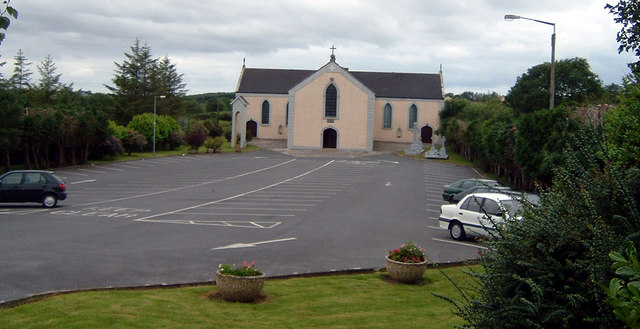
Church of Cooraclare in 2004

The civil parish of Kilmacduane is in the barony of Moyarta. It is 5.75 miles (9.25 km) northeast of Kilrush on the road to Miltown-Malbay. In 1837 the parish held 9735 statute acres as applotted under the tithe act, much of it being hilly pasture and bog. The civil parish contains the village of Cooraclare.

In 1837 the parish was part of the Church of Ireland union of Kilmurry-Clonderlaw. It was part of the Catholic union of Kilmihil, with chapels at Cooreclare and Creegh. In 1848 the Catholic parish of Cooraclare (Kilmacduane) was once again separated from Kilmihil.

== Former church ==
Kilmacduane means "church of the son of Duain". "Kilmadayn" is recorded in the Papal Taxation in 1302. In 1903 the ruined church of Kilmacduan was still standing. The ruined church was built in the 11th or early 12th century, and was remodeled or perhaps rebuilt around 1480 at a time when churches were being restored across Limerick and Clare. The church is on a small hillock in a green valley overlooking a stream. The coign stones at the churches angles have been removed, and it is said they were used for the Cooraclare chapel.

== Townlands ==
The parish contains the townlands of Acres, Alva, Aughagarna, Ballynagun East, Ballynagun West, Brisla East, Brisla West, Caheraghacullin, Caherfeenick North, Caherfeenick South, Carrow, Cloghaun Beg East, Cloghaun Beg West, Cloghaun More East, Cloghaun More West, Clooncullin, Clooneenagh, Cloonreddan, Cloonwhite North, Cloonwhite South, Creegh North, Creegh South, Dangananella East, Dangananella West, Drumellihy Cunningham, Drumellihy Mac Donnell, Drumellihy Westby, Drumellihy Westropp, Garraunnatooha, Gower North, Gower South, Kilmacduane East, Kilmacduane West, Teernagloghane, Tullabrack East and Tullabrack West.
