= Patrick Kelly (fiddler) =

- Born: 1905
- Origin: Cree, County Clare, Ireland
- Died: 1976 (aged 70–71)
- Genres: Traditional Irish
- Instrument: fiddle

Patrick Kelly (1905–1976) was an Irish fiddle-player and teacher.

Kelly was born in Cree, County Clare, and learned to play when he was young. His youth were the heyday of the American Wakes and the house dances. His style was influenced by the Kerry fiddler George Whelan (also the mentor of his father) and Danny Mescal. Both acted as his teachers and mentors.

== Style ==
Patrick Kelly specialized in music set in 12/8 pieces. While teaching in Cree and surroundings, he also passed on the Foxhunters Reel.

Characteristic of Kelly was the tuning of his fiddle in GDGD, so he could use droning and double stopping.

== Personal ==
Patrick Kelly was the only child of Tim Kelly and Maria Killeen (1863–1951).

Around 1930, Kelly married Margaret "Dilly" Golden from Cree. They had seven children.

== Discography ==
- Ceol an Clair, Vol. I (CCÉ CL 17) - along with Junior Crehan, Bobby Casey, Joe Ryan, and John Kelly which was recorded by Seamus Mac Mathuna.
- Pat Kelly (Custy Music) - recorded in the 1960s and restored by his son.
