= Cree, County Clare =

Village in County Clare, Ireland

Cree An Chríoch
- Village
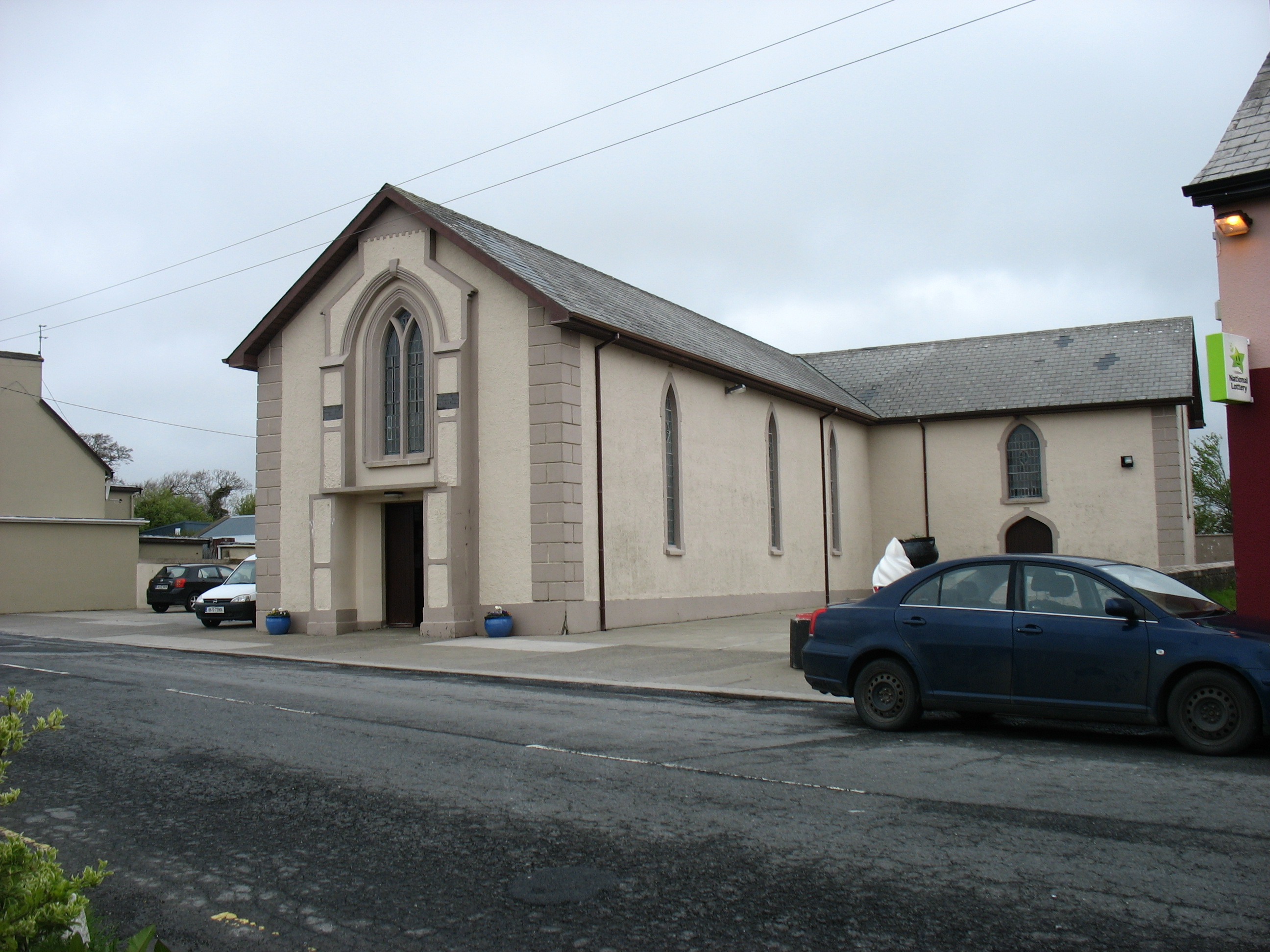
- St. Mary's Church

- Location in Ireland
- Coordinates: 52°44′45.36″N 9°25′51.76″W
- Country: Ireland
- Province: Munster
- County: County Clare
- Time zone: UTC+0 (WET)
  - Summer (DST): UTC-1 (IST (WEST))

Cree or Creegh (Irish: An Chríoch) is a small village in County Clare in Ireland. It is situated at a crossroads near the villages of Doonbeg and Cooraclare in the west of the county. The nearest large towns are Kilrush and Ennis which are 7 and 26 miles (11 and 42 km) away respectively. In Dromheilly Cree there is a shrine which August has a week of masses. Cree is in the ecclesiastical parish of Cree/Cooraclare parish and in the Roman Catholic Diocese of Killaloe. Nearby villages and small towns include Cooraclare, Doonbeg, Mullagh, Quilty, Kilmihil, Kilkee and Milltown Malbay.

== History ==
In the 15th and 16th centuries, the land in County Clare was divided into baronies. Cree comes from the Irish word Críoch, meaning 'the end', which was because the village was situated at the border of the barony of Ibrickane with the neighbouring barony of Corca Bhaiscin.

== Amenities ==
Serving the area is a Catholic church (Saint Mary's) one public house, a fast food restaurant, two primary schools (Cree and Clohanbeg closed in 2023), a preschool, a community centre, a garage, a hair and beauty business and a shop/deli. Clean Ireland Recycling's headquarters are located in Cree. There are several guest houses and bed & breakfast located in Cree and vicinity.

== Geography ==
Most of the people living around Cree are involved in agriculture and the majority of the land is used for dairy farming. The Creegh River flows through the village and enters the Atlantic Ocean at Doughmore Bay near Doonbeg.

== People ==
- Patrick Kelly (1905–1976), fiddle player
- Patrick Kelly (1875–1934), politician, was born in nearby Clonina

== See also ==
- List of towns and villages in Ireland
