= Boetius Clancy =

16th century Irish landowner and politician

Boetius Clancy or MacClancy (died April 1598) was a 16th-century Irish landowner, MP and High Sheriff.

He was born in Co Clare, the son of Hugh Clancy, and was the great-grandson of Murtagh MacClancy of Cnoc-Finn (Knockfin). The MacClancy family were the hereditary lawyers or brehons of Thomond. Boetius was well educated and fluent in Latin and English. He inherited and lived at the family seat, the castle at Knockfin, near the famous law school in the parish of Killilagh in County Clare.

In 1585 he was the representative of the newly formed County Clare in the Parliament of Ireland and in 1588 appointed High Sheriff of Clare.

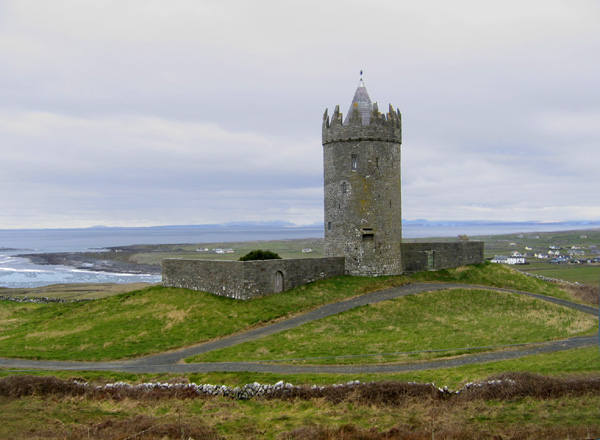
Doonagore Castle

In that year (1588) the Spanish Armada was trying to make its way home through severe storms off the west coast of Ireland and many ships were wrecked or abandoned. Clancy had been advised by William Fitzwilliam, the Lord Deputy that "… we authorise you to make inquiry by all good means, both by oath and otherwise, to take all the hulls of ships, stores, treasures, etc. into your hands and to apprehend and execute all Spaniards found there of what quality so ever. Torture may be used in prosecuting this inquiry". In September two large galleons, the San Marcos and the San Esteban, were wrecked on the Clare coast. A reported 170 (or 70) Spanish crew survived but were promptly rounded up and imprisoned on Clancy's orders. They were subsequently tortured and hanged on a nearby hill not far from Doonagore Castle now known as Cnoc na Crocaire, or Hangman's Hill and the bodies buried in a mass grave nearby. Clancy also either managed to salvage from the wreck an elaborately carved table or had it manufactured from some of the wreck's timbers. It is now known as the Armada table and kept on show at Bunratty Castle.

He married Margaret, daughter of Donough O'Brien.

He died April, 1598, leaving a son, Murtough Clancy.
