= Tom Morrissey (Gaelic footballer) =

Irish Gaelic footballer

Personal information
- Born: County Clare, Ireland
- Height: 6 ft 3 in (191 cm)

Sport
- Sport: Gaelic football
- Position: -Midfield
Club
- Years: Club
- Cooraclare
Inter-county
- Years: County
- 1992-199?: Clare
Inter-county titles
- Munster titles: 1

Tom Morrissey was a Gaelic footballer from Cooraclare County Clare. He won a Munster Senior Football Championship in 1992 when Clare had a surprise win over Kerry in the final. He won McGrath Cup medals in 1994 and 1995.

== Honours ==
- Munster Senior Football Championship (1) 1992
- McGrath Cup (3) 1992 1994 1995
- National Football League Division 2 (2) 1992 1995
