= Cooraclare =

Village in County Clare, Ireland

Cooraclare Cuar an Chláir
- Village
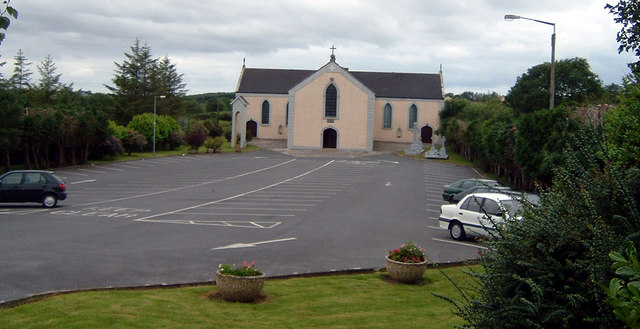
- St Senan's church, Cooraclare

- Location in Ireland
- Coordinates: 52°42′14″N 9°25′06″W
- Country: Ireland
- Province: Munster
- County: County Clare
- Elevation: 18 m (59 ft)
- Time zone: UTC+0 (WET)
  - Summer (DST): UTC-1 (IST (WEST))
- Irish Grid Reference: R014627

Cooraclare (Irish: Cuar an Chláir, meaning 'recess of the plain') is a village near Kilrush, in County Clare, Ireland, and a Catholic parish by the same name.

== Location ==
The village of Cooraclare is in the parish of Cooraclare (Kilmacduane) in the Roman Catholic Diocese of Killaloe. It is 10 kilometres (6.2 mi) from Kilrush on the road from Kilrush to Miltown Malbay. The old name for the parish is Kilmacduane, which was joined for a while to the parish of Kilmihil. In 1848 the two were again separated and Cooraclare took its present name. The parish includes the village of Cree, at times spelled Creegh.

The parish has two churches, St Senan's in Cooraclare and St Mary's in Cree.

Cooraclare lies on the River Doonbeg.

== Sport and culture ==
Cooraclare have won the Clare Senior Football Championship in 1915, 1917, 1918, 1925, 1944, 1956, 1964, 1965, 1986 and 1997, and also hosts the Rose of Clare Festival every year in August since 1979. The Cooraclare Rose has won the contest in 1987, 1992, 2004, 2015 and 2024

A song associated with Cooraclare is entitled "The Chapel Gate of Cooraclare".

== Notable people ==
Historical population
Year	Pop.	±%
1831	140	—
1841	178	+27.1%
1851	167	−6.2%
1861	201	+20.4%
1871	171	−14.9%
1881	163	−4.7%
1891	152	−6.7%
1901	125	−17.8%
1911	111	−11.2%
1926	80	−27.9%
1936	86	+7.5%
1946	98	+14.0%
1951	104	+6.1%
1956	112	+7.7%
1961	94	−16.1%
1966	91	−3.2%

Famous natives or residents include:

- Brendan Daly, politician and government minister
- Seán Kinsella, chef who was born in Cooraclare
- Mick Lillis, Gaelic footballer for Laois and, later, manager
- Tom Morrissey, Gaelic footballer for Clare
- The D'Arcys Brothers, who were active in the War of Independence. In 2023 a monument was erected to their memory by their nephew Brendan Daly in Cooraclare Village which is known as "D'Arcy's Remembered"
  - Michael D'Arcy who died age 22 at Poulmore Cooraclare whilst taking part in an ambush of the Cooraclare RIC.
  - Patrick D'Arcy who was an active Volunteer and later executed aged 25 in nearby Doonbeg.
  - Jack D'Arcy who was sentenced to death but evaded British custody en route to Limerick Gaol. During the Civil War Jack D'Arcy was captured again and awaiting a death sentence at Limerick Prison, however he along with 30 of his IRA comrades escaped Limerick Prison via digging an escape tunnel in the launderette section of Limerick prison. This tunnel took a week to dig and finally when complete they realised they had just tunneled their way into the nearby St. John of God's Mental Hospital. Nonetheless they escaped the grounds of the hospital with relative ease.

== See also ==
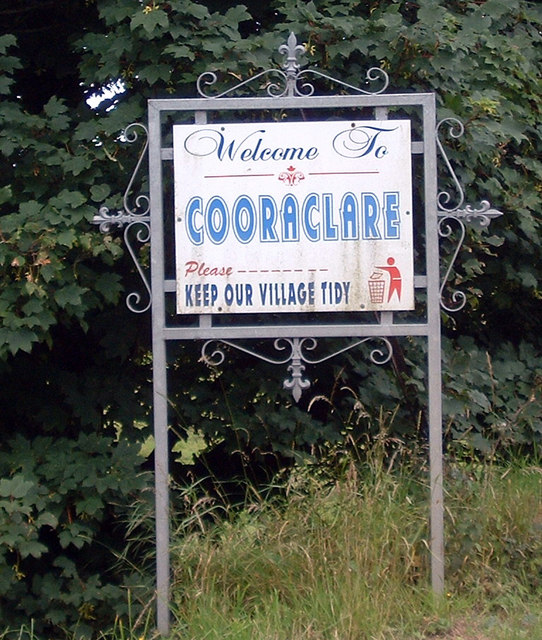
Village sign

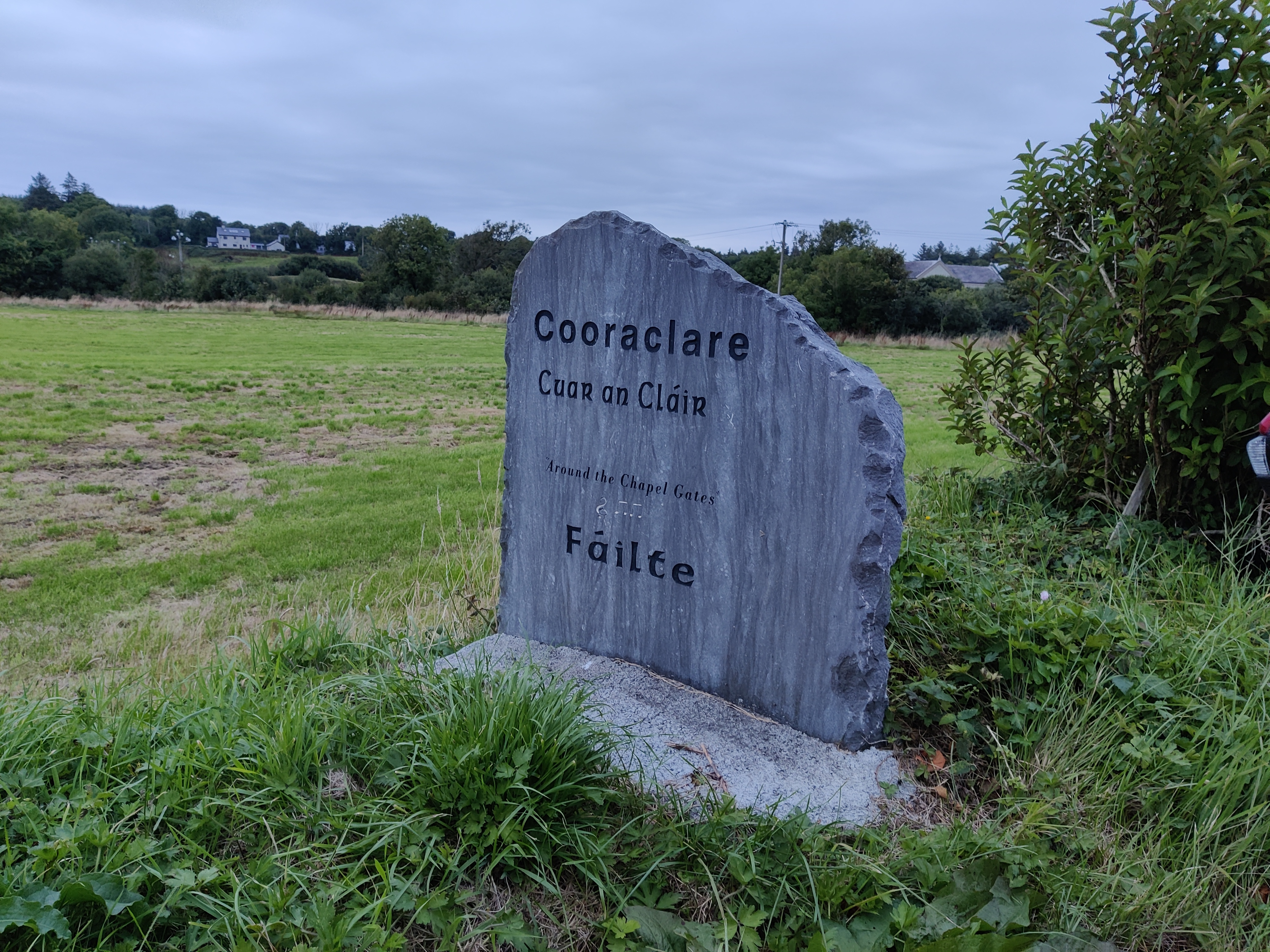
Cooraclare village sign

- List of towns and villages in Ireland
