= Leamaneh Castle =

Castle in County Clare, Ireland

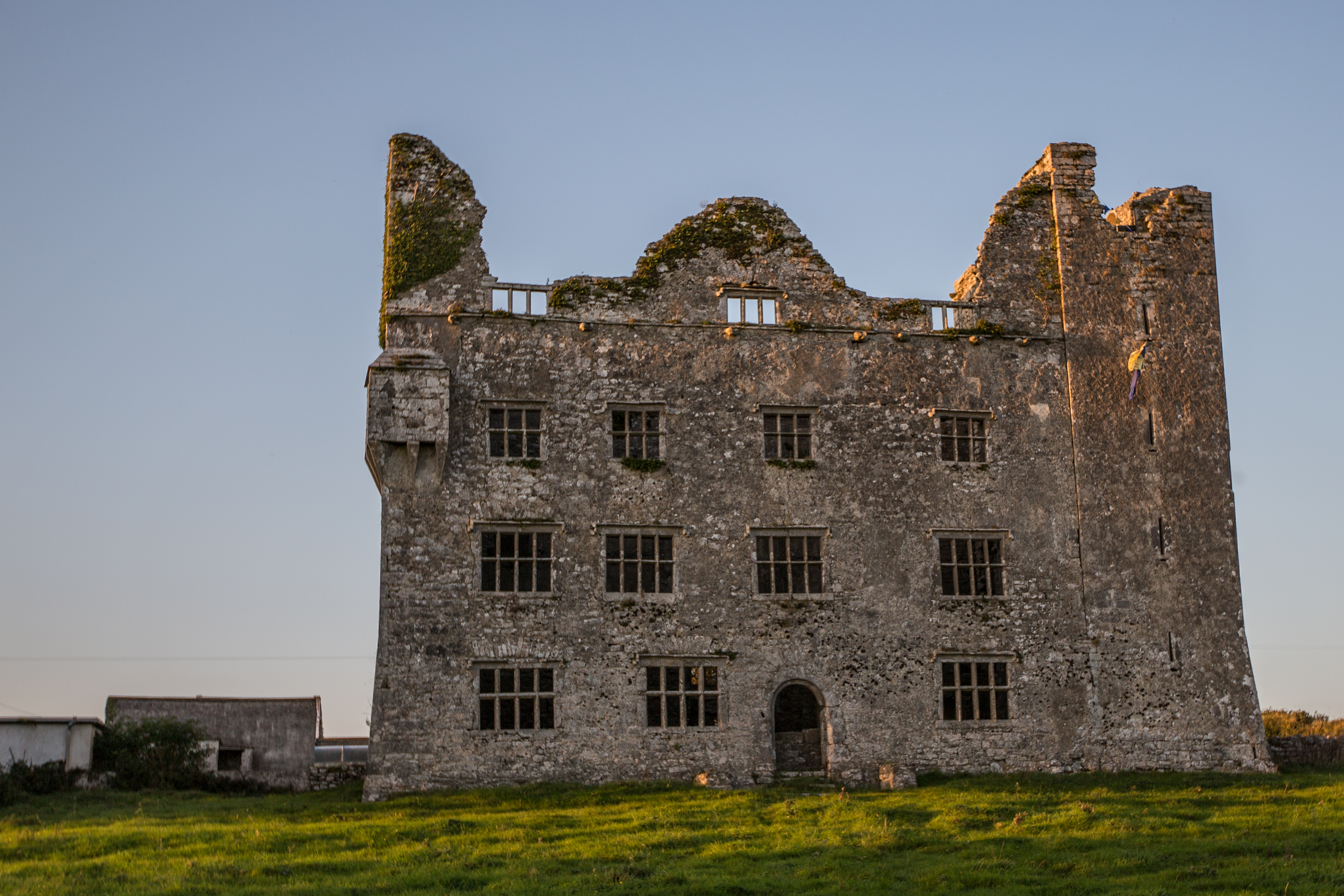
- The ruins of Leamaneh Castle

- Location within Ireland
- 52°59′15.32″N 9°8′24.95″W
- Location: County Clare, Ireland

History
- Built: c. 1480-90 tower house c. 1650 mansion

National monument of Ireland
- Reference no.: 448

Leamaneh Castle is a ruined castle located in the townland of Leamaneh North, parish of Kilnaboy, between the villages of Corofin and Kilfenora at the border of the region known as the Burren in County Clare, Ireland. It consists of a 15th-century tower house and a 17th-century mansion.

== Name ==
The castle's name "Leamaneh" is believed to be derived from the Irish léim an éich which, when translated into English means "the horse's leap" or léim an fheidh ("the deer's leap"). It is also sometimes spelled "Lemeneagh Castle".

== Location ==
The castle is located at an important local crossroads and the place where the Baronies of Burren, Corcomroe and Inchiquin met. Today the road R476 from Kilfenora to Kilnaboy village and the R480 north to Ballyvaughan intersect there.

== History ==
=== Early structure ===
The castle was originally a basic, 5-storied Irish tower house which was built c. 1480 – c. 1490, probably by Toirdhealbhach Donn Ó Briain of the O'Brien family, one of the last of the High Kings of Ireland and a direct descendant of Brian Boru.

In 1543, Turlough Donn's son, Murrough surrendered his title of King to Henry VIII and, in return, was created the 1st Earl of Thomond and Baron Inchiquin. In 1550, Murrough gave Leamaneh to his third son, Donough. Donough was hanged in Limerick in 1582 as a rebel.

=== Manor house ===
In 1639, Donough's grandson, Conor O'Brien married Máire Nic Mhathúna (MacMahon). She became one of the most famous women in Irish folklore who, due to her flaming red hair, was commonly known as Máire Rua ("Red Mary"). She was born in 1615 or 1616. Her father was Sir Torlach Rua MacMahon, Lord of Clonderlaw and her mother was Lady Mary O'Brien, daughter of the third Earl of Thomond. Her first husband, Daniel O'Neylan (also sometimes written O'Neillan or Neylan) of Dysert O'Dea Castle in north Clare died young and upon his death, she gained control of his substantial estate and a £1,000 fortune. This wealth enabled her and Conor to build a more comfortable mansion on to the tower house.

Part of the tower house was demolished and replaced by a 4-storied mansion around 1648. Máire accompanied her husband on raids against English settlers. In 1651, he was mortally wounded fighting on the Royalists' side at Inchicronan (Crusheen). Reportedly, immediately after her husband's death, the widow, realizing that the punishment for his rebellion against the English would be the forfeiture of their property, drove to Limerick and offered to marry any Cromwellian officer who would take her hand. (This is refuted in other versions of the story which state that Máire Rua didn't marry until 1653, two years after Conor's death.)

General Ludlow, who commanded the English Parliament forces at Inchicronan subsequently conducted counter-insurgency operations in the Burren, making his well-known statement about the area's barrenness. He went on to say about Leamaneh "and finding it indifferent strong, being built with stone and having a good wall about it, we put a garrison into it and furnished it with all things necessary".

Máire Rua's third husband, Cornet John Cooper was a Cromwellian soldier and through this marriage she successfully retained her estates. Cooper left the army and amassed some wealth through land and property speculation. However, he later ran into financial difficulty and, as a result, the estate which he had married into at Leamaneh, which he under law now owned through his wife, was mortgaged to repay his debts.

In the 1660s, Cromwellian troops were stationed on and off at Leamaneh. Máire Rua's son, Donagh or Donough (after 1686 Sir Donat) found the tower and manor damaged but stayed there until 1684/1685, when he moved the family seat from Leamaneh to the much larger Dromoland Castle in Newmarket-on-Fergus, south of Ennis.

Although Máire Rua's children from her first marriage to Daniel O'Neylan (or O'Neillan) were raised Catholic, Sir Donagh/Donat was brought up as a Protestant and eventually became the "richest commoner in Ireland." He built "Sir Donat's Road", connecting Killnaboy and Leamaneh, a toll road, the flanking stone walls of which are still visible in places. The gate houses at which tolls were collected have since been demolished.

He served as Sheriff of Clare in 1690 and as MP for County Clare from 1695 to 1713. He died in 1717. By 1678, the estate had been increased to over 10,000 acres of land.

=== Recent past ===
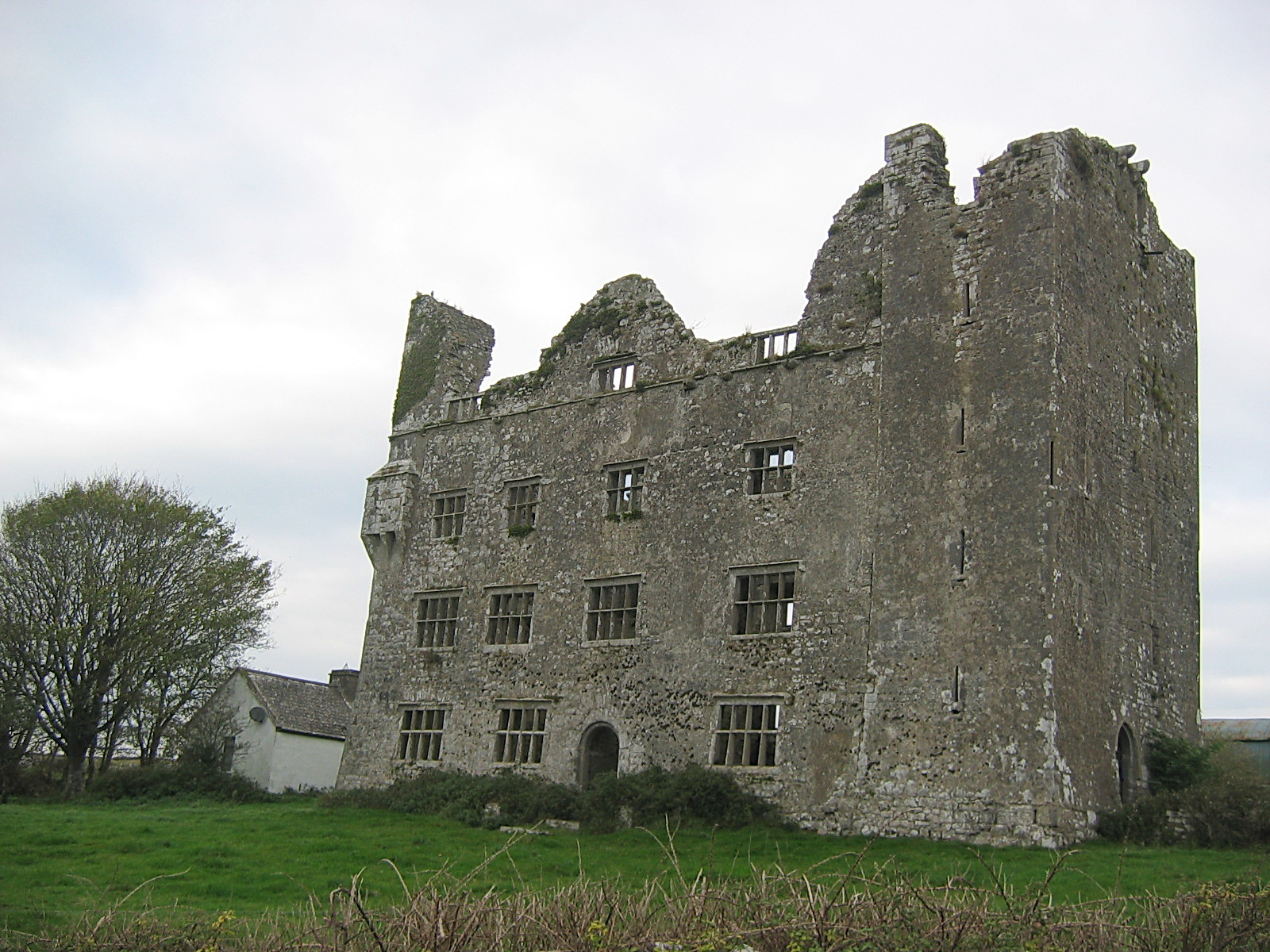
Three-quarter view of the castle

Leamaneh had various occupants in subsequent years. However, the house finally fell into ruin at the end of the 18th century. The barbican-like gates which adorned the entrance to the property were moved to Dromoland Castle in 1906 or 1908 by Lord Inchiquin. They are still there.

The most elegant of the fireplaces was relocated to the Old Ground Hotel in Ennis.

== Today ==
Today, the ruins include both the tower house with its arrow slits (or "loops") and the four walls of the adjoining manor house with their mullioned and transomed windows. The latter features a Trompe-l'œil effect, as the windows of the upper floors are smaller, creating an illusion of greater height. Some of the remains of the outbuildings and the walled gardens/deer park can still be seen. Unlike many of the castles in Ireland, Leamaneh is unmaintained and due to its poor state of repair not accessible. It is located on privately owned land and the area is used for farming.
