= Donough O'Brien (died 1582) =

Irish peer

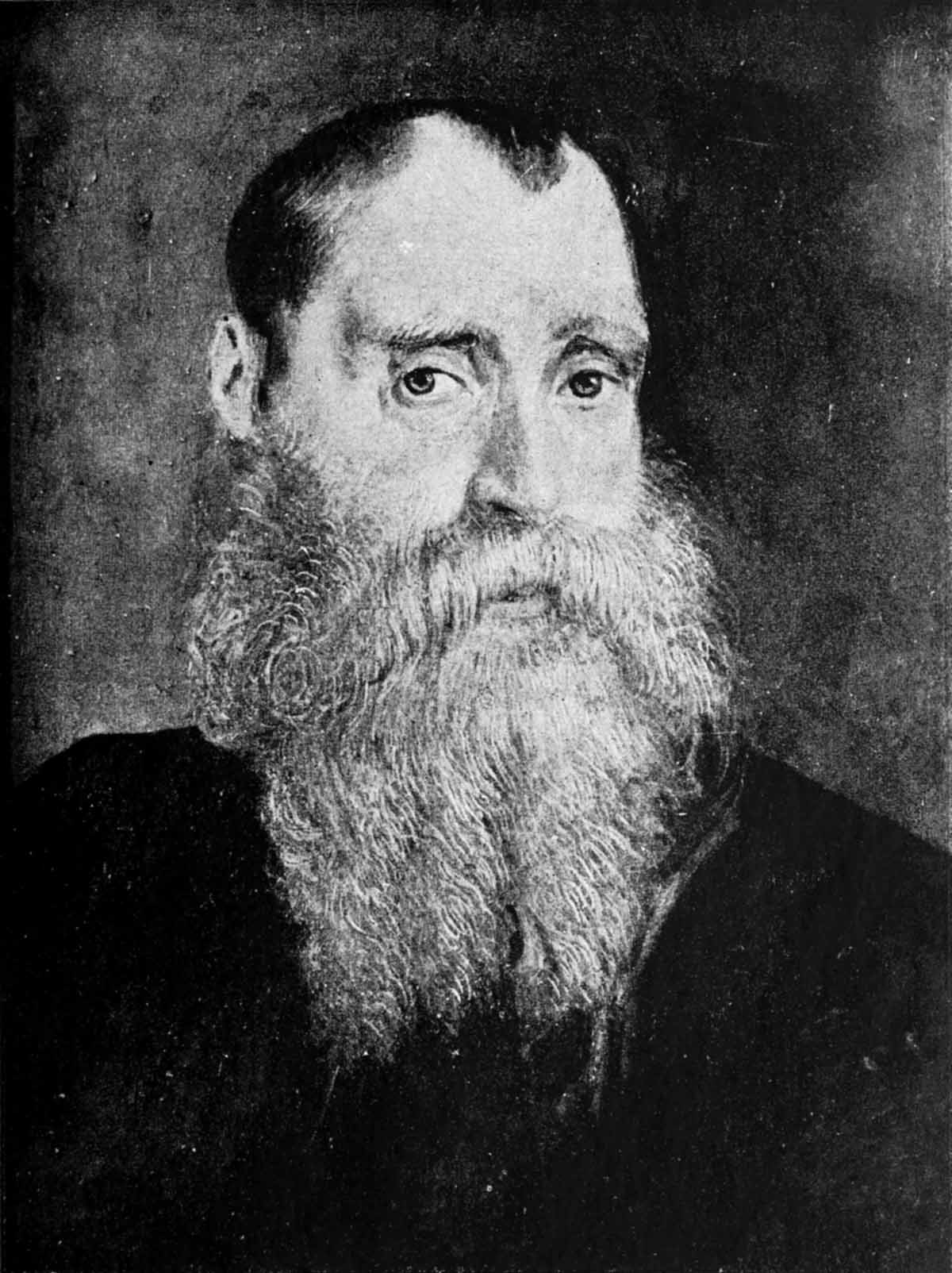
- Portrait of Donough, painted in 1577 on panel
- Born: c. 1525; Kingdom of Thomond, Ireland
- Died: 29 September 1582; Gates of Limerick
- Spouse(s): Slaney McNamara
- Issue: Conor O'Brien; Margaret O'Brien; Fenoli O'Brien
- Father: Murrough O'Brien, 1st Earl of Thomond
- Mother: Eleanor FitzGerald

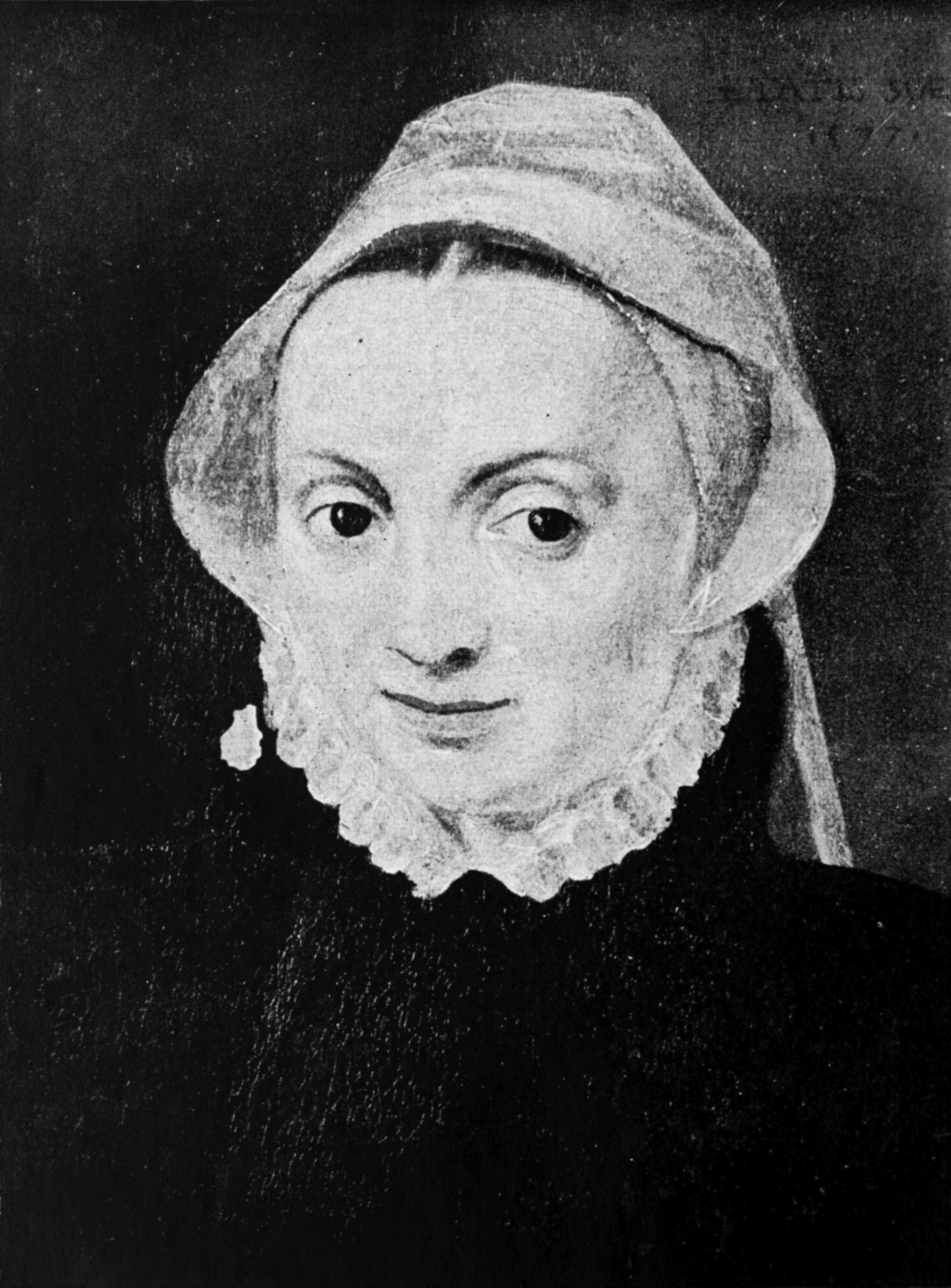
Slaney O'Brien (née McNamara), wife of Donough

Donough O'Brien (Irish: Donnchadh Ó Briain) (died 29 September 1582) was the third son of Murrough O'Brien and the ancestor of the Leameneagh branch of that family.

== Holdings ==
He was granted Leameneh, Dromoland, Ballyconneely, Cowillreough, Clonemonhyl and the lands belonging to the Abbey of Corcomroe by his father upon his return from England in 1543.

== Death ==
He joined the sons of the Earl of Clanricarde in rebellion in 1580 and was hanged and attainted of treason in September 1582, having surrendered under a letter of protection which was deemed faulty.

The annals state in 1582:
"Donough, the son of Murrough, son of Turlough, son of Teige, son of Turlough, who was son of Brian Chatha-an-Aenaigh O'Brien, was put to death in an ignoble manner, that is, he was hanged in Thomond by Captain Mortant, who was Marshal in the country, and by the Sheriff, Sir George, the son of Thomas Cusack. The year before he had formed a league with the sons of the Earl of Clanrickard, but, having repented, he returned back under protection. The others detected a flaw and a defect in the form of the protection, so that they seized on Donough, and hanged him, as we have before stated, in the gateway of Limerick, on the 29th of September, which fell on Friday. His body was conveyed to his native territory, and interred at Ennis."

The Lemeneagh and Dromoland estates were not forfeited and were restored to the family, upon confirmation forthcoming that the warrant for Donough's execution was faulty, and his hanging had taken place by an error. The letter of protection had been in order. (Note: see page 200 of "History of the O'Briens from Brian Boroimhe, AD. 1000 to AD. 1945")

Donough was buried in the monastery at Ennis, and the Queen's pardon was eventually granted for the benefit of his heirs. (Note: see page 201 of "History of the O'Briens from Brian Boroimhe, AD. 1000 to AD. 1945")

== Family ==
He married Slaney McNamara (born 1549), daughter of John McNamara of Cratelagh, chief of his name, and had issue:

- Conor O'Brien
- Margaret, married Boetius Clancy
- Fenoli, married Owney O'Laughlin of Moyrin, County Clare (Note: see page 202 of "History of the O'Briens from Brian Boroimhe, AD. 1000 to AD. 1945")
