= Dromoland Castle =

Castle in Ireland

Coordinates: 52°46′59.71″N 8°54′21.5″W

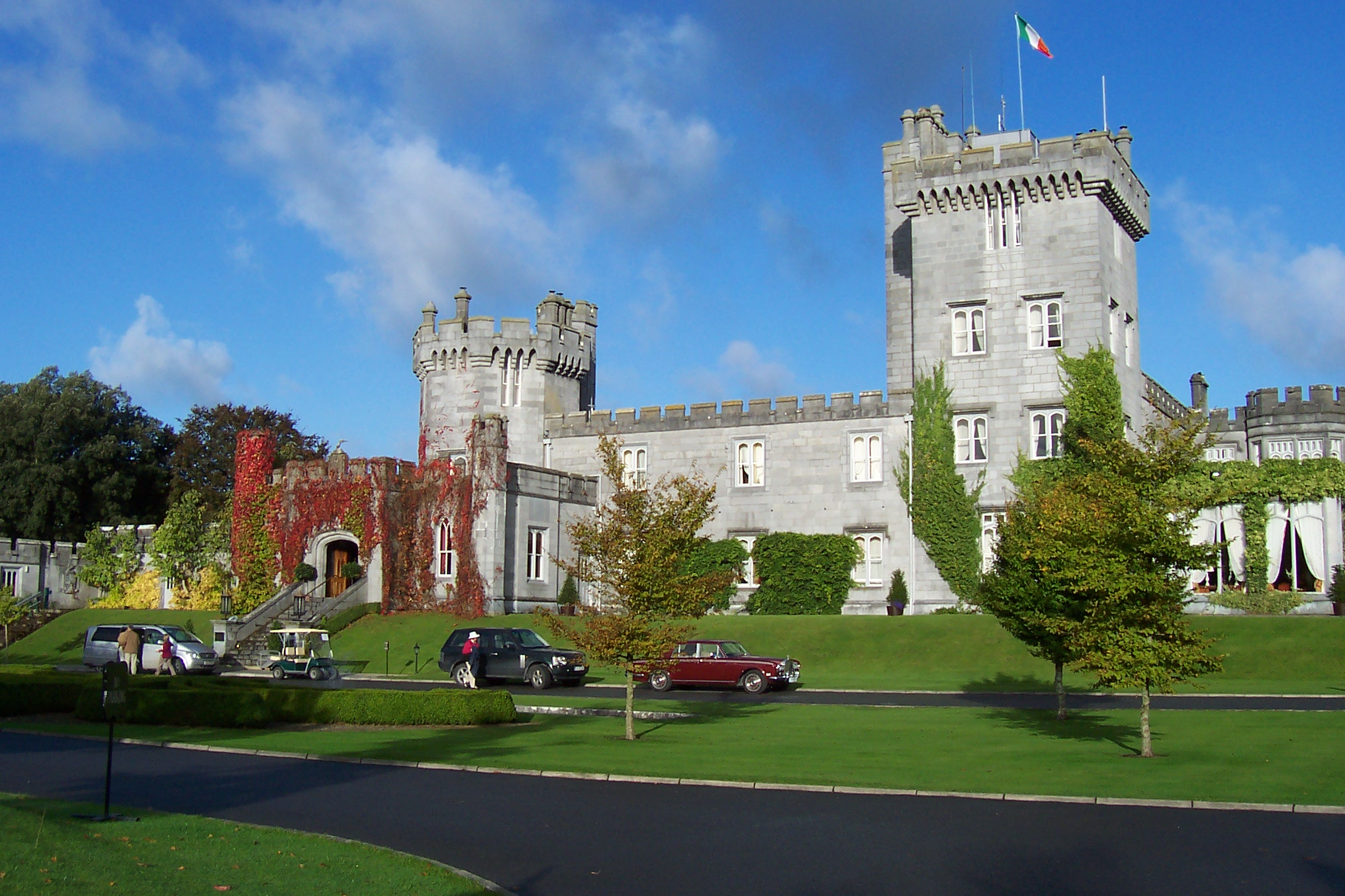
- Entrance to Dromoland Castle

General information
- Status: Luxury hotel
- Type: castle
- Architectural style: Gothic Revival
- Location: County Clare, Ireland
- Estimated completion: 15th/16th century (original); 1835 (current structure)

Design and construction
- Architects: James and George Richard Pain (current structure)

Earl of Thomond, Dromoland Castle
- Interactive map of Earl of Thomond, Dromoland Castle

Restaurant information
- Head chef: Jean Baptiste Molinari
- Rating: Michelin Guide (1995)
- Location: Newmarket-on-Fergus, Ireland

Dromoland Castle (Irish: Drom Ólainn) is a castle, located near Newmarket-on-Fergus in County Clare, Ireland. It is operated as a five-star luxury hotel with a golf course, with its restaurant, the "Earl of Thomond", being awarded a Michelin star in 1995, under head chef Jean Baptiste Molinari.

== Castle History ==
Dromoland Castle was the ancestral home of the O'Briens, Barons of Inchiquin, who are one of the few native Gaelic families of royal blood, and direct descendants of Brian Boroimhe (Boru), High King of Ireland in the eleventh century. For reasons of health and financial concerns, in the early 1960s Donough O'Brien (of the O'Brien dynasty), the sixteenth Baron of Inchiquin, decided to sell Dromoland castle, along with a parcel of 400 acres of land plus shooting and fishing rights to an American businessman, Bernard McDonough. McDonough, who was from West Virginia, had grandparents who had lived not far from Newmarket-on-Fergus, the village closest to the estate. After purchasing the estate in 1962, McDonough converted the castle into a luxury hotel in 1963.

Dromoland Castle Hotel is a member of Historic Hotels Worldwide.

== Famous guests ==
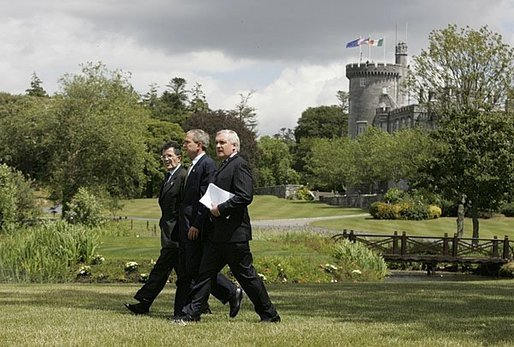
George W. Bush, Bertie Ahern, and Romano Prodi at their joint press conference at the Castle in 2004.

United States President George W. Bush spent the night of Friday, 26 June 2004, at Dromoland Castle to attend the EU-US Summit held at the facility. President Bush was guarded by approximately 7,000 police, military and private security forces during his 16-hour visit.

Over the years, notable people who have stayed at Dromoland Castle include John Lennon and George Harrison, Muhammad Ali, Bono, John Travolta, Juan Carlos I of Spain, Johnny Cash, and Nelson Mandela.
