= Francis Burton =

Francis Burton may refer to:

- Francis Burton (1696–1744), member of parliament for Coleraine, and for Clare
- Francis Burton (died 1832) (c. 1744–1832), MP and Justice of Chester
- Francis Burton, 2nd Baron Conyngham (c. 1725–1787), Irish peer and politician
- Francis Burton (Ennis MP) (died 1714), Irish politician
- Francis G. Burton (1840–1915), British engineer and accountant
- Francis H. Burton (1817–1872), Ontario businessman and political figure
- Sir Francis Nathaniel Burton (1766–1832), Canadian politician
  - Sir Francis N. Burton (ship)
- Francis Robert Burton (1840–1915), public servant in South Australia

== See also ==
- Frank Burton (disambiguation)
- Richard Francis Burton (1821–1890), British explorer
