= Hugh Massy =

Hugh Massy may refer to:

- Hugh Massy (British Army officer) (1884–1965)
- Hugh Massy, 1st Baron Massy (1700–1788), Anglo-Irish peer and politician
- Hugh Massy, 2nd Baron Massy (1733–1790), Anglo-Irish politician and peer
- Sir Hugh Massy, 1st Baronet (died 1807), Anglo-Irish politician and baronet
- Sir Hugh Massy, 2nd Baronet (1767–1842), Anglo-Irish politician and baronet
