= Sir Francis N. Burton (ship) =

In 1825, three vessels were launched at Quebec and named Sir Francis N. Burton or Sir Francis Burton for Lieutenant-Governor Francis Nathaniel Burton. The launching of three vessels of the same name in Quebec in the same year has led to some confusion in subsequent reports.

- Sir Francis N. Burton (1825 ship (1)) was launched in 1825 in Quebec. She assumed British registry on 6 January 1826. Pirates plundered her in 1828. She was wrecked on 7 November 1829.
- Sir Francis N. Burton (1825 ship (2)) was launched in 1825 at Quebec. She was wrecked on 5 December 1826 on a voyage for the British East India Company (EIC).
- Sir Francis Burton (1825 ship (3)) was launched at Quebec. She assumed British registry on 5 October 1827. She made several voyages to India under a license from the EIC. She was wrecked on 16 February 1838.
