= Vandeleur =

Van de Leur or Vandeleur is a surname. Notable people with the surname include:

- Crofton Vandeleur (1735–1794), Irish politician
- Crofton Moore Vandeleur (1809–1881), Irish politician
- Edward D. Vandeleur (1886–1943), American labor leader
- Giles Vandeleur (1911–1978), British army officer
- Iris Vandeleur (1884–1969), British actress
- Joe Vandeleur (1903–1988), British army officer
- John Ormsby Vandeleur (Ennis MP) (1765–1828), Irish politician
- John Ormsby Vandeleur (MP for Granard) (1767–1822), Irish politician
- Ormsby Vandeleur (1763–1849), British Army officer
- Thomas Burton Vandeleur (c.1767–1835), Irish barrister and judge
- Verona van de Leur (born 1985), Dutch gymnast and adult movie performer

== See also ==
- Vandeleur, Ontario
