= Thomas Keightley (disambiguation) =

Thomas Keightley (1789–1872) was a writer known for his works on mythology and folklore.

Thomas Keightley may also refer to:

- Thomas Keightley (MP) (1580–1663), British Member of Parliament for Bere Alston
- Thomas Keightley (official) (1650?–1719), English courtier and official in Ireland
