= Frank Burton =

Frank Burton may refer to:

- Frank Burton (footballer, born 1865) (1865–1948), Notts County, Nottingham Forest and England footballer
- Frank Burton (footballer, born 1890) (1890–1967), West Ham United and Charlton Athletic footballer
- Frank Burton (Sheriff of Nottinghamshire), High Sheriff of Nottinghamshire in 1938
- Frank P. Burton (1888–1956), American politician from Virginia
- Frank W. Burton (1857–1934), American politician and judge
- Frank Burton, character in Abduction (2011 film)

== See also ==
- Francis Burton (disambiguation)
