= Samuel Bindon =

Samuel Bindon may refer to:

- Samuel Bindon (Australian politician) (1812–1879)
- Samuel Bindon (Irish politician) (fl. 1715–1760)
