= Sir Lucius O'Brien, 3rd Baronet =

Irish baronet and politician (1731-1795)

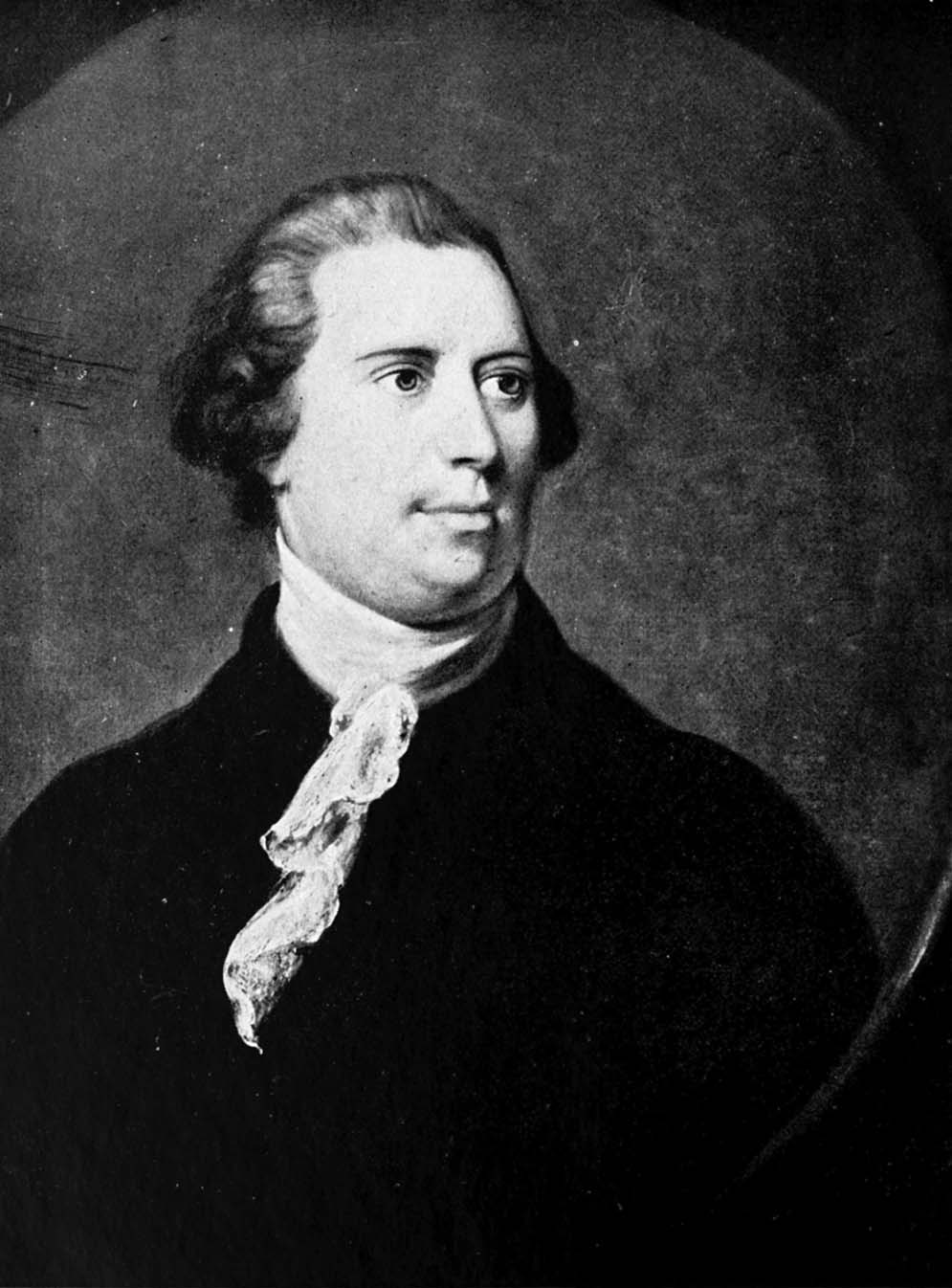
Sir Lucius O'Brien, 3rd Baronet

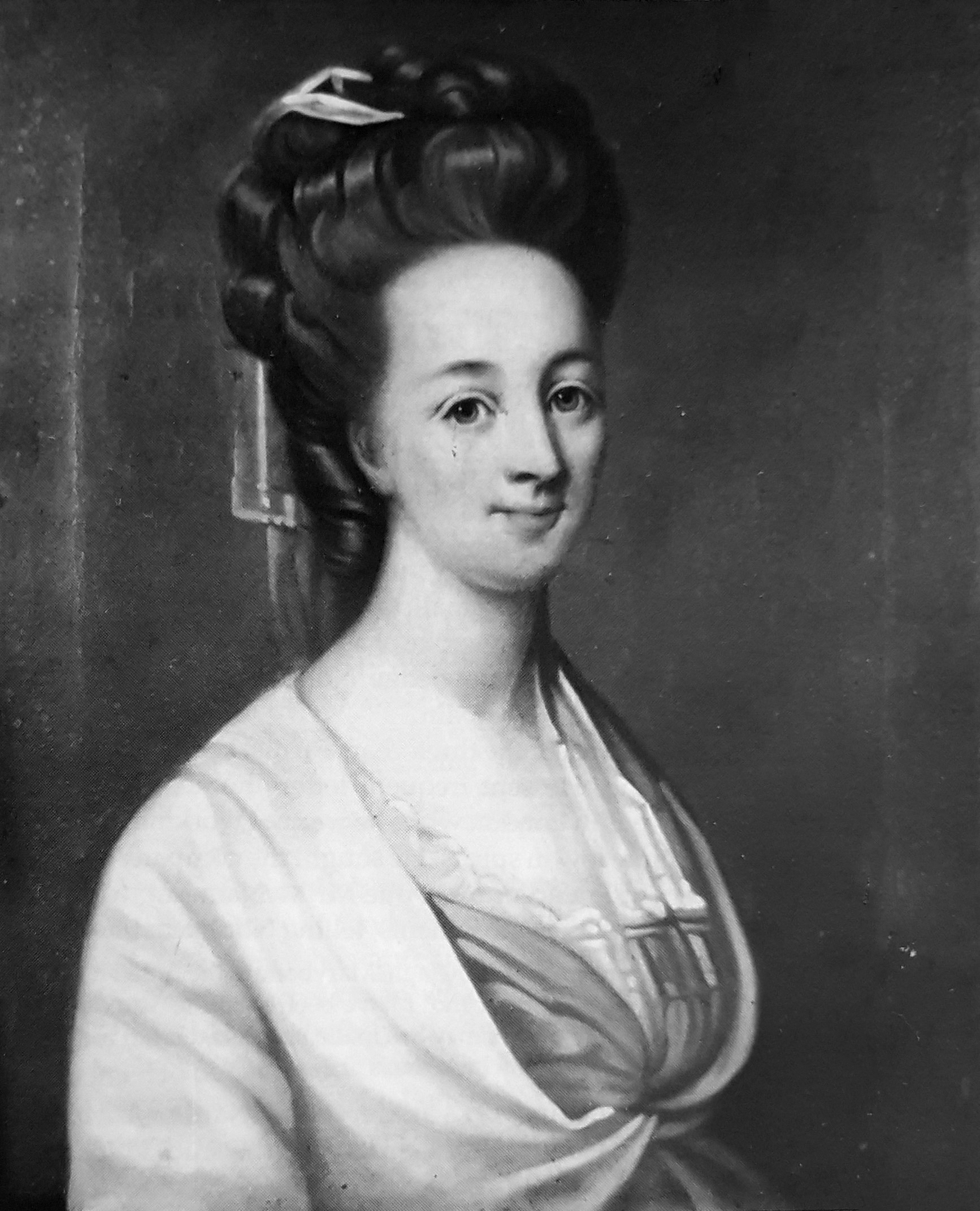
Ann French, wife of Sir Lucius O'Brien, 3rd Baronet.

Sir Lucius Henry O'Brien, 3rd Baronet PC (Ire) (2 September 1731 – 15 January 1795) was an Irish baronet and politician for 34 years.

He was a man of quite different parts to his father, an intellectual, a Greek and Latin scholar and a brilliant politician. He entered S.C. at Trinity College Dublin, on 9 July 1748, at the age of sixteen. He became a B.A. Vernon in 1752. Joined the Irish bar in 1758, and succeeded his father, as 3rd Baronet of Dromoland, becoming a Privy councillor and M.P.

== Background ==
O'Brien was the son of Sir Edward O'Brien, 2nd Baronet and his wife Mary Hickman, inheriting the baronetcy on the death of his father in 1765. He was educated at Trinity College Dublin and entered the Middle Temple in 1753, later becoming a barrister.

== Career ==
In 1761, he entered the Irish House of Commons as the member for Ennis, sitting until 1768. Subsequently, O'Brien successfully ran for County Clare, a seat previously held by his father, holding it until 1776. He was then again elected for Ennis, but following the unseating of Hugh Dillon Massy as Member of Parliament for Clare, O'Brien returned to represent that constituency in 1778. In the election of 1783, he became the representative for Tuam. O'Brien was sworn of the Privy Council of Ireland in 1786. He served for the latter constituency until 1790, when he was re-elected for Ennis. He held this seat finally until his death in 1795.

He was elected a Fellow of the Royal Society in 1773.

In 1787 he was appointed a Privy Counsellor and from 1788 to 1795 was Clerk of the Crown and Hanaper in the Irish Chancery.

== Family ==
O'Brien married Anne French, the daughter of Robert French, in 1768 and had by her seven children, three sons and four daughters. He was succeeded in the baronetcy as well as in the constituency of Ennis by his oldest son Edward.

His grandson James FitzGerald (1818–1896) was a prominent politician in New Zealand.

Parliament of Ireland
Preceded by David Bindon; Samuel Bindon	Member of Parliament for Ennis; 1761–1768; With: Thomas Burton	Succeeded by Charles McDonnell; Crofton Vandeleur
Preceded by Francis Pierpoint Burton; Charles MacDonnell	Member of Parliament for County Clare; 1768–1776; With: Francis Pierpoint Burton	Succeeded by Edward FitzGerald; Hugh Dillon Massy
Preceded by Charles McDonnell; Crofton Vandeleur	Member of Parliament for Ennis; 1776–1778; With: William Burton	Succeeded by William Burton; Francis Bernard
Preceded by Edward FitzGerald; Hugh Dillon Massy	Member of Parliament for County Clare; 1778–1783; With: Edward FitzGerald	Succeeded by Edward FitzGerald; Sir Hugh Massy, 1st Bt
Preceded by James Cuffe; David La Touche	Member of Parliament for Tuam; 1783–1790; With: Robert Day	Succeeded by Thomas Lighton; Jonah Barrington
Preceded by Stewart Weldon; John Thomas Foster	Member of Parliament for Ennis; 1790–1795; With: William Burton Conyngham	Succeeded by Sir Edward O'Brien, 4th Bt; William Burton Conyngham
Baronetage of Ireland
Preceded by Edward O'Brien	Baronet (of Leaghmenagh); 1765–1795	Succeeded by Edward O'Brien
