= List of shipwrecks in February 1838 =

The list of shipwrecks in February 1838 includes ships sunk, foundered, wrecked, grounded, or otherwise lost during February 1838.

== 1 February ==
List of shipwrecks: 1 February 1838
Ship	State	Description
Courier de Laguayra	France	The ship was wrecked at Veracruz, Mexico. She was on a voyage from Bordeaux, Gironde to Veracruz.
Lancet or Laurel	United States	The ship was lost off Veracruz with the loss of two of her crew. She was on a voyage from Bordeaux, Gironde, France to New York.
Margaret	United Kingdom	The schooner sank at Seaham, County Durham. Her crew were rescued.
Susan	United Kingdom	The ship was abandoned in the Atlantic Ocean. Her crew were rescued by John Lawson(United Kingdom). Susan was on a voyage from New Brunswick, British North America to Falmouth, Cornwall.

== 2 February ==
List of shipwrecks: 2 February 1838
Ship	State	Description
Aunt	United Kingdom	The ship was run down and sunk in the Irish Sea off Great Orme Head, Caernarfonshire by HMS Lucifer (Royal Navy). Her crew were rescued. Aunt was on a voyage from Liverpool, Lancashire to Watchet, Somerset.
Bazaliel	United Kingdom	The ship ran aground, capsized and was wrecked near Venice, Kingdom of Lombardy–Venetia. Her crew were rescued. She was on a voyage from St. Ives, Cornwall to Venice.
Eclipse	United Kingdom	The ship was driven ashore at the Back of the Wight, Isle of Wight. She was on a voyage from Messina, Sicily to Hamburg. Eclipse was refloated and taken into Weymouth, Dorset.
Enterprise	United Kingdom	The ship capsized and sank at Newport, Monmouthshire.

== 3 February ==
List of shipwrecks: 3 February 1838
Ship	State	Description
Brutus	United Kingdom	The ship was driven ashore at Jersey, Channel Islands. She was on a voyage from Jersey to Cádiz, Spain. Brutus was refloated the next day and taken into Jersey.
Hope	United Kingdom	The ship was driven ashore at Groomsport, County Antrim. She was on a voyage from Chepstow, Monmouthshire to Greenock, Renfrewshire. Hope was wrecked in a gale on 8 February.
Jupiter	United Kingdom	The ship foundered in the North Sea off the coast of Forfarshire.
William and Thomas	United Kingdom	The ship was driven ashore at Hayle, Cornwall.
Wolf	United Kingdom	The sloop foundered whilst on a voyage from Glasgow, Renfrewshire to Londonderry. Her crew were rescued by Mary (United Kingdom).

== 4 February ==
List of shipwrecks: 4 February 1838
Ship	State	Description
Cherub	United Kingdom	The ship was sighted off Dartmouth, Devon whilst on a voyage from South Shields, County Durham to Gibraltar. No further trace, presumed foundered with the loss of all hands.
Majestic	(United Kingdom of Great Britain and Ireland) British North America	The ship was abandoned in the Atlantic Ocean. Her crew were rescued by Ripley (United Kingdom). Majestic was on a voyage from Saint John, New Brunswick to Liverpool, Lancashire. She was discovered off the Berlengas, Portugal by HMS Trinculo (Royal Navy) and towed into Lisbon, Portugal, where she arrived on 25 May.
Rose	United Kingdom	The ship was driven ashore at Dundalk, County Louth. She was on a voyage from Neath, Glamorgan to Dundalk.

== 5 February ==
List of shipwrecks: 5 February 1838
Ship	State	Description
Bramley	United Kingdom	The ship was sighted off Cape de Gatt, Spain whilst ofn a voyage from Messina, Sicily to London. No further trace, presumed foundered with the loss of all hands.
Industria	Portugal	The brig was driven ashore and wrecked on the coast of Ceará, Brazil.
Maria José	Portugal	The brig was driven ashore on the coast of Ceará.
Martin Addison	United Kingdom	The brig ran aground and sank on the Goodwin Sands, Kent with the loss of three of her ten crew. She was on a voyage from South Shields, County Durham to Liverpool, Lancashire.
Ranger	United Kingdom	The ship was driven ashore at Falmouth.

== 6 February ==
List of shipwrecks: 6 February 1838
Ship	State	Description
Adelaide	United Kingdom	The ship struck a rock off Cap La Hougue, Seine-Inférieure, France and sank. Her crew were rescued. She was on a voyage from Newcastle upon Tyne, Northumberland to Tenerife, Canary Islands.
Exchange	United Kingdom	The ship was wrecked near Saint-Vaast-la-Hougue, Manche, France. Her crew were rescued. She was on a voyage from Newcastle upon Tyne to Jersey, Channel Islands.

== 7 February ==
List of shipwrecks: 7 February 1838
Ship	State	Description
Dundonald	United Kingdom	The ship was driven ashore at Waterford. She was later refloated.
Elizabeth	United Kingdom	The ship departed from Newry, County Antrim for London. No further trace, presumed foundered with the loss of all hands.
Jane	United Kingdom	The ship was driven ashore west of Calais, France. She was on a voyage from Newcastle upon Tyne, Northumberland to Calais. She was later refloated and taken into Calais.
Sceptre	United Kingdom	The ship was driven ashore west of Calais. She was on a voyage from Newcastle upon Tyne to Calais. Sceptre was later refloated and taken into Calais.
Traveller	United Kingdom	The ship was driven ashore at Duncannon Fort, County Wexford. She was on a voyage from Montevideo, Uruguay to Liverpool, Lancashire. Traveller was refloated on 10 February and taken into Waterford.

== 8 February ==
List of shipwrecks: 8 February 1838
Ship	State	Description
Active	United Kingdom	The ship was driven ashore at Plymouth, Devon. Shewa on a voyage from Neath, Glamorgan to London.
Sarah	United Kingdom	The ship was driven ashore and severely damaged near Ilfracombe, Devon. She was on a voyage from Glasgow, Renfrewshire to Bristol, Gloucestershire. Sarah was taken into Ilfracombe on 14 February.
Terpsichore	French Navy	The frigate was driven ashore at Cork. She was on a voyage from Martinique to Brest, Finistère. Terpsichore was later refloated and towed into Cork, where she arrived on 10 February.
Wansbeck	United Kingdom	The snow was lost off Barnstaple, Devon with the loss of all on board. She was on a voyage from Cork to Swansea, Glamorgan. She came ashore at Bideford, Devon on 9 February in a capsized condition.

== 9 February ==
List of shipwrecks: 9 February 1838
Ship	State	Description
Douglas	United Kingdom	The ship was driven ashore in the River Shannon. She was on a voyage from Limerick to London.
Holland	United Kingdom	The brig was driven ashore and wrecked at Seaham, County Durham.
Regard	United Kingdom	The ship departed from Limerick for London. No further trace, presumed foundered with the loss of all hands.
Speculator	United Kingdom	The smack foundered in the North Sea off Cromer, Norfolk. Her crew were rescued by Captain Brown (United Kingdom). Speculator was on a voyage from Ipswich, Suffolk to Newcastle upon Tyne, Northumberland.

== 10 February ==
List of shipwrecks: 10 February 1838
Ship	State	Description
Breisis	United Kingdom	The ship was driven ashore by ice in the Nieuw Diep.
Eagle	United Kingdom	The ship was wrecked off Ballywalter, County Down. Her crew were rescued. She was on a voyage from Dublin to Fort William, Inverness-shire.
Fourmi	France	The ship was wrecked at Senegal.
Mary	United Kingdom	The barque foundered in the Atlantic Ocean between the Outer Hebrides and Cape Clear Island, County Cork with the loss of fourteen of her nineteen crew. Survivors were rescued by John (United Kingdom). Mary was on a voyage from Demerara to London.
Pendennis	United Kingdom	The ship was driven ashore and damaged near Dartmouth Castle, Devon. She was later refloated.
Vestal	United Kingdom	The sloop sprang a leak and foundered in the Bristol Channel off Baggy Point, Devon. Her crew were rescued. She was on a voyage from Portmadoc, Caernarfonshire to Gloucester.

== 11 February ==
List of shipwrecks: 11 February 1838
Ship	State	Description
Kitty	United Kingdom	The ship capsized in the North Sea off the coast of Norfolk. She was on a voyage from King's Lynn, Norfolk to London. Kitty was beached at Great Yarmouth, Norfolk in a capsized condition.

== 12 February ==
List of shipwrecks: 12 February 1838
Ship	State	Description
Ellen Brooks	United States	The ship ran aground on Taylor's Bank, in Liverpool Bay. She was on a voyage from New Orleans, Louisiana to Liverpool, Lancashire, United Kingdom. She was later refloated and taken into Liverpool.
Martin	United Kingdom	The brig was wrecked on the Goodwin Sands, Kent with the loss of three of her crew. Survivors were rescued by Sparrow (United Kingdom). Martin was on a voyage from South Shields, County Durham to Liverpool.

== 13 February ==
List of shipwrecks: 13 February 1838
Ship	State	Description
Concordia	United Kingdom	The ship was driven ashore and wrecked at Gibraltar.
Eliza and Susan	United Kingdom	The brig was driven ashore and wrecked at Gibraltar.
Elizabeth and Anne	United States	The brig was driven ashore and wrecked at Gibraltar.
Hecla	United Kingdom	The brig was driven ashore and wrecked at Gibraltar
Keola	United States	The brig was driven ashore and wrecked at Gibraltar.
Maria	United Kingdom	The ship was driven ashore and wrecked at Gibraltar.
Rhein	Prussia	The ship was driven ashore and wrecked in the River Tay.
Three Brothers	United Kingdom	The ship was driven ashore and wrecked at Gibraltar.

== 14 February ==
List of shipwrecks: 14 February 1838
Ship	State	Description
Alert	United Kingdom	The ship was beached at Cork.
Burgher	Netherlands	The ship was driven ashore and wrecked in the Isles of Scilly, United Kingdom of Great Britain and Ireland. She was on a voyage from Liverpool, Lancashire, United Kingdom to Rotterdam, South Holland.
Catherine O'Flanaghan	United Kingdom	The ship was driven ashore in the Isles of Scilly. Her crew were rescued.
Eintrachtigheden	Netherlands	The ship was holed by ice and sank at Hellevoetsluis, Zeeland.
Elizabeth and Catherine	United Kingdom	The ship was wrecked at Bideford, Devon with the loss of two lives. She was on a voyage from Barnstaple, Devon to a Welsh port.
Hopewell	United Kingdom	The collier was wrecked on the Horseshoe Sand. Her crew were rescued. Hopewell was refloated on 9 March and taken into Portsmouth.
Thetis	United Kingdom	The ship was driven ashore at Plymouth, Devon with the loss of a crew member. She was on a voyage from South Shields, County Durham to Swansea, Glamorgan.
Twee Broeders	Netherlands	The ship ran aground in the Isles of Scilly. Her crew were rescued. She was on a voyage from Surinam to Amsterdam, North Holland.
Victoria	United Kingdom	The ship was driven ashore in the Isles of Scilly. Her crew were rescued.
Wanderer	Bremen	The ship was driven ashore at Cap-Haïtien, Haiti. She was on a voyage from Bremen to Cap-Haïtien. Wanderer was later refloated and taken into port.
Zorgen Vlyt	Netherlands	The ship was driven ashore in the Isles of Scilly. Her crew were rescued. She was on a voyage from Liverpool to Rotterdam, South Holland.

== 15 February ==
List of shipwrecks: 15 February 1838
Ship	State	Description
Atlas	United Kingdom	The ship was driven ashore at Weymouth, Dorset. She was on a voyage from Dublin to London. Atlas was refloated on 20 February and taken into Weymouth.
Azia	Netherlands	The ship was driven ashore near Trefusis Point, Cornwall, United Kingdom. She was on a voyage from Batavia, Netherlands East Indies to Middelburg, Zeeland.
Brunswick	United Kingdom	The brig was wrecked on the Gunfleet Sand, in the North Sea off the coast of Essex. Her crew were rescued.
Catherine	United Kingdom	The ship was driven ashore near Milford Haven, Pembrokeshire. She was refloated on 22 February.
Cestus or Sisters	United Kingdom	The ship was wrecked on the Gunfleet Sand, in the North Sea off the coast of Essex. Her crew were rescued.
Cranant or Cranum	United Kingdom	The ship was wrecked at Plymouth, Devon. She was on a voyage from South Shields, County Durham to Dublin.
De Hoop	Netherlands	The ship was capsized and sank at Little Falmouth, Cornwall, United Kingdom. Her crew were rescued. She was on a voyage from Amsterdam, North Holland to Trieste.
Dewdrop	United Kingdom	The ship was driven ashore at Falmouth, Cornwall. She was on a voyage from Amsterdam, North Holland, Netherlands to Trieste.
Dumbarton Castle	United Kingdom	The ship was abandoned in the Atlantic Ocean. She was on a voyage from Trinidad to London.
Eliza	United Kingdom	The ship was driven ashore near Milford Haven. Her crew were rescued.
Eliza	United Kingdom	The schooner was driven ashore at White Point, County Cork. Her crew were rescued. She was on a voyage from Cork to Bristol. Eliza was refloated on 17 February.
Emma	United Kingdom	The schooner was driven ashore and wrecked at Cobh, County Cork.
Euterpe	United Kingdom	The ship was driven ashore at Cork. She was on a voyage from Demerara to the Clyde. Euterpe was refloated on 17 February.
Fanny	United Kingdom	The schooner foundered off Poor Head, County Cork.
Frances	United Kingdom	The ship was driven ashore near Waterford.
Friendship	United Kingdom	The ship was driven ashore near Milford Haven.
George IV	United Kingdom	The ship was driven ashore and wrecked near Tenby, Pembrokeshire. Her crew were rescued. She was on a voyage from Falmouth, Cornwall to Llanelly, Glamorgan.
Henry	United Kingdom	The brig was driven ashore and sank at Cork. Her captain, the only person on board, survived.
Joseph	United Kingdom	The ship was driven ashore at Monkstown, County Cork. She was on a voyage from Cork to Bristol, Gloucestershire.
Joven Matilda	Portugal	The brig was driven ashore at Lisbon. She was later refloated.
Julia	United Kingdom	The schooner was driven ashore at Cobh.
Leger	(United Kingdom of Great Britain and Ireland) British North America	The ship was driven ashore at Cobh. She was on a voyage from Southampton, Hampshire to Swansea, Glamorgan.
Liverpool	United Kingdom	The ship sank in Beaumaris Bay. Her crew were rescued. She was on a voyage from Waterford to Liverpool, Lancashire. She was refloated on 26 February and found to be severely damaged.
Lisette Caroline	France	The ship was driven ashore at Petten, North Holland, Netherlands. She was on a voyage from Bordeaux, Gironde to Amsterdam, North Holland. Lisette Caroline was refloated on 20 February.
Mary	United Kingdom	The ship was driven ashore at Labasheeda, County Clare.
Nailer	United Kingdom	The barque was driven ashore at White Point, Cork. She was on a voyage from Africa to Liverpool. Nailer had been refloated by 26 February.
Nelcus	United Kingdom	The ship was driven ashore and damaged at Milford Haven.
Nottingham	United Kingdom	The ship was driven ashore at Weymouth. She was on a voyage from Portland, Dorset to London. Nottingham was refloated on 22 February and taken into Weymouth.
HMS Ranger	Royal Navy	The brig was driven ashore at Trefusis Point with the loss of a crew member.
Rose	United Kingdom	The ship was destroyed by fire at Tralee, County Cork. Her crew survived.
Tagus	United Kingdom	The ship struck rocks off St. Ives, Cornwall and was abandoned by her crew. She was on a voyage from Newport, Monmouthshire to London.
Temperance	United Kingdom	The brig was driven ashore and scuttled at Cork.
Terpsichore	French Navy	The frigate was driven ashore at Cork. She was refloated on 18 February.
Traitor	United Kingdom	The ship was driven ashore at Cobh.

== 16 February ==
List of shipwrecks: 16 February 1838
Ship	State	Description
Active	United Kingdom	The ship was abandoned in the English Channel off The Lizard, Cornwall. Her crew were rescued by Charlotte (United Kingdom) Active was on a voyage from Newcastle upon Tyne, Northumberland to Corsica, France.
Antrim	United Kingdom	The ship was beached in Cloughy Bay, where she was wrecked with the loss of her captain. She was on a voyage from Belfast, County Antrim to Liverpool, Lancashire.
Arran	United Kingdom	The ship was wrecked near the Hook Lighthouse, County Wexford. Her crew were rescued. She was on a voyage from Wexford to Gloucester.
Betsey	United Kingdom	The ship foundered off Howth, County Dublin with the loss of all hands. She was on a voyage from Liverpool to Carmarthen.
Earl of Selkirk	United Kingdom	The ship was lost on the Kish Bank, in the Irish Sea with the loss of all hands. She was on a voyage from Whitehaven, Cumberland to Dublin.
Edmund	United Kingdom	The schooner foundered 50 nautical miles (93 km) south east of Cobh, County Cork. Her crew were rescued by Victoria (United Kingdom). Edmund was on a voyage from Neath, Glamorgan to Mount's Bay.
Elizabeth	United Kingdom	The ship ran aground on the Thurslet Spit, in the River Thames at Purfleet, Essex and sank. She was refloated in mid-May.
Emanuel	United Kingdom	The ship foundered whilst on a voyage from Neath, Glamorgan to Mount's Bay. Her crew were rescued.
Friends	United Kingdom	The ship was driven ashore at Milford Haven, Pembrokeshire. Her crew were rescued. She was on a voyage from Gloucester to Dublin.
Glengarry	United Kingdom	The sloop was wrecked near Dungarvan, County Waterford. Her crew were rescued. She was on a voyage from Dublin to Cork.
Hyperion	United States	The ship was wrecked on Anegada, Virgin Islands. She was on a voyage from Amsterdam, North Holland, Netherlands to Baltimore, Maryland.
Jubilee	United States	The full-rigged ship was wrecked near Dungarvan. Her crew were rescued. She was on a voyage from Liverpool to Mobile, Alabama, United States.
Mary Ann	United Kingdom	The ship was wrecked at Dublin with the loss of all hands.
Moscow	United Kingdom	The ship was driven ashore at Slaughterhouse Point, New Orleans, Louisiana, United States. She was on a voyage from New Orleans to Liverpool.
New Expedition	United Kingdom	The ship was driven ashore and wrecked at Rathmullen, County Donegal. She was on a voyage from Ballina, County Mayo to Gloucester.
Nymph	United Kingdom	The schooner capsized and sank 1 nautical mile (1.9 km) off Whitehaven, Cumberland with the loss of all hands. She was on a voyage from Wicklow to Lancaster, Lancashire.
Sedulous	United Kingdom	The ship was driven ashore and wrecked at Hacken Point. She was on a voyage from Swansea, Glamorgan to Cardigan.
Severn	United Kingdom	The schooner was driven ashore at Rathmullen. She was on a voyage from Letterkenny, County Donegal to Liverpool.
Sir Francis Burton	United Kingdom	The ship foundered in Ardmore Bay with the loss of all hands. She was on a voyage from Liverpool to Demerara, British Guiana.
Tyger	(United Kingdom of Great Britain and Ireland) British North America	The schooner was driven ashore in Kelly's Cove, County Cork. Her crew were rescued. She was on a voyage from Southampton, Hampshire to Swansea.

== 17 February ==
List of shipwrecks: 17 February 1838
Ship	State	Description
Catherine	United Kingdom	The ship was abandoned off Youghal, County Cork and foundered. Her crew were rescued by Ripley (United Kingdom). Catherine was on a voyage from Swansea, Glamorgan to Plymouth, Devon.
Groot Lankum	Netherlands	The ship was abandoned in the Irish Channel. Her crew were rescued by the steamship Gipsy (United Kingdom). She was on a voyage from Liverpool to Amsterdam, North Holland.
John Stamp	United Kingdom	The East Indiaman, a full-rigged ship, was driven ashore and wrecked at Leestone Point, near Kilkeel, County Down with the loss of seven of her nineteen crew. She was on a voyage from Bombay, India to Liverpool, Lancashire.
Kennedy	United Kingdom	The schooner was wrecked near Ardglass, County Down.
Paragon	United Kingdom	The ship was driven ashore and wrecked at "Ballynecker", County Wexford. She was on a voyage from Liverpool, Lancashire to Pernambuco, Brazil.
№ 6	United Kingdom	The pilot boat, a smack was driven ashore at Dale, Pembrokeshire in a capsized condition.

== 18 February ==
List of shipwrecks: 18 February 1838
Ship	State	Description
Douglas	United Kingdom	The schooner ran aground in Blacksod Bay. Her eleven crew were rescued. She was on a voyage from Limerick to London. She was a wreck by mid-March.
John and Eliza	United Kingdom	The schooner was wrecked on a rock off "Cable Island" with the loss of a crew member. She was on a voyage from Caernarfon to London.

== 19 February ==
List of shipwrecks: 19 February 1838
Ship	State	Description
Cordelia	United Kingdom	The ship was abandoned in the Atlantic Ocean off the Isles of Scilly. Her crew were rescued by Palmyra(United Kingdom). She was on a voyage from Newcastle upon Tyne, Northumberland to Cádiz, Spain.
Friends	United Kingdom	The ship was driven ashore at Bideford, Devon, where she was subsequently wrecked. She was on a voyage from Gloucester to Dublin.

== 20 February ==
List of shipwrecks: 20 February 1838
Ship	State	Description
Calpé	France	The ship was driven ashore near Dénia, Spain. She was on a voyage from Marseille, Bouches-du-Rhône to Rouen, Seine-Inférieure.
Cleveland	United Kingdom	The brig departed from Stockton-on-Tees, County Durham. No further trace, presumed foundered with the loss of all hands.
Ellen and Mary	United Kingdom	The ship was driven ashore at "Mastick".
Rouennais	France	The ship struck a sunken wreck in the English Channel and sprang a leak. She put into Cowes, Isle of Wight for repairs.

== 21 February ==
List of shipwrecks: 21 February 1838
Ship	State	Description
Kingston	United Kingdom	The ship was driven ashore and wrecked at Carnsore Point, County Wexford. She was on a voyage from Teignmouth, Devon to Glasgow, Renfrewshire.
Thetis	United Kingdom	The brig was wrecked at Plymouth, Devon with the loss of one of her six. Survivors were rescued by the Harbour Master's boat Tavy (United Kingdom). Thetis was on a voyage from Newcastle upon Tyne, Northumberland to Dublin.
Thomas Armstrong	United Kingdom	The ship was wrecked 4 nautical miles (7.4 km) east of Terceira Island, Azores. All on board were rescued. She was on a voyage from Liverpool, Lancashire to Newfoundland, British North America.

== 22 February ==
List of shipwrecks: 22 February 1838
Ship	State	Description
Aurora	United Kingdom	The ship was driven ashore at Dungeness, Kent. She was on a voyage from London to Newfoundland, British North America. She was refloated the next day and taken into Dover, Kent.
Dorothy	United Kingdom	The ship ran aground on the North Gaze, in the North Sea. She was later refloated and taken into the River Tees.
Mariote	France	The ship was wrecked at Île d'Aix, Charente-Maritime. Her crew were rescued.
Nautilus	United Kingdom	The ship struck the Polder Sand, in the North Sea and was abandoned by her crew. She was on a voyage from Ipswich, Suffolk to Liverpool, Lancashire. Nautilus was subsequently discovered by Adeona and taken into Dover, Kent.
Secret	United Kingdom	The ship departed from London for São Miguel Island, Azores. No further trace, presumed foundered with the loss of all hands.

== 23 February ==
List of shipwrecks: 23 February 1838
Ship	State	Description
Ant	United Kingdom	The ship was wrecked on the Haisborough Sands, in the North Sea off the coast of Norfolk. Her crew were rescued by Nimrod (United Kingdom). Ant was on a voyage from Gibraltar to Newcastle upon Tyne, Northumberland.
Constitution	United Kingdom	The ship was wrecked in Dundrum Bay. Her crew were rescued. She was on a voyage from Liverpool, Lancashire to Charleston, South Carolina, United States.
Dundalk	United Kingdom	The ship was driven ashore and wrecked at Balbriggan, County Dublin. Her crew were rescued. She was on a voyage from Liverpool to Dundalk, County Louth. She was refloated on 4 April and taken into Drogheda, County Louth.
Mary Ann	United Kingdom	The packet boat was driven ashore at Peterhead, Aberdeenshire. Her crew were rescued by rocket apparatus. She was on a voyage from Peterhead to Lerwick, Shetland Islands. Mary Ann had become a wreck by 26 February.

== 24 February ==
List of shipwrecks: 24 February 1838
Ship	State	Description
Ann	United Kingdom	The ship was wrecked in Berwick Bay with the loss of all hands.
Barjona	United Kingdom	The ship was wrecked at Ferry-Port on Craig, Fife. All on board were rescued.
Barbara	United Kingdom	The brig was driven ashore north of Sunderland, County Durham.
Benwell	United Kingdom	The brig struck the Sheringham Shoal, in the North Sea off the coast of Norfolk and sank. Her crew were rescued. She was on a voyage from Newcastle upon Tyne, Northumberland to London.
Blossom	United Kingdom	The ship was driven ashore near Blyth, Northumberland. She was refloated about a month later and taken into Blyth.
Brodene	Norway	The ship was dismasted whilst on a voyage from Bergen to St. Ubes, Portugal. She was abandoned on 28 February. Her crew were rescued by Maria (United Kingdom).
Bulwark	United Kingdom	The ship was driven ashore and wrecked at Whitehouse, County Antrim with the loss of a crew member.
Claudina	France	The ship was driven ashore and wrecked at Gibraltar.
Concezione	Kingdom of Sardinia	The ship was driven ashore at Gibraltar.
Constitution	United States	The ship was driven ashore and wrecked at Killough, County Down, United Kingdom. Her 24 crew were rescued. She was on a voyage from Liverpool, Lancashire, United Kingdom to Charleston, South Carolina.
Dispatch	United Kingdom	The sloop was driven ashore and wrecked at Dunbar, Lothian. Her crew were rescued.
Ellen	United Kingdom	The ship was driven ashore in the Castletown River. She was on a voyage from Preston, Lancashire to Wicklow.
Enterprise	United Kingdom	The ship ran aground on the Bacon Ledge, in the Isles of Scilly and was damaged. She was on a voyage from the Gambia to London.
Friends	United Kingdom	The brig was driven ashore and wrecked at Sea Palling, Norfolk. Her crew were rescued. She was on a voyage from Newcastle upon Tyne to London.
Gleaner	United Kingdom	The ship was driven ashore and wrecked near Fraserburgh, Aberdeenshire. She was on a voyage from Sunderland to Fraserburgh.
Guisione	Austrian Empire	The ship was driven ashore at Gibraltar.
Gustave	France	The ship was driven ashore and wrecked at Gibraltar.
Industry	France	The ship was driven ashore at Gibraltar.
James and Theresa	United Kingdom	The ship was driven ashore at Cresswell, Northumberland She was refloated on 16 March and taken into Blyth, Northumberland.
Lamilta or Umilta	Kingdom of the Two Sicilies	The ship was wrecked on a reef off Tresco, Isles of Scilly. She was on a voyage from Messina to Antwerp, Belgium.
Lapwing	United Kingdom	The ship was driven ashore at Craster, Northumberland, or Caister-on-Sea, Norfolk. Her crew were rescued.
Loyal	United Kingdom	The ship ran aground on the Herd Sand, in the North Sea off the coast of County Durham and was damaged. She was on a voyage from London to South Shields, County Durham. Loyal was refloated on 26 February and taken into South Shields.
Lyons	United Kingdom	The ship struck a rock at St. Mary's, Isles of Scilly and was damaged.
March	United Kingdom	The ship was driven ashore at Bayside, Gibraltar.
Mary Ann and Isabella	United Kingdom	The ship was driven ashore and wrecked at Redheugh, Northumberland with the loss of all hands.
Modeste	France	The ship was driven ashore and wrecked at Bône, Algeria. She was on a voyage from Batavia, Netherlands East Indies to Marseille, Bouches-du-Rhône.
Rival	United Kingdom	The schooner was driven ashore and wrecked on the Haughs of Benholm, Aberdeenshire Her crew survived. She was on a voyage from Newcastle upon Tyne to Aberdeen.
Robert	United Kingdom	The ship was wrecked at Hartlepool, County Durham. Her crew were rescued. She was on a voyage from Sunderland, County Durham to London.
Rosita	Spain	The ship was driven ashore at Gibraltar.
Rowena	United Kingdom	The ship ran aground and was wrecked off St. Patrick's Island, County Dublin. She was abandoned by her six crew, who were drowned when their boat capsized. Rowena was on a voyage from Chepstow, Monmouthshire to Belfast, County Antrim.
Swallow	United Kingdom	The ship was driven ashore in the Bay of Ardnahow. Her crew were rescued. She was on a voyage from Limerick to London.
Volusia	United Kingdom	The schooner was driven ashore and wrecked on St. Patrick's Island with the loss of all hands.
Voyager	United Kingdom	The ship was abandoned off Flamborough Head, Yorkshire. She was taken into Grimsby, Lincolnshire on 26 February.

== 25 February ==
List of shipwrecks: 25 February 1838
Ship	State	Description
Africaine	France	The ship was driven ashore at Gibraltar.
Anna	Grand Duchy of Tuscany	The ship was driven ashore at Gibraltar.
Anne	United Kingdom	The ship foundered in the North Sea off the coast of Northumberland with the loss of all hands.
Ariel	United Kingdom	The ship was wrecked on the Cross Sand, in the North Sea off the coast of Norfolk. Her crew were rescued. She subsequently came ashore at Covehithe, Suffolk.
Arno	United Kingdom	The ship was damaged at Plymouth, Devon. She was on a voyage from London to Cádiz, Spain.
Ceres	United Kingdom	The brig was wrecked on the Peffer Sands, near Berwick upon Tweed, Northumberland, with the loss of all hands. She was on a voyage from Aberdeen to London.
Chanticleer	United States	The ship was wrecked on the Orange Keys. Her crew were rescued. She was on a voyage from New York to Havana, Cuba.
Coronation	United Kingdom	The ship was damaged at Plymouth.
Daniel	United Kingdom	The ship was driven ashore and severely damaged at Plymouth.
Dart	United Kingdom	The ship was driven ashore and capsized at Gosport, Hampshire. She was on a voyage from Jersey, Channel Islands to Portsmouth, Hampshire.
Eliza	Kingdom of Sardinia	The ship was driven ashore at Gibraltar.
Elizabeth	United Kingdom	The Llanelly-registered ship was driven ashore at Plymouth.
Elizabeth	United Kingdom	The Milford Haven-registered ship was driven ashore at Plymouth.
Frances	United Kingdom	The schooner was driven ashore and wrecked near Whitburn, County Durham with the loss of three of her six crew. She was on a voyage from London to Newcastle upon Tyne, Northumberland.
Freccia	Kingdom of Sardinia	The ship was driven ashore at Gibraltar.
Friendship	United Kingdom	The ship was driven ashore and severely damaged at Plymouth. She was on a voyage from Portsmouth, Hampshire to Constantinople, Ottoman Empire.
Globe	United Kingdom	The ship was driven ashore in Cádiz Bay. She was on a voyage from Montevideo, Uruguay to Cádiz, Spain.
Harmony	United Kingdom	The ship was driven ashore at Gibraltar.
Harriett	United Kingdom	The ship was wrecked near Aveiro, Portugal. Her crew were rescued. She was on a voyage from Cardiff, glamorgan to Lisbon, Portugal.
Henry	United Kingdom	The ship was damaged at Plymouth. She was on a voyage from Swansea, Glamorgan to London.
Isabel	United Kingdom	The ship was driven ashore at Gibraltar.
Jenny	United Kingdom	The ship was driven ashore and wrecked at Newton-by-the-Sea, Northumberland with the loss of two of her crew. She was on a voyage from Newcastle upon Tyne to London.
John Carnell	United Kingdom	The ship capsized at Plymouth. She was righted on 26 February.
Lord Rolle	United Kingdom	The ship was driven ashore at Plymouth.
Magdalena della Grazie	Kingdom of Sardinia	The ship was driven ashore at Gibraltar.
Madalena de Monte Negro	Kingdom of Sardinia	The ship was driven ashore at Gibraltar.
Maria	United Kingdom	The ship was driven ashore at Plymouth.
Nelson	United Kingdom	The sloop foundered off the Longships Lighthouse. Her crew were rescued by the steamship Killarney (United Kingdom).
Petrel	United Kingdom	The ship was driven to sea and wrecked off Plymouth.
Sally	United Kingdom	The ship foundered in the North Sea off the coast of Northumberland.
San Christobal	United Kingdom	The ship was driven ashore at Gibraltar.
Sanpreviva	Kingdom of Sardinia	The ship was driven ashore at Gibraltar.
Sea Lark	United Kingdom	The ship was wrecked near Penzance, Cornwall.
Sedulous	United Kingdom	The ship was wrecked on the Sheringham Shoals, in the North Sea off the coast of Norfolk. Her crew were rescued by Coronation (United Kingdom).
Strabane	United Kingdom	The ship ran aground on the India Bank, in the Irish Sea off the coast of County Wicklow and was severely damaged with the loss of two of her crew. She was on a voyage from the Clyde to Bombay, India. Strabane was later towed into Kingstown, County Dublin by the steamship Star.
Thetis	United Kingdom	The ship was driven ashore and wrecked at Plymouth.
Unity	United Kingdom	The ship was scuttled at Looe, Cornwall.
Veloce	Kingdom of Sardinia	The ship was driven ashore at Gibraltar.
Yeoman's Glory	United Kingdom	The ship was damaged at Plymouth.

== 26 February ==
List of shipwrecks: 26 February 1838
Ship	State	Description
Abeona	(United Kingdom of Great Britain and Ireland) Jersey	The ship was driven ashore and wrecked at Portaferry, County Down. She was on a voyage from Jersey to Glasgow, Renfrewshire.
Augustine	United Kingdom	The ship was wrecked at Sainte-Marie, Île Bourbon.
Benjamin	United Kingdom	The ship was driven ashore at Blyth, Northumberland. She was on a voyage from King's Lynn, Norfolk to Blyth. Benjamin was refloated on 25 March and taken into Blyth for repairs.
Edgar	United Kingdom	The collier was wrecked on the Stoney Binks, in the North Sea off the coast of County Durham. Her crew were rescued. She was on a voyage from South Shields, County Durham to London.
Experiment	United Kingdom	The ship was driven ashore at Padstow, Cornwall. She was on a voyage from Cardiff, Glamorgan to Padstow.
Friends	United Kingdom	The ship was driven ashore and wrecked at Ilfracombe, Devon. She was on a voyage from Gloucester to Dublin.
Industry	United Kingdom	The ship was abandoned in the Atlantic Ocean. Her crew were rescued by Isabella (United Kingdom). Industry was on a voyage from Gloucester to Saint John, New Brunswick, British North America.
Josephine	France	The ship was wrecked at Mogadore, Morocco. Her crew were rescued.
Liberty	United Kingdom	The collier was wrecked on the Stoney Binks with the loss of either a crew member, or all hands. She was on a voyage from South Shields to London.
Orissa	United Kingdom	The ship was driven ashore at Ballymoney, County Antrim. She was on a voyage from Glasgow to Bristol, Gloucestershire.
Providence	United Kingdom	The collier was wrecked on the Stoney Binks with the loss of all hands. She was on a voyage from Blyth, Northumberland to London.
Rainbow	United Kingdom	The ship was wrecked south of Seaham, County Durham. Her crew were rescued, but her captain's wife died.
Urania	United Kingdom	The ship was driven ashore at Harwich, Essex. She was on a voyage from Stockton-on-Tees, County Durham to London. Urania was later refloated and taken into Harwich.
William	United Kingdom	The ship was wrecked on the Haisborough Sands, in the North Sea off the coast of Norfolk. The eight people on board took to the ship's boat, but were drowned when it capsized.

== 27 February ==
List of shipwrecks: 27 February 1838
Ship	State	Description
Bee's Wing	United Kingdom	The ship ran aground in the Douro River. She was on a voyage from Porto, Portugal to London. She was refloated on 18 March.
Charles and Henry	United Kingdom	The ship was driven ashore and damaged on Drake's Island, Devon. She was on a voyage from Llanelly, Glamorgan to London. Charles and Henry was refloated and taken into Plymouth, Devon.
Friendship	United Kingdom	The ship was driven ashore and wrecked at Sunderland, County Durham with the loss of a crew member.
Helen	United Kingdom	The ship was in collision with HMS Volcano (Royal Navy) and foundered in Mahomet's Bay. She was on a voyage from Catania, Sicily to Glasgow, Renfrewshire.
Honduras	United Kingdom	The ship was driven ashore in the Tamar River. She was on a voyage from Launceston, Van Diemen's Land to London. Honduras was later refloated and taken into Launceston for repairs.
Steforello	France	The ship was driven ashore and wrecked at Gibraltar.

== 28 February ==
List of shipwrecks: 28 February 1838
Ship	State	Description
Active	United Kingdom	The schooner was wrecked on a sandbank 2 nautical miles (3.7 km) south of Llanelly, Glamorgan. She was on a voyage from Truro, Cornwall to Aberavon, Glamorgan. A person assisting in the salvage of the vessel was drowned on 28 February.
Jane	United Kingdom	The ship was driven ashore at Walton-on-the-Naze, Essex. She was on a voyage from Great Yarmouth, Norfolk to London. Jane was refloated and taken into Harwich, Essex.
William and Catherine	United Kingdom	The ship was driven ashore near Portsmouth, Hampshire. She was on a voyage from Newcastle upon Tyne, Northumberland to Portsmouth.

== Unknown date ==
List of shipwrecks: Unknown date in February 1838
Ship	State	Description
Actif	Norway	The ship was abandoned in the Atlantic Ocean.
Adelaide	United Kingdom	The ship was wrecked near Milford Haven, Pembrokeshire.
Advance	(United Kingdom of Great Britain and Ireland) New South Wales	The sloop was wrecked whilst on a voyage from Brisbane to Sydney.
Amaratta	France	The ship was driven ashore near Belfast, County Antrim, United Kingdom. Her crew were rescued.
Annan	United Kingdom	The ship was driven ashore at Newry, County Antrim. She was on a voyage from Sligo to Liverpool, Lancashire.
Armada	United Kingdom	The ship was driven ashore near Milford Haven, Pembrokeshire.
Bacchus	United Kingdom	The ship was abandoned in the Atlantic Ocean off the Eddystone Lighthouse. She was on a voyage from Newcastle upon Tyne, Northumberland to the Charente.
Betsey	United Kingdom	The collier was driven ashore at Whitby, Yorkshire. Her crew were rescued.
Bowans	United Kingdom	The ship was wrecked at Skerries, County Dublin with the loss of all hands.
Breeze	United Kingdom	The ship was driven ashore at Ballymooney, County Wexford. She was on a voyage from Swansea, Glamorgan to Wicklow.
Britannia	United Kingdom	The ship was abandoned in the Atlantic Ocean. Her crew were rescued by Clarisse (France). Britannia was on a voyage from Halifax, Nova Scotia, British North America to an English port.
Derwent	United Kingdom	The collier was driven ashore and wrecked at Whitby. Her crew were rescued.
Diana	United Kingdom	The ship was driven ashore at Margate, Kent. She was refloated on 20 February.
Diligence	United Kingdom	The ship was driven ashore near Milford Haven.
Elizabeth Gibbs	(United Kingdom of Great Britain and Ireland) New South Wales	The cutter capsized and sank whilst bound for Sydney.
Erin	United Kingdom	The ship was driven ashore and wrecked on the coast of County Waterford.
Fanny	United Kingdom	The ship foundered 1 nautical mile (1.9 km) south by east of Cork.
Friends	United Kingdom	The ship was driven ashore near Milford Haven. She was on a voyage from Youghal, County Cork to Bristol, Gloucestershire.
Friends	United Kingdom	The ship foundered. She was on a voyage from Limerick to Cardiff, Glamorgan.
Général Foy	France	The brig was abandoned in the Atlantic Ocean before 18 February. She was on a voyage from Guadeloupe to Havre de Grâce, Seine-Inférieure. Général Foy was later towed into St. Ives, Cornwall.
Harriet and Ann	United Kingdom	The ship was driven ashore near Milford Haven.
Harvest Home	United Kingdom	The ship was driven ashore in Restronguet Creek.
Hope	United Kingdom	The sloop was wrecked at Ardglass, County Down.
James Sayre	(United Kingdom of Great Britain and Ireland) British North America	The ship foundered before 17 February. Her crew were rescued by Mary ( (United Kingdom of Great Britain and Ireland) British North America).
John Harvey	United Kingdom	The ship foundered off the coast of County Cork.
Lucinda	United Kingdom	The whaler was struck a rock and sank off New Caledonia before 17 February. Her crew were rescued by Success (United Kingdom).
Lucy	United Kingdom	The ship was driven ashore near Milford Haven.
Margaret	United Kingdom	The schooner was driven ashore and wrecked at "Hawthorn Hive".
Oak	United Kingdom	The ship was wrecked on the Black Middens, in the North Sea off the coast of County Durham.
Orestes	United Kingdom	The ship was driven ashore near Arklow, County Wicklow. Her crew were rescued. She was on a voyage from Glasgow, Renfrewshire to Bristol.
Prima	United Kingdom	The ship was driven ashore at South Shields.
Providence	United Kingdom	The ship was abandoned at sea. She was subsequently taken into a port.
Providence	United Kingdom	The ship was wrecked in the Humber. Her crew were rescued.
Susanna and Mary	United Kingdom	The ship was wrecked at the entrance to Lough Foyle with the loss of all hands.
Thomas	United Kingdom	The schooner was wrecked at Ardglass.
Two Brothers	United Kingdom	The ship departed from Newport, Monmouthshire for Fowey, Cornwall. No further trace, presumed foundered with the loss of all hands.
Volusia	United Kingdom	The ship was wrecked at Skerries with the loss of all hands.
Young or Young Glasgow	United Kingdom	The sloop foundered off Morant Point, Jamaica before 15 February. Her crew were rescued.
