= Frances Keightley =

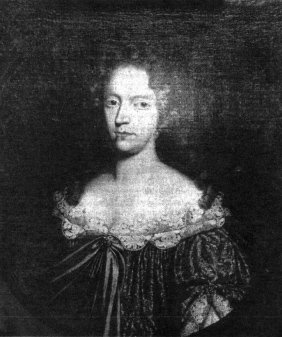
- Born: 1658
- Died: 1725 (aged 66–67)
- Spouse: Thomas Keightley
- Children: Catherine Keightley
- Parents: Edward Hyde, 1st Earl of Clarendon (father); Frances Hyde, Countess of Clarendon (mother)

Frances Keightley (1658–1725) was an English aristocrat from the Hyde family.

== Biography ==
Frances was the youngest daughter of Edward Hyde, 1st Earl of Clarendon and his second wife Frances Hyde, Countess of Clarendon. In 1675, she married Thomas Keightley. By 1682 they were living in Mallow, County Cork. They separated, meeting briefly in Dublin, in July 1684.

Frances appears to have had religious difficulties, she was in Glaslough, Ireland, in 1686, when she met the controversialist, Charles Leslie. It is believed that he wrote his Short and Easie Method with the Deists in 1698 to address her religious doubts. Afterwards, she was in London in 1687/8, where the last of her sons, Francis, died. She stayed with her brother Henry Hyde, 2nd Earl of Clarendon. Subsequently, she lived at Athelhampton House with her sister-in-law Mary Long (née Keightley), they both petitioned King William in 1701/2 to be absolved of fines for not attending church.

In January 1712/13, she met her husband again at Somerset House after an absence of twenty seven years. Her relatives believed that the long quarrel was due to the uncertainess of her temper and no fault of her husbands.

The couple's only child to survive to adulthood was Catherine who married Lucius O'Brien in 1701.

Frances wrote Advice to a Daughter, in which she urged her daughter to be very certain if she wanted to marry, and to read and learn as much as she could.
