= Massy baronets =

Extinct baronetcy in the Baronetage of Ireland

The Massy Baronetcy, of Donass in the County of Clare, was a title in the Baronetage of Ireland. It was created on 9 March 1782 for Hugh Massy, who represented County Clare in the Irish House of Commons. The second Baronet represented this constituency in both the Irish and the House of Commons of the United Kingdom. The title became extinct on the death of the third Baronet in 1870.

The first Baronet was the son of the Very Reverend Charles Massy, Dean of Limerick, brother of Colonel Hugh Massy, father of Hugh Massy, 1st Baron Massy, and Eyre Massey, 1st Baron Clarina.

== Massy baronets, of Donass (1782) ==
- Sir Hugh Dillon Massy, 1st Baronet (c. 1740–1807)
- Sir Hugh Dillon Massy, 2nd Baronet (1767–1842)
- Sir Hugh Dillon Massy, 3rd Baronet (1797–1870)

== See also ==
- Baron Massy
- Baron Clarina
