= Sir Edward O'Brien, 2nd Baronet =

Irish landowner and politician

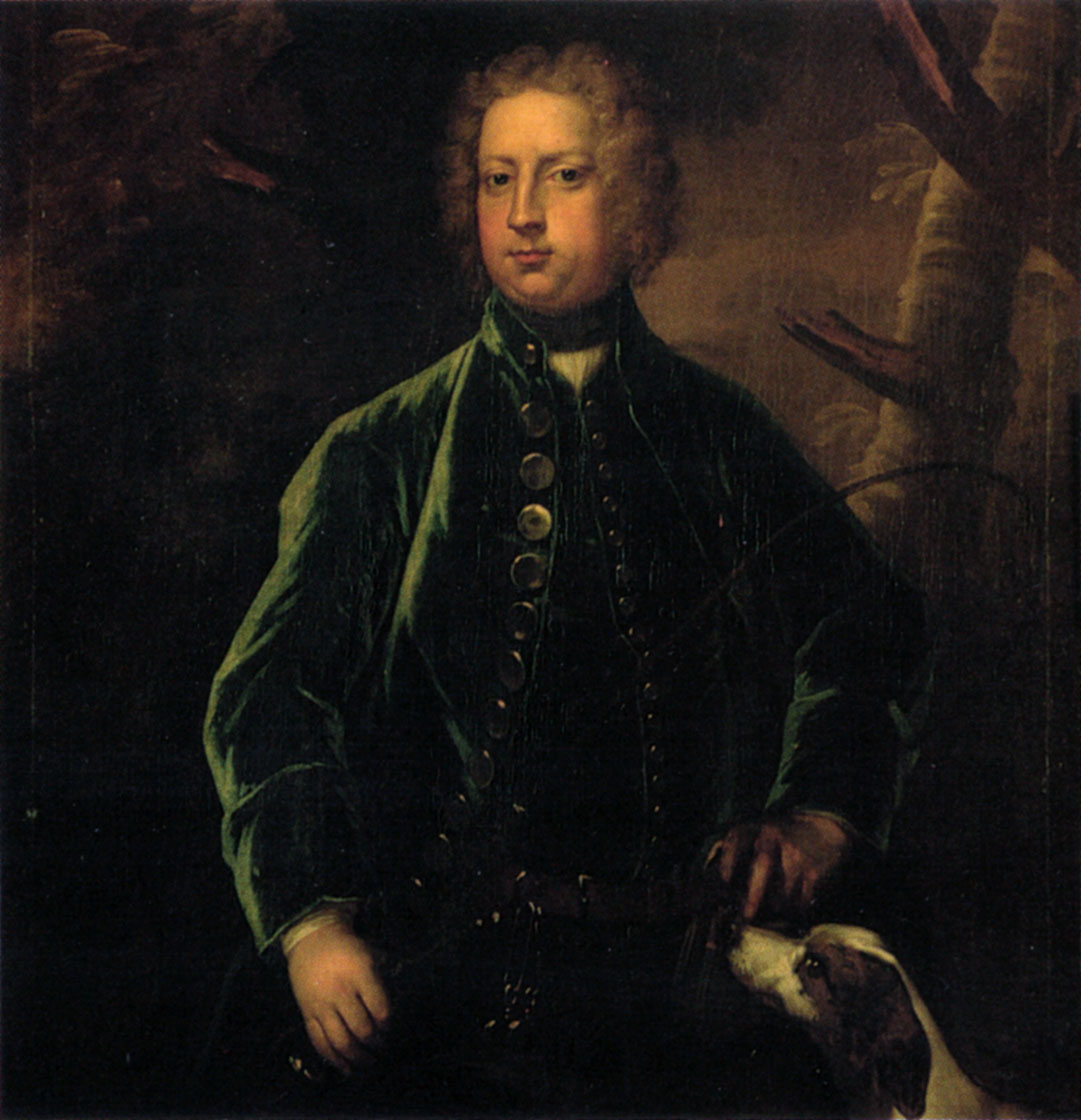

Member of the Irish Parliament for County Clare
- In office 1727–1765

Personal details
- Born: 7 April 1705
- Died: 26 November 1765 (aged 60)
- Spouse: Mary Hickman
- Children: 8, including Lucius
- Parent(s): Lucius O'Brien; Catherine Keightley

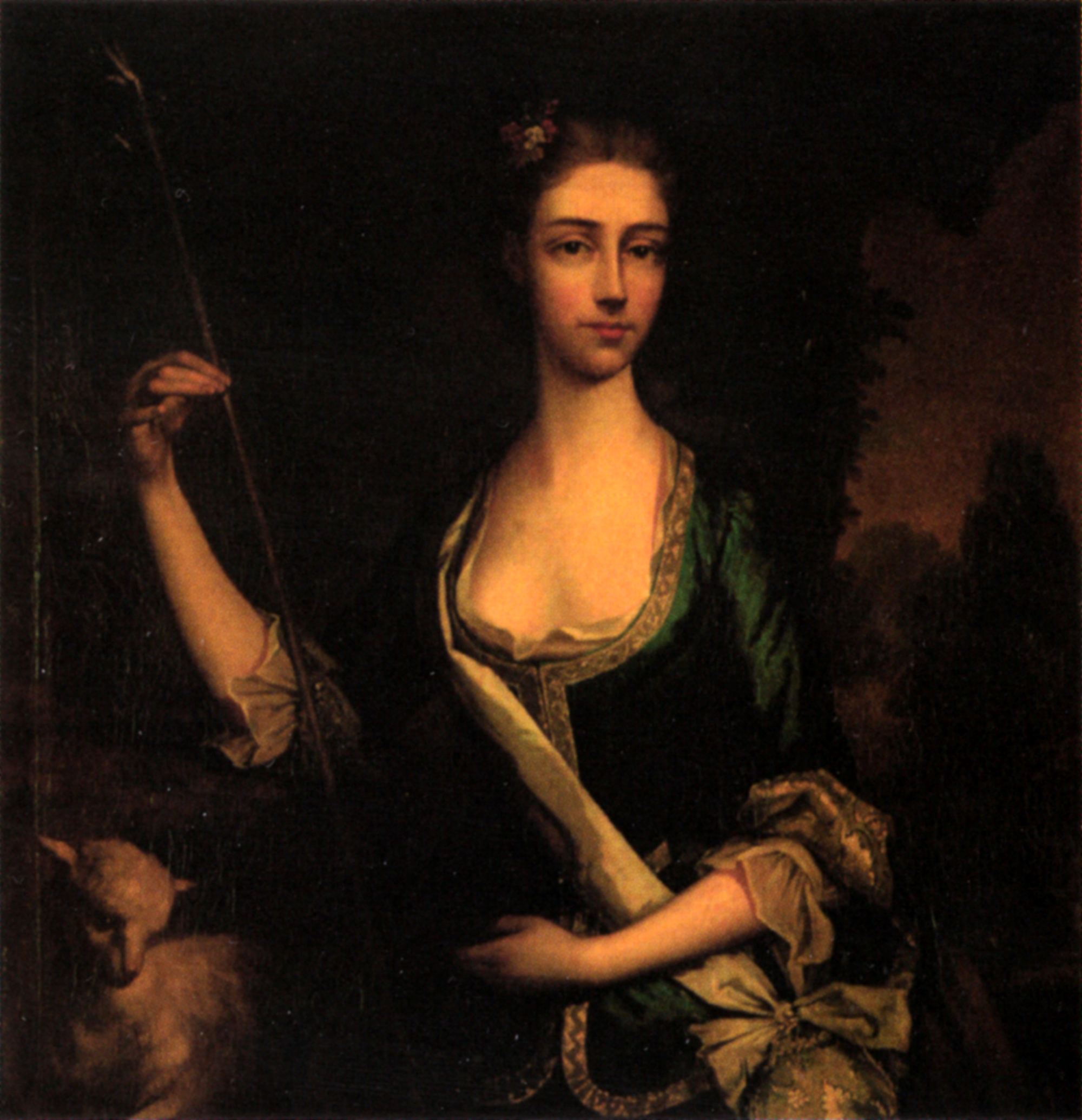
Mary Hickman, wife of Edward. Before her marriage she lived in Fenloe House, nearby to Dromoland. She is purported to have had a fortune of £20,000 before her marriage to Edward.

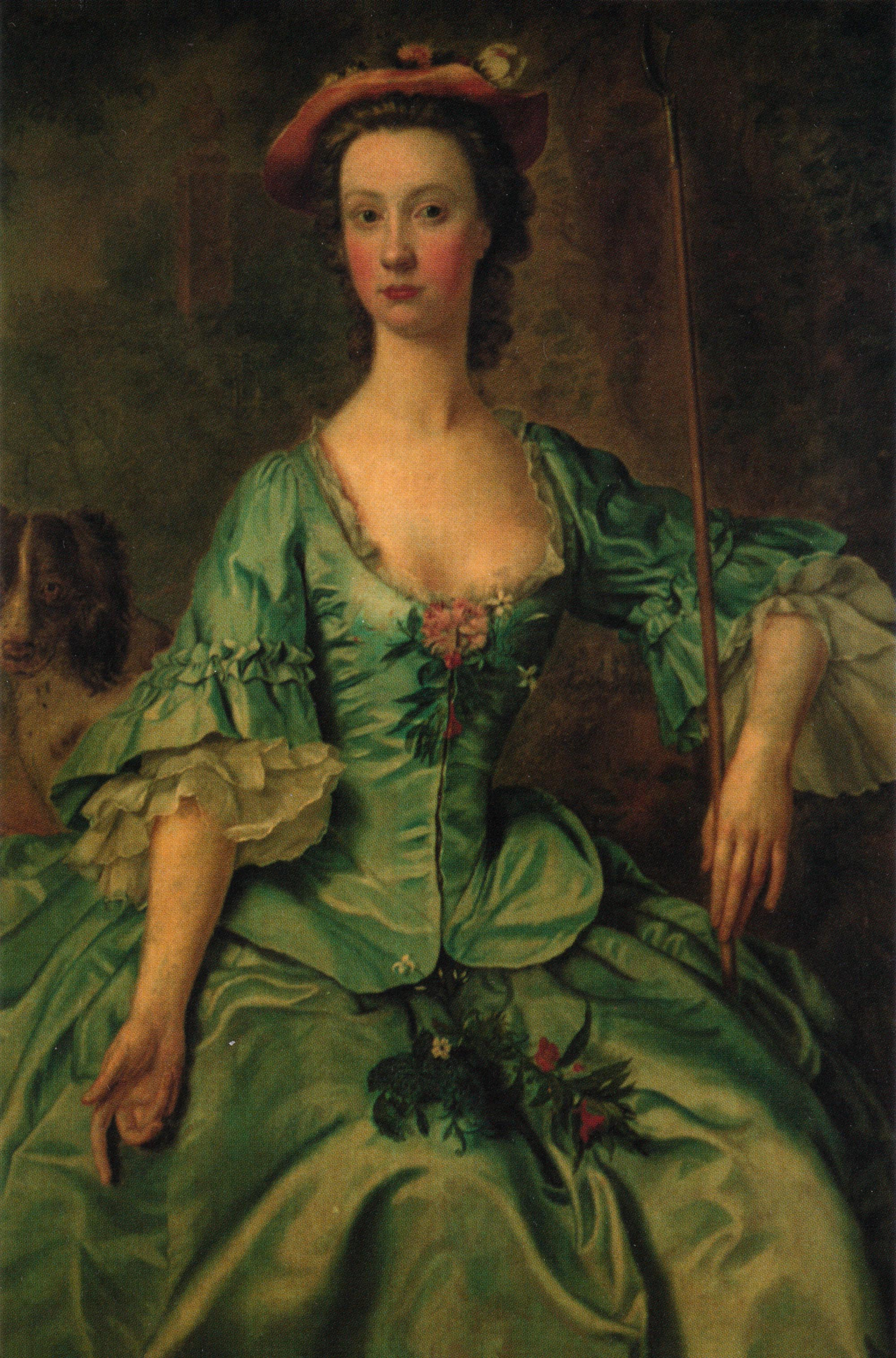
Henrietta O'Brien, circa 1730–1787, daughter of Edward O'Brien, 2nd Baronet and Mary Hickman, known to her friends as Harriet or Hatty. She never married.

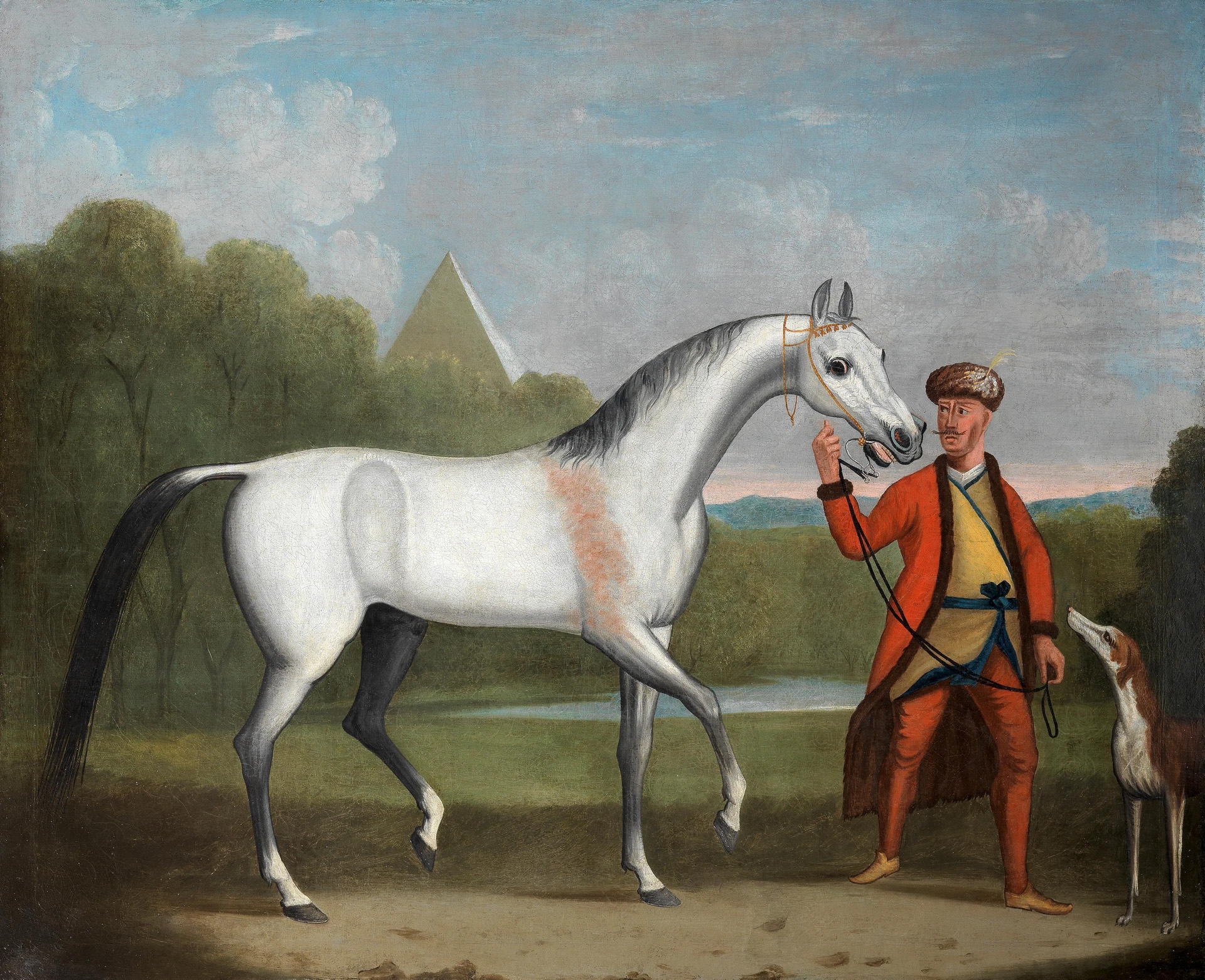
The Bloody Shouldered Arabian, race horse owned by Edward O'Brien.

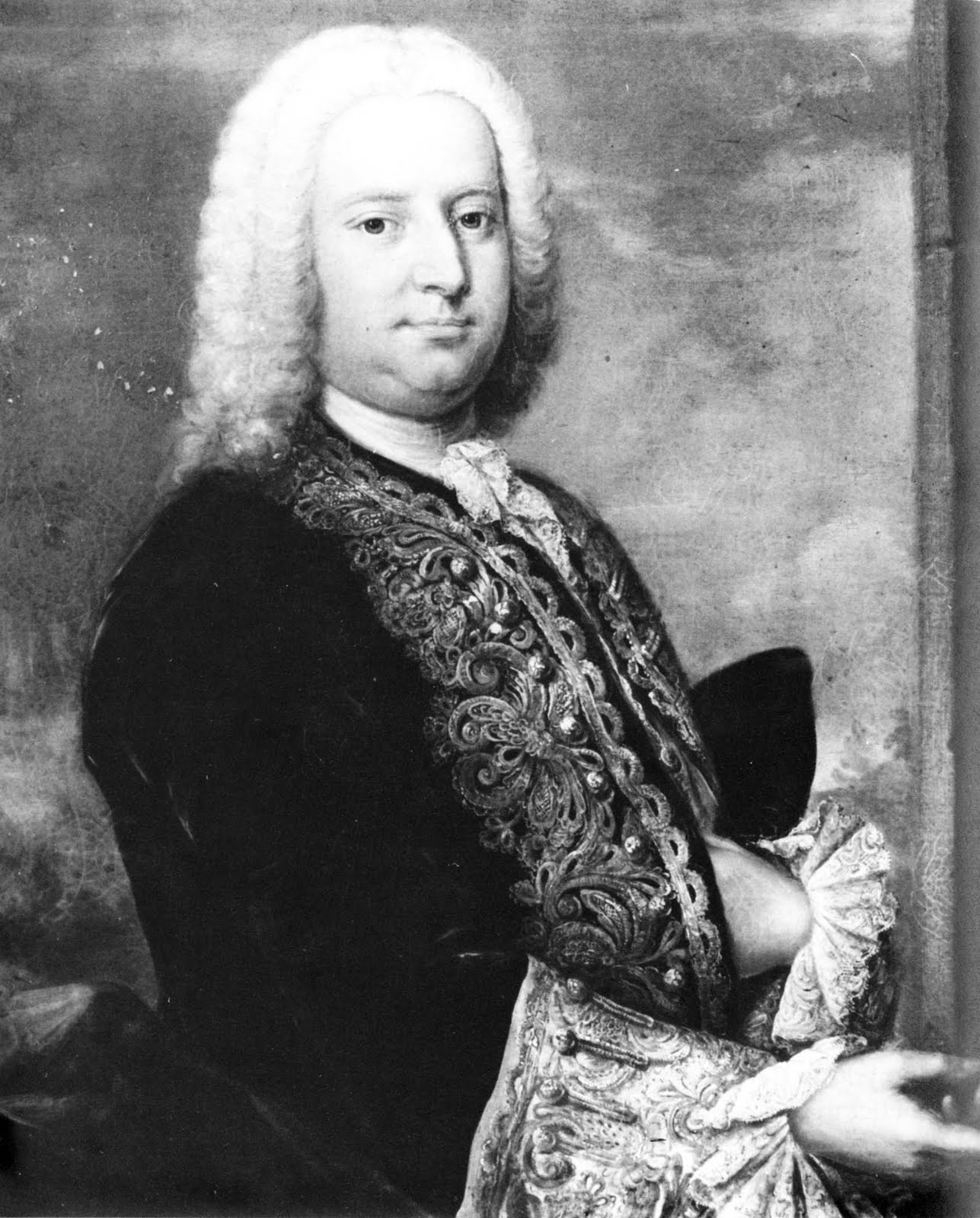
Sir Edward O'Brien, 2nd Baronet

Sir Edward O'Brien, 2nd Baronet (7 April 1705 – 26 November 1765) was an Irish politician and baronet.

== Life ==
Born in England in 1705, he was the eldest surviving child of Lucius O'Brien (1675–1717 d.v.p) and Catherine Keightley (1676- c. 1733). He would be followed by a younger brother Thomas and two sisters Anne and Lucia, who both died as children. He inherited the baronetcy from his grandfather Sir Donough O'Brien, 1st Baronet as his own father had pre-deceased him. His maternal grandmother, Lady Frances Keightley (née Hyde) was the sister of Anne Hyde Duchess of York who in turn was the mother of Queen Mary II and Queen Anne. Edward was raised first in Ireland, before attending Oxford.

He entered the Irish House of Commons in 1727, sitting for County Clare, the same constituency his grandfather had also represented, until his death in 1765.

Edward lived extravagantly and gambled heavily on horse races, destroying the wealth which his grandfather had so carefully built. When the last Earl of Thomond Henry O'Brien died he left his large estates to Murrough, the son of William O'Brien, 4th Earl of Inchiquin, with remainder to Percy Wyndham. Murrough in died in 1741 and the reversion became effective. When the Earl of Thomond was seeking an heir amongst his kinsmen, he could not select the Marshal of Thomond as he refused to turn Protestant. He did not choose Edward as his heir as he was living too extravagantly and thus left him out of his will. The fortunes of the Dromoland O'Briens would have been greatly enhanced had they inherited the Thomond estates.

== Issue ==
He married Mary Hickman in 1726 and together they had eight children:

- Sir Lucius O'Brien, 3rd Baronet.
- Donough O'Brien, married Mary, daughter of Richard Henn of Paradise, County Clare. Progenitor of Canadian branch of the family.
- Captain Edward O'Brien, married Charlotte, daughter of Thomas Hickman of Brickhill, County Clare and died in 1787.
- Henrietta, died unmarried.
- Anne, married Richard Dawson of Atherdee, brother of the 1st Viscount Cremorne.
- Mary, who married John Quin of Rossbrien and died in 1782.
- Katherine, who married Charles MacDonnell of Newhall (Killone).
- Lucy O'Brien, married Thomas Arthur of Glanmore in 1766.

== Ancestry ==
Ancestors of Sir Edward O'Brien, 2nd Baronet

8. Conor O'Brien
4. Sir Donough O'Brien, 1st Baronet
9. Máire Rua O'Brien
2. Lucius O'Brien
10. Sir George Hamilton, 1st Baronet, of Donalong
5. Lucia Hamilton
11. Mary Butler (daughter of Thomas Butler, Viscount Thurles)
1. Sir Edward O'Brien, 2nd Baronet
12. William Keightley
6. Thomas Keightley
13. Anne Williams
3. Catherine Keightley
14. Edward Hyde, 1st Earl of Clarendon
7. Frances Hyde
15. Frances Hyde, Countess of Clarendon

Parliament of Ireland
Preceded by George Purdon; John Ivers	Member of Parliament for County Clare; 1727–1765; With: Francis Burton 1727–1745; Robert Hickman 1745–1757; Murrough O'Brien 1757–1761; Francis Pierpoint Burton 1761–1765	Succeeded by Francis Pierpoint Burton; Charles MacDonnell
Baronetage of Ireland
Preceded by Donough O'Brien	Baronet (of Leaghmenagh); 1717–1765	Succeeded by Lucius O'Brien
