= Sir Edward O'Brien, 4th Baronet =

Irish politician

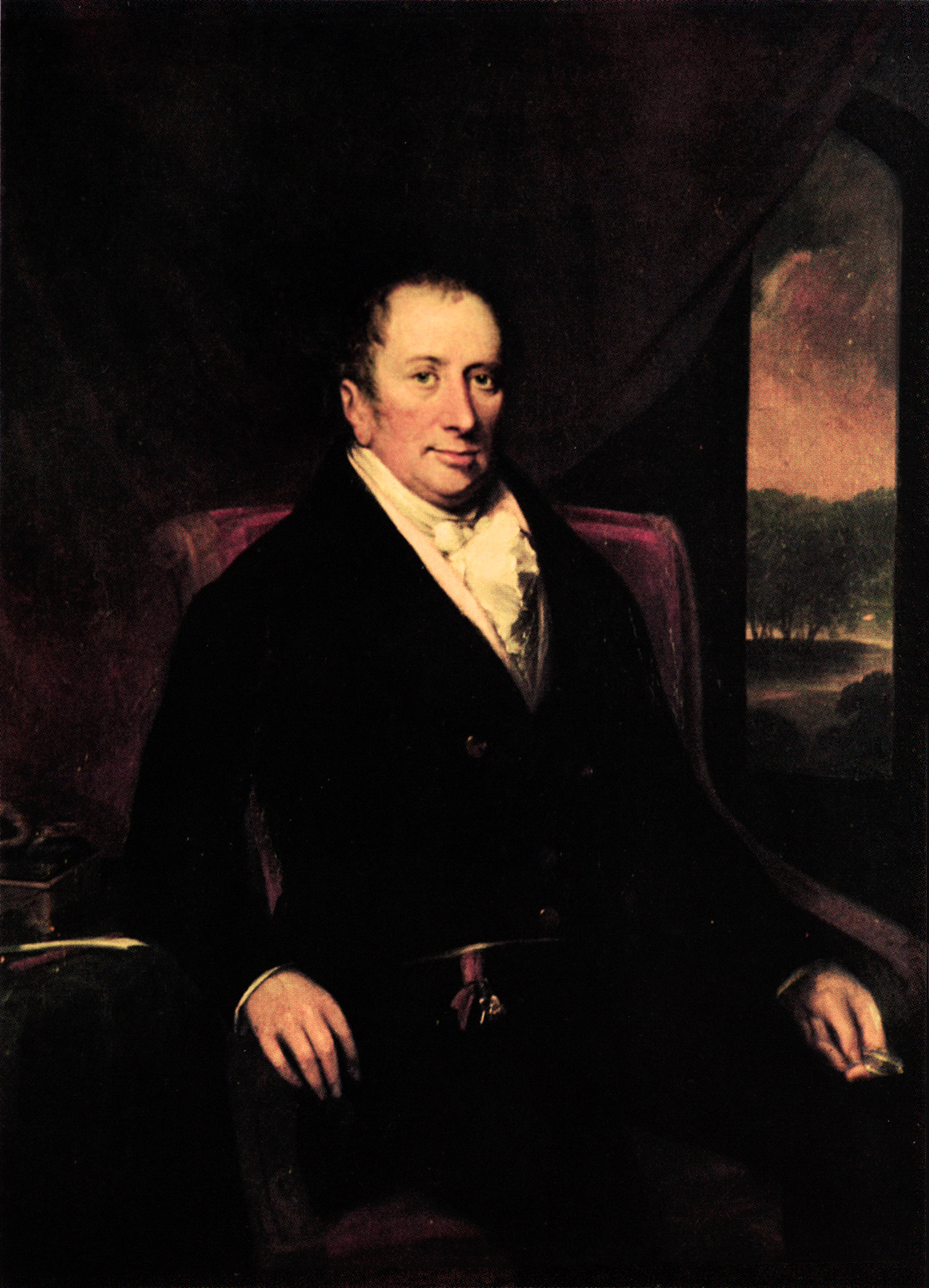
Sir Edward O'Brien, 4th Baronet

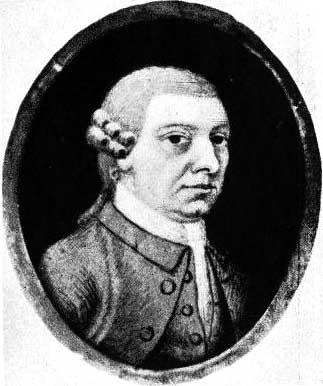
Edward married Charlotte Smith (1781–1856), co-heiress of wealthy attorney William Smith of Cahermoyle House, Limerick (pictured).

Sir Edward O'Brien, 4th Baronet (17 April 1773 – 13 March 1837) was an Irish parliamentarian who sat in the House of Commons of the United Kingdom from 1802 to 1826.

He was the son of Sir Lucius O'Brien, 3rd Baronet (1731–1795) and Anne French. On his father's death (possibly as the result of a duel), he inherited Sir Lucius' baronetcy and his seat in the Parliament of Ireland, representing Ennis from 1795 until the Union with Great Britain in 1801.

At the 1802 general election, O'Brien was elected as one of the two Members of Parliament (MPs) for County Clare. He was re-elected 5 times, holding the seat until the 1826 general election, which he did not contest.

He died on 13 March 1837 at age 63. He had married Charlotte Smith, daughter of William Smith, on 12 November 1799. Their children were given the rank of a Baron's child in 1862. Among them were:

- Lucius O'Brien, 13th Baron Inchiquin, who also succeeded his father, becoming 5th Baronet,
- William O'Brien
- Harriet Monsell.
- Anne Martineau

Baronetage of Ireland
| Preceded by Lucius O'Brien | Baronet (of Leaghmenagh); 1795–1837 | Succeeded by Lucius O'Brien |
Parliament of the United Kingdom
| Preceded by Francis Nathaniel Burton; Hugh Dillon Massy | Member of Parliament for County Clare; 1802–1826; With: Francis Nathaniel Burton to 1808; Augustine FitzGerald 1808–18; William Vesey-FitzGerald from 1818 | Succeeded by William Vesey-FitzGerald; Lucius O'Brien |
