= Thomas Burton Vandeleur =

Irish barrister and judge (c.1767–1835)

Thomas Burton Vandeleur (c.1767–1835) was an Irish barrister and judge.

He was born in Kilrush, County Clare to a prominent landowning family of Dutch origin, which settled at Kilrush in the 1680s, and did much to improve the town. He was a younger son of Crofton Vandeleur, member of the Irish House of Commons for Ennis, and his wife Alice Burton, daughter of Thomas Burton of Buncraggy and his wife Dorothy Forster (youngest daughter of Chief Justice John Forster). John Ormsby Vandeleur MP, who built Kilrush House in 1808, was his elder brother.

He was educated at Trinity College Dublin and entered Lincoln's Inn in 1785. The law was then a profession which was commonly pursued by younger sons of landed families: Thomas may also have been influenced by the fact that his mother's grandfather John Forster (1668-1720) was an eminent judge who held office as Chief Justice of the Irish Common Pleas.

He was called to the Irish Bar in 1790 and became King's Counsel in 1816. He was Third Serjeant-at-law (Ireland) from 1821 to 1822 and acted as an extra judge of assize in 1820. He was appointed a justice of the Court of King's Bench (Ireland) in 1822 and served on the Court until his death in 1835.

Elrington Ball described him as a popular and respected judge. However, the Vandeleur family subsequently became very unpopular, due to their notoriously harsh treatment of their tenants during the Great Irish Famine of the 1840s, and during the agrarian disturbances later in the century.
