= Edward FitzGerald (1738–1814) =

Irish politician

Edward FitzGerald (1738–1814) was an Irish politician. He was sat in the Irish House of Commons as a Member of Parliament (MP) for County Clare from 1776 to 1790, and as MP for Castlebar from 1790 to 1797.

His son Augustine FitzGerald (c.1765–1834) sat in the House of Commons of the United Kingdom MP for County Clare from 1808 to 1818, and as MP for Ennis briefly in early 1832.

Parliament of Ireland
Preceded by Francis Pierpoint Burton; Sir Lucius Henry O'Brien, 3rd Bt	Member of Parliament for County Clare; 1783–1790; With: Hugh Dillon Massy 1776–1778; Sir Lucius Henry O'Brien, 3rd Bt 1778–1783; Sir Hugh Dillon Massy, 1st Bt 1783–1790	Succeeded by Francis Nathaniel Burton; Francis McNamara
Preceded by James Browne; Thomas Warren	Member of Parliament for Castlebar; 1790–1797; With: John Francis Cradock	Succeeded by Thomas Lindsay; Denis Browne
