= Portlick Castle =

Medieval castle in Westmeath, Ireland

Coordinates: 53.4952°N 7.9121°W

Portlick Castle is a late medieval tower house castle near the village of Glasson, County Westmeath, Ireland. It is located approximately 6 miles from Athlone on the shores of Lough Ree. It comprises a square late medieval 4-storey stone tower with an attached 2-storey Georgian wing and Victorian tower.

== History ==
Sir Henry de Leon, accompanied Prince John (later King John) of England to Ireland, after the initial invasion by the Earl of Pembroke (Strongbow) back in 1169, and was granted large areas of land in the Westmeath area. The surname eventually evolved from De-lee-on to Di-lee-on to Dillon. The Irish language version of this surname is "Diolun". A branch of the Dillons was granted the lands of Portlick and probably constructed the medieval motte located nearby. This would have been their primary fortification and probable residence until the castle was constructed in c. 1500. From then on they resided at the castle until 1696 when Garrett Dillon, former Recorder of Dublin, was attainted under the Articles of Limerick and forced to flee to France, where he died a few years later. It was then granted to Thomas Keightly, a member of King William's privy council, who in turn sold it to William Palmer of Dublin.

Subsequently, the grant was repudiated and the property repossessed by the crown to be sold to the Reverend Robert Smyth (Smith) in 1703. A member of the Smyth family lived in Portlick Castle until 1955. The Smyths built the Georgian residential wing and in 1860 Robert Ralph Smyth then built a castellated 3-storey tower block at the front of the Georgian addition to give the building its current twin tower appearance.

According to articles in The Westmeath Independent, Portlick Castle "was burned down on Wednesday, July 17, 1861", with loss of thousands of pounds worth of plates, furniture and books, and was uninhabitable when bought in 1988 by the Australian poet Luke Whitington, an art patron and an experienced restorer of derelict buildings in Italy. He extensively re-roofed and refurbished Portlick's buildings, with final council certification as fit for habitation obtained in 2000.

In 2012, the entire castle could be rented during forty-six weeks in the year for 1,000 euros per night, and was also for sale, including 27 acres of land. As of 2019, Portlick Castle was owned by Whitington and let as a private residence. In 2020, the castle was still listed as "for sale". In early 2021, the castle was officially sold to an Irish-American family from California.

== Ghost stories ==
According to local lore, Portlick Castle, Kilkenny Castle, Monkstown Castle (Cork), the Sharon Rectory, and the Workhouse Museum in Derry are said to be haunted by a "Blue Lady" ghost.
