= Adrian (1819 ship) =

History

United Kingdom
- Name: Adrian
- Builder: T. & W. Smith (or William Smith & Co), St. Peter's, Newcastle upon Tyne
- Launched: 1819
- Fate: Foundered 10 December 1833

General characteristics
- Tons burthen: 373, or 374 (bm)
- Length: 102 ft 10 in (31.3 m)
- Beam: 28 ft 10 in (8.8 m)
- Complement: 29 (1830)

Adrian was launched in 1819 at Newcastle upon Tyne. She initially sailed between London and Canada but then in 1822 she started sailing east of the Cape of Good Hope under a license from the British East India Company. She made voyages to Bengal and Batavia. In between, she transported convicts to New South Wales. She foundered in 1833.

== Career ==
Adrian first appeared in Lloyd's Register (LR) in 1820 with Johnston, master, Smith & Co., owners, and trade London, changing to London–New Brunswick.

In 1813 the EIC had lost its monopoly on the trade between India and Britain. British ships were then free to sail to India or the Indian Ocean under a license from the EIC. LR for 1822 showed Adrian's master changing from R. Johnston to J. Horn and her trade from London–Quebec to London–Bombay.

On 31 March 1822 Captain Horn sailed Adrian for Bengal. She had sailed from Deal on 1 March, but then had had to put back again. While she was at Deal heavy seas cost her and some other vessels their anchors. By 18 March she was at Portsmouth, and she sailed from there on the 28th. She arrived at Bengal on 14 August. By 3 March 1824, she was back at Portsmouth.

LR for 1823 showed Adrian with Horn, master, changing to P. Gordon, Smith & Co, owners, changing to A. Gordon, and trade London–Bengal, changing to London–New South Wales. On 9 October Adrian, Gordon, master, returned to Gravesend from Teneriffe. On 14 October she sailed for Van Diemen's Land. On 3 November she had to put into Falmouth having lost her foremast, bowsprit, and other gear. She sailed again on 9 November.

Adrian arrived at Hobart on 12 May 1824. Among her passengers were Colonel George Arthur and his wife and family. Colonel Arthur came to take up his position of Lieutenant-Governor of Van Diemen's Land. Adrian had sailed via Gibraltar, Rio de Janeiro, and Cape Town (4–9 March). From Hobart Adrian sailed on to Sydney, where she arrived on 11 June. She sailed for Madras and Bengal on 11 August. She arrived at Bengal on 1 November. She sailed from Bengal on 20 April 1825, the Sand Heads on 5 May, and St Helena on 23 August. She arrived at Deal on 26 August.

Adrian then sailed again for New South Wales. LR for 1827 showed her with S. Brown, master, J. Bentman, owner, and trade London–New south Wales. She arrived in Sydney in October 1826. The Sydney Gazette and New South Wales Advertiser had a detailed manifest for the cargo Adrian, Stephen Brown, master, brought with her.

Adrian returned to England via Batavia, which she left on 6 April 1827. She arrived at Portsmouth on 10 August. LL reported on 8 October 1827 that on her way between Batavia and England she rescued the master of Sir Francis N. Burton, which had wrecked on the Keeling Islands.

LR for 1830 showed Adrian's master changing from Graham to Sadler. Her owner was J.Row, and her trade was London transport.

=== Convict transport ===
Adrian, William Sadler, master, departed Portsmouth on 27 April 1830. She arrived at Sydney on 20 August. She had embarked 169 male convicts and had one convict death on the voyage.

The Register of Shipping (RS) for 1833 showed Adrian's master changing from Cromartie, but the new master's name is illegible. Her owner was Nelson, and her trade changed from London–Barbados to London–Bermuda.

== Fate ==
Adrian, Foster, master, foundered in the Atlantic Ocean (45°55′N 13°00′W). James Dunn rescued her crew. Adrian was on a voyage from Quebec City to London.
