= Sir Francis N. Burton (1825 ship (1)) =

History

United Kingdom
- Name: Sir Francis N. Burton
- Namesake: Francis Nathaniel Burton
- Builder: Finch's yard, Saint-Roch, Quebec City, or Deschambault-Grondines, Quebec,
- Launched: October 1825
- Fate: Wrecked 7 November 1829
- Notes: The smallest in burthen of three vessels named Sir Francis N. Burton launched in Quebec in 1825. This has led to some possible confusion.

General characteristics
- Tons burthen: 110, or 124, or 125, or 126 (bm)
- Notes: Three vessels named Sir Francis N. Burton were launched in Quebec in 1825. This has led to some possible confusion.

Sir Francis N. Burton was launched in 1825 at Quebec. She sailed to England where she assumed English registry, and then traded between London and Central America. Pirates captured and plundered her in 1827, but the British Royal Navy recovered her, the recovery leading to a court case for salvage. New owners started trading with the Baltic, where she was wrecked in 1829.

== Career ==
Sir Francis N. Burton first appeared in Lloyd's Register (LR) in 1826 with Baker, owner, and trade London–Vera Cruz. She assumed British registry on 6 January 1826. The Register of Shipping for 1827 showed Baker as master and owner, the master changing to Hare, and the ownership changing to Baker & Co. The entry carried the notation "badly built".

Year	Master	Owner	Trade	Source
1828	Hare	Baker	London–Vera Cruz	LR
1830	J.Cliburn	Dobson & Co.	Cowes	LR

In 1827 pirates captured Sir Francis N. Burton, Hare, master. She was anchored in the port of Sagua, Cuba when pirates attacked her. The crew succeeded in repelling them but Hare was injured and taken up to Sagua La Grande. The next day the pirates attacked again. The pirates succeeded in driving off the crew and taking the ship, which they plundered. The boats of HMS Espiegle, Commander Yates, retrieved Sir Francis N. Burton on 16 January 1827. Over the next two weeks Yates and his men retrieved the crew, fixed the sails, refitted the ship, and at Hare's request, conveyed her some 80 miles (130 km) to a safe anchorage. Yates claimed salvage at Havana. The consignees of Sir Francis N. Burton agreed to valuation and arbitration by a three-man board, which included the Lloyd's agent at Havana. The board valued the ship at £780 and awarded salvage of one-third. The consignees decided that she had required such heavy expenses that she could not pay the salvage. They gave up her papers to the salvors and instructed them to contact the owners. She was sold for £600. On 28 April the High Court of Admiralty in London awarded Espiegle £200.

== Fate ==
On 7 November 1829 Sir Francis N. Burton, Clibbens, master, was driven ashore near "Polagna", Russia with the loss of a crew member. She was on a voyage from Saint Petersburg, Russia.
