= Sir Francis N. Burton (1825 ship (2)) =

History

United Kingdom
- Name: Sir Francis N. Burton
- Namesake: Francis Nathaniel Burton
- Launched: 1825, Quebec
- Fate: Wrecked 5 December 1826

General characteristics
- Tons burthen: 190, or 290 (bm)
- Sail plan: Snow
- Notes: The middle in burthen of three vessels named Sir Francis N. Burton launched in Quebec in 1825. This has led to some possible confusion.

Sir Francis N. Burton was launched in 1825 at Quebec. She was wrecked on 5 December 1826 on a voyage for the British East India Company (EIC).

Sir Francis N. Burton was re-registered at London on 27 May 1826. She first appeared in Lloyd's Register (LR) in 1826 with J.Martin, master, Grayham, owner, and trade London. She had damages repaired in 1826.

In 1813 the EIC had lost its monopoly on the trade between India and Britain. British ships were then free to sail to India or the Indian Ocean under a license from the EIC. "Sir F.N.Burton", J. Martin, master, sailed from England on 1 August 1826 bound for Bengal.

Fate: Sir Francis N. Burton, Martin, master, was wrecked in the Keeling Islands with the loss of three lives. She was on a voyage from the Cape of Good Hope to Bengal. LL reported on 8 October 1827 that Adrian had rescued the master.
