= Catherine Keightley =

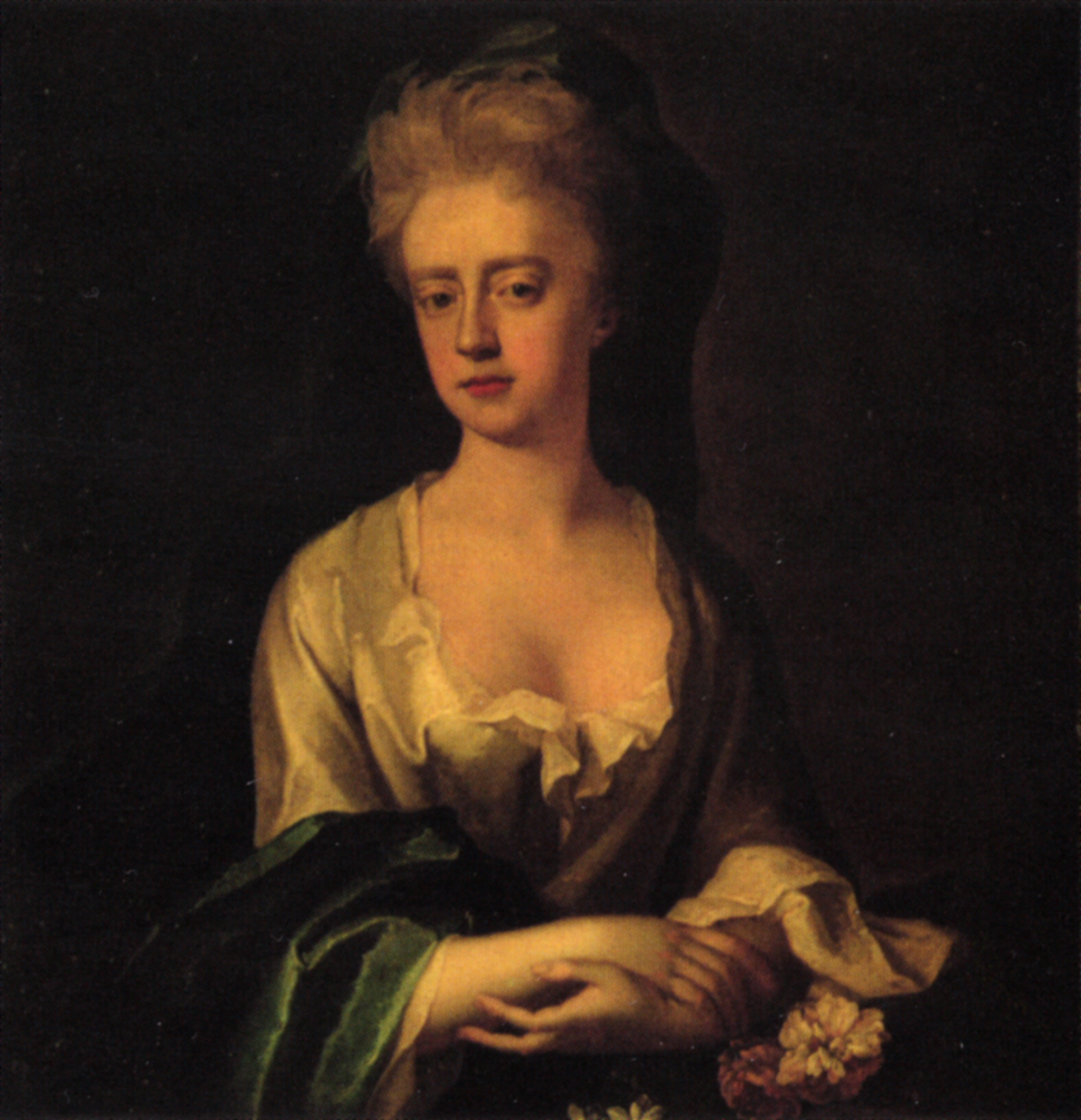
- Born: 1676
- Died: 1730 (aged 53–54)
- Spouse: Lucius O'Brien
- Children: 4, including Edward
- Parents: Thomas Keightley (father); Frances Keightley (mother)

Catherine Keightley (1676–1730) was an English aristocrat who lived in Ireland, from the Keightley family.

== Biography ==
Catherine Keightley was born in 1676 to Thomas Keightley and his wife, Frances Keightley.

In 1701, she married Lucius O'Brien, a marriage that brought close favour to the O'Brien's during to the Williamite War in Ireland, as Catherine was a close relation to both monarchs.

They had four children

- Sir Edward O'Brien, 2nd Baronet
- Thomas O'Brien
- Anne
- Lucia
