= Lucius O'Brien (died 1717) =

Irish nobleman

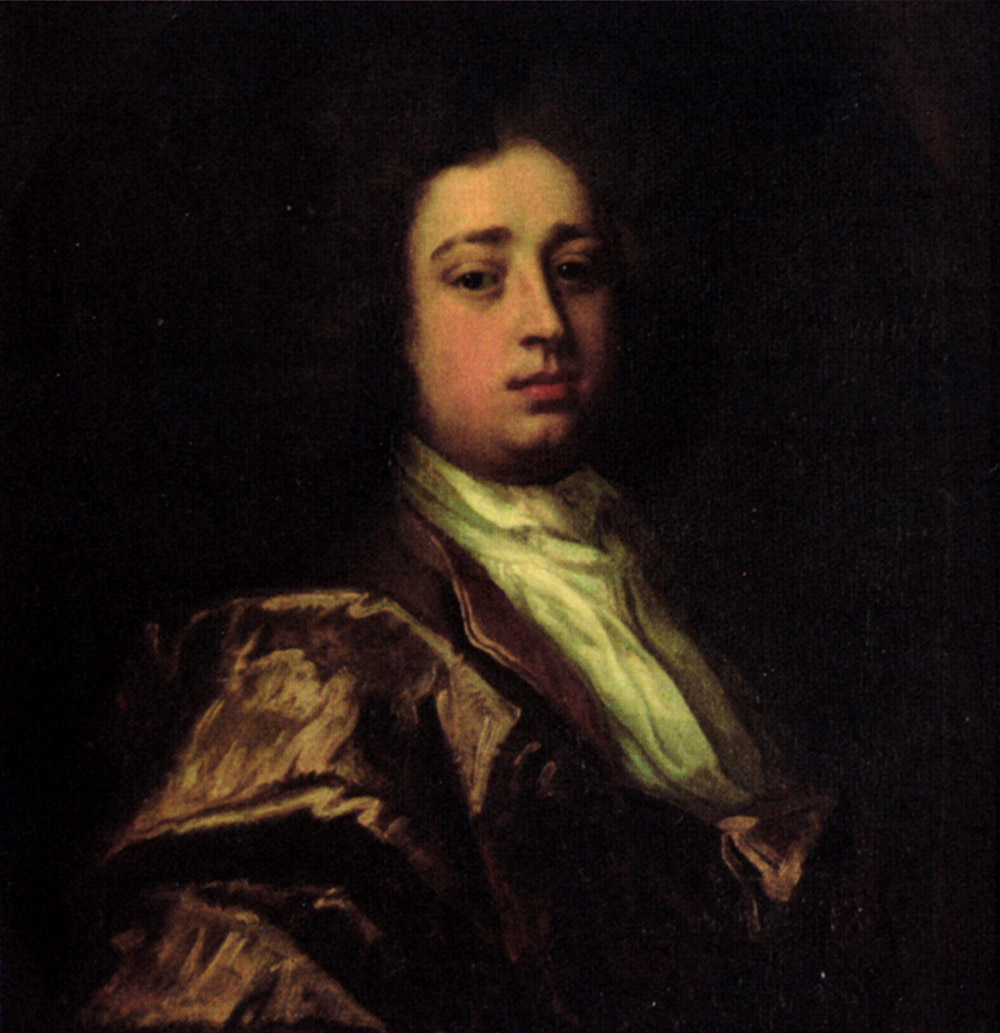
- Portrait of Lucius which hangs in Dromoland Castle.
- Born: 1675; Dromoland Castle
- Died: 6 January 1717 (aged 41–42); Paris, France
- Spouse: Catherine Keightley
- Issue: Edward O'Brien; Thomas O'Brien (died 1727); Anne (died young); Lucia (died young)
- Father: Sir Donough O'Brien, 1st Baronet
- Mother: Lucia Hamilton

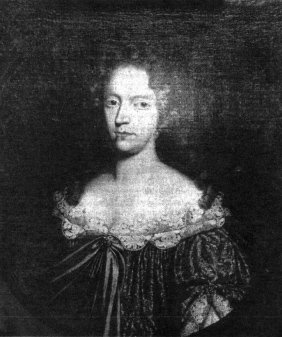
Lady Frances Keightley (1658-1725) née Hyde. Lucius had visited her and described that she "had given my Irish pride a lick with the rough side of her tongue without making the least allowance for laziness, gout or any other disability."

Lucius O'Brien (1675–1717) was an Irish nobleman of the O'Brien family of Dromoland.

== Early life ==
He was the son of Donat O'Brien, 1st Baronet and Lucia Hamilton, the daughter of Sir George Hamilton. His father sent him to England for further education aged 18 where he was enrolled in Mr. Foubert’s Academy in London's Brewer Street, off Golden Square.

== Married Life ==
After the consideration of other candidates, it was decided he would marry Catherine Keightley, the daughter of Thomas Keightley an English courtier and official in Ireland who had links to Queen Anne through his marriage to her aunt Frances, a daughter of Edward Hyde, 1st Earl of Clarendon.

Lucius and Catherine were married in the early months of 1701, "according to the rights and ceremonies of the Church of Ireland", and the Agreement was signed by Donat his friend Sir Thomas Southwell, Simon Purdon and Henry, Lord Shelbourne. The couple started their married life at Stonehall, a property belonging to Donat, and which a short time later became the residence of Henry and Susannah Stafford O'Brien.

On 7 April 1705, Catherine and Lucius' first son, Edward, was born.

In 1707 Lucius became a Member of Parliament for Clare.

Lucius accumulated heavy debts of over £3,000 and despite numerous visits to the court, and even a private interview with the Queen, he was not able to secure the governorship of the Bahamas which he craved.

Lucius accidentally killed his friend Colonel Hickman, and was to be tried for it. The trial took place at the Old Bailey, in London, in September 1713, with a great crowd of his friends present and he was acquitted. "So much joy and satisfation was shown in every face for the right that was done to Mr. O'Brien," wrote Thomas.

On 1 August 1714, Queen Anne was dead at the age of forty-nine. With her died the hopes and aspirations of Lucius and Catherine. When the new king, George I arrived in England from Hanover, he brought his own retinue of attendants and favourites, which did not include Queen Sophia, who was in prison on a charge of adultery. It was obvious that Lucius’ hopes of a job or a pension were dashed.

== Decline and Death ==
In 1715 Lucius broke his arm and visited a bone setter, he made sure his own doctor from Ireland, Denis Hickie (the Hickey's were hereditary physicians of the O'Briens), was present. He was unable to pay the £20 he owed to the doctor.

On 1 July 1716 Lucius left Southampton without telling his family, taking Dr. Hickie, and sailed to Jersey. They moved on to St. Malo and travelled to Rennes in Brittany, and on to Nantes. They then travelled to Bordeaux. He discovered his mother's uncles, the Hamiltons were there together with Lord Mar. Afraid of being discovered they moved on via the river Loire and arrived in Paris in October. There they stayed in the Hotel d'Avignon on the Rue de Toumon, near Luxembourg House, and Lucius gave his name as Mr. James Osbourn. Feeling again that he might he discovered in so public a place, he and Dr. Hickie went to Versailles, "where he was taken with a mighty Melancholy which made him desire the Dr. to leave him alone, & come to Paris, which he did for 3 weeks". To get over the depression he returned to Versailles, where, "being a lover of architecture and statuary, he amused him self about the Improvements & finery".

He then became ill with a fever, together with gout and convulsions, and was rushed back to Paris, where French doctors and Dr. Hickie attended him. Convinced that he was going to die, he wrote a Will in the presence of Mr. Daniel Arthur, a banker, whose brothers he made Executors as they were friends of his in London. His convulsions got worse, "and at last came to an ulcer in his Liver". None of the doctors could save him, even though he was "under the care of Monsieur Chiracy who was the Regent’s fine physician, and Monsieur de Farcy who was the most famous old Practitioner in Paris". He was given the last Sacrament by the Reverend S. Green, a clergyman in Paris, before his death at noon on Sunday 6 January 1717. He had been ill for nine weeks.

The difficulty then was where to bury him. As he was a Protestant, the Roman Catholic French would not allow him to have a Christian burial in a graveyard. In the end, as his friend, Jim Macnamara, described, he was "bury’d after a most despicable manner about 12 a’clock the ensueing night, being carry’d in a Dung Cart into a garden wherein the Swedish envoy has priveledge to have his people interr’d." It is not possible to find the location of the Swedish property, as the civil papers relating to Paris and its suburbs were accidentally burnt. The French authorities immediately sealed up the room where Lucius had died, together with its contents.

== Family ==
He married Catherine Keightley, daughter of Thomas Keightley and Frances, youngest daughter of Edward Hyde, 1st Earl of Clarendon and aunt of Queens Mary and Anne. He had children:

- Edward O'Brien
- Thomas O'Brien (died 1727)
- Anne (died young)
- Lucia (died young)

== Ancestry ==
Ancestors of Lucius O'Brien (died 1717)

16. Conor O'Brien
8. Sir Donough O'Brien
17. Slaney O'Brien
4. Conor O'Brien
18. Richard Wingfield
9. Honora Wingfield
2. Sir Donough O'Brien, 1st Baronet
20. Sir Teige McMahon
10. Sir Turlogh McMahon
5. Máire Rua McMahon
22. Connor O'Brien, 3rd Earl of Thomond
11. Mary O'Brien
23. Una O'Brien
1. Sir Edward O'Brien, 2nd Baronet
24. Claud Hamilton, 1st Lord Paisley
12. James Hamilton, 1st Earl of Abercorn
25. Margaret Seton
6. Sir George Hamilton, 1st Baronet
26. Thomas Boyd, 6th Lord Boyd
13. Marion Boyd
27. Margaret Campbell
3. Lucia Hamilton
28. Walter Butler, 11th Earl of Ormond
14. Thomas Butler, Viscount Thurles
29. Helen Butler
7. Mary Butler
30. Sir John Poyntz
15. Elizabeth Poyntz
31. Elizabeth Sydenham
