= Crofton Vandeleur =

Irish politician (1735–1794)

Crofton Vandeleur (1735–1794) was an Irish politician. He sat in the Irish House of Commons from 1768 to 1776 as a Member of Parliament (MP) for the borough of Ennis in County Clare.

He was the son of John Vandeleur of Kilrush and Frances Ormsby, daughter of John Ormsby of Cloghans, County Mayo. The Vandeleurs were a family of Dutch origin, who settled in Ireland in the 1630s, living first at Newmarket on Fergus. They moved to Kilrush in the late 1680s and became prosperous landowners in the region. They did much to improve the town of Kilrush, but later became very unpopular due to their harsh treatment of their tenants during the Great Hunger of the 1840s.

He married Alice, second daughter of Thomas Burton of Buncraggy and Dorothy Forster, daughter of John Forster, Chief Justice of the Irish Common Pleas, and had several children, including John Ormsby Vandeleur MP, and Thomas Burton Vandeleur, a justice of the Court of King's Bench (Ireland).

Parliament of Ireland
Preceded by Thomas Burton; Lucius Henry O'Brien	Member of Parliament for Ennis; 1776–1783; With: Charles McDonnell	Succeeded by William Buron; Sir Lucius Henry O'Brien, 3rd Bt
