= Sir Francis Burton (1825 ship (3)) =

History

United Kingdom
- Name: Sir Francis N. Burton
- Namesake: Francis Nathaniel Burton
- Builder: Quebec
- Launched: July 1825
- Fate: Wrecked 16 February 1838
- Notes: The largest in burthen of three vessels named Sir Francis N. Burton launched in Quebec in 1825. This has led to some possible confusion.

General characteristics
- Tons burthen: 410, or 411 (bm)

Sir Francis N. Burton was launched in 1825 at Quebec. She made several voyages to India under a license from the EIC. She was wrecked on 16 February 1838.

== Career ==
Sir Francis N. Burton first appeared in Lloyd's Register (LR) in 1826 with F. Boston, master, Pickth__ (or Peckerhance), owner, and trade Liverpool–Quebec. She assumed British registry on 5 October 1827. In 1827 Her master changed to J.White.

Year	Master	Owner	Trade	Source
1828	J.White; A.Reed	"Pekrhnce"	Liverpool–Quebec	LR
1830	A.Reid	Gibb & Co.	Greenock–Bombay	LR

Captain Reed sailed from England on 17 October 1832, bound for Bombay. In 1833 the EIC gave up its maritime business. Thereafter, vessels trading between the United Kingdom and India or China no longer required a license from the EIC.

Year	Master	Owner	Trade	Source
1834	W.Dunbar; F.Scott	D.Gibb	Liverpool–Africa	LR; homeport Liverpool
1837	F.Scott	D.Gibb	Liverpool–Africa	LR; homeport Liverpool

== Fate ==
On 16 February 1838, Sir Francis Burton was totally lost in Ardmore Bay, (51°57′N 7°43′W), Ardmore, County Waterford, near Youghal. She was sailing from Liverpool to Demerara, now in Guyana, with a general cargo. By one report her crew were saved; by another, all 13 hands perished. Earlier, apparently the East India Company turned her down when her owners would not make necessary improvements.
