= Sir Hugh Massy, 2nd Baronet =

Anglo-Irish politician (died 1842)

Sir Hugh Dillon Massy, 2nd Baronet (9 November 1767 – 28 March 1842) was an Anglo-Irish politician and baronet.

Massy was the son of Sir Hugh Massy, 1st Baronet and Elizabeth Stacpoole. In 1797 he was elected to the Irish House of Commons as the Member of Parliament for County Clare, and sat for the seat until its abolition under the Acts of Union 1800. He was returned to the House of Commons of the United Kingdom as the MP for County Clare in 1801, but lost his seat in the 1802 United Kingdom general election. On 29 April 1807 he succeeded to his father's baronetcy.

He married Sarah Hankey, daughter of Thomas Hankey and Mary Wyver, on 14 May 1796.

Parliament of Ireland
Preceded by Francis Nathaniel Burton; Francis McNamara	Member of Parliament for County Clare; 1797–1800; With: Francis Nathaniel Burton	Succeeded by Parliament of the United Kingdom
Parliament of the United Kingdom
Preceded by Parliament of Ireland	Member of Parliament for County Clare; 1801–1802; With: Francis Nathaniel Burton	Succeeded by Francis Nathaniel Burton; Sir Edward O'Brien, Bt.
Baronetage of Ireland
Preceded by Hugh Dillon Massy	Baronet (of Donass); 1807–1842	Succeeded by Hugh Dillon Massy
