= County Clare (Parliament of Ireland constituency) =

Pre-1801 Irish constituency

Coordinates: 52°53′58.95″N 9°7′10.28″W

- Former county constituency for the Irish House of Commons
- County: County Clare

–1801
- Seats: 2
- Replaced by: County Clare (UKHC)

County Clare was a constituency representing County Clare in the Irish House of Commons, the lower house in the Parliament of the Kingdom of Ireland. It returned two members to the Parliament of Ireland from 1613 to 1800.

In the Patriot Parliament of 1689 summoned by James II, Clare was represented with two members.

Following the Acts of Union 1800, it was succeeded by the County Clare constituency in the United Kingdom House of Commons.

== Members of Parliament ==
- 1585 Sir Turlogh O'Brien, Ennistymon and Boetius Clancy, Knockfinn.
- 1613–1615 Sir Daniel O'Brien, later Viscount Clare and Boetius Clancy, Knockfinn.
- 1634–1635 Sir Barnaby O’Brien (later 6th Earl of Thomond) (replaced by Sir Daniel O'Brien) and Boetius Clancy, Knockfinn
- 1639 Dermot O’Brien of Dromore and Donogh O’Brien of Dough.
- 1654 Sir Hardress Waller;Henry Ingoldsby (First Protectorate Parliament, Westminster)
- 1654 Sir Hardress Waller;Henry Ingoldsby (Second Protectorate Parliament, Westminster)
- 1659 Sir Hardress Waller;Henry Ingoldsby (Third Protectorate Parliament, Westminster)
- 1661–1666 Henry O'Brien, Lord Ibrackan and Sir Henry Ingoldsby, 1st Baronet of Beggstown Castle, County Meath.

=== 1689–1801 ===
| Election | First MP | Second MP |
|---|---|---|
| 1689 | Daniel O'Brien | John MacNamara |
| 1692 | Sir Donough O'Brien, 1st Bt | Sir Joseph Williamson |
| 1695 | Sir Donough O'Brien, 1st Bt | Sir Henry Ingoldsby, 1st Baronet |
| 1703 | Sir Donough O'Brien, 1st Bt | Lucius O'Brien |
| 1715 | Francis Gore | John Ivers |
| 1725 | George Purdon | John Ivers |
| 1727 | Francis Burton | Sir Edward O'Brien, 2nd Bt |
| 1745 | Robert Hickman | Sir Edward O'Brien, 2nd Bt |
| 1757 | Murrough O'Brien | Sir Edward O'Brien, 2nd Bt |
| 1761 | Francis Pierpoint Burton | Sir Edward O'Brien, 2nd Bt |
| 1765 | Francis Pierpoint Burton | Charles MacDonnell |
| 1768 | Francis Pierpoint Burton | Sir Lucius O'Brien, 3rd Bt |
| 1776 | Edward FitzGerald | Hugh Dillon Massy (Note: Declared not duly elected in 1776.) |
| 1778 | Edward FitzGerald | Sir Lucius O'Brien, 3rd Bt |
| 1783 | Edward FitzGerald | Sir Hugh Massy, 1st Bt |
| 1790 | Francis Nathaniel Burton | Francis McNamara |
| 1797 | Francis Nathaniel Burton | Hugh Dillon Massy |
| 1801 | Succeeded by the Westminster constituency County Clare | |

== Bibliography ==
- O'Hart, John (2007). The Irish and Anglo-Irish Landed Gentry: When Cromwell came to Ireland. Vol. II. Heritage Books. ISBN 978-0-7884-1927-0.
- Leigh Rayment's historical List of Members of the Irish House of Commons. Cites: Johnston-Liik, Edith Mary (2002). The History of the Irish Parliament 1692-1800 (6 volumes). Ulster Historical Foundation.
