= Frank Burton (footballer, born 1865) =

English footballer

Personal information
- Full name: Frank Ernest Burton
- Date of birth: 18 March 1865
- Place of birth: Nottingham, England
- Date of death: 10 February 1948 (aged 82)
- Position: Inside right

Senior career*
| Years | Team | Apps | (Gls) |
- Nottingham Forest

International career
| 1889 | England | 1 | (0) |
- * Club domestic league appearances and goals

Frank Ernest Burton (18 March 1865 – 10 February 1948) was an English international footballer, who played as an inside right.

== Career ==
Born in Nottingham, Burton played professionally for Nottingham Forest, and earned one cap for England in 1889.
