= Sir Hugh Massy, 1st Baronet =

Anglo-Irish politician

Sir Hugh Dillon Massy, 1st Baronet (c.1740 – 29 April 1807) was an Anglo-Irish politician.

Massy was the son of the Very Reverend Charles Massy, Dean of Limerick and Ardfert. He was first elected to the Irish House of Commons as the Member of Parliament for Limerick City in May 1761, but was not returned for the seat in the second vote of that year. He stood in County Clare in 1776, but was declared "not duly elected" and replaced by Sir Lucius O'Brien, 3rd Baronet. On 9 March 1782, Massy was made a baronet, of Donass in the County of Clare, in the Baronetage of Ireland. He was elected as the MP for Clare in 1783 and held the seat until 1790.

== Marriage ==
He married Elizabeth Stacpoole, daughter of George John Baptista Stacpoole and Mary Massy, on 16 August 1766. He was a first cousin of Hugh Massy, 1st Baron Massy and Eyre Massey, 1st Baron Clarina.

Parliament of Ireland
Preceded by Richard Maunsell; Charles Smyth	Member of Parliament for Limerick City; 1761; With: Edmund Pery	Succeeded by Edmund Pery; Charles Smyth
Preceded by Edward FitzGerald; Sir Lucius O'Brien, Bt.	Member of Parliament for County Clare; 1783–1790; With: Edward FitzGerald	Succeeded by Francis Nathaniel Burton; Francis McNamara
Baronetage of Ireland
New creation	Baronet (of Donass); 1782–1807	Succeeded by Hugh Dillon Massy
