= Ennis (Parliament of Ireland constituency) =

Pre-1801 Irish constituency

- Former borough constituency for the Irish House of Commons
- County: County Clare
- Borough: Ennis

1613–1801
- Seats: 2
- Replaced by: Ennis (UKHC)

Ennis was a constituency represented in the Irish House of Commons until 1800, the lower house in the Irish Parliament of the Kingdom of Ireland. In the Patriot Parliament summoned by James II in 1689, Ennis was represented with two members. Following the Acts of Union 1800, it was succeeded by the Ennis constituency in the United Kingdom House of Commons.

By 1783, the seat was in the control of the O'Brien and Burton families. Notable members include Sir Edward O'Brien, 4th Baronet. When his son, the Tory turned Irish rebel, William Smith O'Brien, became MP for the UK parliamentary seat of Ennis in 1831, The Times described the constituency as "his father's borough".

== Members of Parliament, 1613–1801 ==
- 1613 John Thornton of Doonass and Edmond Blood of Bohersallagh
- 1634–1635 Sir Barnaby O’Brien (sat for Carlow, replaced by Francis Windebank) and Sir Richard Sudwell
- 1639–1649 Simon Thorogood (replaced 1641 by Robert Casey) and Ralph Leventhorpe
- 1661–1666 William Purefoy of King's County and Isaac Granier of Kilrush

=== 1689–1801 ===
Election	First MP	Second MP
1689	Florence MacCarthy	Sir Theobald Butler
1692	Francis Burton	John Gore
1695	Francis Burton	Francis Gore
1703	Francis Burton	Simon Purdon
1713	Francis Burton	David Bindon (Note: Declared not duly elected in 1713.)
1713	Francis Burton	Francis Gore
1715	David Bindon	Samuel Bindon
1727	Arthur Gore	Samuel Bindon
1731	David Bindon	Samuel Bindon
1761	Thomas Burton	Lucius Henry O'Brien (Note: Succeeded as 3rd Baronet in 1765.)
1768	Charles McDonnell	Crofton Vandeleur
1776	William Burton (Note: Changed surname to Conyngham in 1781.)	Sir Lucius O'Brien, 3rd Bt
1778	William Burton	Francis Bernard
1783	Stewart Weldon	John Thomas Foster
1790	Sir Lucius O'Brien, 3rd Bt	William Burton Conyngham
1795	Sir Edward O'Brien, 4th Bt	William Burton Conyngham
1796	Sir Edward O'Brien, 4th Bt	Lodge Evans Morres
1798	Sir Edward O'Brien, 4th Bt	Nathaniel Sneyd (Note: Also elected for Carrick in 1798, for which he chose to sit.)
1798	Sir Edward O'Brien, 4th Bt	John Ormsby Vandeleur
1801	Succeeded by the Westminster constituency Ennis	

== Bibliography ==
- O'Hart, John (2007). The Irish and Anglo-Irish Landed Gentry: When Cromwell came to Ireland. Vol. II. Heritage Books. ISBN 978-0-7884-1927-0.
- James Frost,The History and Topography of the County of Clare
- Leigh Rayment's historical List of Members of the Irish House of Commons. Cites: Johnston-Liik, Edith Mary (2002). The History of the Irish Parliament 1692-1800 (6 volumes). Ulster Historical Foundation.
