= Samuel Bindon (Irish politician) =

Samuel Bindon was an Irish politician.

Bindon was educated at Trinity College, Dublin. He sat in the Irish House of Commons from 1715 to 1760 as a Member of Parliament (MP) for the borough of Ennis in County Clare.

He was a brother of the architect and painter Francis Bindon who along with his brother David, was also an MP for Ennis.

In 1716, he married Anne, a daughter of Thomas Coote and Anne Lovett and granddaughter of Christopher Lovett.
