= Thomas Keightley (official) =

English courtier and official in Ireland

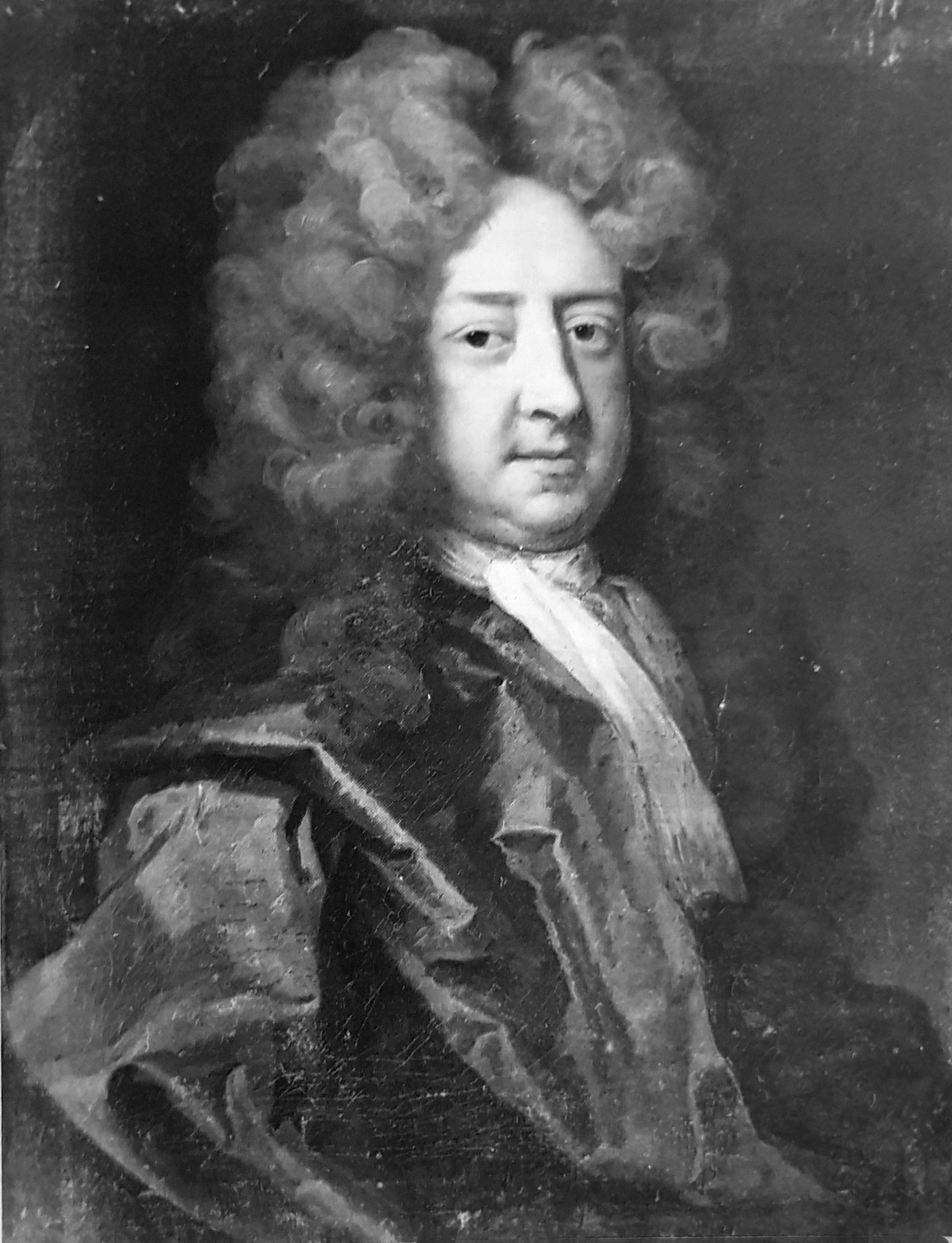

Vice-Treasurer of Ireland
- In office 1686–1689
- Preceded by: John Price
- Succeeded by: William Harbord

Personal details
- Born: 1650
- Died: 1719 (aged 68–69)
- Spouse: Frances Keightley
- Children: Catherine Keightley
- Parent: William Keightley (father)

Thomas Keightley (1650–1719) was an English courtier and official in Ireland, who as brother-in-law to Henry Hyde, 2nd Earl of Clarendon played a role in the abdication of James II.

== Life ==
Baptised at Great Amwell, he was the son of William Keightley (born 1621) of Hertingfordbury, Hertfordshire, by his wife Anne, daughter of John Williams of London, (who had married in 1648). Thomas Keightley was appointed gentleman-usher to James, Duke of York, on 2 June 1672. Keightley appears to have temporarily adopted Catholicism, the religion of his master.

Soon after his marriage in 1675 he sold his property at Hertingfordbury, and migrated to Ireland. On the appointment of his brother-in-law, Henry Hyde, 2nd Earl of Clarendon, to the lord-lieutenancy in the autumn of 1685, Keightley was admitted into intimate relations with the Irish government. He was appointed Vice-Treasurer of Ireland early in 1686, and in July following was sent to London by Clarendon, nominally to attend to his private affairs, but really to keep Clarendon's brother, Rochester, posted on Irish matters, and to maintain Clarendon's influence at court.

Keightley seems to have stayed in London throughout James II's reign, but Clarendon's efforts to induce the king to give his brother-in-law a high place in the Irish government failed. When James II fled from Whitehall at the approach of William of Orange (December 1688), Keightley was sent by Clarendon to the fugitive king at Rochester to entreat him to stay in England. James II saw Keightley on the night of 22 December, but left for France early the next morning.

After the Glorious Revolution Keightley returned to Ireland. In 1692 he was appointed a commissioner of the Irish revenue, a post which he had long sought. In 1696 he was granted Portlick Castle which had been confiscated from Garret Dillon. Many of his letters to John Ellis, dated between 1698 and 1705, are in the British Museum. He welcomed his younger brother-in-law, Lawrence Hyde, 1st Earl of Rochester, who came to Ireland as Lord Lieutenant of Ireland in 1701, and was a lord justice on the retirement of Rochester in 1702. He was commissioner for the Lord Chancellor of Ireland in 1710. Keightley died on 19 January 1719.

== Family ==
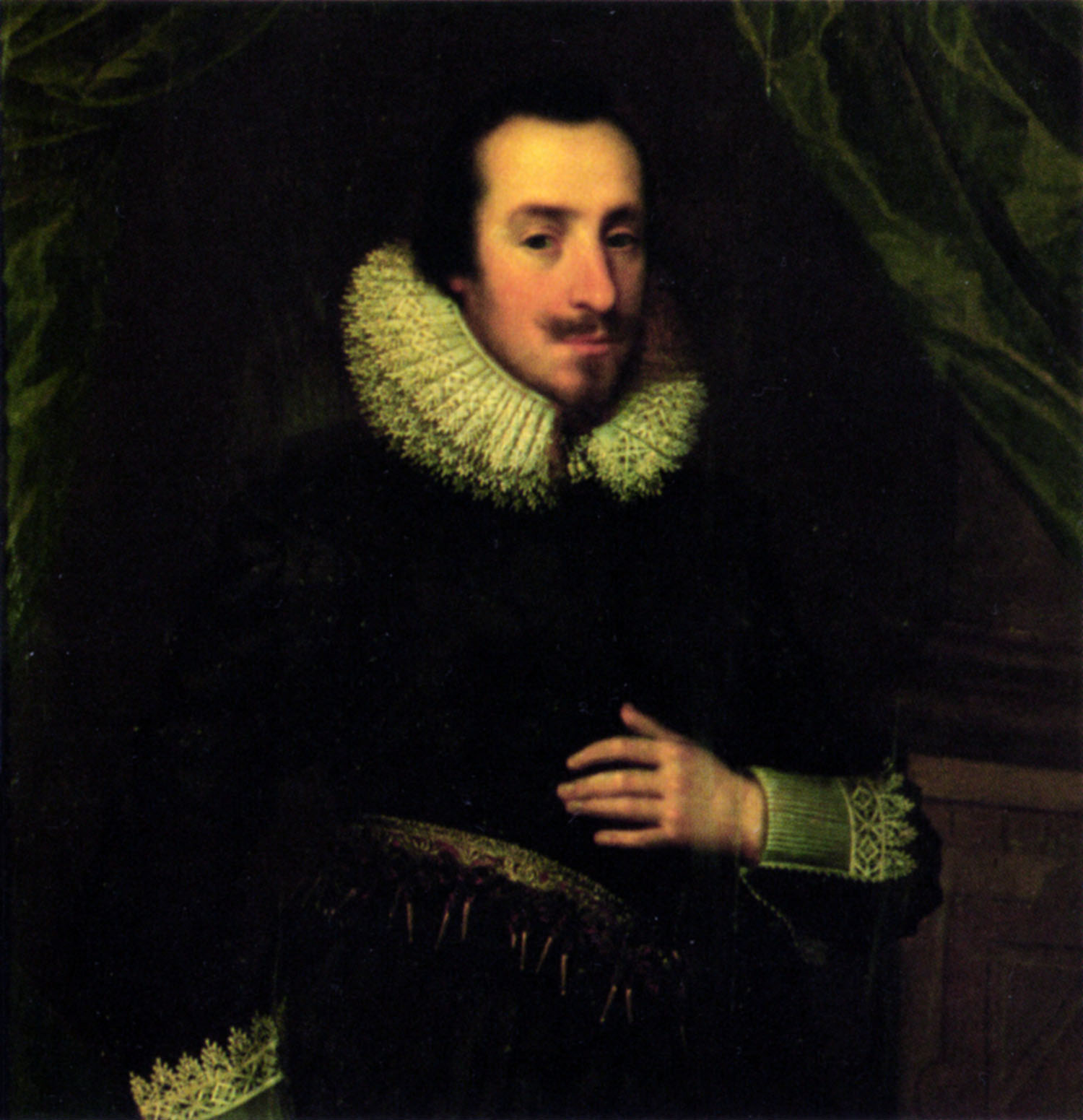
Thomas Keightley (1580-1662), grandfather of Thomas Keightley (1650–1719).

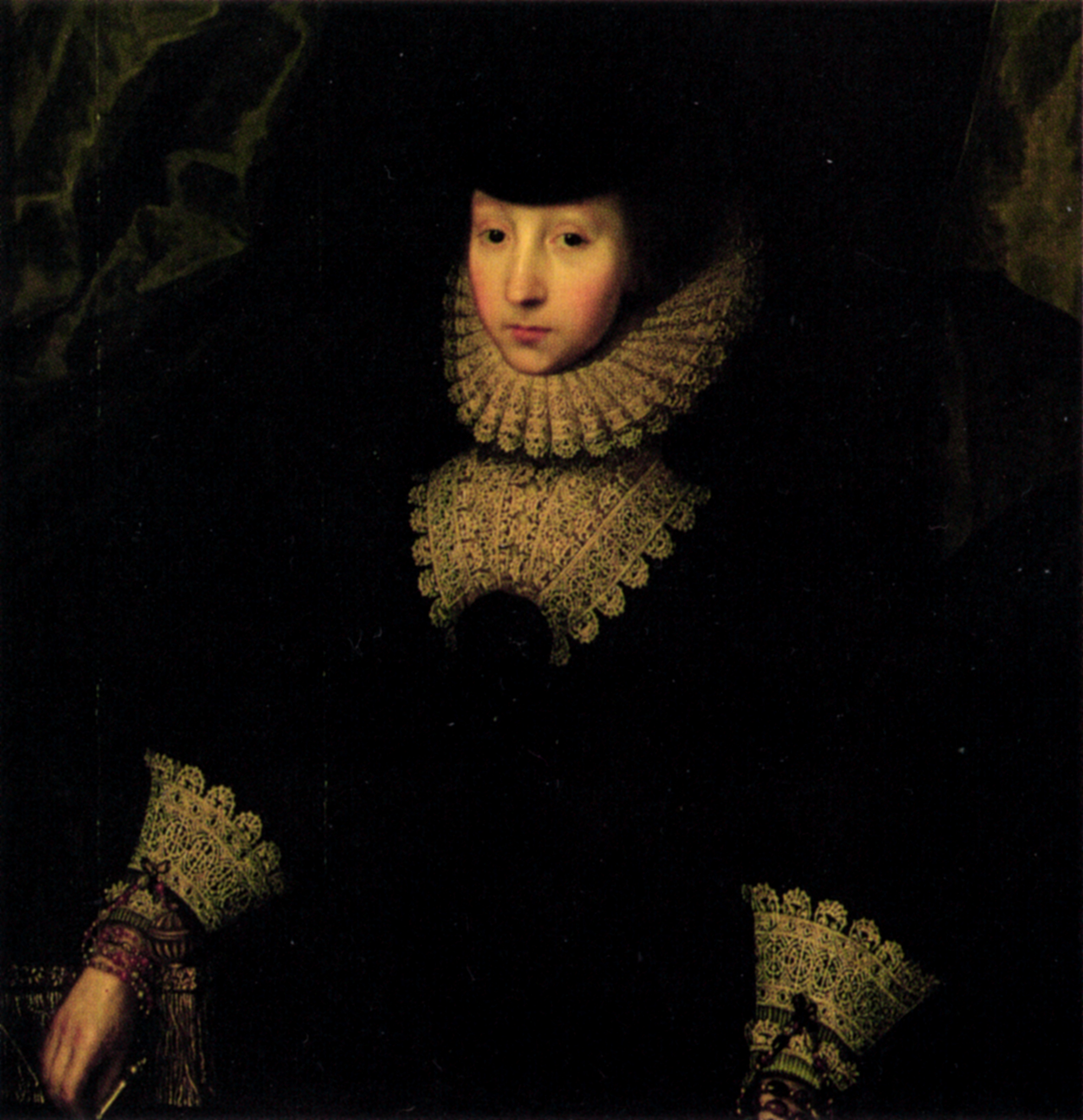
Rose Keightley, née Evelyn, (1596-1682). Wife of Thomas Keightley (1579-1662)

His paternal grandfather, Thomas Keightley, born at Kinver, Staffordshire, 28 March 1580, purchased the estate of Hertingfordbury before 1643, when John Evelyn visited him there (Diary, i. 39), and he was sheriff of Hertfordshire in 1651. He may be the Thomas Keightley, merchant, of London, who sat as M.P. for Beeralston in the parliament of 1620–1. He died in London on 22 February 1662–3, and was buried in Hertingfordbury Church. He married Rose (1596–1683), daughter of Thomas Evelyn of Ditton, Surrey. This lady was a first cousin of John Evelyn the diarist, and is described by him as possessing unusual sprightliness and comeliness when 86 years old.

On 9 July 1675 Thomas Keightley married Frances, youngest daughter of Edward Hyde, 1st Earl of Clarendon and Frances Hyde, Countess of Clarendon, and sister of the Duke of York's first wife, Anne Hyde. By late 1682 they were living in Mallow, County Cork, having had eight children, four of whom had died. The couple then separated, meeting again briefly in Dublin in July 1684, after which Frances was pregnant again, the baby being stillborn in early 1685. They next met 27 years later at Somerset House, London.

Frances was at Glaslough, Ireland, in 1686 where she met the controversialist Charles Leslie (who may have written his Short and Easie Method with the Deists, 1698, to address her religious doubts). Afterwards she was in London in 1687/8 where the last of her sons, Francis, died; she stayed for a while with her brother Henry Hyde, 2nd Earl of Clarendon who referred to her as 'this unfortunate woman'. Subsequently she lived at Athelhampton House with her sister-in-law Mary Long (nee Keightley), together with whom she petitioned King William in 1701/2 to be absolved from the fines for not attending church.

The couple's only child to survive to adulthood was Catherine, who married Lucius O'Brien in 1701.
