= Francis Nathaniel Burton =

British colonial administrator

Member of the Irish Parliament for County Clare
- In office 1790–1801

Member of the British Parliament for County Clare
- In office 1801–1808

Lieutenant-Governor of Lower Canada
- In office 29 November 1808 – 1832

Personal details
- Born: 26 December 1766 London, England
- Died: 27 January 1832 (aged 65) Bath, England
- Spouse: Valentina Alicia Lawless
- Children: 5
- Parents: Francis Conyngham, 2nd Baron Conyngham; Elizabeth Clements
- Relatives: Henry Conyngham, 1st Marquess Conyngham (twin)

Sir Francis Nathaniel Pierpoint Burton (26 December 1766 – 27 January 1832) was a British colonial administrator in Lower Canada and Irish politician.

Burton was the younger of twin sons born to Francis Conyngham, 2nd Baron Conyngham (born Burton), and his wife Elizabeth, daughter of Nathaniel Clements, in London. Henry Conyngham, 1st Marquess Conyngham, was his elder twin brother. In 1781, his father changed his surname to Conyngham upon the death of his maternal uncle, the Earl Conyngham, upon inheriting the Conyngham barony upon special remainder.

Burton sat as Member of Parliament (MP) in the Irish House of Commons for Killybegs in 1790 and 1798 and County Clare from 1790 to the Act of Union in 1801. He sat then for County Clare in the Parliament of the United Kingdom from 1801 to 1808. On 27 October 1797 he took over from his twin brother as Colonel of the Clare Militia.

Burton was appointed Lieutenant-Governor of Lower Canada on 29 November 1808, but did not travel to Lower Canada until 1822, under threat of removal of his salary. During the absence of Governor George Ramsay, Burton acted as administrator of Lower Canada from 7 June 1824 – September 1825. Although he left Quebec City in October 1825 on a permanent "leave of absence", he remained the official Lieutenant Governor until his death in 1832 in Bath, England.

He married the Hon. Valentina Alicia Lawless, daughter of Nicholas Lawless, 1st Baron Cloncurry and Margaret Browne, and had five children, including:

- Henry Stuart Burton DL JP (1808–1867)
- Capt. William Burton (born 1809) of the Scots Fusiliers

== See also ==
Sir Francis N. Burton (ship) - one of three vessels by that name

Parliament of Ireland
Preceded by William Colvill; William Burton Conyngham	Member of Parliament for Killybegs; 1790; With: John Wolfe	Succeeded by John Wolfe; Sir Henry Cavendish, 2nd Bt
Preceded by Edward FitzGerald; Sir Hugh Massy, 1st Bt	Member of Parliament for County Clare; 1790–1801; With: Francis McNamara 1790–1797; Hugh Dillon Massy 1797–1800	Succeeded by Parliament of the United Kingdom
Preceded by John Wolfe; Sir Henry Cavendish, 2nd Bt	Member of Parliament for Killybegs; 1798; With: Richard Archdall	Succeeded by Francis McNamara; Richard Archdall
Parliament of the United Kingdom
Preceded by Parliament of Ireland	Member of Parliament for County Clare; 1801–1808; With: Hugh Dillon Massy 1801–1802; Sir Edward O'Brien 1802–1808	Succeeded by Augustine FitzGerald; Sir Edward O'Brien
