= O'Brien dynasty =

Irish noble family

O'Brien Ó Briain
- Arms of O'Brien
- Parent house: Dál gCais
- Country: Kingdom of Munster, Kingdom of Thomond
- Founder: Brian Boru
- Final ruler: Murrough O'Brien, King of Thomond
- Titles: Kings of Munster; Kings of Cashel; High Kings of Ireland; Kings of Limerick; Kings of Dublin; King of Mann and the Isles; Kings of Waterford; Kings of Thomond; O'Brien claim to Desmond

The O'Brien dynasty (Classical Irish: Ua Briain; Modern Irish: Ó Briain [oː ˈbʲɾʲiənʲ]; genitive Uí Bhriain [iː ˈvʲɾʲiənʲ]) was an Irish Clan and noble house of Munster, founded in the 10th century by Brian Boru of the Dál gCais (Dalcassians). After becoming King of Munster, through conquest he established himself as Ard Rí na hÉireann (High King of Ireland). Brian's descendants thus carried the name Ó Briain, continuing to rule the Kingdom of Munster until the 12th century where their territory had shrunk to the Kingdom of Thomond which they would hold for just under five centuries.

In total, four Ó Briains ruled in Munster, and two held the High Kingship of Ireland (with opposition). After the partition of Munster into Thomond and the MacCarthy Kingdom of Desmond by Tairrdelbach Ua Conchobair in the 12th century, the dynasty would go on to provide around thirty monarchs of Thomond until 1542.

During part of this period in the late 13th century they had a rivalry with the Norman de Clare house, disputing the throne of Thomond. The last Ó Briain to reign in Thomond was Murrough Ó Briain who surrendered his sovereignty to the new Kingdom of Ireland under Henry VIII of the House of Tudor, becoming instead Earl of Thomond and maintaining a role in governance.

Throughout the time that the Ó Briains ruled in medieval Ireland, the system of tanistry was used to decide succession, rather than primogeniture used by much of feudal Europe. The system in effect was a dynastic monarchy but family-elected and aristocratic, in the sense that the royal family chose the most suitable male candidate from close paternal relations—roydammna (those of kingly material) rather than the crown automatically passing to the eldest son. This sometimes led to bitter quarrels and in-family warring. Since 1542, as a part of the Peerage of Ireland, the head of the Ó Briain house adopted primogeniture to decide succession of noble titles instead.

== Naming conventions ==
Male	Daughter	Wife (Long)	Wife (Short)
Ó Briain	Ní Bhriain	Bean Uí Bhriain	Uí Bhriain

== Background ==
The Ó Brian emerged as chiefs of the Dál gCais tribe from the south-west of Ireland and according to historian C. Thomas Cairney, the Dál gCais had come from the tribe of Erainn who were the second wave of Celts to settle in Ireland from about 500 to 100 BC. They were a cohesive set of septs, related by blood, all claiming descent in tradition from a common ancestor of Cas, sixth in descent from Cormac Cas. In the Annals of the Four Masters, the father of Cormac Cas was said to be Oilioll Olum, who was according to tradition King of Munster and King of Leinster in the 3rd century. Such a connection would have meant that the tribe held kinship with the Eoghanachta, a dynasty who had dominated Munster since the earliest times. While founder mythologies were very common in antiquity and the medieval world, such a connection is generally regarded as fanciful and politically motivated in the context of the rise to prominence of the Dalcassians.

Instead, academic histories generally accept the Dalcassians as being the Déisi Tuaisceart, after adopting a new name — first recorded under their newly adopted name under the year 934 in the Annals of Inisfallen. The Déisi, a people whose name means literally vassals, were originally located where today are south County Tipperary and counties Waterford and Limerick; the O'Rahilly's historical model counts them as ethnically Érainn.

The sept split into the Déisi Muman who continued to hold territory in Waterford and Tipperary, while the west Déisi controlled areas either side of the River Shannon. During the 8th century, the latter was further divided into the Déisi Deiscirt and the Déisi Tuaisceart who would become the Dalcassians. Prehistoric ancestors of the Déisi Tuisceart and Dál gCais may have been a once prominent Érainn people called the Mairtine.

It was during this century that the tribe annexed to Munster the area today known as Clare and made it their home. Taken from the weakened Uí Fiachrach Aidhne it had previously been part of Connacht but was renamed Thomond (Tuamhain, meaning North Munster). After gaining influence over other tribes in the area such as the Corcu Mruad and Corcu Baiscinn, the Dalcassians were able to crown Cennétig mac Lorcáin as King of Thomond, he died in 951. His son Mathgamain mac Cennétig was to expand their territory further according to the Annals of Ulster; capturing the Rock of Cashel capital of the Eoghanachta, the Dalcassians became Kings of Cashel and Munster over their previous overlords for the first time in history.

Mathgamain along with his younger brother Brian Boru began military campaigns such as the Battle of Sulcoit, against the Norse Vikings of the settlement Limerick, ruled by Ivar. The Dalcassians were successful, plundering spoils of jewels, gold and silver, saddles, finding "soft, youthful, bright girls, booming silk-clad women and active well-formed boys". The males fit for war were executed at Saingel, while the rest were taken as slaves.

Through much of his reign Mathgamain was competing with his Eoghanachta rival Máel Muad mac Brain. Mathgamain was only defeated in the end by a piece of treachery; he believed he was attending a friendly meeting, but was betrayed at Donnubán mac Cathail's house, handed over to his enemies and executed in 976. The crown of Munster was briefly back in the hands of the Eoghanachta for two years until Brian Boru had thoroughly avenged his brother, with the defeat and slaying of Máel Muad in the Battle of Belach Lechta.

== Rise of Brian Boru ==
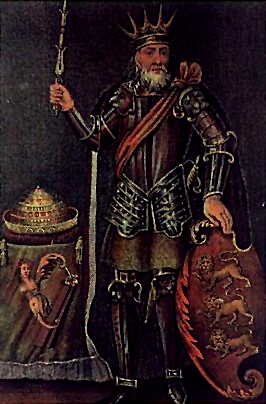
Brian Boru, High King.

The following year Brian came to blows with the Norsemen of Limerick at Scattery Island where a monastery was located. Whilst all parties were Christians, when their king Ivar and his sons took refuge in the monastery, Brian desecrated it and killed them in the sanctuary; the Vikings of Limerick had earlier killed Brian's mother.

Following this the Dalcassians came into conflict with those responsible for the death of Mathgamain, the Eoghanachta represented by Donovan and Molloy. A message was sent to Molloy, where Boru's son Murrough would challenge him in single combat; eventually the Battle of Belach Lechta took place where Molloy along with 1200 of his soldiers were slain. Donovan was destroyed together with Aralt, his brother-in-law and Ivar's remaining son, newly elected king of the Danes and Foreigners of Munster, in Donovan's fortress of Cathair Cuan, which Brian razed. With this Brian Boru was now the King of Munster.

Brian's rise did not go unnoticed, however; Máel Sechnaill II from the Clann Cholmáin sept of the Uí Néill, as reigning king of Mide and High King of Ireland marched an army down to Munster to send a warning to the Dalcassians. His army cut down the tree of Magh Adhair, which was sacred to the Dalcassians as it was used as their site of royal inaugurations. This sparked a conflict between Máel Sechnaill and Brian, the object of both men to be recognised as High King.

A treaty would eventually be reached between Máel Sechnaill and Brian which split the areas of influence in Ireland between them. Brian gained control over a large portion of the island's south including Dublin. The peace didn't last long as Brian used the newly acquired forces of Dublin and Leinster to spearhead an attack against Máel Sechnaill which ended in their defeat and forced Brian to reconsider pressing any further North.

The war dragged on but Brian would eventually force Máel Sechnaill to accept his authority when northern branch of the Uí Néill clan refused to support him. Despite his fall in position Máel Sechnaill would become one of Brian's most important allies. Eventually the northern Uí Néill branch would accept Brian's rule as well, unusually for the time this was done peacefully, their submission to Brian was negotiated by the clergy rather than forced in battle.

With the most powerful Kings in Ireland now accepting Brian as the High King it was a much easier task for Brian to force the remaining Kings to submit to his rule and though it may have been tenuous he eventually was acknowledged as High King by all the rulers in Ireland.

== O'Brien dynasty ==
Brian's descendants, the Ua Briain provided a further three High Kings of Ireland and exercised supremacy in Munster until Tairrdelbach Ua Conchobair, taking advantage of war between brothers Diarmait and former High-King Muircheartach, invaded Munster and split it in two in the Treaty of Glanmire (1118) granting Thomond to the sons of Diarmait Ua Briain and Desmond to the leading sept of the dispossessed Eoganacht, the Mac Cárthaigh dynasty. After the death of Domnall Mór Ua Briain, a claimant to the Kingship of Munster, they further retreated beyond the Shannon into the area of modern County Clare in the wake of the Norman Invasion. In 1276 King Edward II granted all of Thomond to Thomas de Clare, taking advantage of the feuding between Clann Taidhg and Clann Briain (whom de Clare supported). The de Clares failed in conquering Thomond, and were decisively defeated in the Battle of Dysert O'Dea in 1318, thus the Kingdom of Thomond remained outside of foreign control for a further 200 years.

In 1543 Murchadh Carrach Ó Briain agreed to surrender his Gaelic Royalty to King Henry VIII and accepted the titles Earl of Thomond and Baron Inchiquin. At his death in 1551 the Earldom passed to his nephew Donough by special remainder, and the title Baron Inchiquin passed to his male heirs through his son Dermot. The Earldom went extinct at the death of Henry O'Brien, 8th Earl of Thomond; the next heir would have been a descendant of Daniel O'Brien, 3rd Viscount Clare who had been attainded in 1691, so the title became forfeit. However, Charles O'Brien, 6th Viscount Clare, a Jacobite exile used the title Earl of Thomond, as did his son, who died childless in 1774. At the death of James O'Brien, 3rd Marquess of Thomond, the title Baron Inchiquin passed to a distant cousin and descendant of Murrough, Sir Lucius O'Brien, 5th Baronet, and was passed down to his descendants.

== Coat of arms ==
The earliest known banner associated with the O’Briens comes from the Dalcassians, the tribal group from which the dynasty descends. This banner is described in the Book of Leinster as featuring the colours "red, purple, gold (yellow), and dung (brown)", though the exact design is not recorded. The Dalcassians held the honour of leading the King of Munster’s army into battle, and their symbolic use of colour predates the formal introduction of Anglo-Norman heraldry to Ireland.

Brian Boru, the most famous O’Brien and High King of Ireland, is said to have had two different banners attributed to him. One tradition describes a blue banner displaying an arm holding a sword with a sun. The other features the more recognisable English symbol of three lions. It is argued that the former, with the arm and sword, is more accurate in continuity with the native Irish symbolic system and was used to link Brian’s line with an earlier Munster royal dynasty, the Eóganachta, who used the same symbol. These kings took the throne-name "Magha Nuadhad" ("slave of Nuadu"), referencing the mythological god Nuada Airgetlám of the Tuatha Dé Danann. Nuadu, who lost his arm in battle and was given a magical silver replacement, was disqualified from kingship until his restoration. The emblem of a forearm holding a sword recalls this myth and became a motif of legitimacy and right to rule.

When the Ui Briain (O’Brien) dynasty supplanted the Eóganachta as kings of Munster, they also took up this ancient symbol. The Chief Herald of Ireland later stated that the first heraldic arms used by the O’Briens were "gules a dexter forearm holding a sword in pale all proper"; a red background with a right arm holding an upright sword.

However, the arms of the O’Brien dynasty changed dramatically in 1543 when Murrough Ua Briain, the last King of Thomond, surrendered his kingdom to Henry VIII. In exchange, Murrough was created the 1st Earl of Thomond and granted English arms: "gules three lions passant guardant in pale per pale or and argent." This marked a symbolic break from Gaelic sovereignty and an official embrace of English heraldic norms. Although the old arms were formally replaced, the ancient image of the sword-bearing arm survived as a crest, now emerging from clouds to reference the Gaelic motto "Lamh Laidir an Uachtar" ("the strong hand uppermost"). This visual pun maintained a link to the dynasty’s Gaelic past while expressing submission to the Tudor order.

In the post-surrender period, the arms were further developed. The quartered arms included new symbols, one being three piles meeting in base; possibly referencing the O’Briens of Arra or adopted from the Anglo-Norman knight Sir Guy Bryan, 1st Baron Bryan due to a similarity in name. Later, the symbol of a pheon (arrowhead) was added to represent loyalty to Sir Henry Sidney, the English Lord Deputy of Ireland. Despite these changes, the core image of the arm and sword persisted as the central crest, preserving the link to both Gaelic kingship and the divine right to rule.

== Family tree ==
Key:

- = King of Dál gCais
- = King of Thomond
- = Baron Inchiquin
- =Viscount Clare
- =Earl of Thomond, Earl of Inchiquin
- =Marquess of Thomond

O'Brien Dynasty

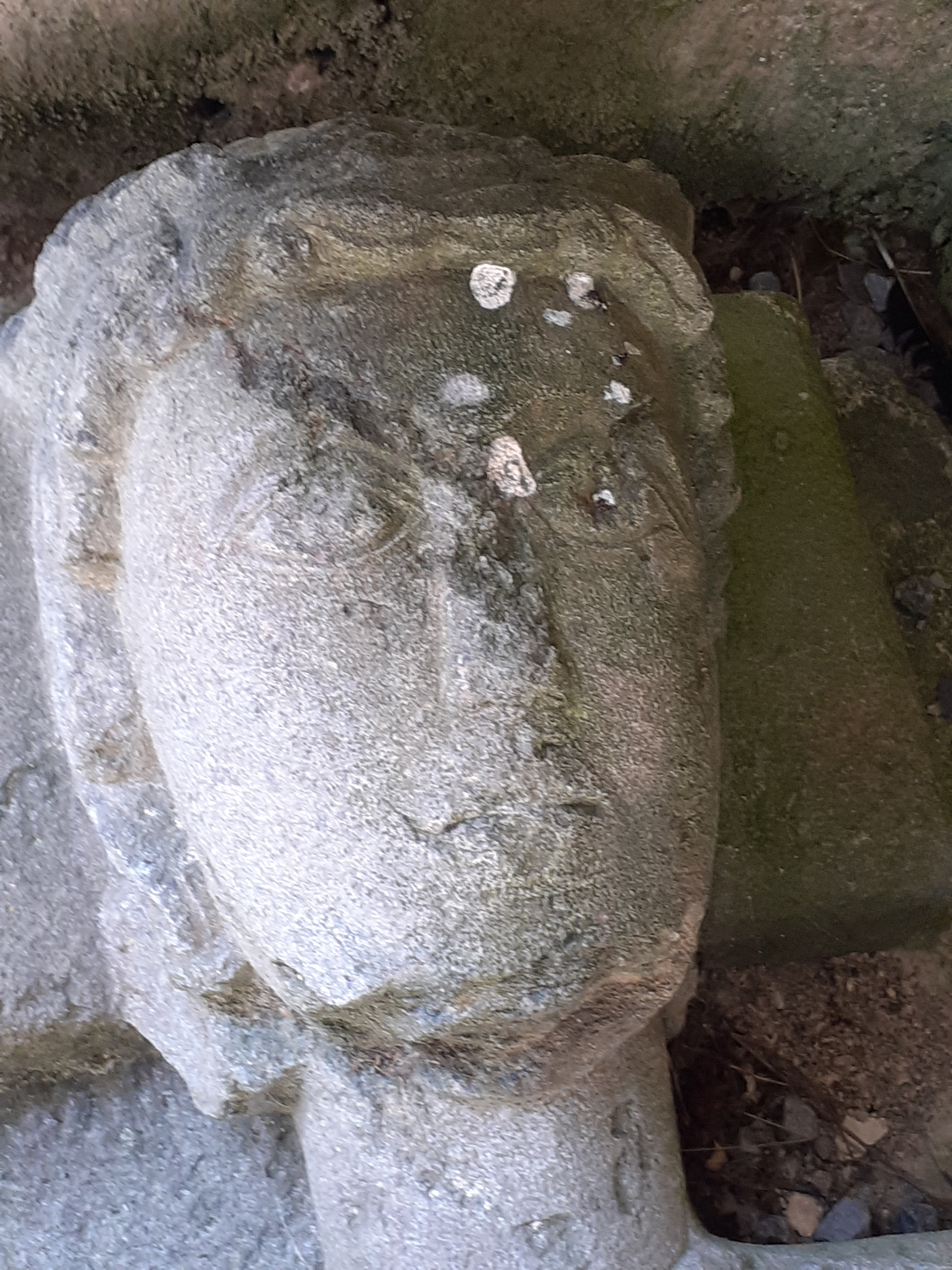
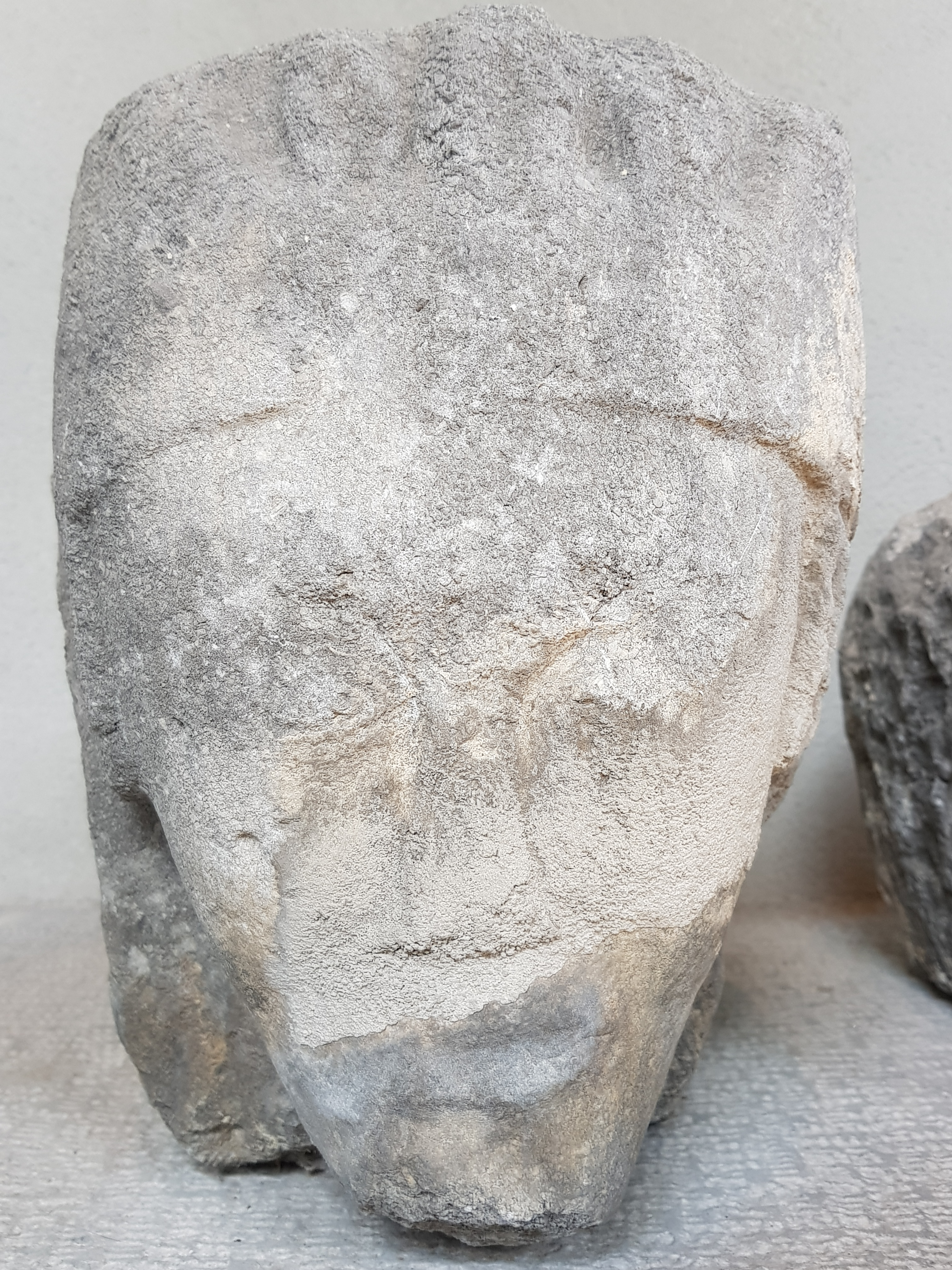
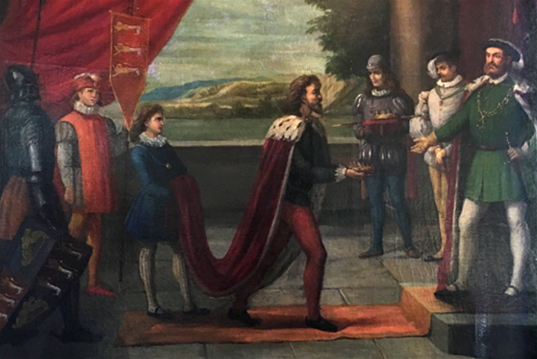
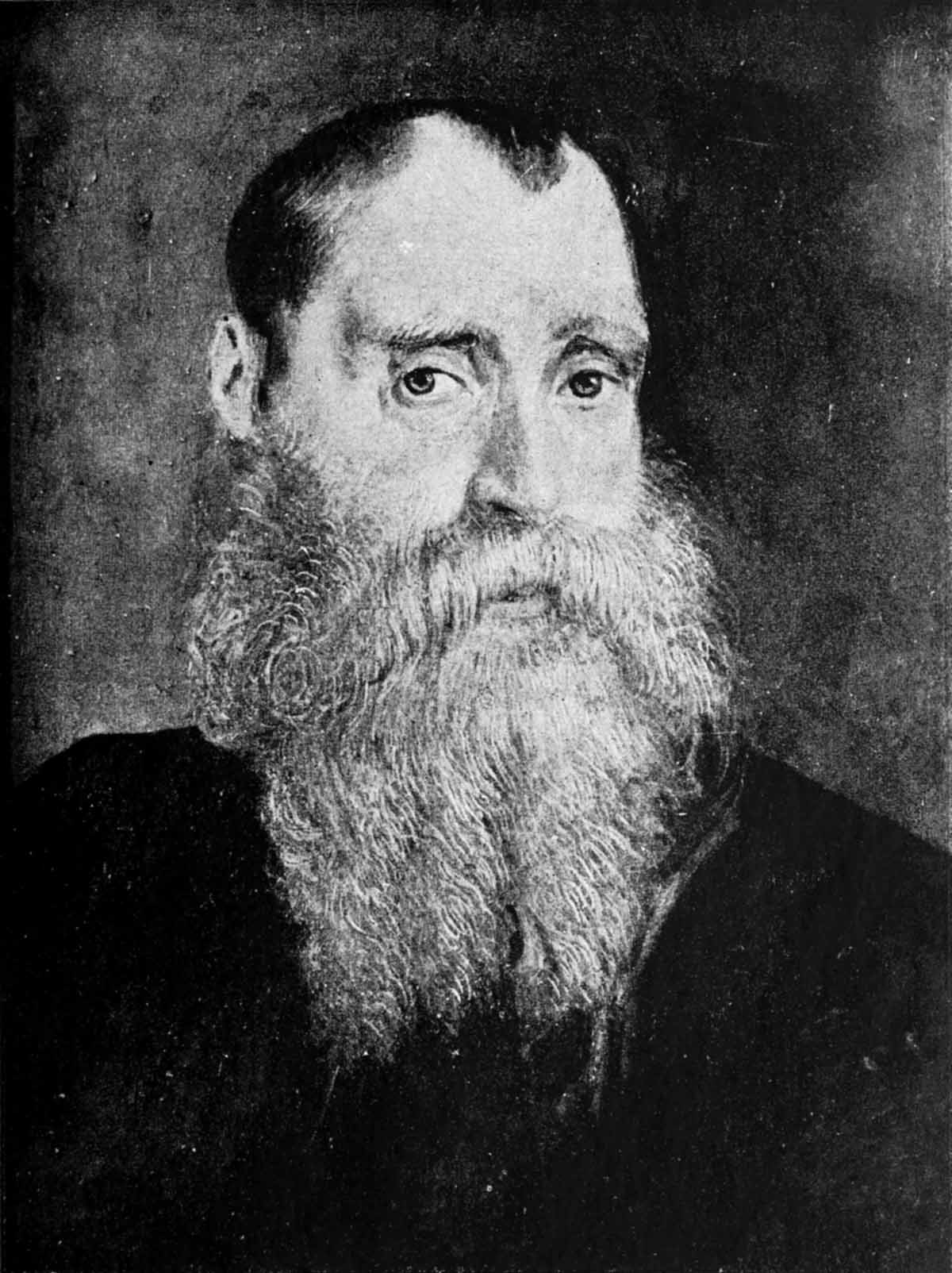
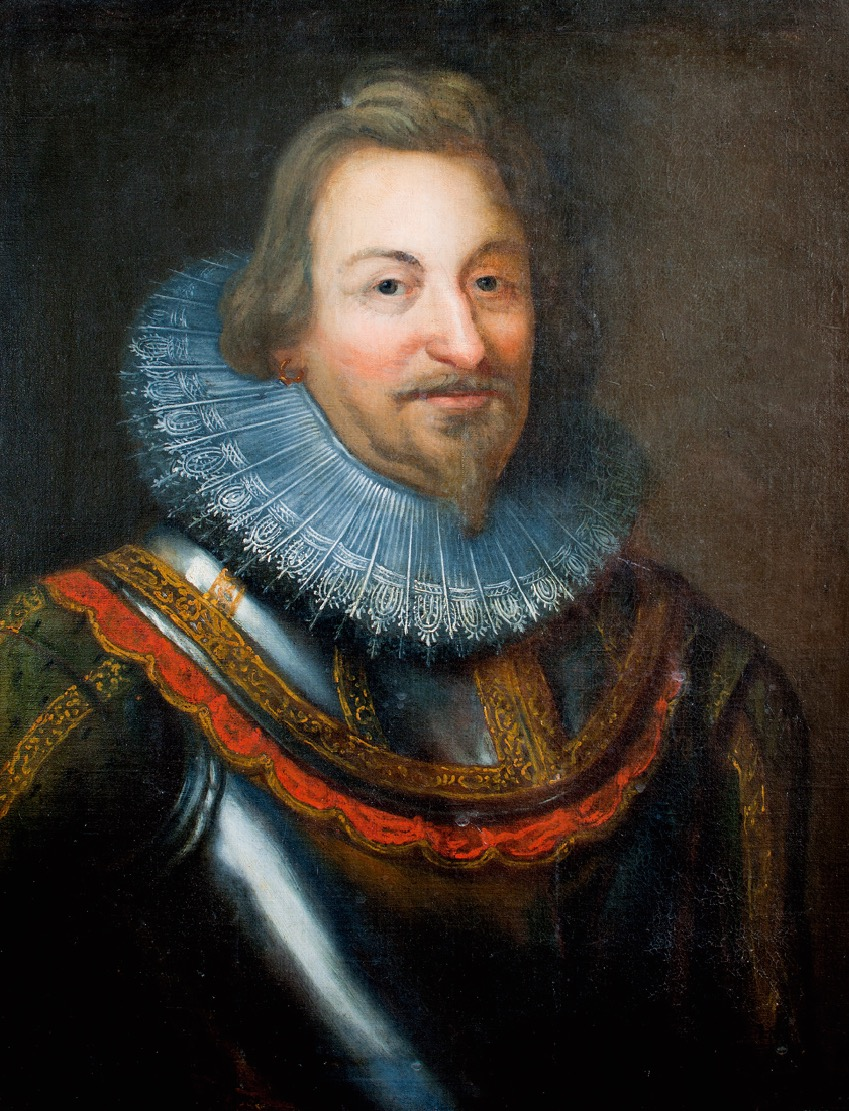
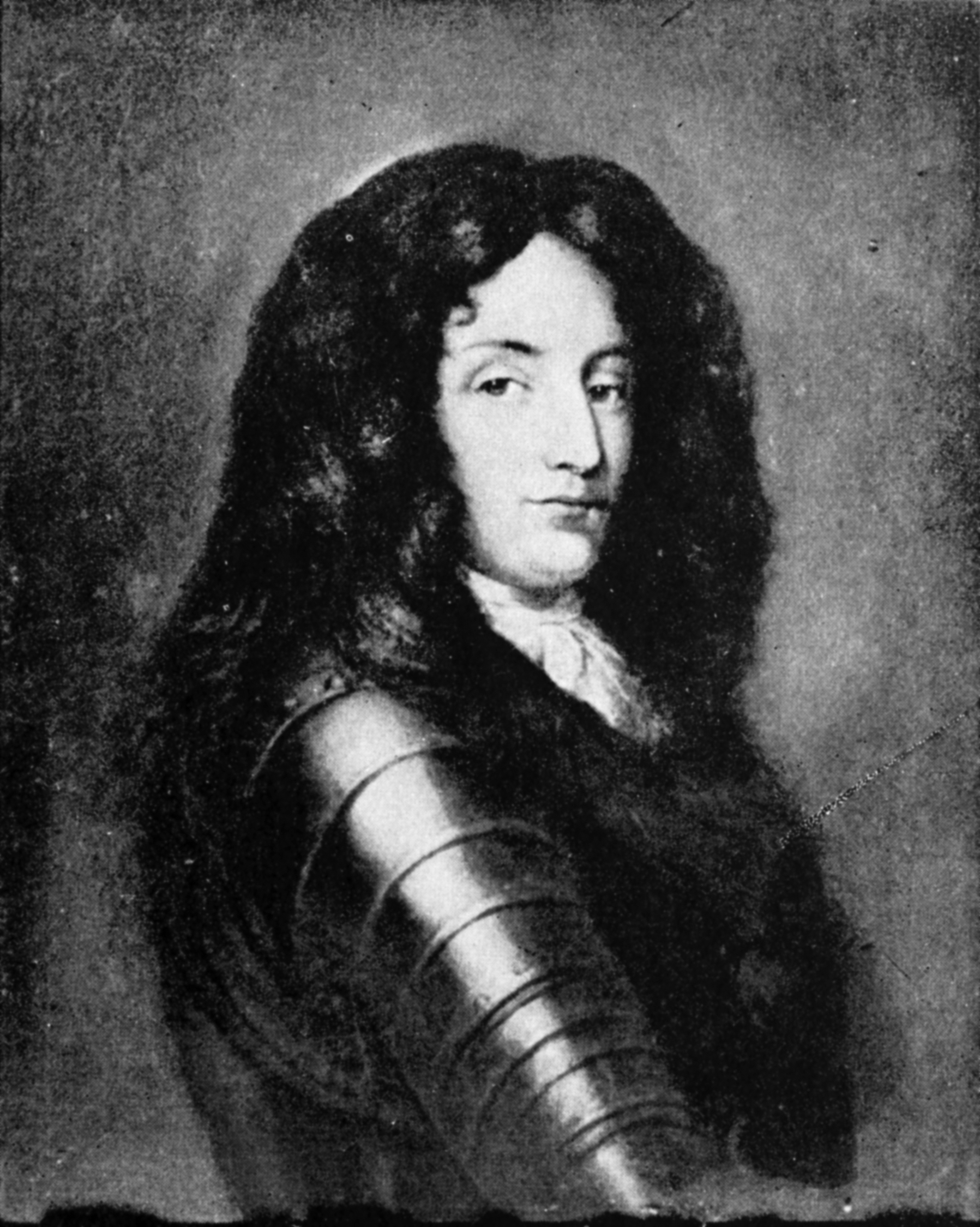
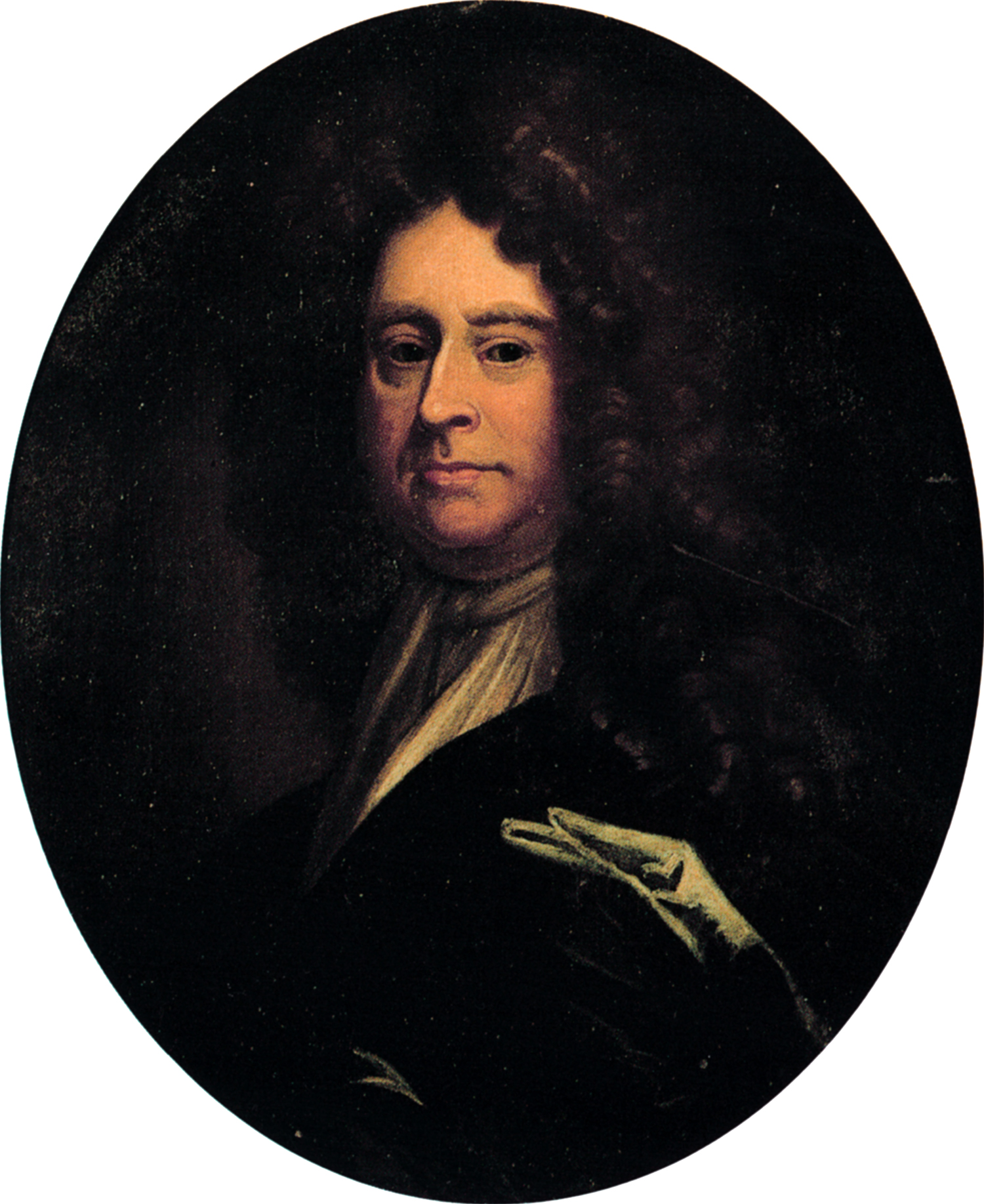
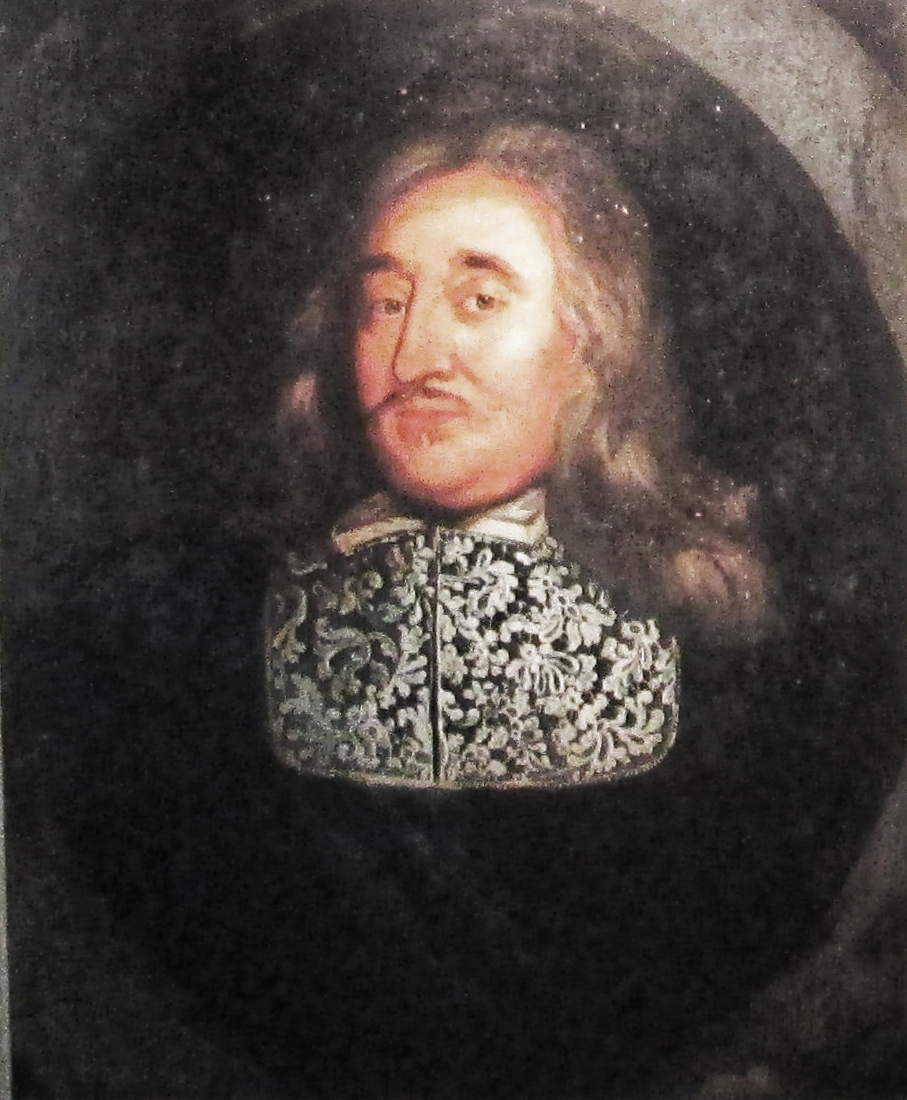
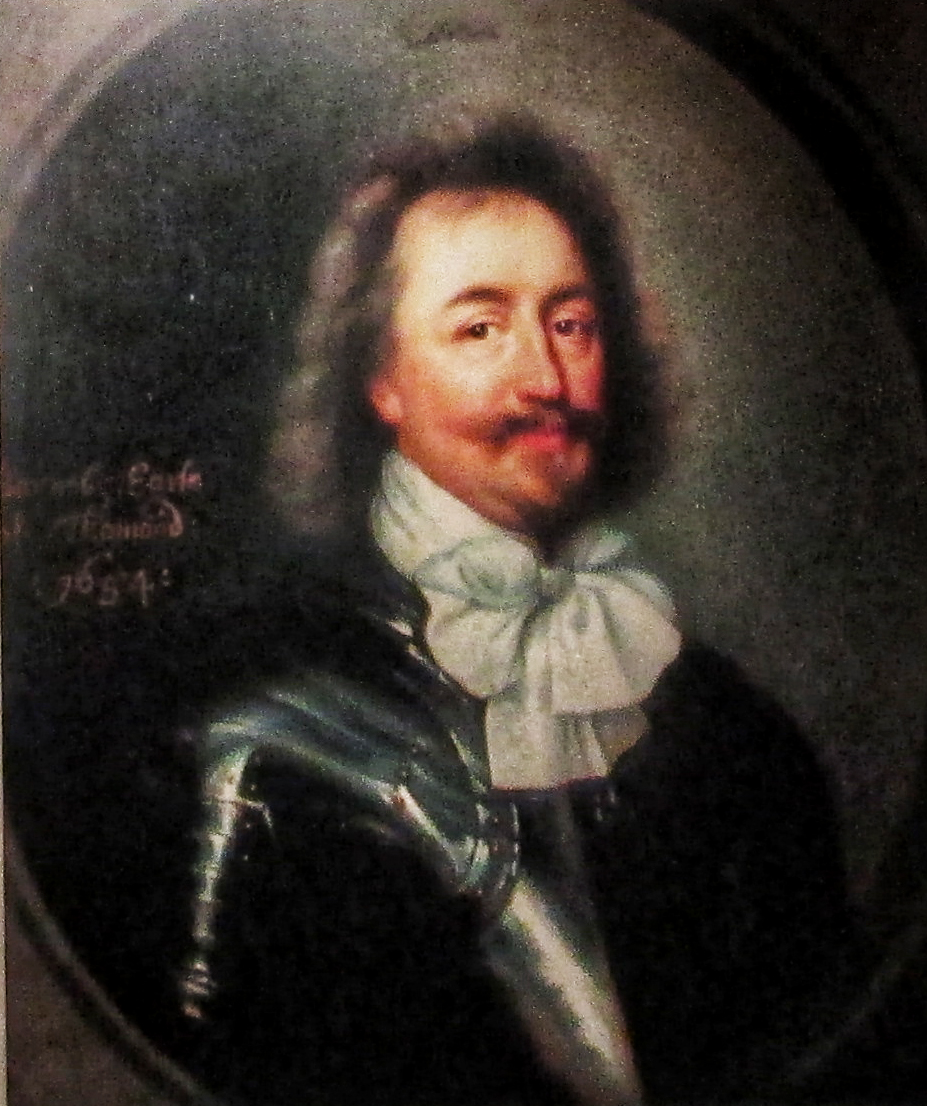
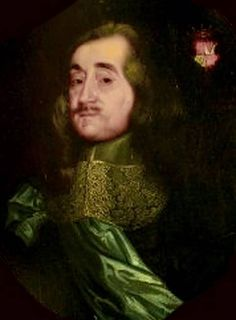
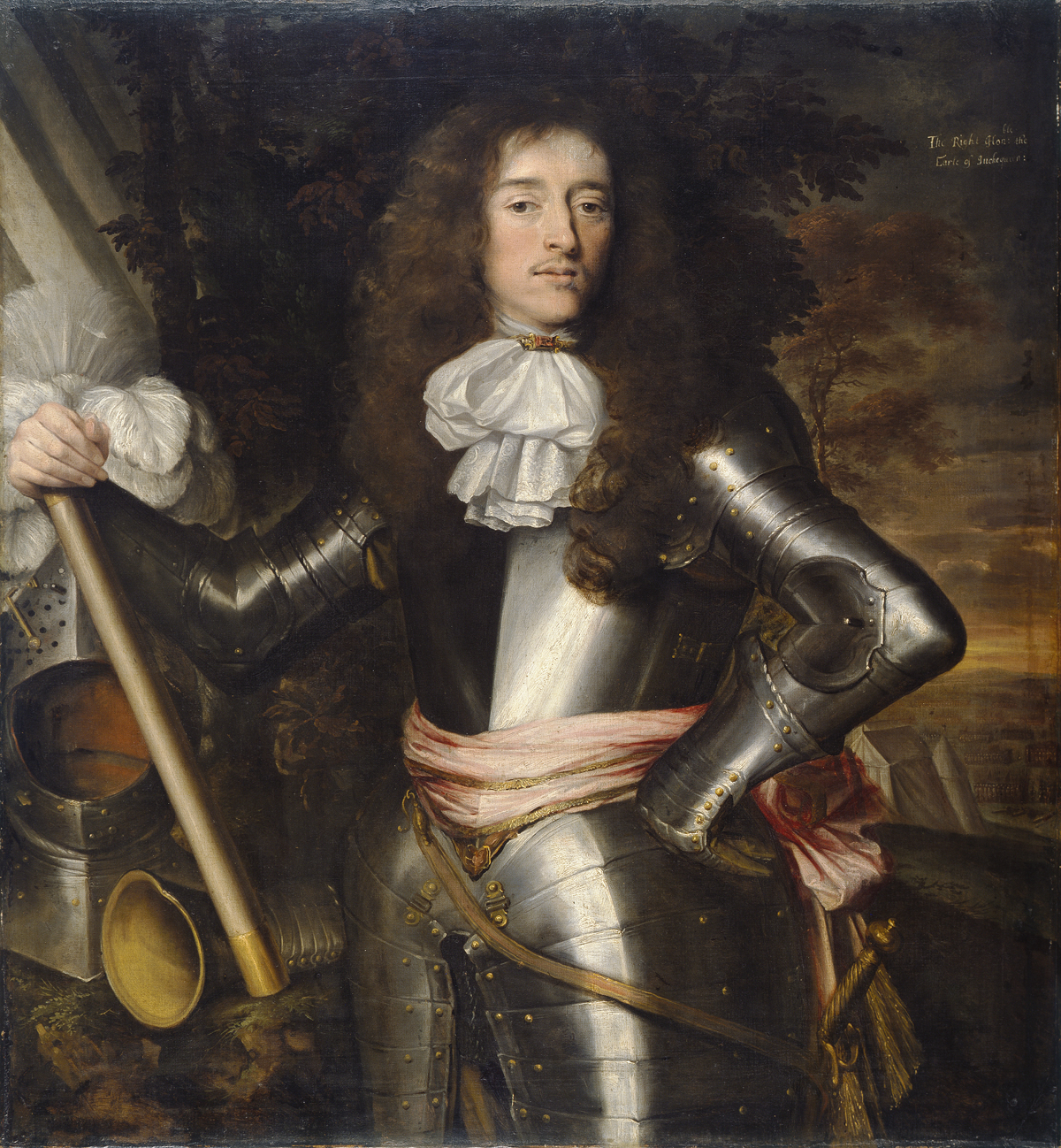
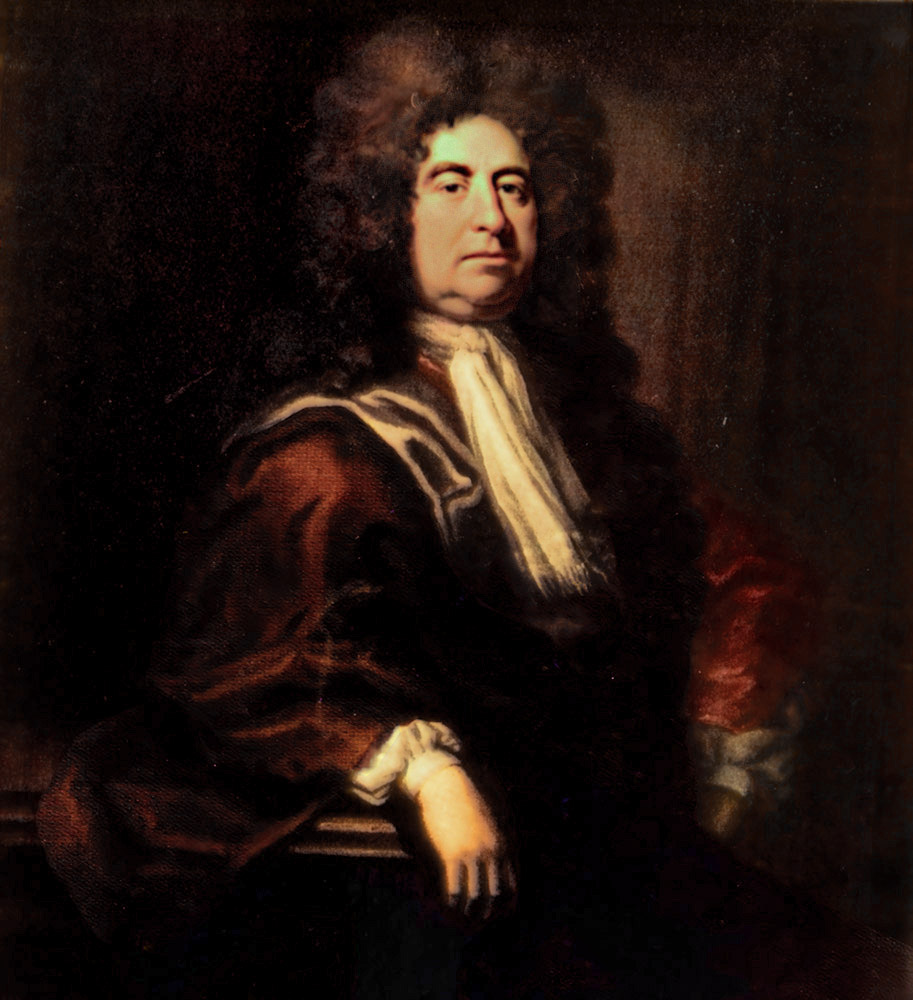
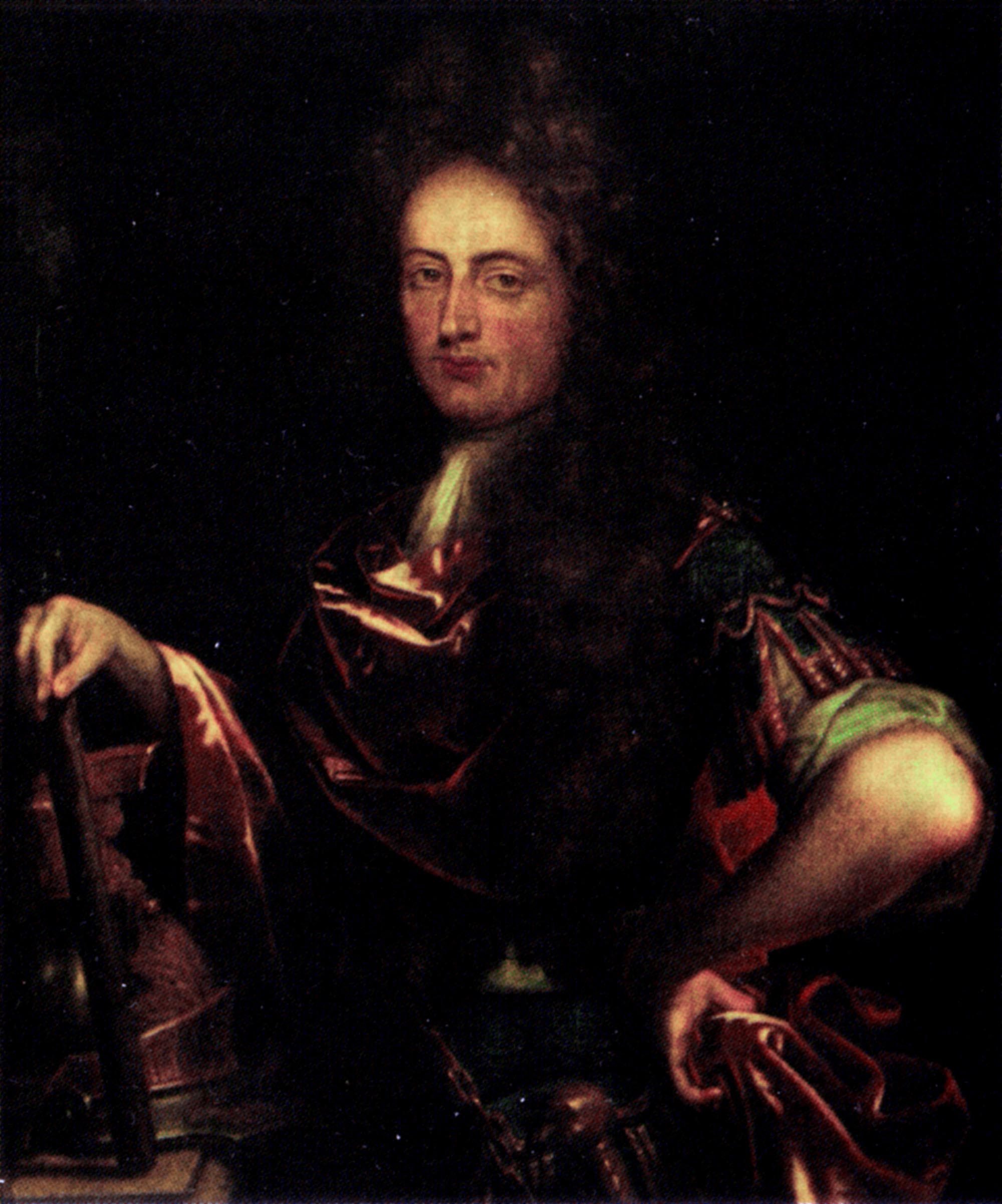
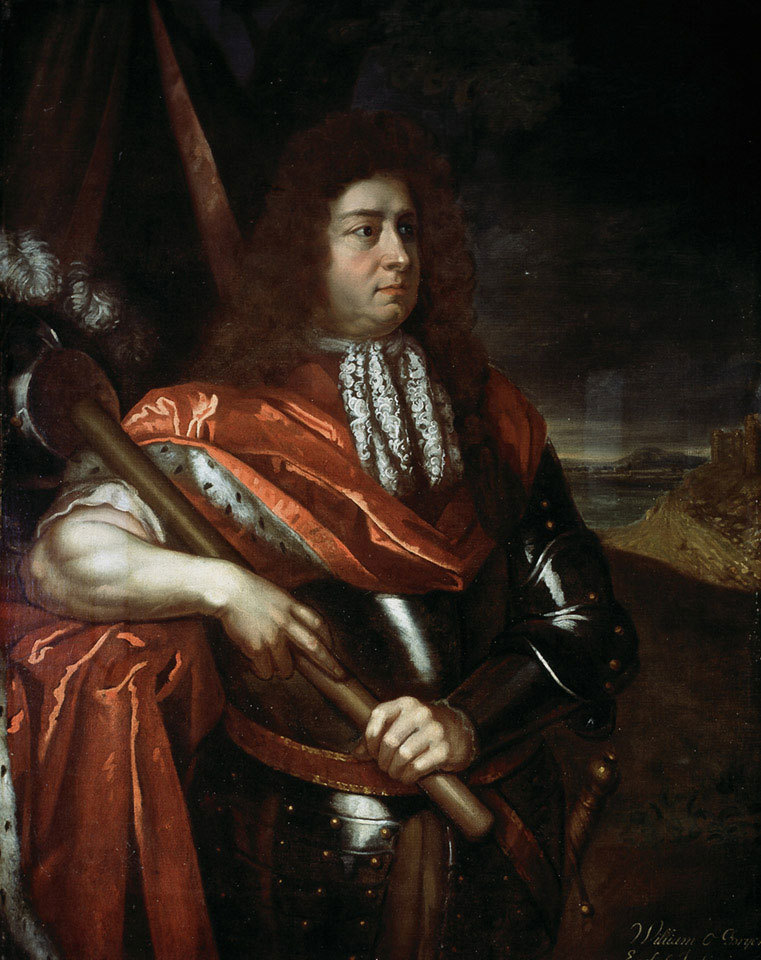
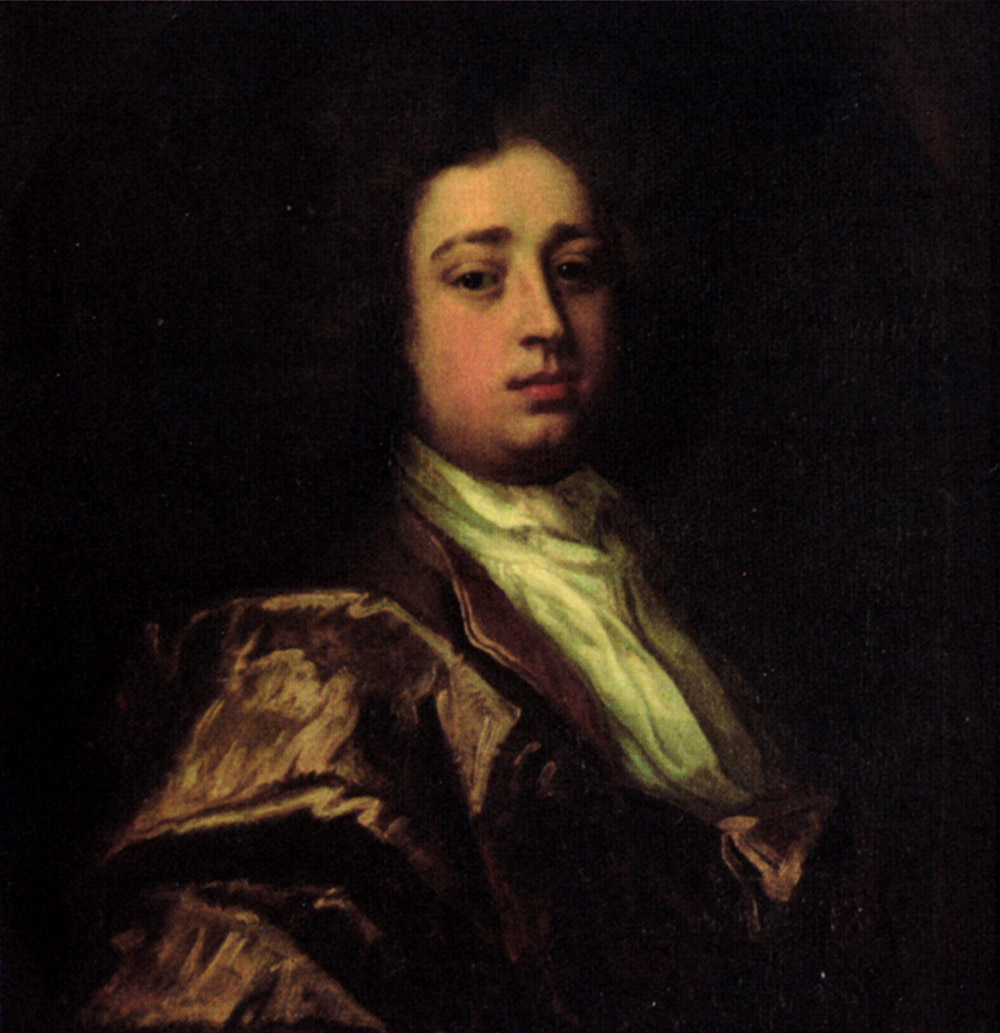
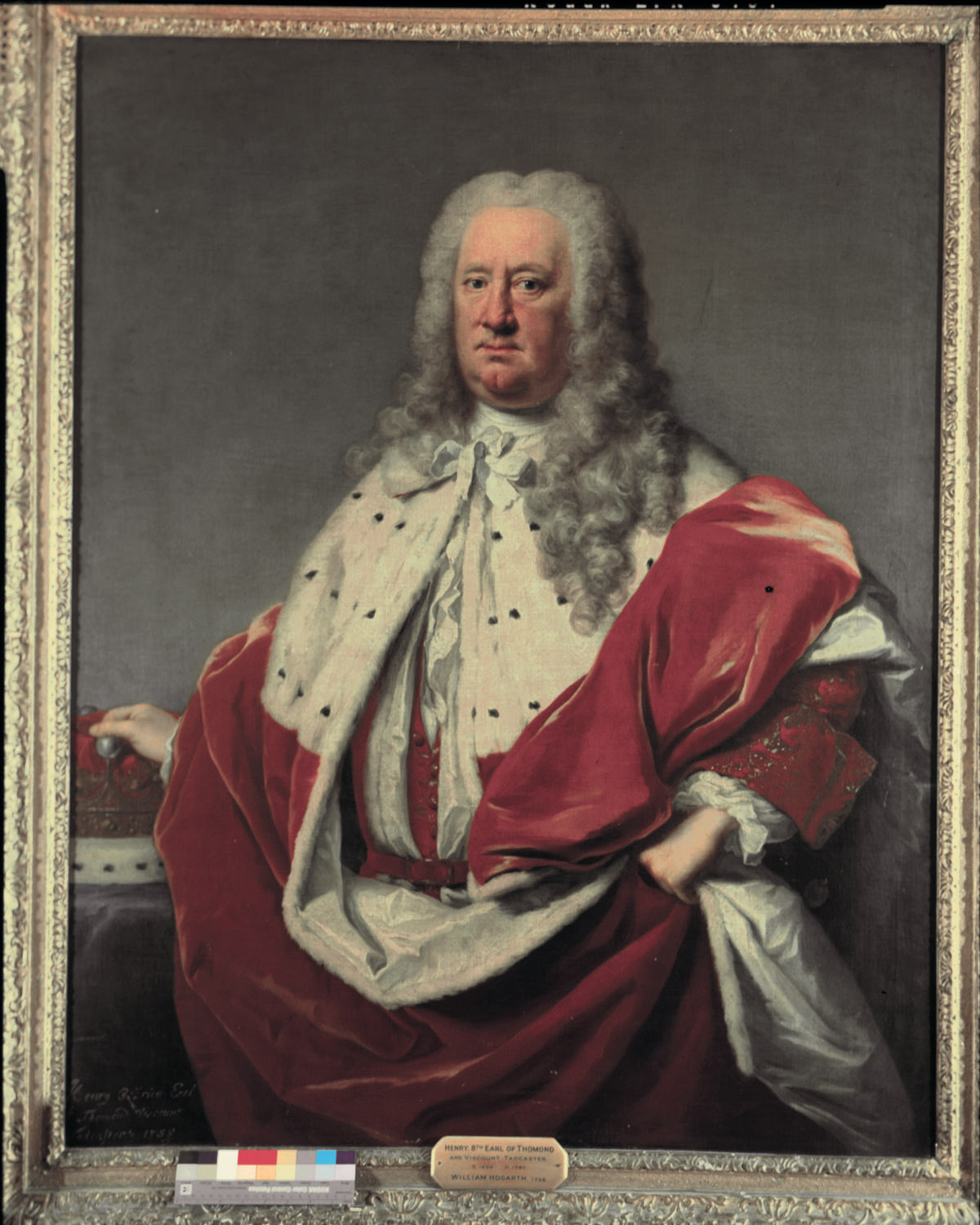
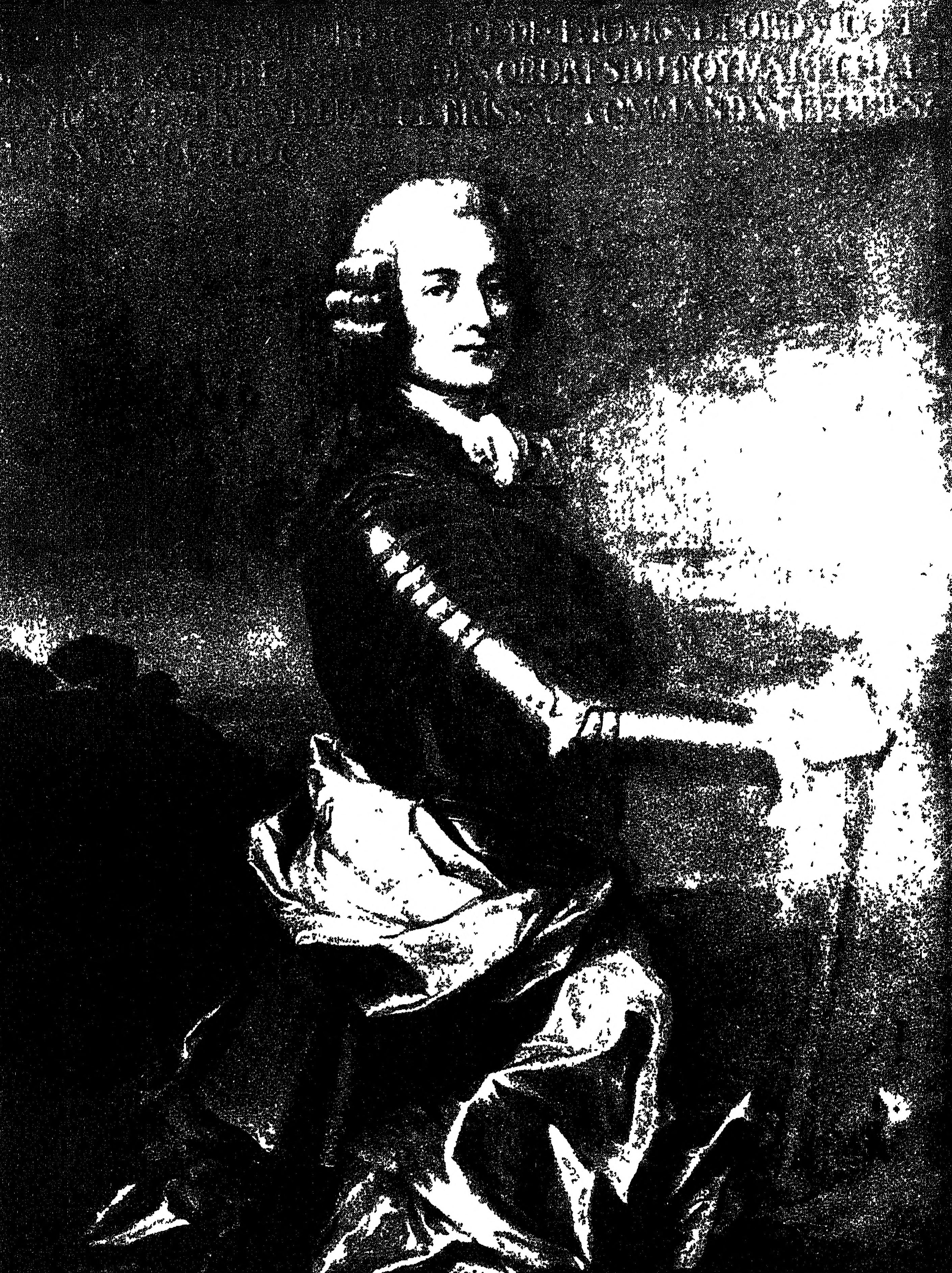
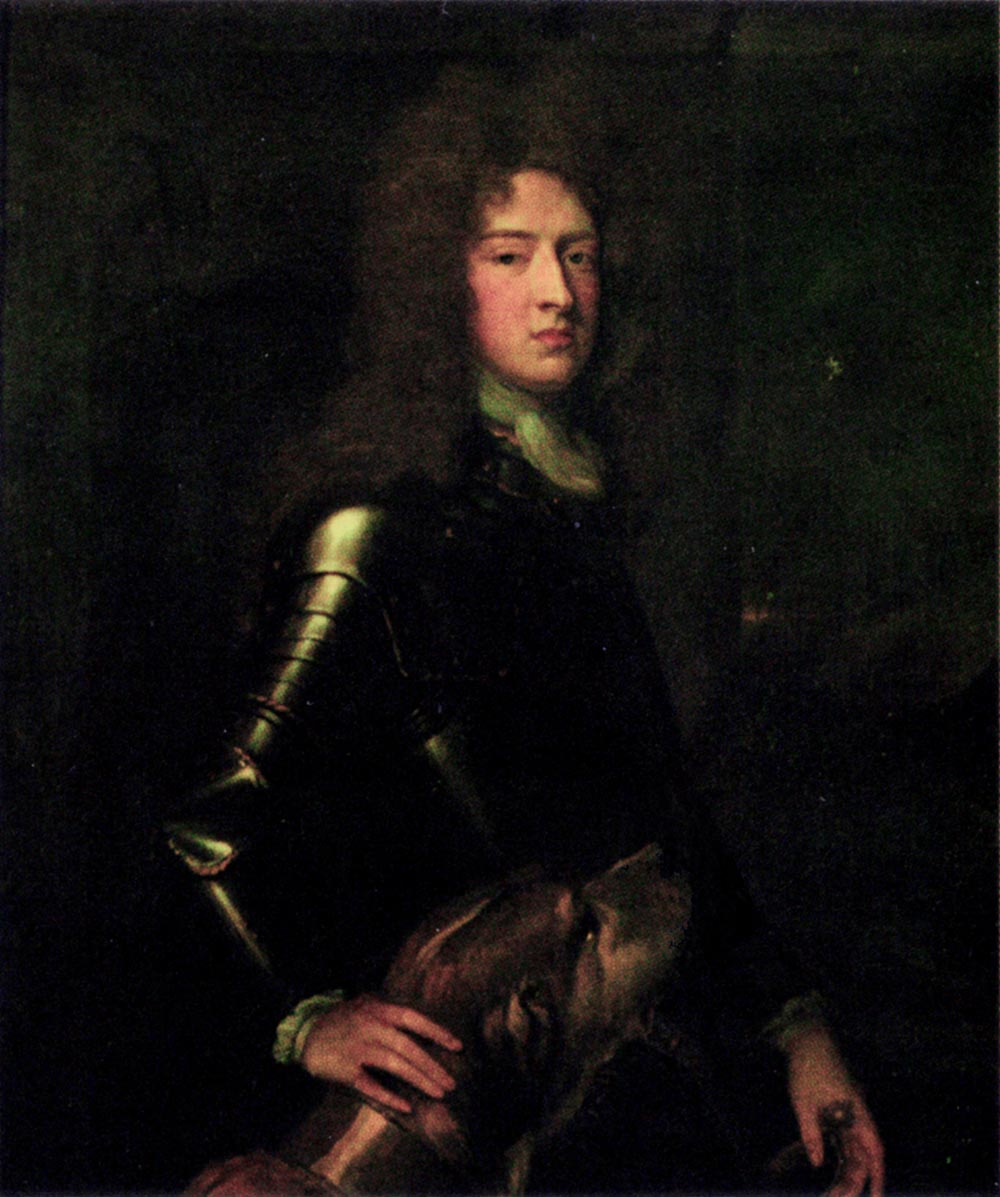
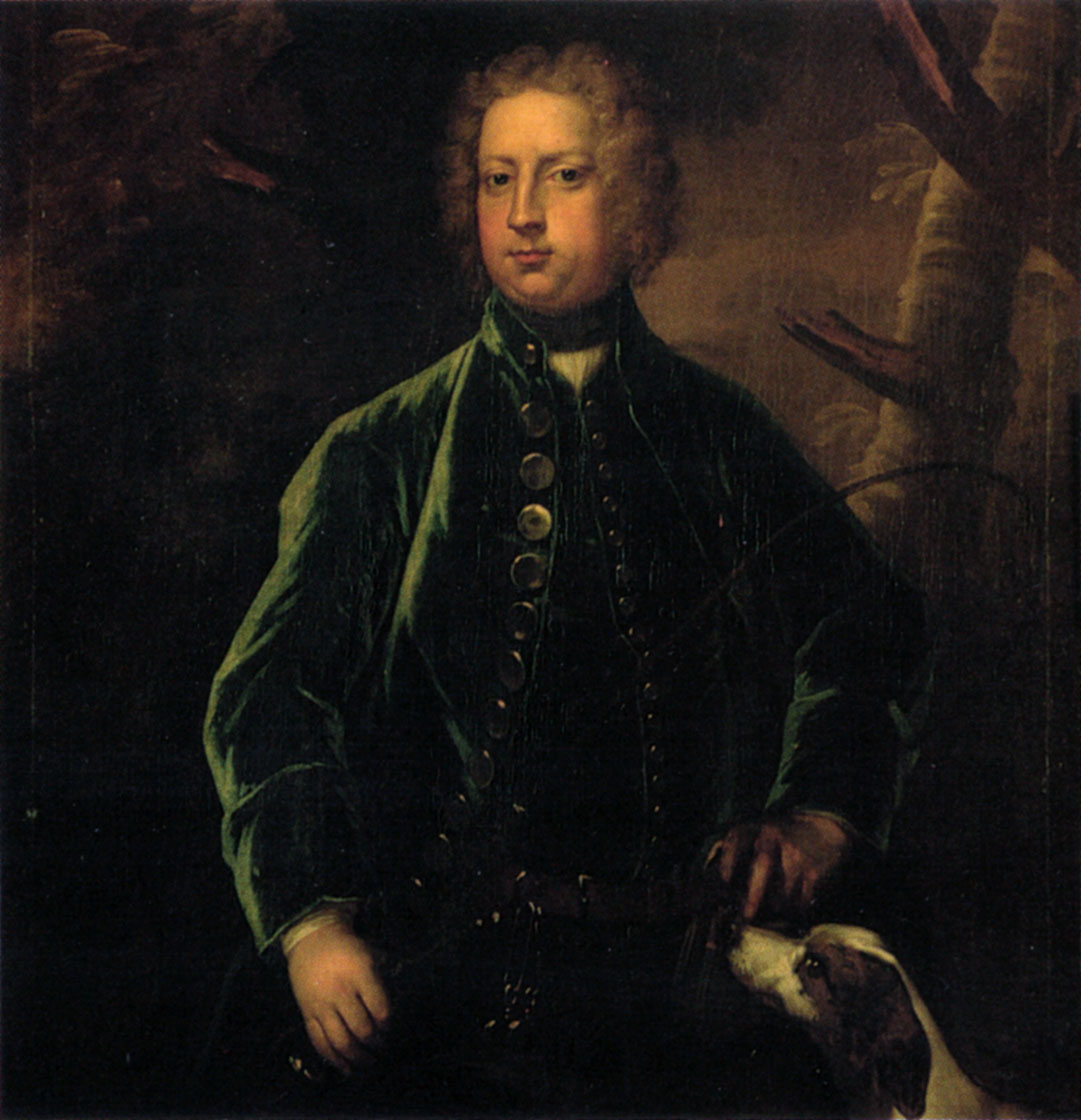
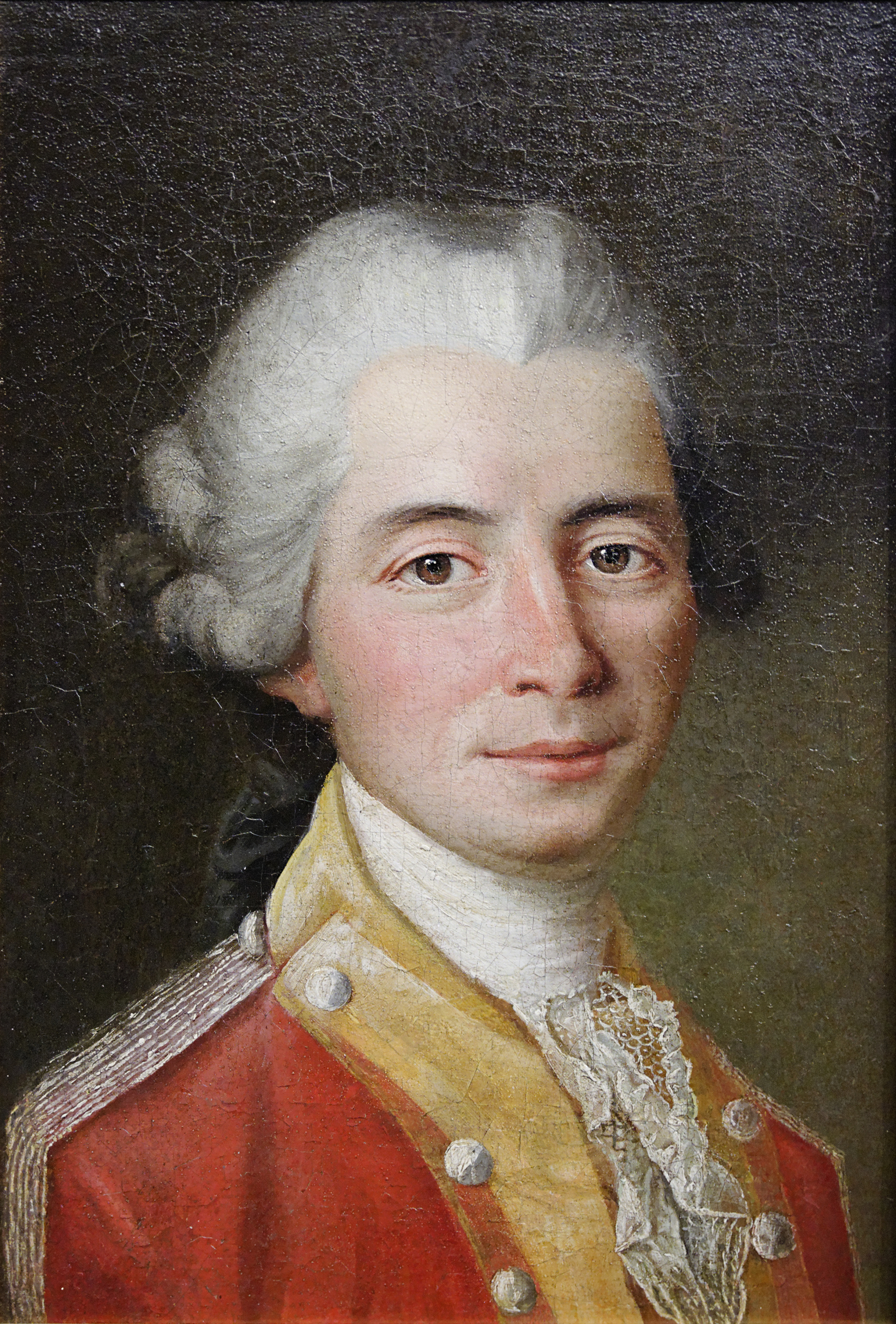
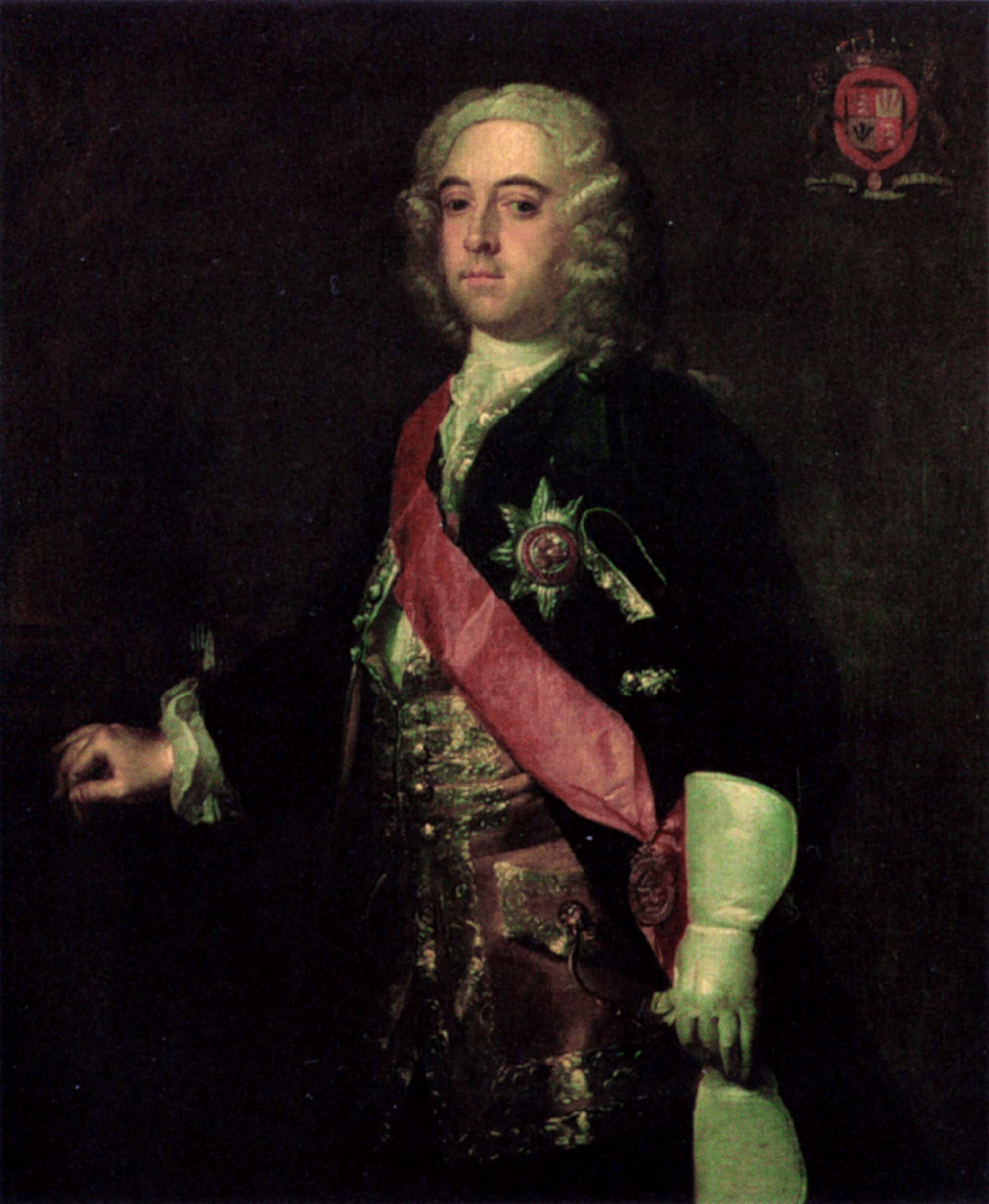
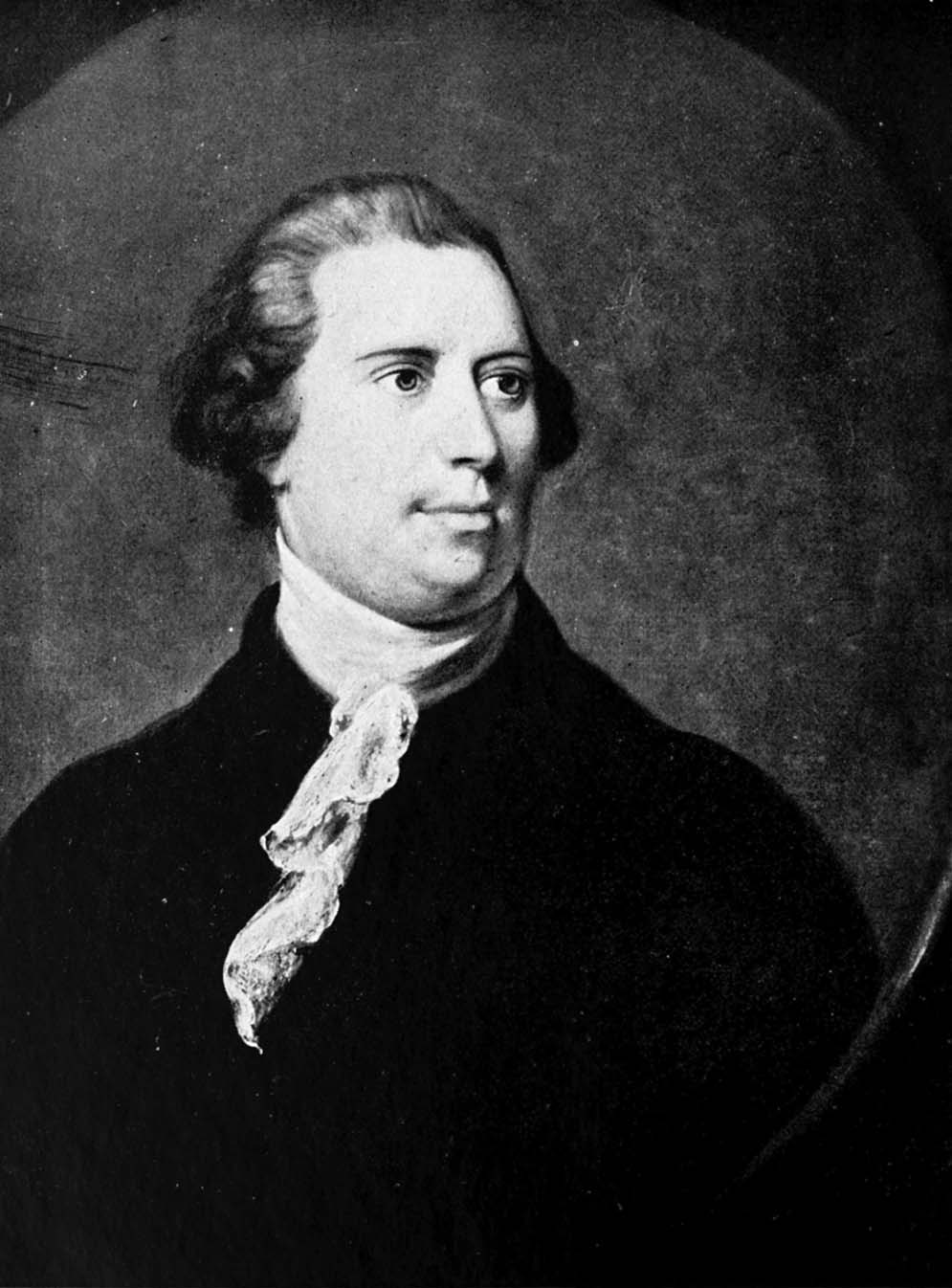
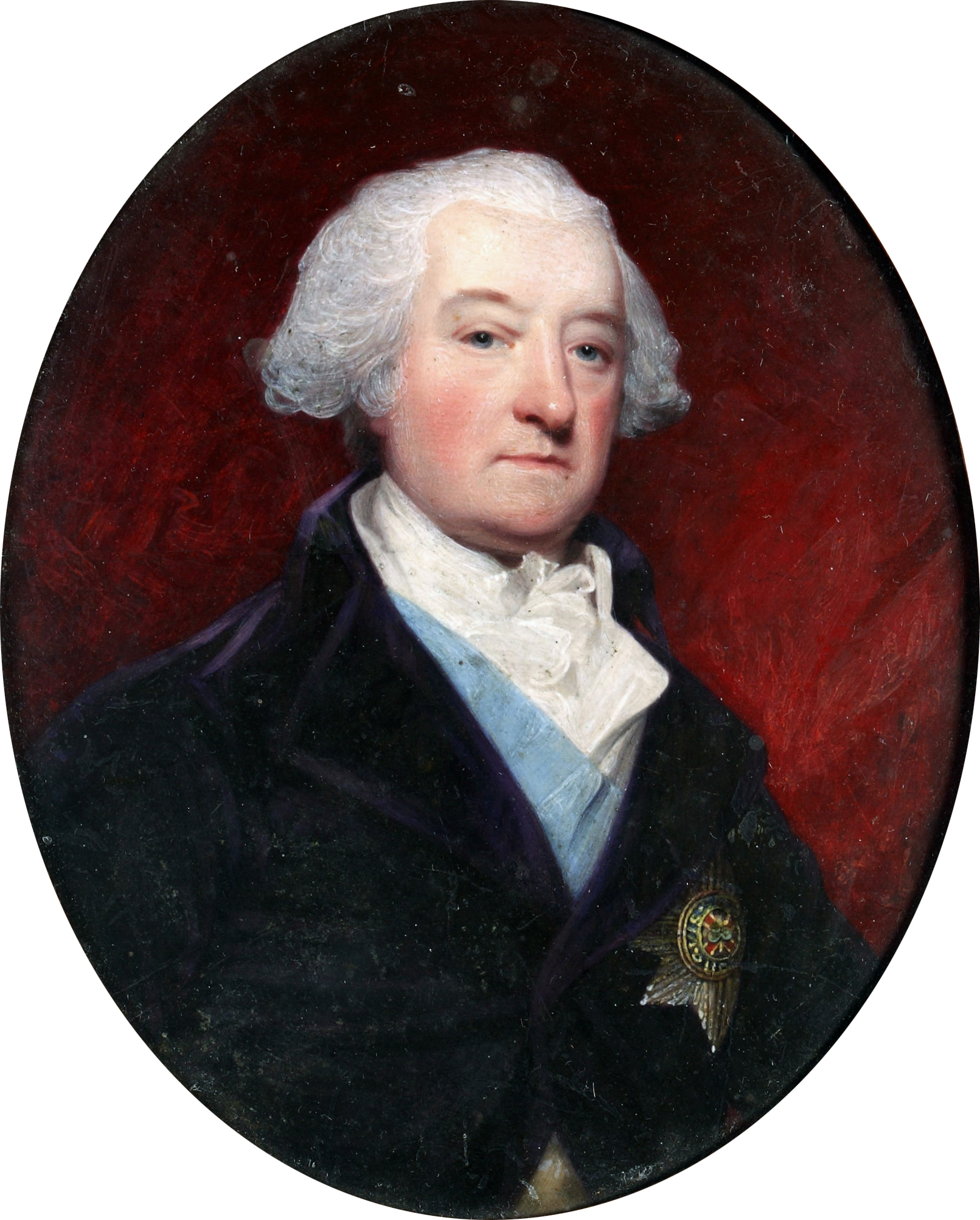
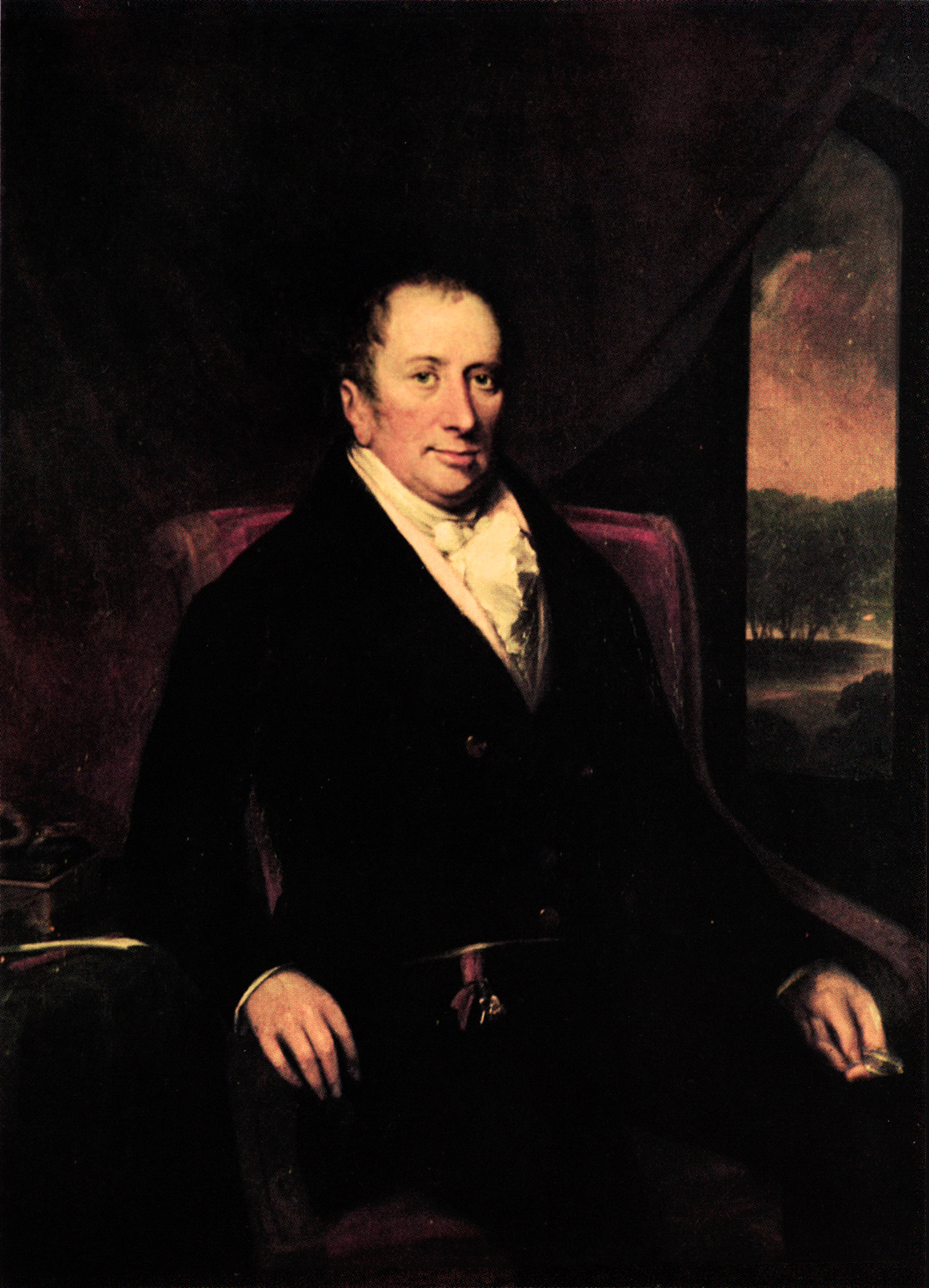
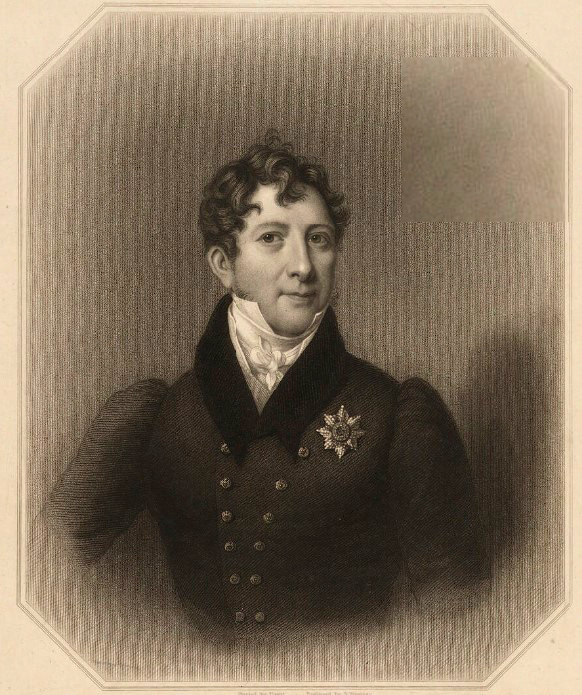
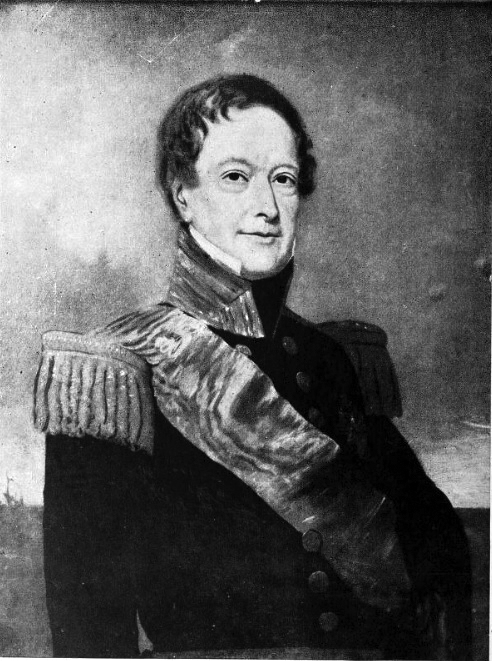
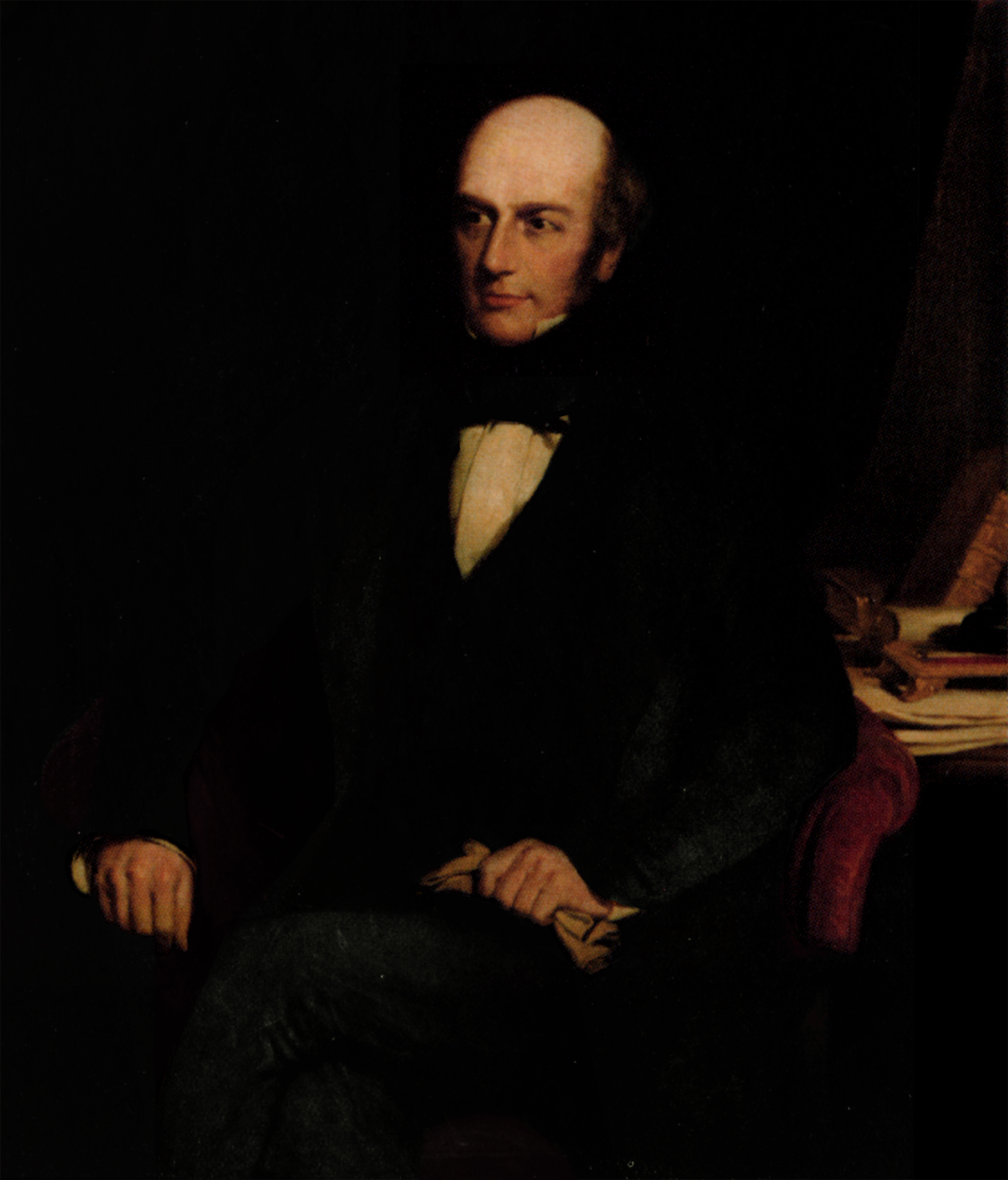
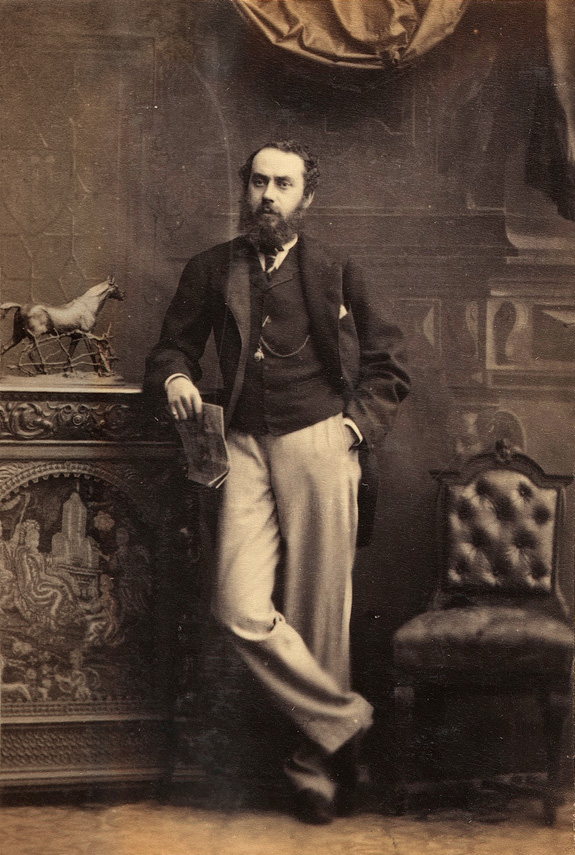
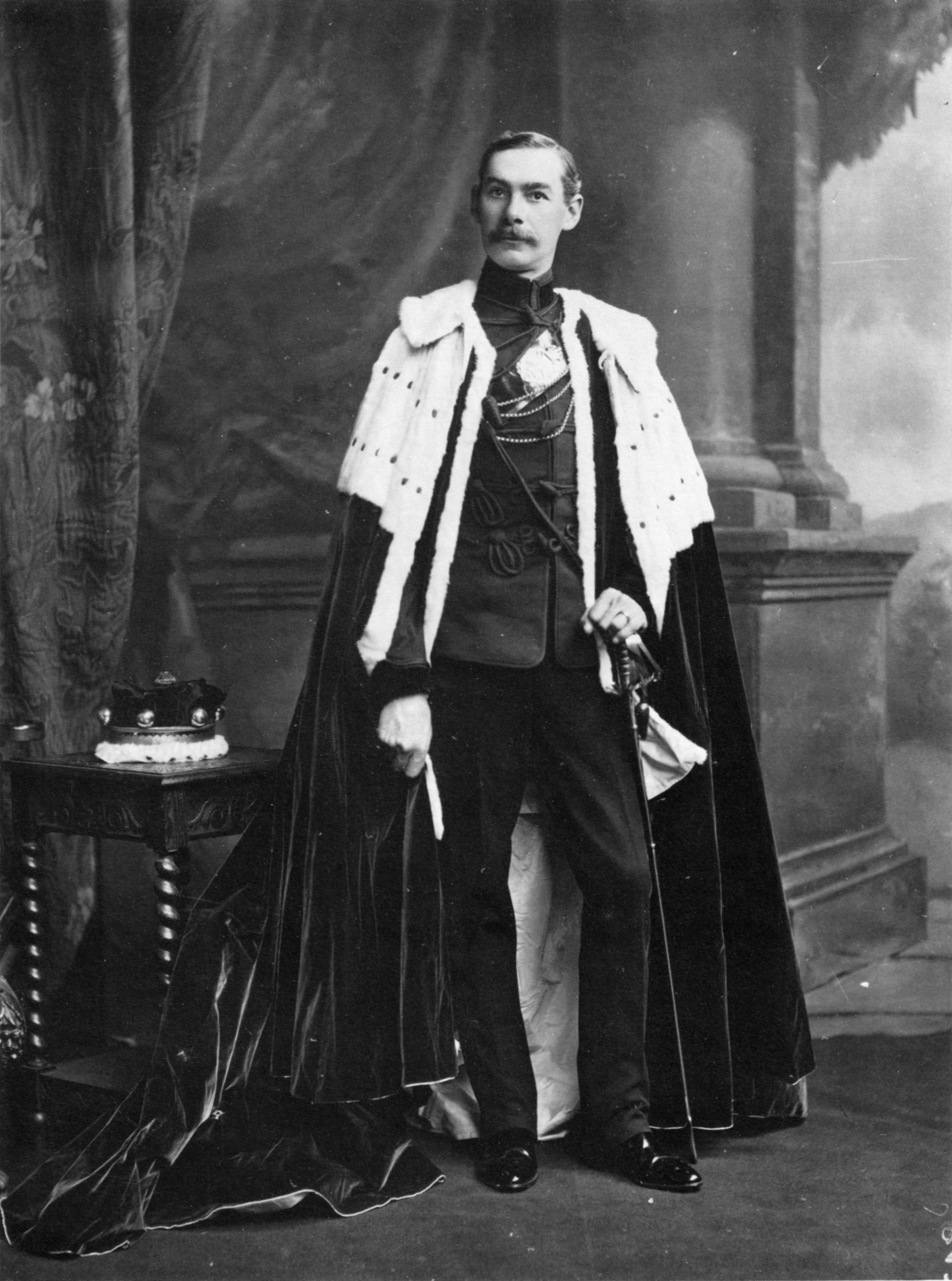
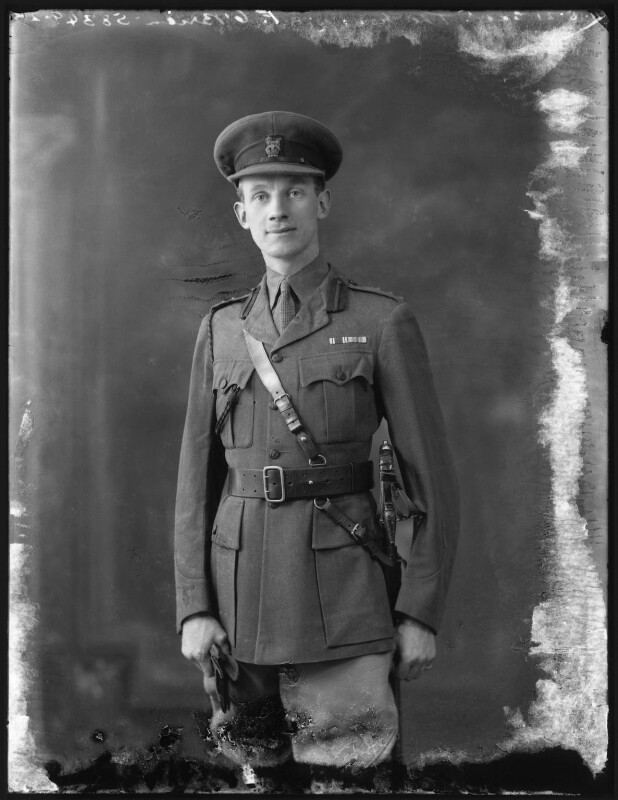
934-942 (Note: Deduced from: • The An Leabhar Muimhneach king list which states that Lorcáin succeeded Reabachán Mac Mothla. • The death date of Reabachán Mac Mothla being 934 (as stated in annals). • The death date of Lorcáin as given in O'Harts Pedigrees (942 AD).); Lorcáin
942-951; Cinnéidigh
951-953; Lachtna	953-970; King of Munster; 970-976; Mathgamain	976-978; King of Munster; 978-1002; High King of Ireland; 1002-1014; Brian; Bórumha; Ua Briain
1014-1025; High King of Ireland; 1025-1063; Donnchad	Tadhg died 1023
Murchad	King of Munster; 1063-1072; King of Dublin; 1072; High King of Ireland; 1072-1086; Toirdhealbhach
King of Munster; 1086; Tadhg	King of Dublin; 1075-1086; King of Munster; 1086-1101; 1115-1118 (disputed); High King of Ireland; 1101-1114 1118-1119; Muircheartach	King of Munster; 1114-1115; 1115-1118 (disputed); Diarmaid
King of the Isles; 1111-1112 1115; Domhnall	1119-1138; King of Munster; 1138-1142 (claimant); Conchubhar na Cathrach	King of Munster; 1142–1151 (claimant) 1154-1165; Toirdhealbhach	1151-1154; Tadhg
1157; Conchubhar	Muircheartach	King of Munster; 1167-1168 (claimant); Muircheartach	King of Munster; 1168-1194 (claimant); Domhnall Mór	Diarmaid
1194; Muircheartach; Dall	1198; Conchubhar; Ruadh	1198-1242; Donnchadh; Cairbreach
1242-1268; Conchubhar na Siudane
Tadhg; Cael Uisce died v.p 1259; Clann Tadhg	1268-1276; Brian Ruadh; Clann Briain
1276-1306; Toirdhealbhach Mór	Donnchadh	Domhnaill
1306-1311; Donnchadh	1317-1343; Muircheartach	1350–1360; Diarmaid	1311-1313; Diarmaid	1313-1317; Donnchadh	1343-1350; Brian Bán
1360–1369; Mathgamain; Maonmhaighe	1375–1398 (claimant); Toirdhealbhach; Maol
1369–1400; Brian; Sreamhach	1400-1426; Conchubhar
1426–1438; Tadhg an Glemore	1438-1444; Mathgamain; Dall	1444-1459; Toirdhealbhach; Bóg
1459-1461 (claimant); Donnchadh	1459-1466; Tadhg an Chomhaid	1466-1496; Conchubhar na Srona	1496-1498; Toirdhealbhach; Óg
1498-1528; Toirdhealbhach; Donn
1528–1539; Conchubhar	1539–1543; Last King of Thomond 1st Earl of Thomond; 1543–1551 1st Baron Inchiquin; 1543–1551; Murchadh; Carrach
Donough; 2nd Earl of Thomond (Note: Via special remainder from his uncle.); 1551-1553	Dermot; 2nd Baron Inchiquin; 1551–1557	Donough died 1582
Connor; 3rd Earl of Thomond; 1553-1581	Murrough; 3rd Baron Inchiquin; 1557–1573	Connor died 1603
Donough; 4th Earl of Thomond; 1581-1624	Daniel; 1st Viscount Clare; 1662-1663	Murrough; 4th Baron Inchiquin; 1573–1597	Donough died 1634
Henry; 5th Earl of Thomond; 1624-1639	Barnabas; 6th Earl of Thomond; 1639-1657	Connor; 2nd Viscount Clare; 1663-1670	Dermot; 5th Baron Inchiquin; 1597–1624	Connor died 1651
Henry; 7th Earl of Thomond; 1657-1691	Daniel; 3rd Viscount Clare; 1670-1691	Murrough; 6th Baron Inchiquin; 1624–1674; 1st Earl of Inchiquin; 1654–1674	Donough; 1st Baronet of Leameneh; 1686-1717
Henry Horatio; Lord Ibrackan died v.p 1690	Daniel; 4th Viscount Clare; 1691-1693	Charles; 5th Viscount Clare; 1693-1706	William; 2nd Earl of Inchiquin; 7th Baron of Inchiquin; 1674–1692	Lucius died v.p 1717
Henry; 8th Earl of Thomond; 1691-1741	Charles; 6th Viscount Clare; 1706-1761; 9th Earl of Thomond (titular); 1741-1761	William; 3rd Earl of Inchiquin; 8th Baron of Inchiquin; 1692–1719	Edward; 2nd Baronet of Leameneh; 1717-1765
Charles; 7th Viscount Clare; 10th Earl of Thomond (titular); 1761-1774	William; 4th Earl of Inchiquin; 9th Baron of Inchiquin; 1719–1777	James died 1771	Lucius Henry; 3rd Baronet of Leameneh; 1765-1795
Murrough; 5th Earl of Inchiquin; 10th Baron of Inchiquin; 1777–1808; 1st Marquess of Thomond; 1800-1808	Edward Dominic died 1801	Edward; 4th Baronet of Leameneh; 1795-1837
William; 2nd Marquess of Thomond; 6th Earl of Inchiquin; 11th Baron of Inchiquin; 1808-1846	James; 3rd Marquess of Thomond; 7th Earl of Inchiquin; 12th Baron of Inchiquin; 1846-1855	Lucius; 5th Baronet of Leameneh; 1837-1855; 13th Baron Inchiquin; 1855-1872
Edward Donogh; 14th Baron Inchiquin; 1872-1900
Lucius William; 15th Baron Inchiquin; 1900-1929	Murrough died 1934
Donough Edward Foster; 16th Baron Inchiquin; 1929-1968	Phaedrig Lucius Ambrose; 17th Baron Inchiquin; 1968-1982	Fionn Myles Maryons died 1977	Murrough Richard died 2000
Conor Myles John; 18th Baron Inchiquin; 1982-2023	Conor John Anthony; 19th Baron Inchiquin; 2023-present

== See also ==
- Irish nobility
- Irish royal families
- List of people named O'Brien
- Irish clans
