= List of monarchs of Thomond =

Kings of Thomond
- Rí Tuamhain
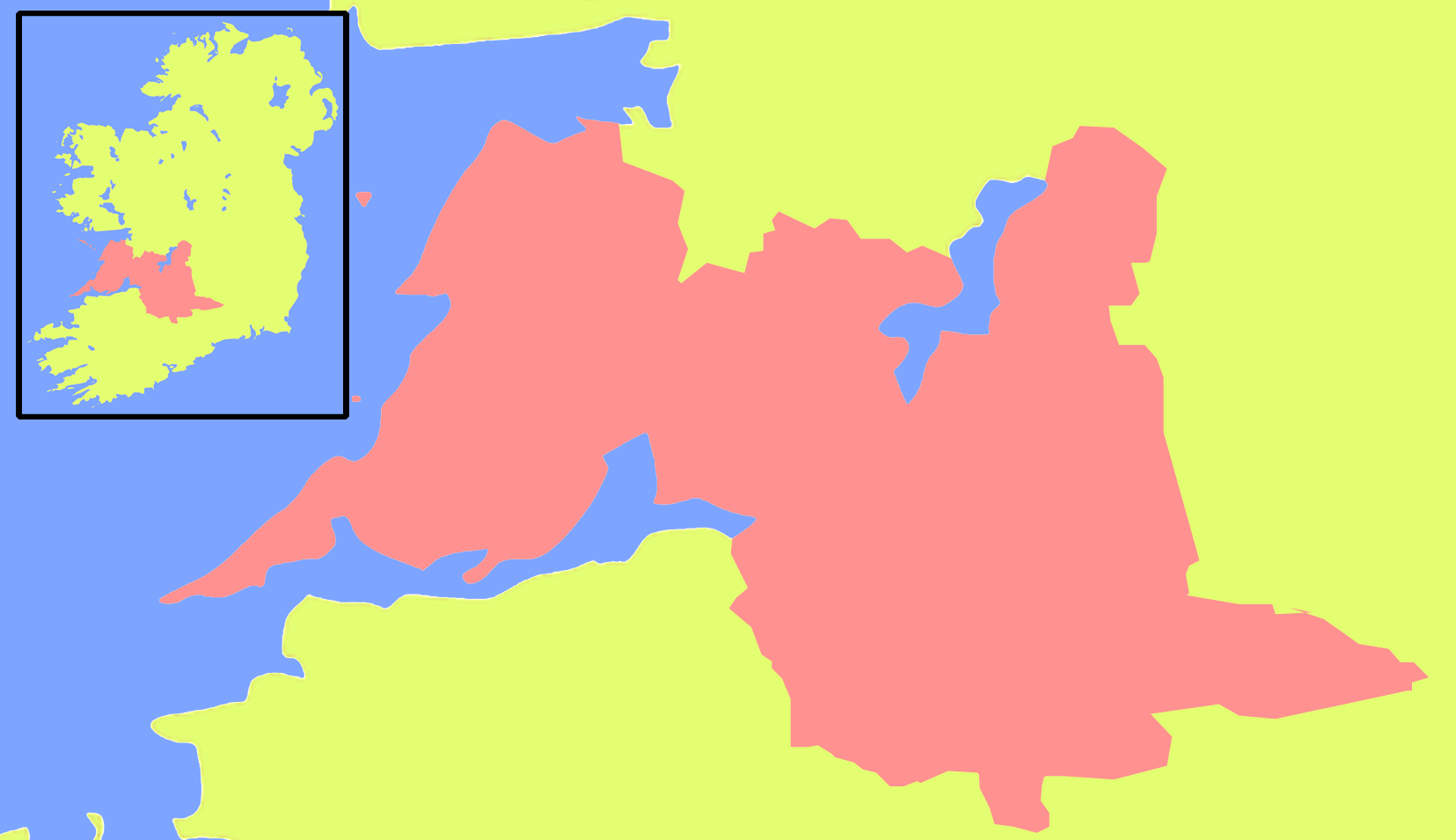
- Map of Thomond, c. 11th century.

Details
- Style: Rí Tuamhain
- First monarch: Conchobhar Ó Briain
- Last monarch: Murchadh Carrach Ó Briain
- Formed: 1118
- Abolished: 1543
- Residence: Clonroad
- Appointer: Tanistry

The kings of Thomond (Irish: Rí Tuamhain) ruled from the establishment of Thomond during the High Middle Ages, until the Early modern period. Thomond represented the legacy of Brian Bóruma and the High Kings of Ireland of his line who could not hold onto all of Munster, so had to partition the realm between themselves and Desmond, ruled by their rivals the Eóganachta. The Kings of Thomond were drawn from the leading kindred of the Dál gCais known as the Ó Briain. For centuries they fought off challenges from the Normans, including the de Clare family and internal conflict between factions. Eventually Murchadh Carrach Ó Briain decided to surrender and regrant his realm to the Kingdom of Ireland in 1543 and accepted the titles Baron Inchiquin and Earl of Thomond. These titles were recently held by Conor Myles John O'Brien (d.2023)

== Kings of Thomond ==
=== Ó Briain, 1118–1277 ===
Name	Portrait	Birth	Marriage(s)	Death
Conchobhar Ó Briain; 1118–1142		Son of Diarmuid Ó Briain	unknown	1142
Toirdhealbhach mac Diarmada Ua Briain; 1142–1167		Son of Diarmuid Ó Briain	unknown	1167
Muircheartach mac Toirdelbhach Ó Briain; 1167–1168		Son of Toirdelbhach mac Diarmaida Ó Briain	unknown	1168
Domhnall Mór Ó Briain; 1168–1194		Son of Toirdelbhach mac Diarmaida Ó Briain	Orlacan Ní Murchada; Four children	1194
Muircheartach Dall Ó Briain; 1194–1198; 1203–1210		Son of Domhnall Mór Ó Briain and Orlacan Ní Murchada	unknown	1210
Conchobhar Ruadh Ó Briain; 1198–1203		Son of Domhnall Mór Ó Briain and Orlacan Ní Murchada	unknown	1203
Donnchadh Cairbreach Ó Briain; 1210–1242		Son of Domhnall Mór Ó Briain and Orlacan Ní Murchada	unknown	1242
Conchobhar na Suidaine Ó Briain; 1242–1268		Son of Donnchadh Cairbreach Ó Briain	unknown	1268
Brian Ruadh Ó Briain; 1268–1276; 1277		Son of Conchobhar na Suidaine Ó Briain	unknown	1277

=== Ó Briain Clann Tadhg, 1276–1311 ===
Name	Portrait	Birth	Marriage(s)	Death
Toirdhealbhach Mór Ó Briain; 1276–1306		Son of Tadhg Cael Uisce Ó Briain	unknown	1306
Donnchadh mac Toirdelbach Ó Briain; 1306–1311		Son of Toirdelbach Ó Briain	unknown	1311

=== Ó Briain Clann Briain Ruadh, 1277–1284 ===
Name	Portrait	Birth	Marriage(s)	Death
Donnchadh mac Brian Ruadh Ó Briain; 1277–1284 (claimant)		Son of Brian Ruadh Ó Briain	unknown	1284

=== Ó Briain Clann Briain Ruadh, 1311–1317 ===
Name	Portrait	Birth	Marriage(s)	Death
Diarmuid Cléirech Ó Briain; 1311–1313		Son of Donnchadh mac Brian Ruadh Ó Briain	unknown	1313
Donnchadh mac Domhnall Ó Briain; 1313–1317		Son of Domhnall mac Brian Ruadh Ó Briain and Mairéad Nic Mathghamhna	unknown	1317

=== Ó Briain Clann Tadhg, 1317–1343 ===
Name	Portrait	Birth	Marriage(s)	Death
Muircheartach Ó Briain; 1317–1343		Son of Toirdhealbhach Mór Ó Briain	Éadaoin Nic Gormáin; Several children	1343

=== Ó Briain Clann Briain Ruadh, 1343–1350 ===
Name	Portrait	Birth	Marriage(s)	Death
Brian Bán Ó Briain; 1343–1350		Son of Domhnall mac Brian Ruadh Ó Briain and Mairéad Nic Mathghamhna	unknown	1350

=== Ó Briain Clann Tadhg, 1350–1543 ===
Name	Portrait	Birth	Marriage(s)	Death
Diarmuid mac Toirdelbach Ó Briain; 1350–1360		Son of Toirdelbach Ó Briain	unknown	1360
Mathghamhain Maonmhaighe Ó Briain; 1360–1369		Son of Muircheartach Ó Briain and Éadaoin Nic Gormáin	Úna Ní Conchubhair; Several children	1369
Brian Sreamhach Ó Briain; 1369–1400		Son of Mathghamhain Maonmhaighe Ó Briain and Úna Ní Conchubhair	Sláine Nic Con Mara; Several children	1400
Toirdelbhach Maol Ó Briain; 1375–1398 (claimant)		Son of Muircheartach Ó Briain and Éadaoin Nic Gormáin	unknown	1398
Conchobhar mac Mathghamhna Ó Briain; 1400–1426		Son of Mathghamhain Maonmhaighe Ó Briain and Úna Ní Conchubhair	unknown	1426
Tadhg an Glemore Ó Briain; 1426–1438		Son of Brian Sreamhach Ó Briain and Sláine Nic Con Mara	unknown	1438
Mathghamhain Dall Ó Briain; 1438–1444		Son of Brian Sreamhach Ó Briain and Sláine Nic Con Mara	unknown	1444
Toirdhealbhach Bóg Ó Briain; 1444–1459		Son of Brian Sreamhach Ó Briain and Sláine Nic Con Mara	Catherine Burke; Several children	1459
Tadhg an Chomhaid Ó Briain; 1459–1466		Son of Toirdhealbhach Bóg Ó Briain and Catherine Burke	Annabella Burke; Several children	1466
Donnchadh mac Mathghamhna Ó Briain; 1459–1461 (claimant)		Son of Mathghamhain Dall Ó Briain	unknown	1461
Conchobhar na Srona Ó Briain; 1466–1496		Son of Toirdhealbhach Bóg Ó Briain	unknown	1496
Toirdelbhach Óg Ó Briain; 1496–1498		Son of Toirdhealbhach Bóg Ó Briain and Catherine Burke	unknown	1498
Toirdhealbhach Donn Ó Briain; 1498–1528		Son of Tadhg an Chomhaid Ó Briain and Annabella Burke	Raghnailt Nic Con Mara; Several children Joan FitzMaurice; Several children	1528
Conchobhar mac Toirdhealbaig Ó Briain; 1528–1539		Son of Toirdelbhach Donn Ó Briain and Raghnailt Mac Con Mara	unknown	1539
Murchadh Carrach Ó Briain; 1539–1543		Son of Toirdelbhach Donn Ó Briain and Raghnait MacNamara	Eleanor FitzGerald	1551

== Line of Kings ==
Kings of Thomond

976-1014; Brian; Bórumha; Ua Briain
1014-1063; Donnchad	Tadhg
1063-1068; Murchad	1068-1086; Toirdhealbhach
1086; Tadhg	1114-1115; Diarmaid	1086-1114; 1115-1119; Muircheartach
1115; Domhnall	1142–1151; 1154-1167; Toirdhealbhach	1119-1142; Conchubhar na Cathrach	1143; 1151-1154; Tadhg
Conchubhar	1168-1194; Domhnall Mór	1167-1168; Muircheartach	Muircheartach	Diarmaid
1194; Muircheartach; Dall	1198-1242; Donnchadh; Cairbreach	1198; Conchubhar; Ruadh
1242-1268; Conchubhar na Siudane
Tadhg; Cael Uisce; Clann Tadhg	1268-1277; Brian Ruadh; Clann Briain
1276-1306; Toirdhealbhach Mór	Donnchadh	Domhnaill
1306-1311; Donnchadh	1317-1343; Muircheartach	1350–1360; Diarmaid	1311-1313; Diarmaid	1313-1317; Donnchadh	1343-1350; Brian Bán
1360–1369; Mathgamain; Maonmhaighe	1375–1398 (claimant); Toirdhealbhach; Maol
1369–1400; Brian; Sreamhach	1400-1426; Conchubhar
1426–1438; Tadhg an Glemore	1444-1459; Toirdhealbhach; Bóg	1438-1444; Mathgamain; Dall
1496-1498; Toirdhealbhach; Óg	1459-1466; Tadhg an Chomhaid	1466-1496; Conchubhar na Srona	1459-1461 (claimant); Donnchadh
1498-1528; Toirdhealbhach; Donn
1528–1539; Conchubhar	1539–1543; Murchadh; Carrach; Last King of Thomond

== See also ==
- List of High Kings of Ireland
- List of kings of Munster
- List of kings of Desmond
- List of kings of Ulster
- List of kings of Leinster
- List of kings of Connacht
- List of kings of Mide
