= Battle of Lough Raska =

Battle in Ireland, 1317

Coordinates: 53°7′34.98″N 9°3′58.24″W

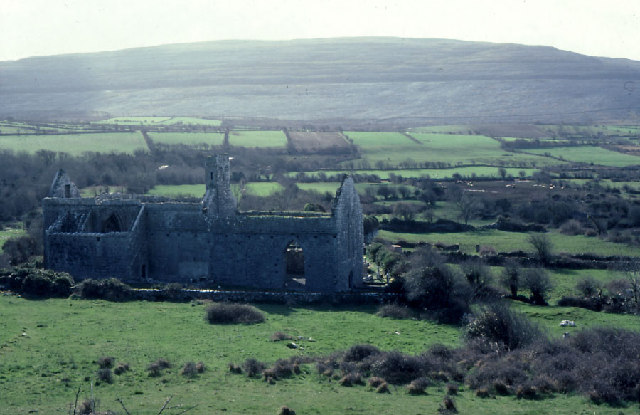
- Corcomroe Abbey and surrounding landscape
Date	15 August 1317
Location	near Corcomroe Abbey, County Clare, Ireland
Result	Clann Tadhg Victory

Belligerents
Clann Tadhg	Clann Briain

Commanders and leaders
Muircheartach Ó Briain; Diarmait Ó Briain	Donnchadh Ó Briain †

Strength
~9,000	~9,000

The Battle of Lough Raska (Irish: Loch Rasca) or Battle of Corcomroe (Irish: Corca Mrua) took place on 15 August 1317 near Corcomroe Abbey in north County Clare, Ireland. It was part of a struggle for power between Clann Briain and Clann Tadhg, rival septs of the O'Brien dynasty, and was also part of the Anglo-Norman wars in Ireland. Forces loyal to Muircheartach Ó Briain were commanded by Diarmait Ó Briain in a pitched battle against Donnchadh Ó Briain, who was an ally of Mathghamhain Ó Briain and Richard de Clare. Both armies were about 9,000 men each. Diarmait Ó Briain's forces were victorious. This would be a precursor to the Battle of Dysert O'Dea.
