= Conor na Siudane Ua Briain =

King of Thomond in medieval Ireland

Conchobhar Ruadh Ua Briain
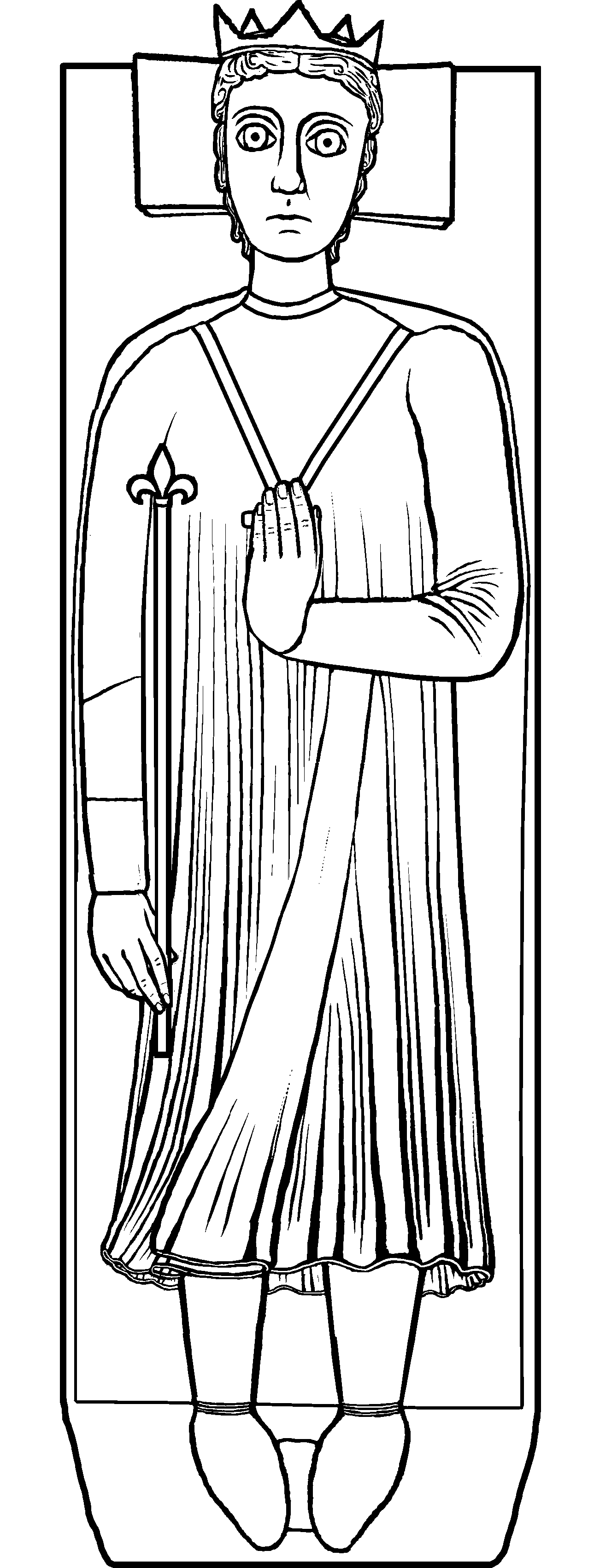
- Tomb effigy of Conor O'Brien, Corcomroe Abbey

King of Thomond
- Reign: 1242-1268
- Predecessor: Donnchadh Cairbreach Ó Briain
- Successor: Brian Ruadh Ó Briain
- Born: c. 1200; Kingdom of Thomond
- Died: 1267; Siudane, The Burren, Kingdom of Thomond
- Spouse: Mór Mac Conmara
- Issue: Tadhg Cael Uisce Ó Briain; Brian Ruadh Ó Briain; Murtogh Ó Briain
- House: Ua Briain
- Father: Donnchadh Cairbreach Ó Briain
- Mother: Sadhbh Ua Cinnéidigh

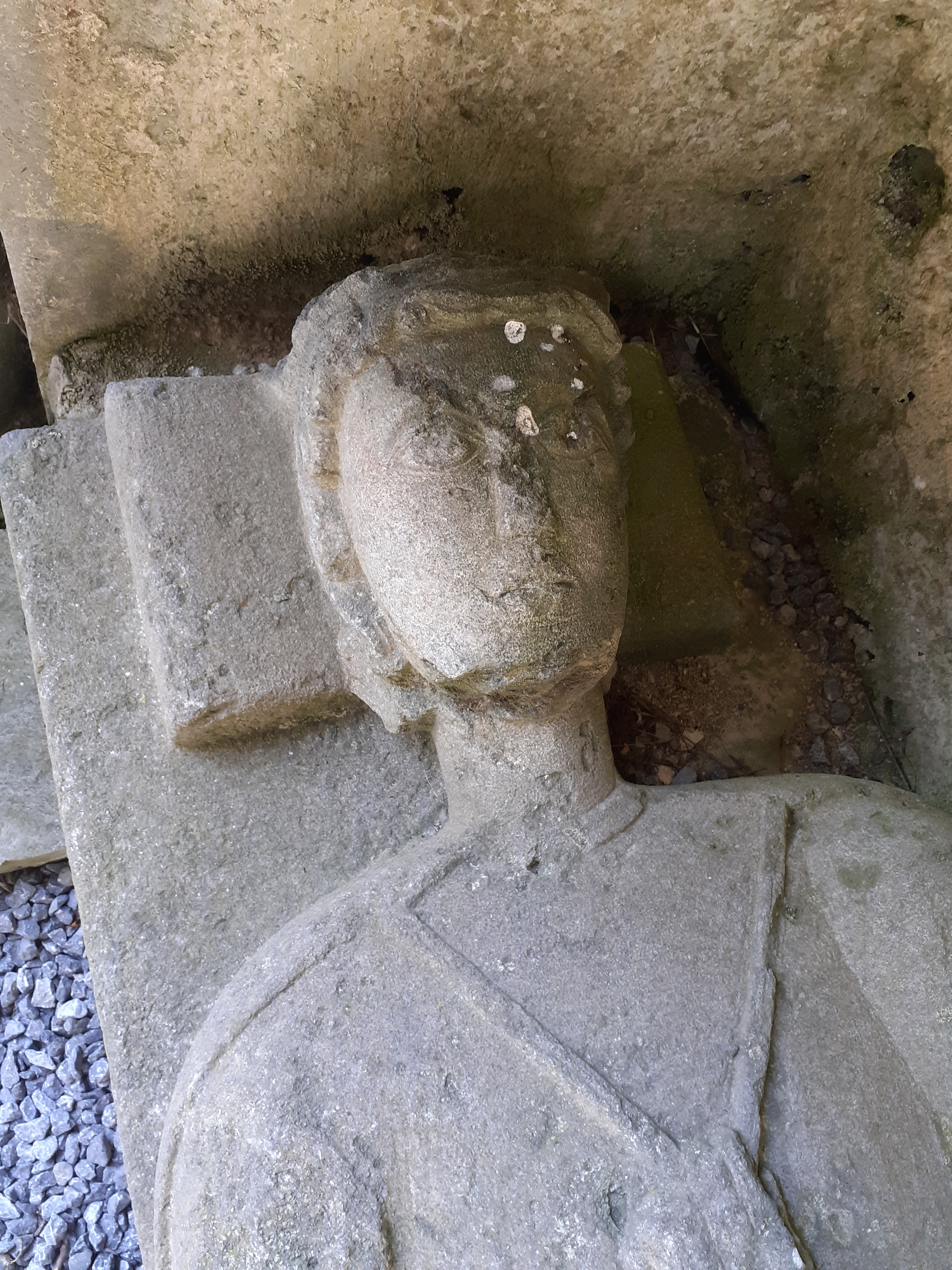
Close up of tomb effigy in Corcomroe Abbey where he was buried.

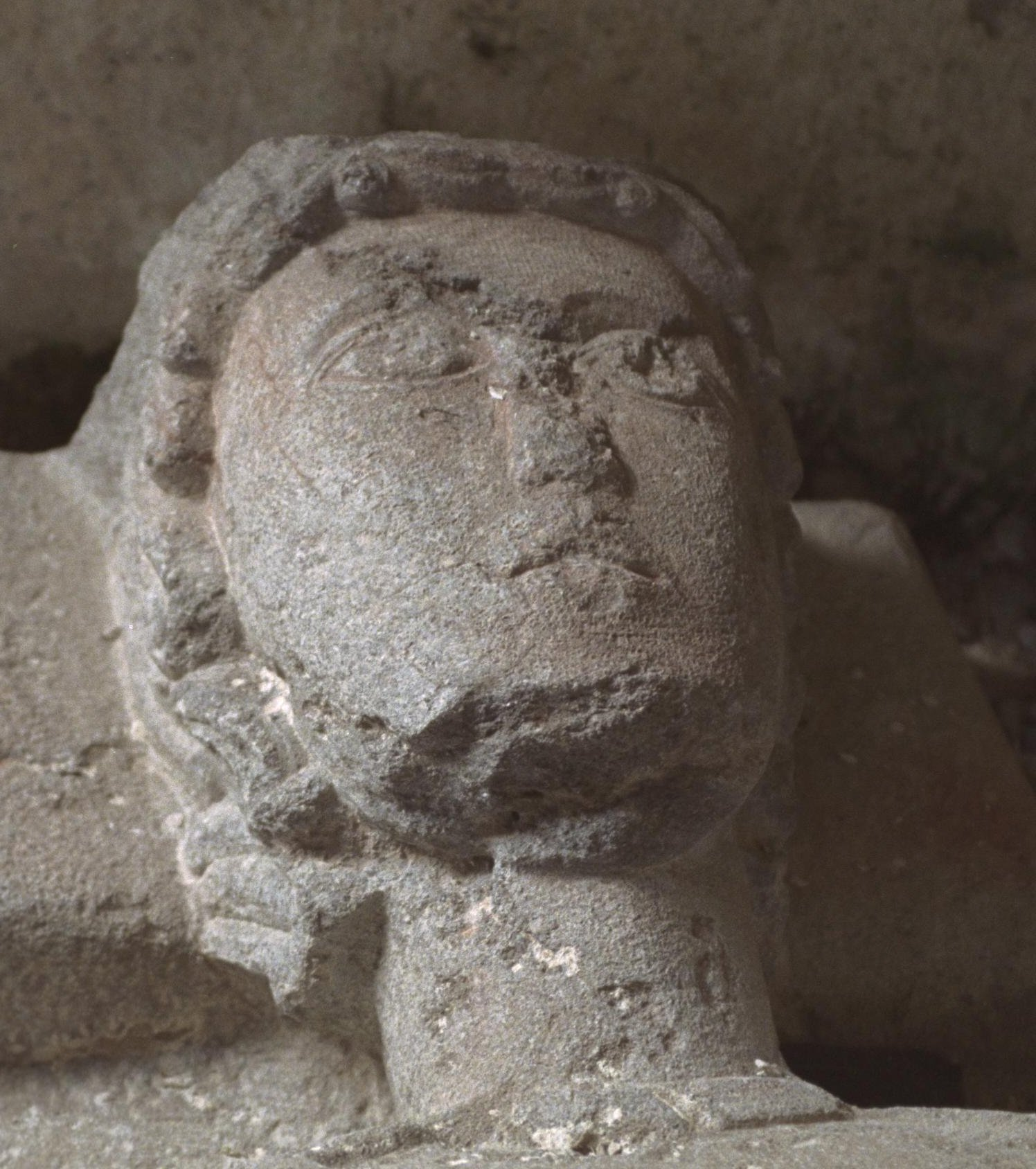

Conor na Siudane Ua Briain (epithet deriving from the place of his slaying) also by the descriptives "Roe" (Conor Roe Ua Briain) and also as "broad-eyed" was a King of Thomond, in medieval Ireland. He was the son of Donnchadh Cairbreach Ó Briain.

During his reign English interference in Thomond became very marked. Tradraige was granted to Robert de Musegros, and the castles of Ogormack (Clare) and Traddery (Bunratty) were built in 1249-1253. Conor, however, by offer of yearly tribute, was confirmed in the rest of Thomond and the English were nearly completely expelled in 1257 by him and his son Tadhg. (Note: See Westropp page 143.)

In the year 1267, accompanied by the O'Deas, the O'Hehirs, and other tribes of Uí Cormaic and Cineal Fermaic, Conor marched into Burren to enforce the submission of the inhabitants, and was opposed by Conor Carrach O'Loughlin, who had been informed by his scouts that the prince of Thomond had but a comparatively small force. O'Loughlin, besides his own followers, was assisted by the sons of Domnall Connachtach O'Brien, uncle to Conor, the reigning prince, who had settled in the north-west of Thomond for some time past. The armies met at the wood of Siudan, in the present parish of Drumcreehy, and a battle ensued, in which Conor lost his life. With him, according to the annalists of the Four Masters, who record the event at the year 1268:.

“The age of Christ, 1268. Conor Roe O’Brien, Lord of Thomond, Seoinin, (i.e. little John) his son, his daughter, his daughter’s son, i.e., the son of Rory O’Grady, Duvloughlin O’Loughlin, Thomas O’Beollan, and a number of others, were slain by Dermot, the son of Murtough O’Brien, for which he himself was afterwards killed; and Brian, the son of Conor O’Brien, then assumed the lordship of Thomond.”

The Cistercian monks buried him in the nearby Corcomroe Abbey and a stone effigy was built of him which is still well preserved. It was probably made by the same artisan who made the effigy of King Felim O'Connor (died 1265) in the Priory of St. Mary in Roscommon as the monuments are generally identical in their clothing and details, although this second royal effigy is in a much worst state of degradation with the face being entirely obliterated.

On his death in 1268 he was succeeded by his son Brian Ruadh Ó Briain. His eldest son Tadhg Cael Uisce had pre-deceased him in 1259. A feud which was fostered by the Norman de Clares emerged between the descendants of Tadhg (Clann Tadhg) and Brian (Clann Briain) over the kingship of Thomond and lasted until the 14th century with the senior Clann Tadhg eventually being victorious.

== Family and issue ==
He married Mór, daughter of McNamara, Lord of Uí Coileann (Clann Cullin) and had issue:

- Tadhg Cael Uisce Ó Briain
- Brian Ruadh Ó Briain
- Seonín (Little John) Ó Briain
- Murtogh Ó Briain
