= Tadhg an Chomhaid Ó Briain =

King of Thomond

Teige O'Brien or Tadhg a'Chomhaid Ó Briain was Lord of Thomond from 1459 to his death in 1466, and Chief of Clan O'Brien.

== Reign ==
He built the tower of Inchiquin Castle shortly before his father's death in 1459 and made it his new residence, being the first O'Brien since the expulsion of the Normans in 1318 who had ceased to inhabit Clonroad as his chief residence. He took his distinctive nickname (an Chomhaid) from the lands which he had built his new head-quarters on.

He succeeded his father Toirdhealbhach Bóg Ó Briain upon his death in 1459. He collected tribute from O'Neill in 1463.

Dubhaltach Mac Fhirbhisigh described Tadhg's last feat of arms thus:
a.d. 1466. Thady fitz Torly O’Brian, King of Tuamond, marched with an army (in this summer) over the Shinnan southwards, and we heard not of such an host with any of his name or Ancestors since Brian Boroa was conquering of Irland; so that the Gwills, Irish of Desmond and Iarmond [i.e. West Munster] all obeyed him; and he bribed the Gwills, i.e. old Irish of Linster, so that they were working his coming to Tara, but he retired to his house, after he had conquered the country of the Clan-Williams all, and the county of Lymbrick, it being made sure to him from the Earl [of Desmond, then Lord Deputy] in liew of granting peace to the said Earl and to his country, and the townsmen or cittizens of Lyrabrick gave 60 marks yearely to him [O’Brien] for ever; afterwards he died of a feaver in his owne house (Inchiquin Castle), and it was comonly repotted that it was the multitude’s envious hearts and eyes has shortened his dayes.

He was described in the Annals of Loch Cé as "the torch of valour and the prowess of Leth-mogha".

== Family ==
He married Annabella Burke, daughter of Ulick Ruadh Burke, Lord of Clanrickarde and by her had issue:

- Toirdhealbhach Donn Ó Briain
- Domhnaill
- Donnchadh
- Muircheartach Garbh
- Murchadh
- Diarmaid Cleireach
