= Toirdhealbhach Mór Ó Briain =

Middle ages Irish monarch

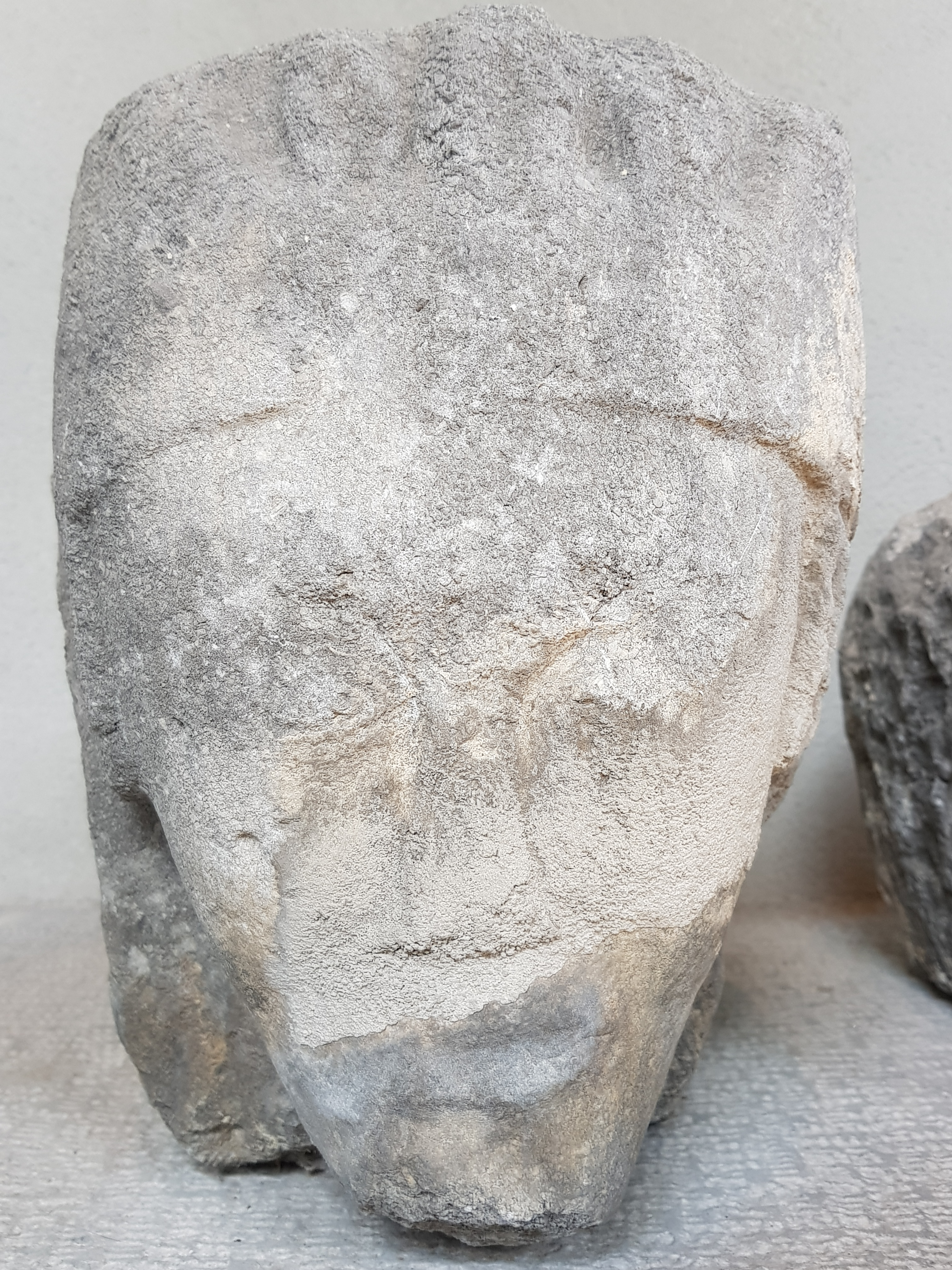
Effigy in Ennis Friary.

Toirdhealbhach Mór Ó Briain (born c. 1250, died 1306) was King of Thomond (1276-1306) and the main protagonist of Seán mac Ruaidhri Mac Craith's epic Cathreim Thoirdhealbhaigh describing his struggles against the Norman Thomas de Clare.

== Reign ==
He was the son of Tadhg Cael Uisce Ó Briain. He came to power after deposing his uncle Brian Ruadh Ó Briain in 1276 and expelling him from Thomond. Brian then became an ally of Thomas de Clare who would restore him to power and in return be allowed to colonize all the land between Quin and Limerick, he succeeded and drove out Toirdhealbhach. Toirdhealbhach then enlisted the aid of his cousin William de Burgh and the MacNamara and O'Dea clans. He defeated the combined forces of Brian Ruadh and Thomas de Clare in 1277 and became King of Thomond.

Thomas de Clare continued to attempt to undermine Toirdhealbhach's power and supported Brian Ruadh's son Donnchadh against Toirdhealbhach until Donnchadh was drowned in 1284.

He died in 1306 and was succeeded by his son Donnchadh.

== Family ==
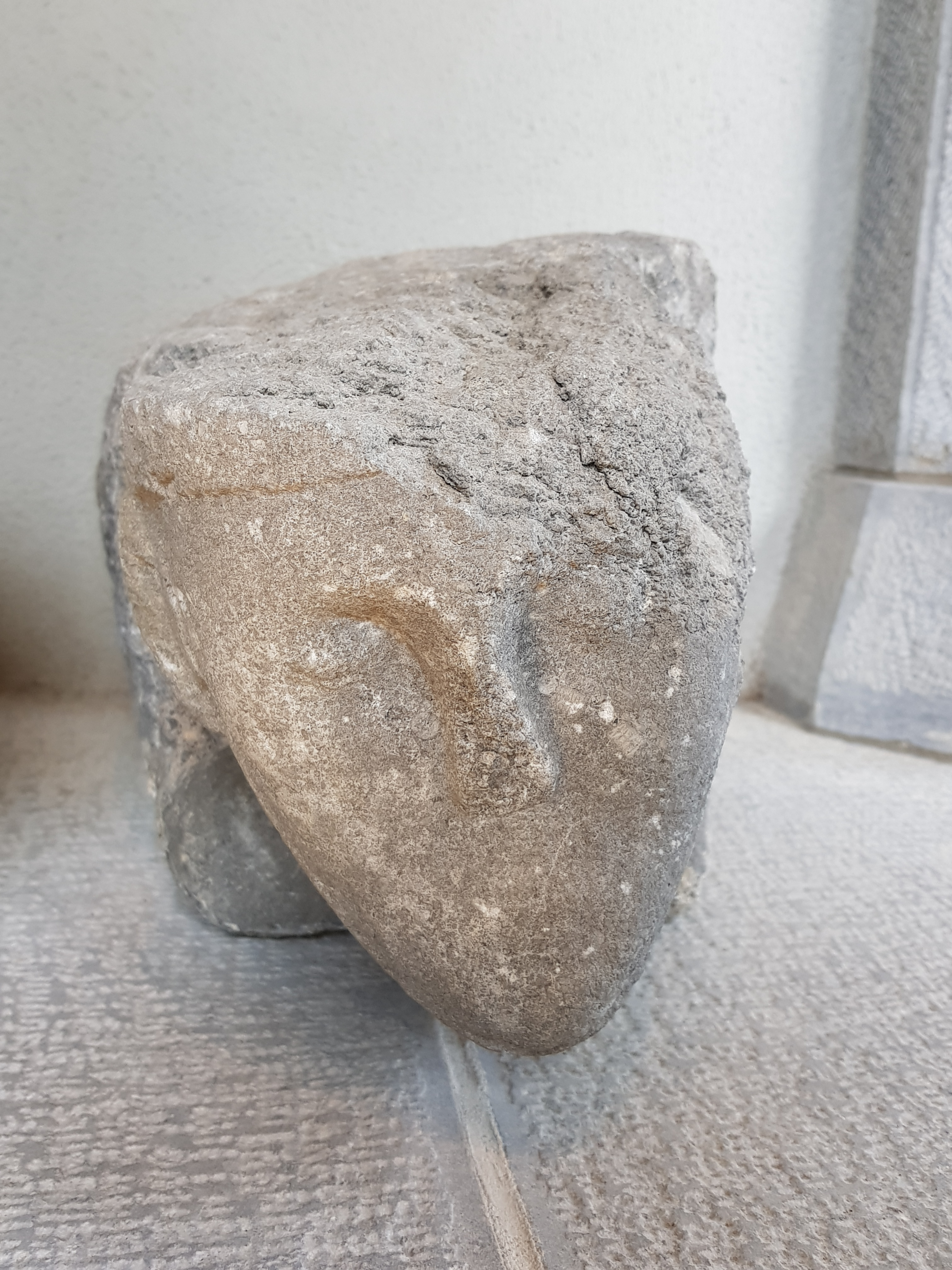
Unknown wife of Toirdhealbhach.

He married firstly Sadhbh daughter of Tadhg Mac Carthy (son of Donogh Carrthain MacCarthy Mór, King of Desmond) and had possibly by her.

- Donnchadh (who succeeded him), King of Thomond

He married secondly Orflath daughter of Domhnaill Óge Mac Carthaigh Mór, King of Desmond and had issue:

- Brian
- Muircheartach, King of Thomond
- Diarmaid, King of Thomond

He married thirdly Sadhbh Ó Cinnéidigh and had issue:

- Conchobhar
- Domhnaill
