= Mathghamhain Maonmhaighe Ó Briain =

Mathghamhain Maonmhaighe Ó Briain was King of Thomond during 1360–69. His name is Anglicized as Mathghamhain O'Brien of Maonmhagh.

Mathghamhain was the son of Muircheartach Ó Briain King of Thomond and was preceded by his uncle Dairmaid macToirdelbaig O'Brien.

His son Brian Sreamhach MacMathghamhna O'Brien succeeded him as King of Thomond. He died in 1369 and was buried in Ennis Abbey, County Clare, Ireland.

His nickname, Maonmhaighe, derived from his foster-home.
