= Brian Sreamhach Ua Briain =

Brian Sreamhach Ua Briain (died 1400), also known as Briain Catha-an-Aonaigh Ó Briain, and Brian Ó Briain, was King of Thomond from 1369 to 1400. He was the son of Mathghamhain Maonmhaighe Ó Briain. In about 1370 or 1371, he defeated and captured Gerald FitzGerald, 3rd Earl of Desmond near Limerick. On his death in 1400 he was succeeded by his brother Conchobhar, who was succeeded on his death in 1426 by Brian's son Tadhg na Glaoidh Mór.

== Family ==
He married firstly Sláine, daughter of Lochlann Láidir Mac Conmara and had issue: Tadhg na Glaoidh Mór, Mathgamain Dall, and Toirdhealbhach Bóg. He married secondly Margaret Fitzgerald, daughter of James Fitzgerald of Desmond and had issue: Brian Udhar Catha.
