= Muircheartach Ó Briain =

King of Thomond

Muircheartach Ó Briain was King of Thomond from 1317 until his death in 1343.

== Reign ==
He was the son of Toirdhealbhach Mór Ó Briain. He was expelled by his Clann Briain cousin King Donnchad Ó Briain in 1314. He came to power after Donnchad supported Edward Bruce and lost the support of Richard de Clare, then fleeing to join the Bruce camp in Connacht. After Donnchad's departure Muircheartach came to power. He fought the Battle of Lough Raska where the rival Clann Briain whom the Norman de Clare's had supported were defeated. He banished de Clare's protege Mathgamain O'Briain from Thomond and then fought him at the Battle of Dysert O'Dea where his forces were victorious in driving the Normans from Thomond and Richard de Clare was killed.

== Family ==
He married Étaín, the daughter of his standard bearer MacGorman of Ibrickane and had two known sons:

- Mathghamhain Maonmhaighe
- Toirdhealbhach Maol
