= Toirdhealbhach Bóg Ó Briain =

Toirdhealbhach Bóg Ó Briain was King of Thomond from 1446 to his death in 1459.

== Reign ==
He was the son of Brian Sreamhach Ua Briain. His brother Mathgamain Dall had deposed his brother Tadhg in 1438. Mathgamain Dall was deposed in 1446 by The Mac William of Clanricarde and Toirdhealbhach Bóg was put in his stead. He reigned until his death in 1459. He was succeeded by his nephew Donnchadh, a son of Mathgamain Dall who ruled briefly before being succeeded by Toirdhealbhach's son Tadhg an Chomhaid.

== Family ==
He married Catherine, daughter of Ulick Ruadh Burke and had issue:

- Tadhg an Chomhaid Ó Briain
- Donnchadh Tadhg, Bishop of Killaloe
- Conchubhar na Srona Ó Briain
- Toirdhealbhach Óg Ó Briain
- Mathgamain
- Cinnéidigh
- Brian Ganeagh
- Muircheartach Beag
