= Tadhg Cael Uisce Ó Briain =

Tánaiste of Thomond (d. 1259)

Tadhg Cael Uisce Ó Briain (born c. 1230, died 1259) was the eldest son of Conchobhar na Siudane Ó Briain and Tánaiste of Thomond.

== Life ==
He received the suffix "Cael Uisce" from the having attended the conference of Cael Uisce on behalf of his father and refusing to acknowledge Brian Ua Néill as High King. He died in 1259, pre-deceasing his father.

== Family ==
He married Fionnuala, daughter of Cinnéidigh, son of Cinnéidigh, son of Muirchertach Ua Briain and had issue:

- Toirdhealbhach Mór Ó Briain
- Domhnaill
