= Dál gCais =

Gaelic Irish tribe

- Dál gCais
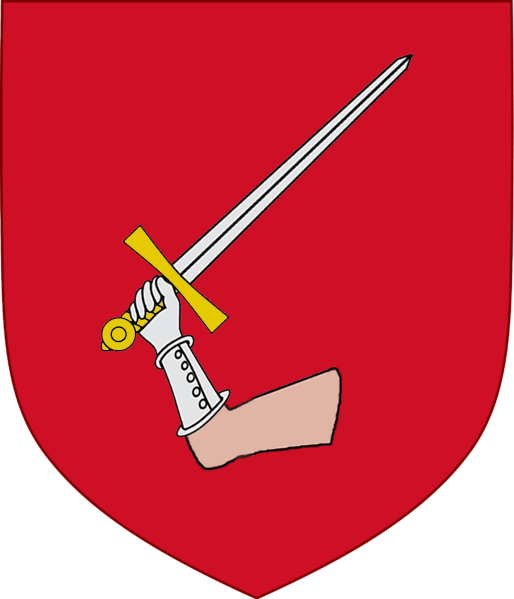
- The early Dál gCais carried on their banners of "red, purple, gold and brown" of unknown design. Later, the O'Briens (the main sept of the Dalcassions) began using a coat of arms featuring the Claíomh Solais of Nuada. One of the Four Treasures of the Tuatha Dé Danann.

Profile
- Country: Ireland
- Region: Thomond
- Ancestry: Déisi Tuisceart
- Ethnicity: Gaelic Irish
- Founder: Cas

Chief
- Conor John Anthony, 19th Baron Inchiquin
- Historic seat: Dromoland Castle
Septs of Dál gCais
- O'Brien
- Moloney
- O'Kennedy
- Galvin
- O'Mahony
- MacConsidine
- McMahon
- O'Gorman
- Griffin
- MacLysaght
- O'Reagan
- O'Kelleher
- Boland
- O'Casey
- Power
- Twomey
- O’Hurley
- Eustace
- Ahearne
- MacGrath
- Quick
- O'Meara
- Scanlan
- MacArthur
- Cosgrave
- O'Hogan
- Lonergan
- McInerney
- O'Noonan
- Coombe
- O'Brennan
- Glinn
- Muldowney
- O'Hurley
- MacNamara
- O'Halloran
- O'Grady
- Tubridy
- Hartigan
- Hourigan
- Durkin
- Killeen
- Hogg
- O'Dea
- O'Quin
- O'Heffernan
- Kielty
- Perkin
- Harley
- Flood
- Torrens
- Stoney
- Hickey
- O'Hay
- Hassett
- Clancy
- Slattery
- Shanahan
Kindreds
- Uí Caisin
- Uí Bloid (Síl Cennétich)
- Ui Fearmaic
Titles
*High Kings of Ireland
- Kings of Dublin
- Kings of Mann & the Isles
- Kings of Munster
- Kings of Thomond
- Kings of Ormond
- Kings of Desmond (claim)

Dál gCais ([ˌd̪ˠaːlˠ ˈɡaʃ], sometimes known as the Dalcassians) are a Gaelic Irish clan, generally accepted by contemporary scholarship as being a branch of the Déisi Muman, that became very powerful in Ireland during the 10th century. Their genealogies claimed descent from Tál Cas. Their known ancestors are the subject of The Expulsion of the Déisi tale and one branch of their blood-line went on to rule the petty kingdom of Dyfed in Wales during the 4th century; probably in alliance with the Roman Emperor Magnus Maximus.

Brian Boru is perhaps the best-known king from the dynasty and was responsible to a significant degree for carving out their fortunes. The family had built a power base on the banks of the River Shannon and Brian's brother Mahon became their first King of Munster, taking the throne from the rival Eóganachta. This influence was greatly extended under Brian who became High King of Ireland, following a series of wars against Hiberno-Norse kingdoms and the Chiefs of other Irish clans, before dying famously at the Battle of Clontarf in 1014. Following this the Dál gCais provided three more High Kings of Ireland; Donnchad mac Briain, Toirdelbach Ua Briain and Muirchertach Ua Briain.

From the 12th–16th centuries, the Dál gCais contented themselves with being reduced to the Kingdom of Thomond. They attempted to claim the Kingdom of Desmond for a time, but ultimately the MacCarthys held it. The Kennedys also held the Kingdom of Ormond for a time. Some of the better known septs included O'Brien, Moloney, O’Hurley, MacNamara, O'Grady, O'Gorman, Galvin, Kennedy, MacMahon, McInerney, and Clancy. During the 13th century Richard Strongbow's relatives the Norman de Clares attempted to take Thomond, but the Dál gCais held firm.

It wasn't until the 16th century, unable to be defeated militarily, that they agreed to surrender and regrant their kingdom to Henry VIII Tudor, joining the nobility of the Kingdom of Ireland. Their realm was renamed County Clare, though they remained influential. In later times, remarkable figures include writer Standish James O'Grady, who is called "Father of the Celtic Revival" and William Smith O'Brien who played a leading part in the Young Irelander Rebellion of 1848. In diaspora, prominent figures have included John Galvin (general), Francis George Hassett, The First Chief of the Australian Defence Force, Patrice de Mac-Mahon, President of France, as well as John F. Kennedy and Ronald Reagan, who were both Presidents of the United States.

== History ==
=== Origins, Déisi Muman vs. Deirgtine ===
In their own genealogies, the Dál gCais traced their line back to their eponymous ancestor and progenitor Cormac Cas, who is said to have lived in the 2nd to 3rd century. They make him a second son of Ailill Aulom from the Deirgtine, a King of Munster and Leath Moga more generally, associated in a story with the goddess Áine of the Tuatha Dé Danann during the Cycles of the Kings of Irish mythology. Cormac Cas himself was purported to be the younger brother of Eógan, founder of the Eóganachta, who would go on to rule Munster for many centuries. While this was taken on face value for a long time, later Irish scholars came to question its validity, regarding it as a politically motivated fabrication. The Dál gCais were becoming powerful in the 10th century, with Mahon and his brother Brian Bóruma taking the throne in Munster from the Eóganachta; claiming ancient kinship with their rivals would have boosted their legitimacy.

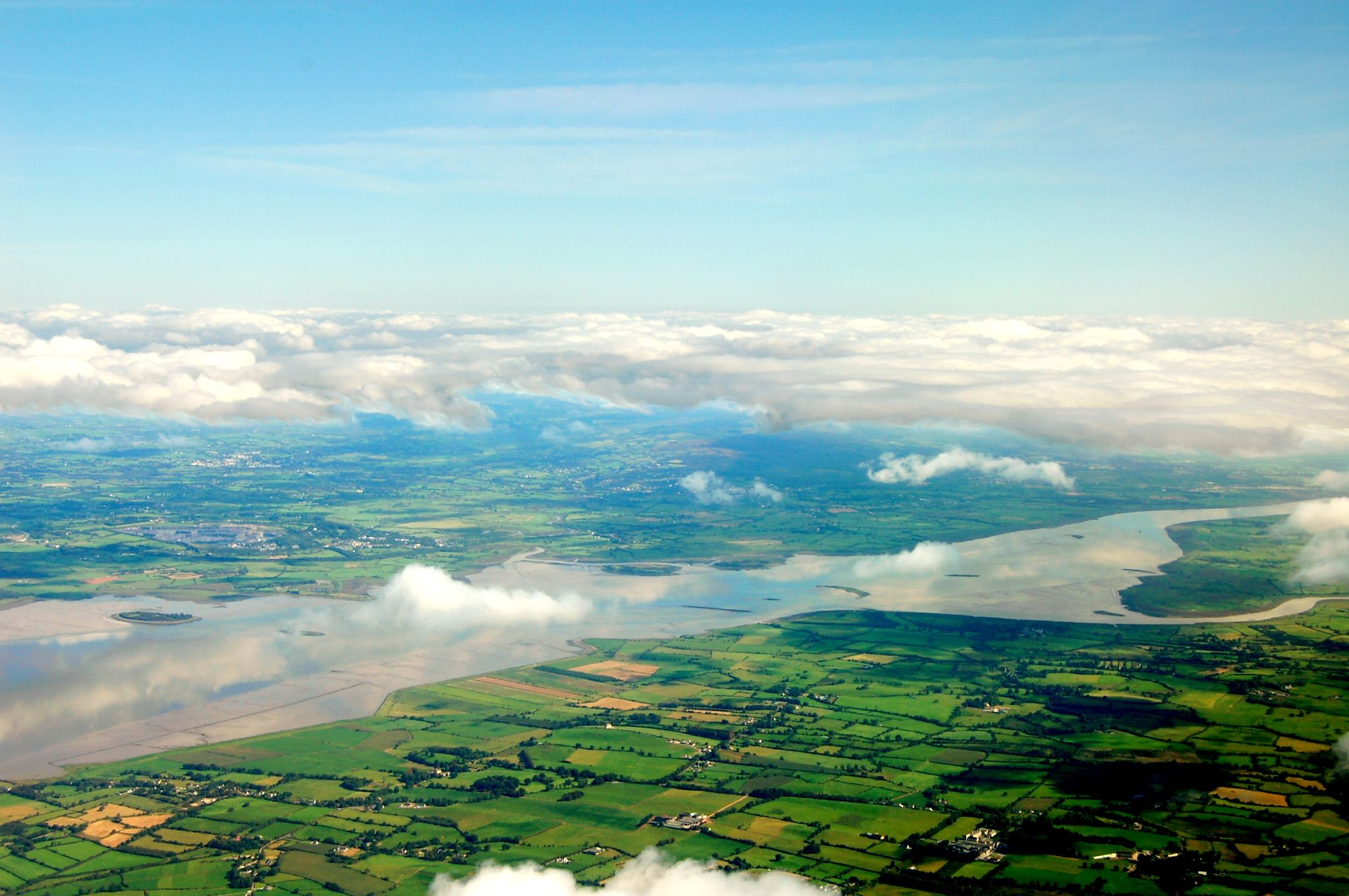
Aerial view of the River Shannon, the area where the Dál gCais grew in power

It is claimed by current scholarship that the Dál gCais were instead a branch of the Déisi Muman. The Déisi Muman held a vassal kingship in Munster under the Eóganachta, significant in scope, consisting of what is today Waterford and its environs. As time went on branches also emerged around the River Shannon, as part of the Déisi Muman moved north-westerly between the 5th and early 8th century; they were called the Déisi Deiscirt and the Déisi Tuisceart. It is from a later, more northerly branch, which the Dál gCais are said to ultimately find their true ancestors. The first recorded mention of their adoption of the new name Dál gCais specifically is in the Annals of Inisfallen for the year 934, which records the death of their king Rebachán mac Mothlai.

The Déisi Muman themselves are the subject of The Expulsion of the Déisi epic in the Cycles of the Kings, which is set during the time that Cormac Ulfada was High King of Ireland. The story describes the expulsion of the Dal Fiachrach Suighe; kinsmen of the Connachta and descendants of Fedlimid Rechtmar; from Tara, coming to settle in Munster after many battles. Upon becoming the Déisi Muman, one branch then sailed across to Britain in the 4th century, coming to rule Dyfed. Their presence in Britain may have been initially supported by Magnus Maximus, Roman Emperor, as part of a policy of backing Gaelic vassals to be seafaring defenders of the shores of Britain facing the Irish Sea from pirates. Eoin MacNeill has pointed out that they were not the only Irish colony in the area, with the Uí Liatháin also powerful. Historian C. Thomas Cairney stated that the Dal gCais along with the Déisi were tribes of the Erainn who were the second wave of Celts to settle in Ireland from about 500 to 100 BC.

=== Ascent to the High Kingship of Ireland ===
The adoption of the name Dál gCais and the ascent of the group to greater power began to take place during the 10th century with internal political transition. With the death of Rebachán mac Mothlai, the leadership of the Déisi Tuisceart shifted from the Uí Aengusa kindred to their junior relatives the Uí Thairdelbaig. It was during the time of Cennétig, who styled himself King of Thomond, that the Dál gCais began to challenge the Eóganachta; though Kennedy was defeated at the Battle of Gort Rotacháin by Cellach Caisil, King of Munster in 944. The actual reason for this sudden surge has been much debated and one frequently discussed thesis is that it was a political scheme of the Uí Néill, intending to use the Dál gCais as proxies to further weaken the power of the Eóganachta.

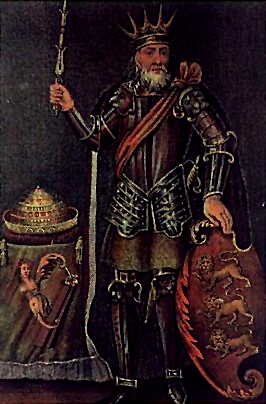
Brian Bóruma, High King of Ireland, perhaps the best-known historical figure of the Dál gCais

Kennedy's children built on their father's achievements. His daughter Órlaith became Queen consort of Ireland, after she married Donagh Donn, a High King of Ireland from the southern branch of the Uí Néill. Mahon became the first Dál gCais to gain the kingship of Munster, after he seized the Rock of Cashel from Molloy of the Eóganachta. Leading up to this he had defeated the Norse under Ivar of Limerick at the Battle of Sulcoit in 968. After Mahon was captured by Donovan in 976 and murdered by Molloy, the Eóganachta returned to the throne at Cashel for two years, but Mahon's younger brother Brian Bóruma, a seasoned military man from the early campaigns, would desire vengeance.

A campaign in 977-78 led to the defeat and death of Ivar, with an engagement at Scattery Island being the most significant. Brian retained the formerly Norse Limerick for its trading power and naval strength. The Dál gCais took back Munster at Belach Lechta the same year, killing Molloy in the process. Ambition saw Brian look next to the territories of Malachy II, High King of Ireland. A closely contested war of 15 years ensued, with the naval ability of the Dál gCais paying off as a truce was called by Malachy in 997, recognising Brian's overlordship of Leath Moga. They became allies against the Norse Dublin and the Laigin who under Máel Mórda, King of Leinster had risen against Brian's claims. The latter were subdued at Glenmama in 999, before rebelling again in 1014 at Clontarf where Norse power in Ireland was finally broken, though Brian died in the process. In the interim, Malachy had passed the High Kingship to Brian in 1002 and he built strong Christian links to Armagh. Historian C. Thomas Cairney stated that the Dal gCais were the axe-wielding foot-soldiers who formed the core of the army that defeated the Vikings in 1014.

After the death of Brian, his two established surviving sons; Donagh and Teague; struggled in an internal Dál gCais rivalry for dominion. While Donagh was High King, many other Irish kings allied against him, including Leinster, Connacht, and Ulster. Deposed in 1063, he fled to Rome, with some sources claiming he granted Pope Urban II the Irish crown, this is controversial, however. (Note: Donagh certainly fled to Rome and was buried at the Basilica di Santo Stefano al Monte Celio. The stories about his time there are recorded by Geoffrey Keating in the 17th century, some with skepticism. The story was used in the 19th century as a potential explanation for Laudabiliter.) Teague's son Turlough took up the reins in a lasting alliance with the powerful Dermot Kinsella, King of Leinster. Not a military leader, Turlough was instead a capable politician, the Cogad Gáedel re Gallaib glorifying Brian's feats would be authored during his lifetime. Turlough's son Murtagh would be the last High King from the Dál gCais of the medieval period, reigning between 1101–19. Murtagh attempted to make the Irish kingship more along the lines of European monarchies and was involved in foreign affairs (allying with Arnulf de Montgomery in the Welsh Marches against Henry I, King of England), trying to extend Irish influence beyond internal rivalries.

== Dynastic divisions ==
=== Septs and kindreds ===
The septs of the Dál gCais developed over time, with new ones breaking off to form separate surnames at different times, but all claiming to share the same paternal line (with a few biological exceptions along the way due to adoption or extra-marital issue). Their eponymous founder Cas had several sons; two of them gave their names to the Uí Bloid and Uí Caisin kindreds, and another founded the Ui Fearmaic. As the proto-Dál gCais moved up into what is today East Clare, these became associated with rooted tribal areas, but were themselves internally divided into any other septs.

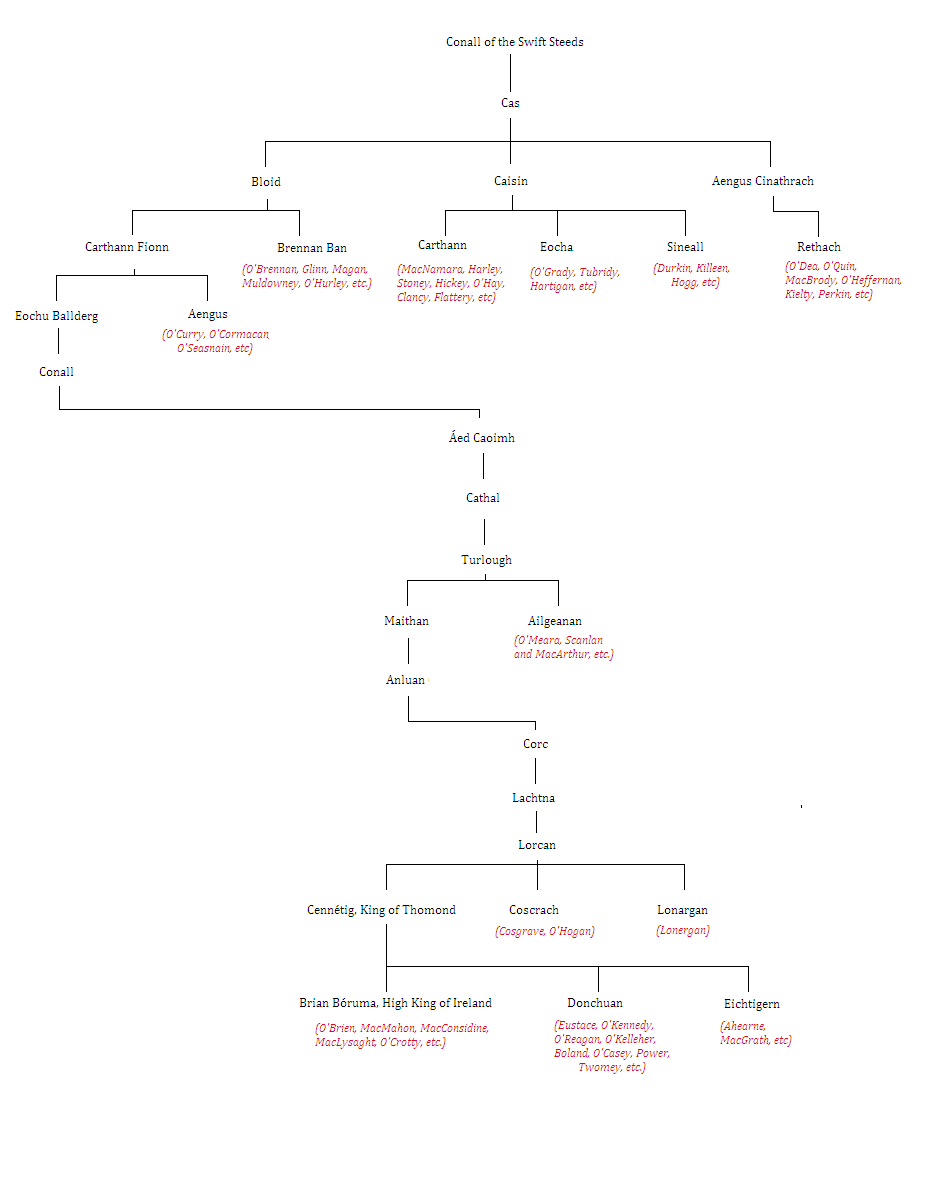
Tree graph showing relationships between the Dalcassian septs. (Note: Most information about the relationship between septs and their genealogical root can be found in John O'Hart's Irish pedigrees; or, The origin and stem of the Irish nation, where he worked from 17th-century genealogists Cú Choigcríche Ó Cléirigh and Dubhaltach Mac Fhirbhisigh, as well as the Annals of the Four Masters.)

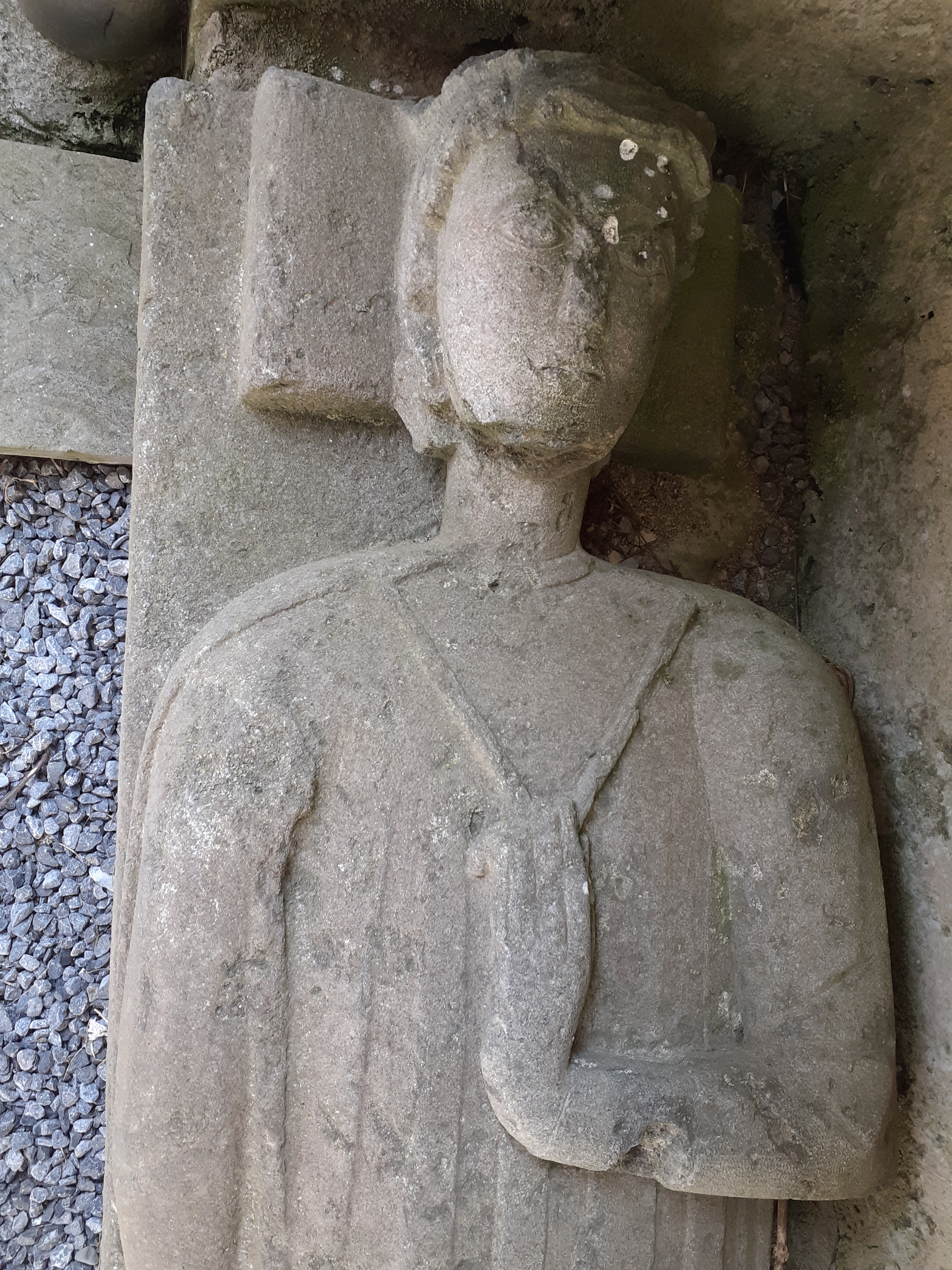
Tomb effigy of the King of Thomond, Conor Roe Ua Briain, in Corcomroe Abbey, where he was buried by the monks after he and his men were killed by Conor Carrach O'Loughlin

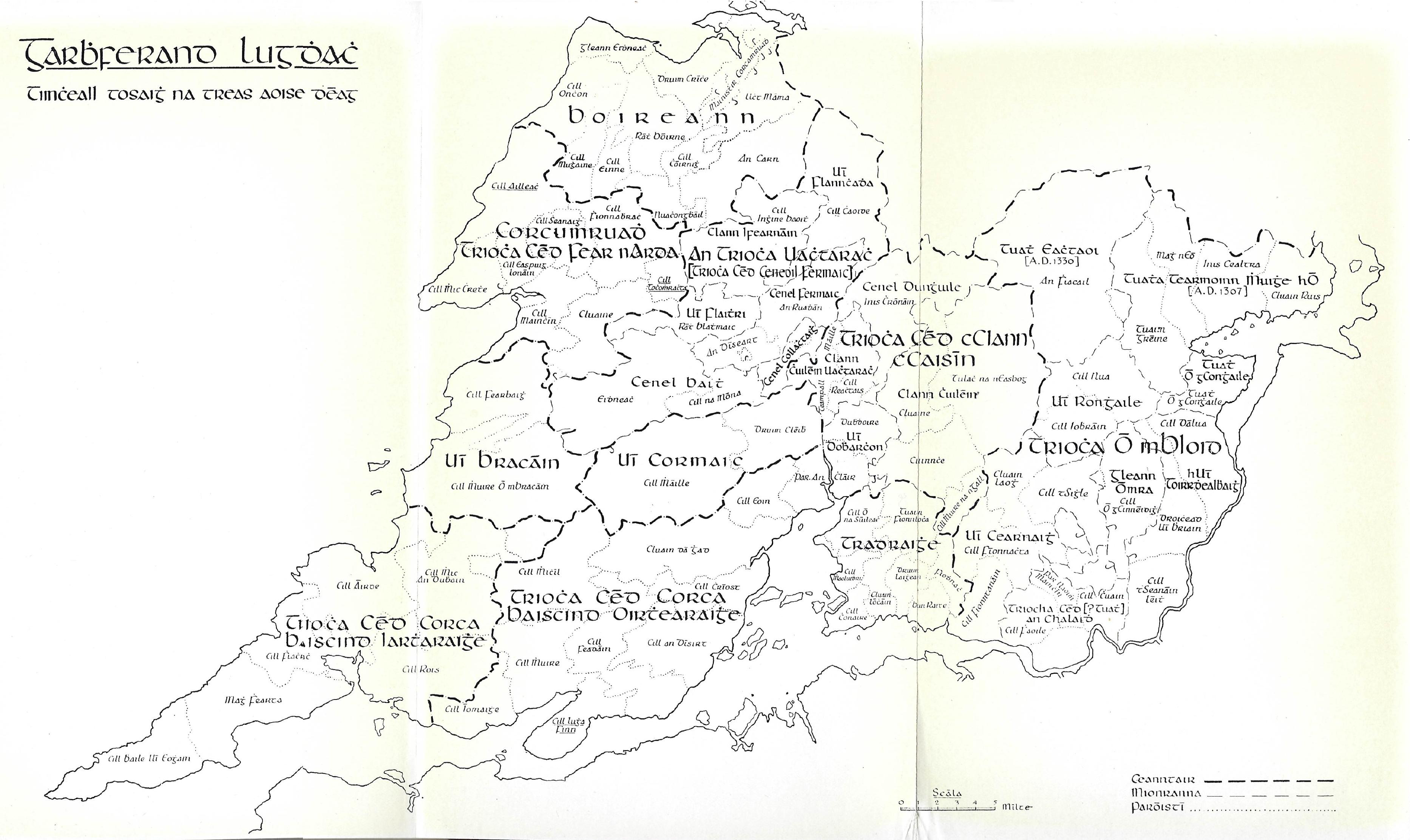
Thomond tribal map 1200AD

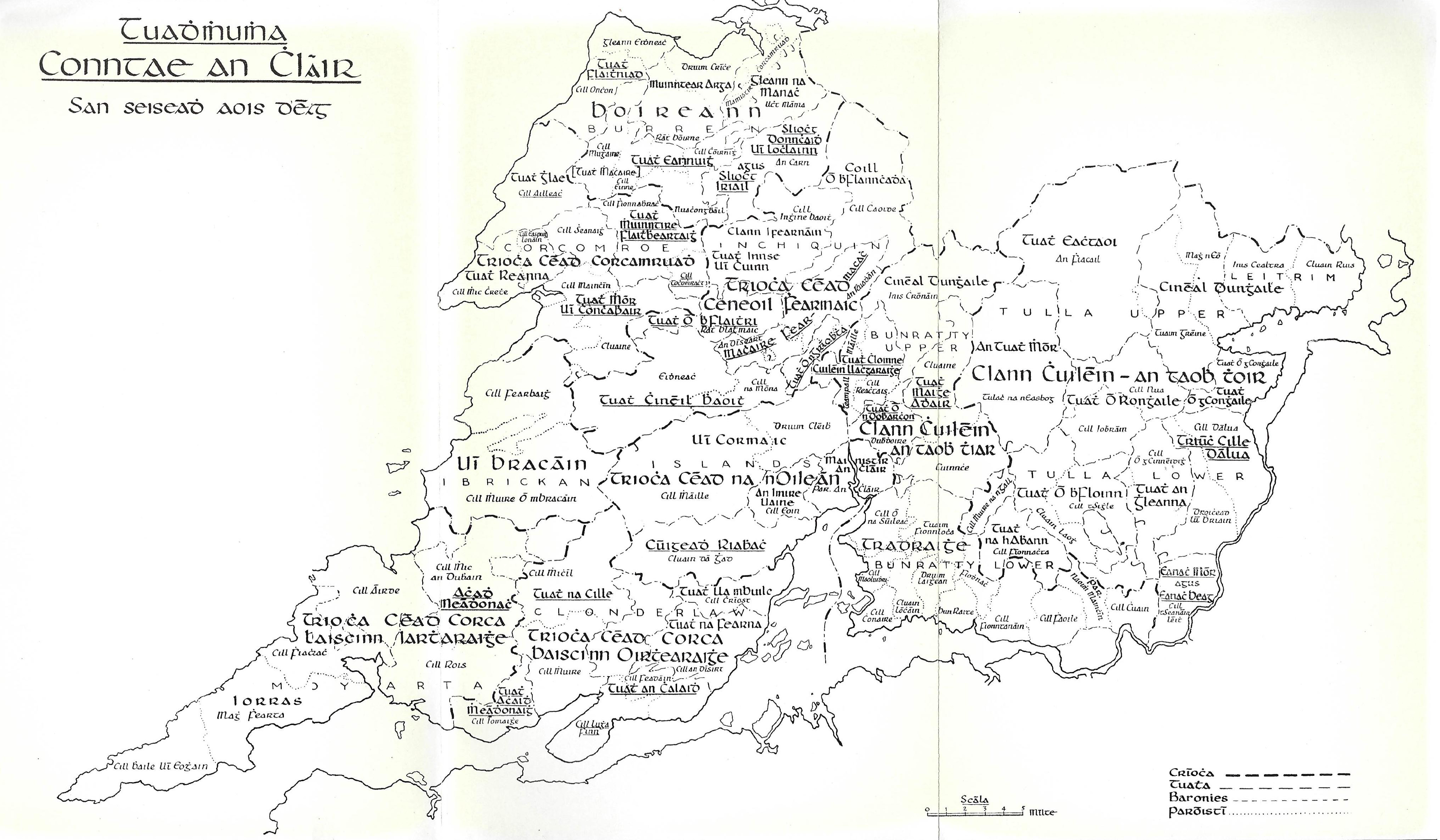
Thomond tribal map 1500AD, note the conquest of Uí mBloid by Clan Cuiléin (Mac Conmara) who now ruled the whole East Clare.

The senior line descended from Cas' first son Bloid and they provided the Kings of Thomond. Initially, the leaders of the tribe were a sept known as the Uí Aengusa from which descends O'Curry, O'Cormacan and O'Seasnain. However, during the 10th century, this passed to the junior Uí Thairdelbaig. It is this kindred which would furnish the High Kings of Ireland and the Kings of Thomond including Brian Bóruma. From the Uí Thairdelbaig came O'Brien, O'Kennedy (who were Kings of Ormond), MacConsidine, MacMahon, O'Reagan, MacLysaght, O'Kelleher, Boland, Cramer, Kearney, O'Casey, Power, Twomey, Eustace, Ahearne, MacGrath, Quick, O'Meara, Scanlan, MacArthur, Cosgrave, O'Hogan, Lonergan and others. O'Noonan and Coombe are other notable Uí Bloid descendants. A younger brother of Carthann Fionn (who both the Uí Thairdelbaig and Uí Aengusa derive) named Brennan Ban stands at the head of the genealogies for the O'Brennan, Glinn, Muldowney and O'Hurley septs.

Although a junior line, the Uí Caisin continued to have a prominent role and the leader of their kindred in Thomond were the MacNamara, who as Lords of Clancullen, were the second most powerful family after the O'Brien. Other families descended from the branch of Carthann (son of Caisin) include Harley, Flood, Torrens, Stoney, Hickey, O'Hay, Clancy, Neylon and Flattery. Carthann had brothers named Eocha and Sineall from whom descend the O'Grady, Tubridy, Hartigan, Durkin, Killeen and Hogg. In addition to this, there are the Ui Fearmaic who claim to descend from Aengus Cinathrach, a brother of Caisin and Bloid. This kindred included the O'Dea as leaders, as well as the O'Quin, O'Griffin / O'Griffey (chieftains of Cineal Cuallachta), O'Heffernan, Kielty and Perkin.

=== Titles and social roles ===
Within the traditional Gaelic culture of Ireland, society rested on the pillars of the tribal nobility, bardic poet historians and priests. Different families had different roles to play and in many cases, this was a hereditary role. However, the nature of this system, known as tanistry was aristocratic ("rule by the best") in the truest sense, in that if the tribe thought a younger male member of the family was more suitable to succeed to a role than an older sibling, then they could. The Norman and wider European concept of strict primogeniture was not completely adopted until after some of the families joined the peerage of Ireland.

The most powerful Dalcassian family of the hereditary Gaelic nobility were the O'Brien (Kings of Thomond), followed by MacNamara (Lords of Clann Cuilean), O'Kennedy (Kings of Ormond), MacMahon (Lords of Corca Baiscinn), O'Grady (Lords of Cinél Dongaile) and O'Dea (Lords of Ui Fearmaic). Some of these families later joined the peerage of Ireland after the surrender and regrant to the Tudors during the 16th century. The O'Brien was initially Earls of Thomond, but later became Barons Inchiquin which they hold to this day. The O'Grady was Viscounts Guillamore, while the O'Quins became Earls of Dunraven. A branch of the MacMahon family became Marquis de MacMahon d'Eguilly in the Kingdom of France, later raised to Dukes of Magenta under Emperor Napoleon III.

The Clancy sept was the hereditary Brehons of Thomond and held a very powerful position when it came to the law in the kingdom. Even after the end of the Gaelic order, they continued to play a role, providing a High Sheriff of Clare in the form of Boetius Clancy. Famously participating in the Contention of the Bards in support of the honour of the tribe, the MacBrody sept were the principal poets and historians of the Dál gCais for centuries. The O'Hickey and Neylon sept would serve as hereditary physicians to the Dalcassians of Thomond. After the Norman Butler dynasty took Ormond, the Dalcassian sept of O'Meara became their hereditary physicians, this line included Barry Edward O'Meara, who was with Emperor Napoleon I in exile at St. Helena.

=== Chieftainship ===
What became known as the Dál gCais stemmed from the Deisi Becc (Small Deisi) who controlled a narrow strip of land stretching from the Ballyhoura mountains to the Shannon and were divided into the Deisi Deiscirt (Southern Deisi, centred around Bruree) and Deisi Tuaiscirt (Northern Deisi, centred around Cahernarry) who shared a common ancestry. Their conquest of modern Clare probably occurred after the Battle of Carn Feradaig in 629AD where, under their king Díoma mac Rónáin, they defeated the King of Connacht Guaire Aidne mac Colmáin who was invading Munster. After this, their Kings first appear in contemporary records. Andelait, son of Díoma is one of eight Munster kings listed as guarantors of the Cáin Adomnáin in 697. In 713 the Deisi Tuaiscirt killed the King of Cashel Cormac mac Ailello in battle at Carn Feradaig after he had invaded their territories. In 744 the annals note: "Destruction of Corco Mruad by the Déis" which indicates their power in Thomond was growing. In 765 the death of their king Torpaid is noted in the annals. From this point forward the annals are silent on the Deisi Tuaiscirt until 934.

In 934 the annals report the death of Reabacán mac Mothla who is described as King of the Dál gCais (the earliest extant usage of this dynastic name) and Abbot of Tuaim Gréine and in the same year his son was killed by one of the sons of Lorcáin mac Lachtna (who is said to succeed Rebeacán as king), the annals report "Duibhghiolla, son of Robacáin, Lord of Ua Corbmaic, was murdered by Congalach son of Lorcáin in treachery". This action must have paved the way for Lorcán and his sons to seize power. Lorcán was descended from the Uí Toirdhealbhach instead of the Uí Oengusso who had hitherto comprised the Deisi Tuaiscirt kings. Cinnéidigh, another son of Lorcáin, who became king after his father, expanded the power of the Dál gCais greatly and was noted as King of Thomond in the annals by his death. His son Mathgamain built on his achievements, capturing Cashel and becoming King of Munster. The best-known member of this dynasty, Brian Boru, took over after his brother Mathgamain's death, reclaimed the Munster kingship and eventually succeeded in establishing himself as High King of Ireland before his famous death in the Battle of Clontarf.

The Dál gCais under Brian's descendants, the Ua Briain would provide a further three High Kings of Ireland and exercised supremacy in Munster until Tairrdelbach Ua Conchobair, taking advantage of war between brothers Diarmait and former High-King Muircheartach, invaded Munster and split it in two in the Treaty of Glanmire (1118) granting Thomond to the sons of Diarmait Ua Briain and Desmond to the leading sept of the dispossessed Eoganacht, the Mac Cárthaigh dynasty. After the death of Domnall Mór Ua Briain, a claimant to the Kingship of Munster, they further retreated beyond the Shannon into the area of modern County Clare in the wake of the Norman Invasion. In 1276 King Edward II granted all of Thomond to Thomas de Clare, taking advantage of the feuding between Clann Taidhg and Clann Briain (whom de Clare supported). The de Clares failed in conquering Thomond and were decisively defeated in the Battle of Dysert O'Dea in 1318, thus the Kingdom of Thomond remained outside of foreign control for a further 200 years.

In 1543 Murchadh Carrach Ó Briain, agreed to surrender his Gaelic Royalty to King Henry VIII and accepted the titles Earl of Thomond and Baron Inchiquin. At his death in 1551, the Earldom passed to his nephew Donough by special remainder and the title Baron Inchiquin passed to his male heirs through his son Dermot. The Earldom went extinct at the death of Henry O'Brien, 8th Earl of Thomond, the next heir would have been a descendant of Daniel O'Brien, 3rd Viscount Clare who was attainded in 1691, so the title became forfeit. However, Charles O'Brien, 6th Viscount Clare, a Jacobite exile used the title Earl of Thomond, as did his son, who died childless in 1774. At the death of James O'Brien, 3rd Marquess of Thomond, the title Baron Inchiquin passed to a distant cousin and descendant of Murrough, Sir Lucius O'Brien, 5th Baronet and was passed down to his descendants.

This early list of Dál gCais Kings is supplied in An Leabhar Muimhneach.

Key:

- = King of Northern Deisi
- = King of Thomond
- = Baron Inchiquin
- = Viscount Clare
- = Earl of Thomond, Earl of Inchiquin
- = Marquess of Thomond

A higher Kingship title which is mutually inclusive with a lower one within the dynasty are not given overlapping dates for the simplicity of the chart.

List of Kings (and later heads) of the Dál gCais

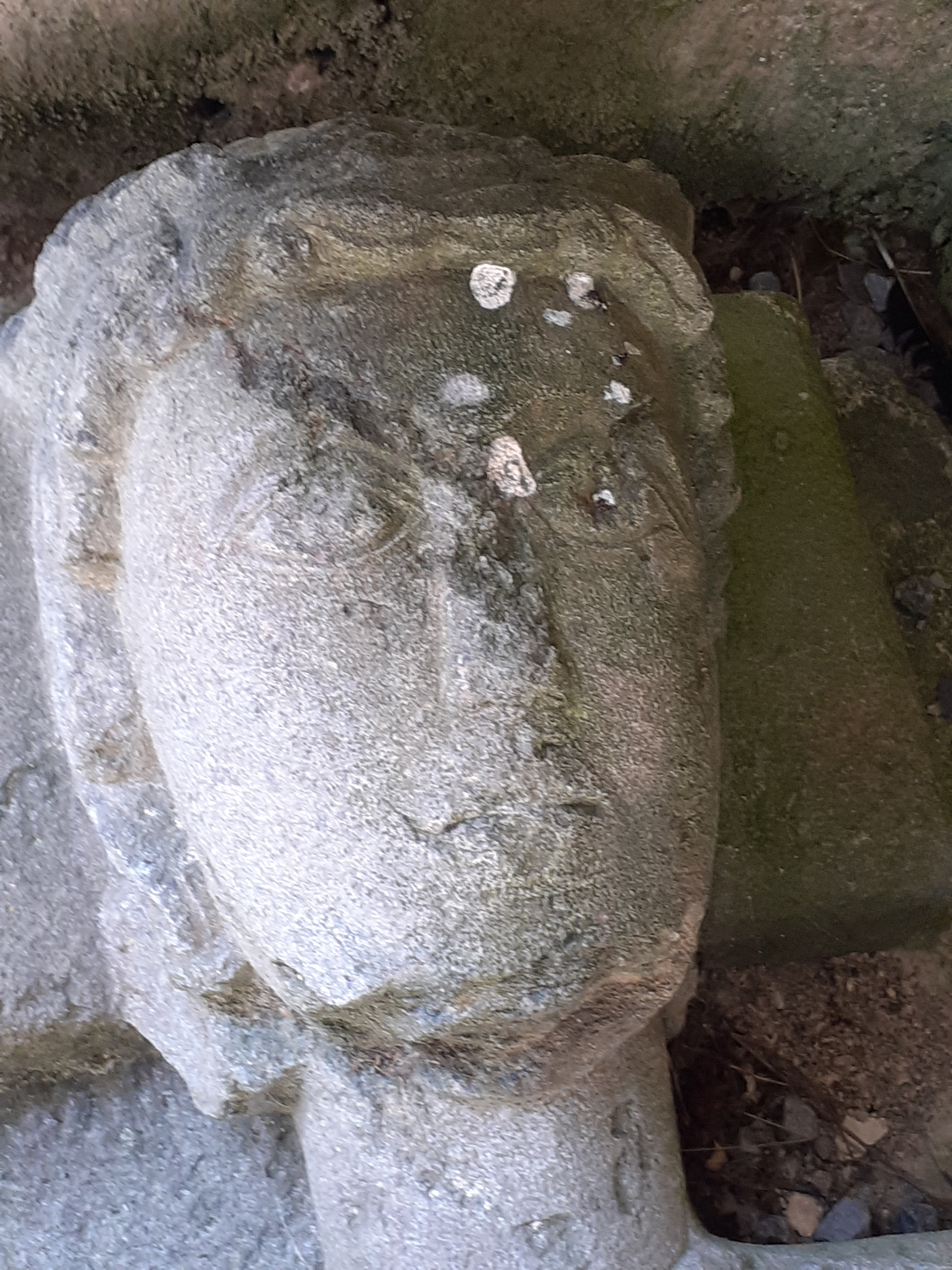
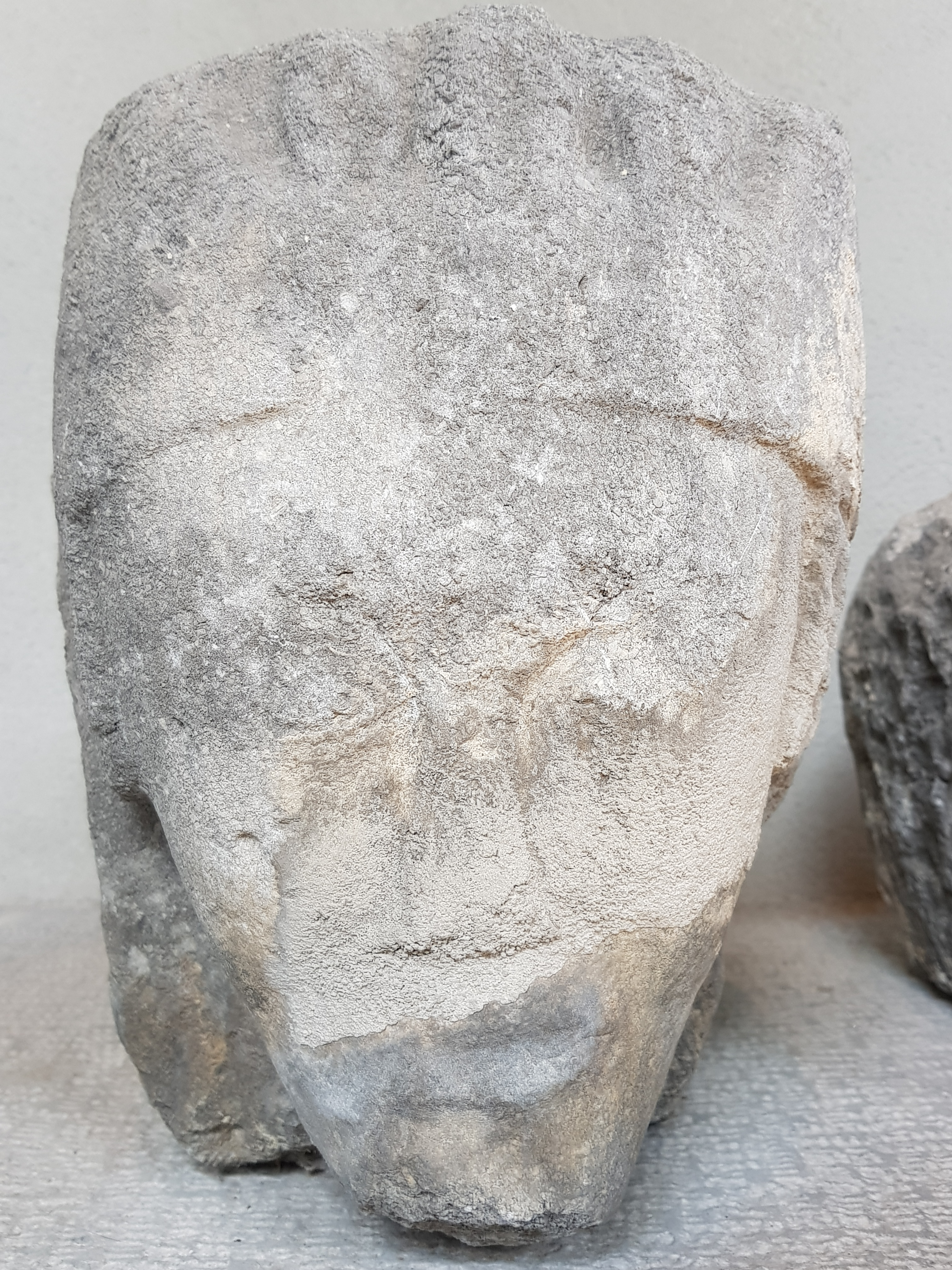
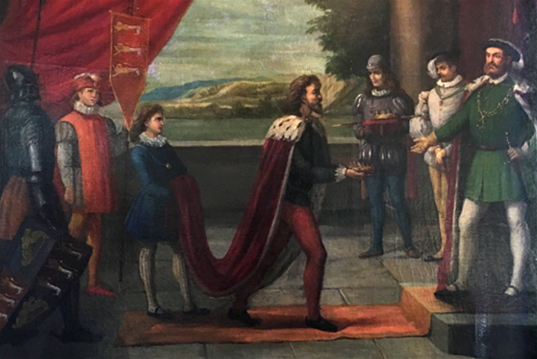
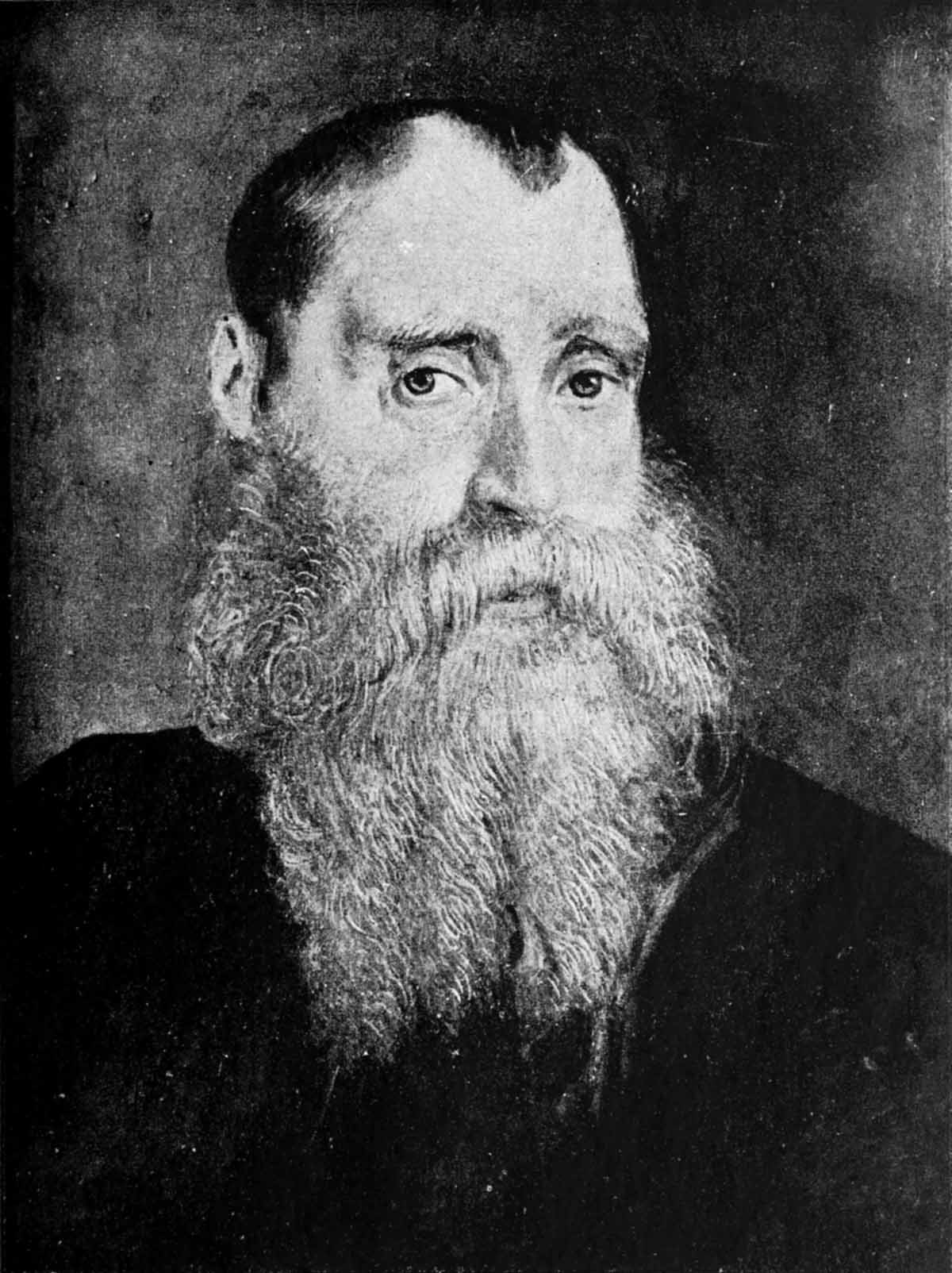
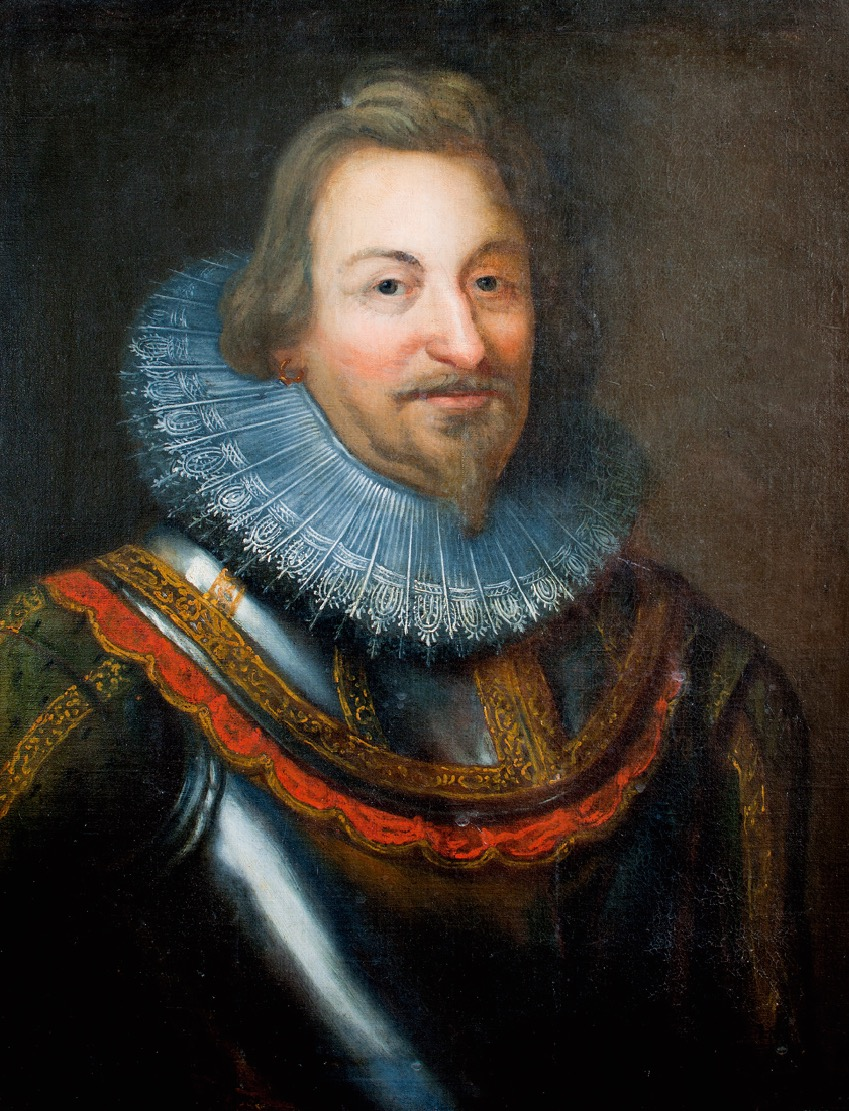
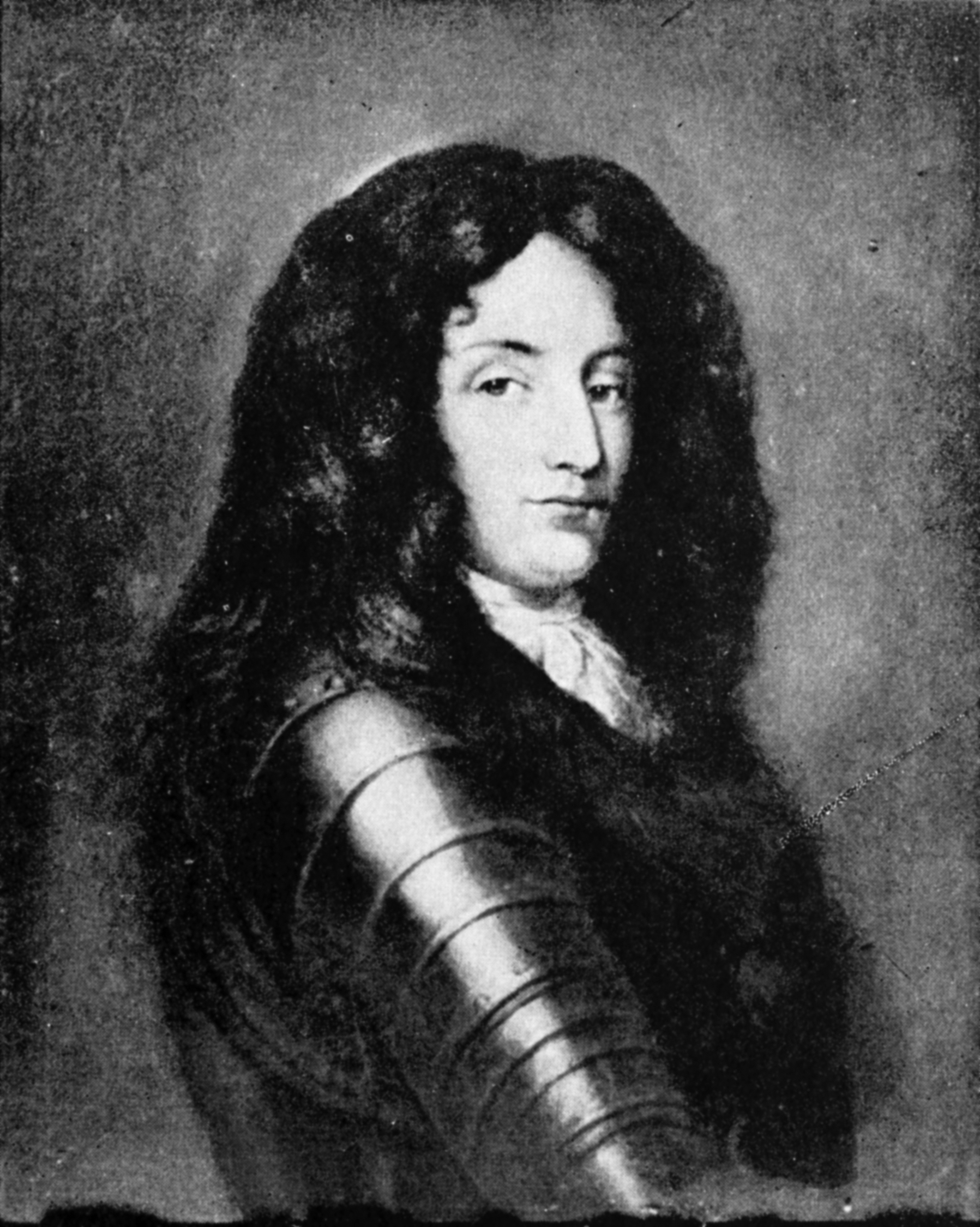
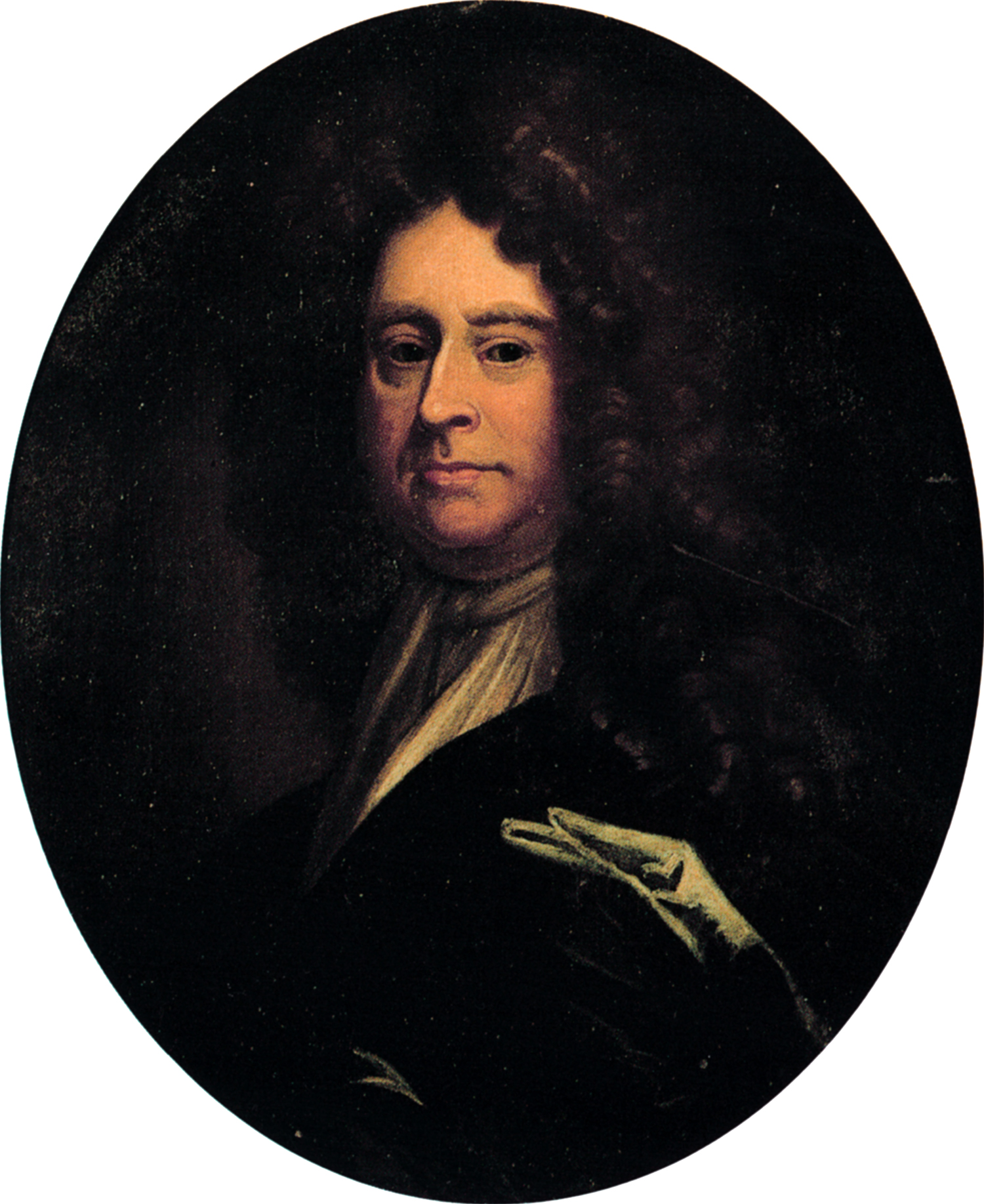
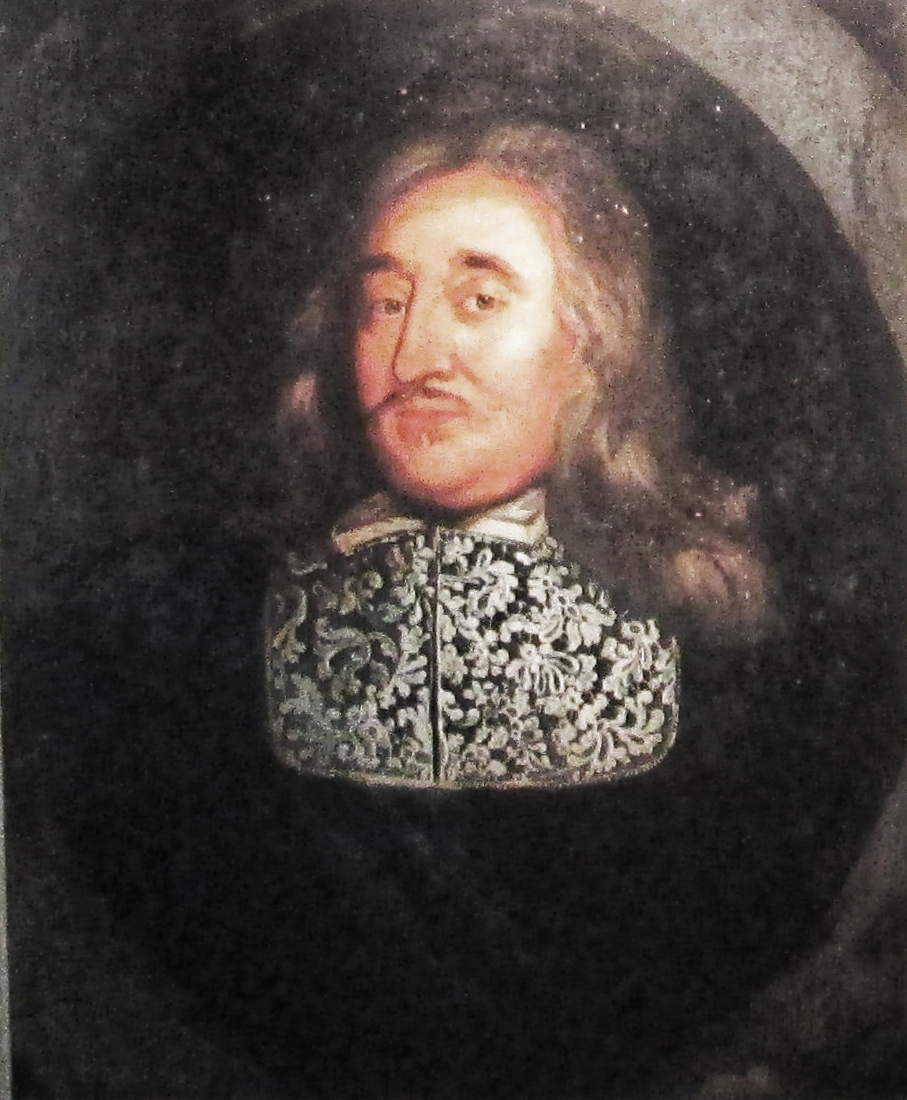
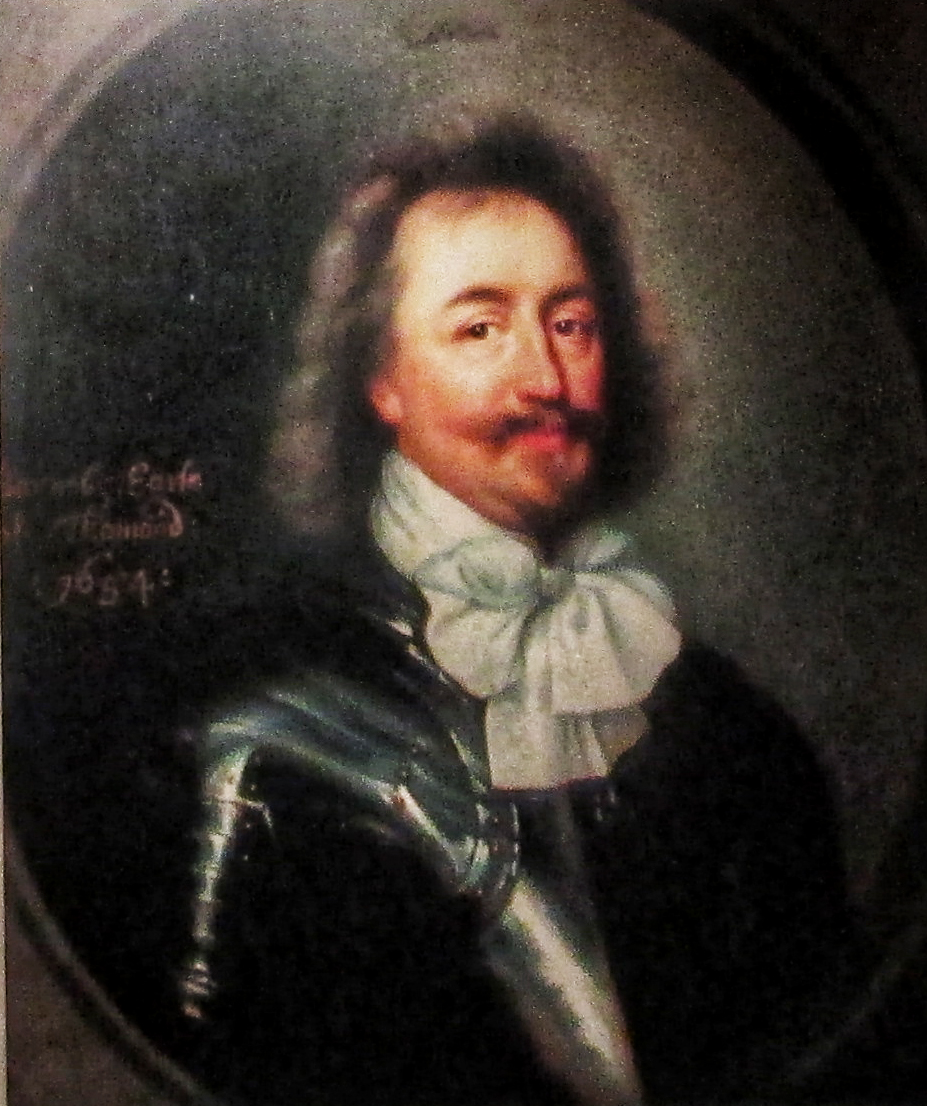
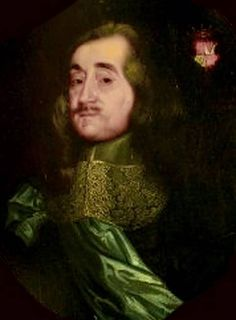
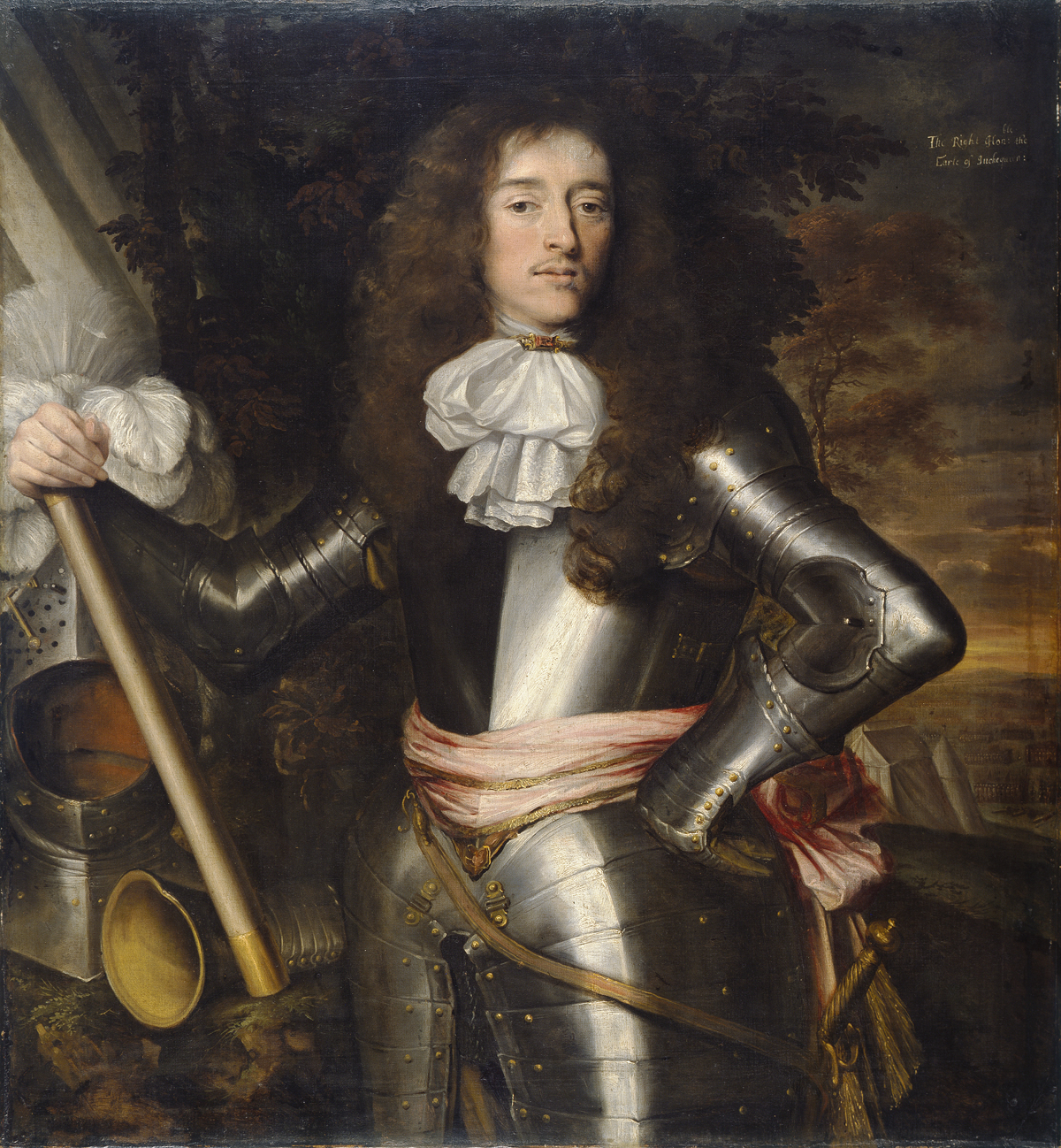
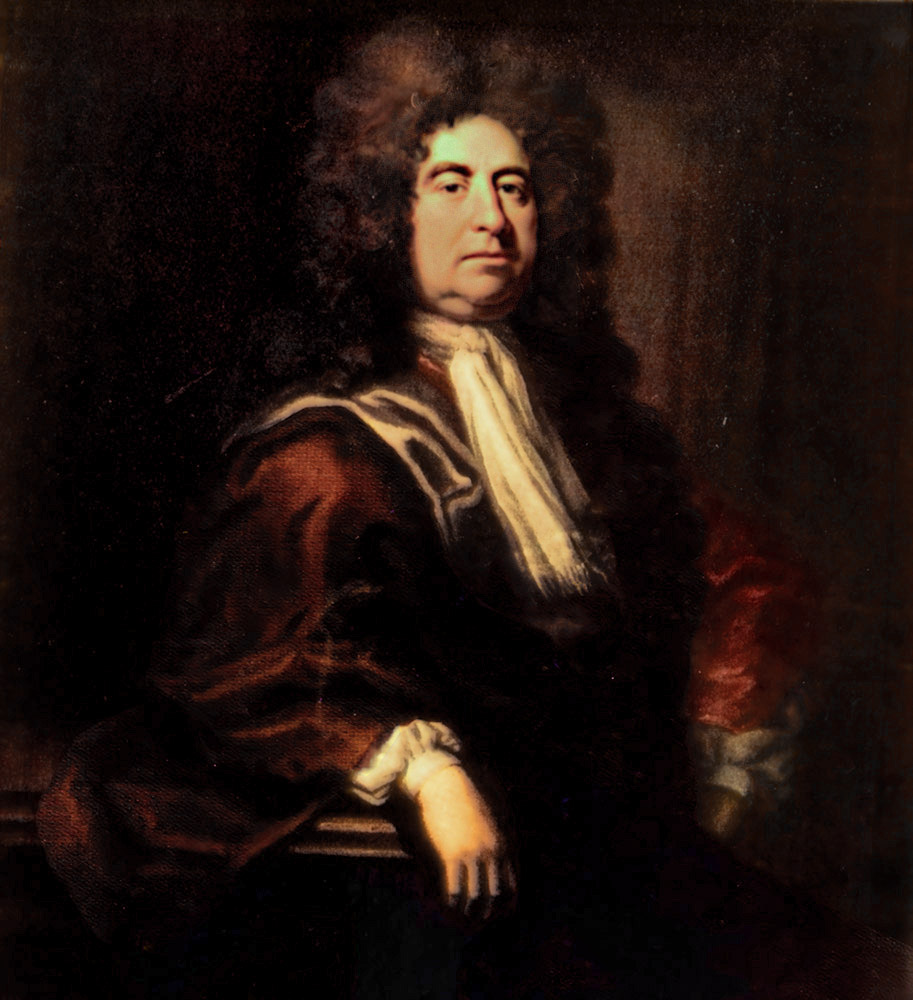
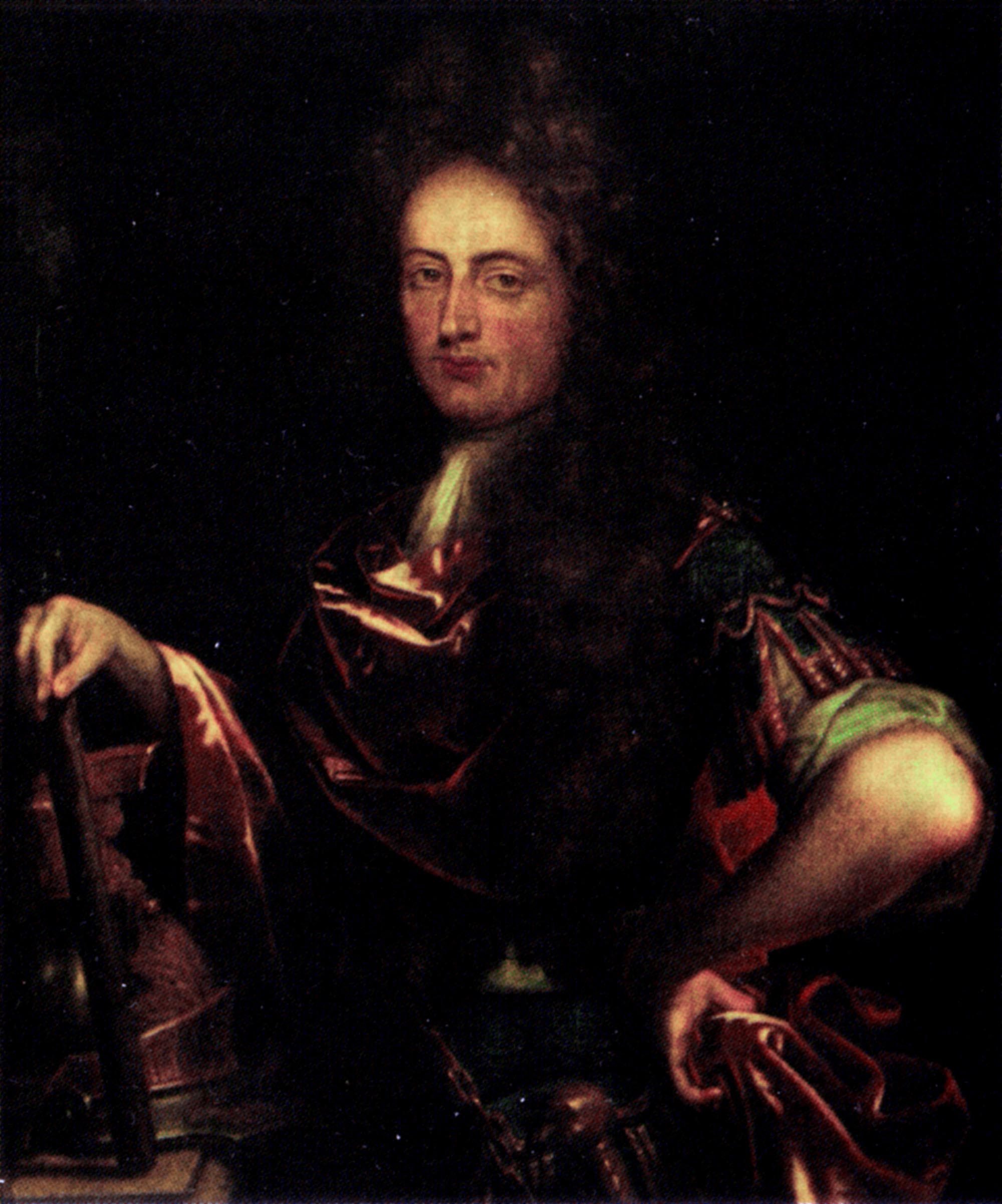
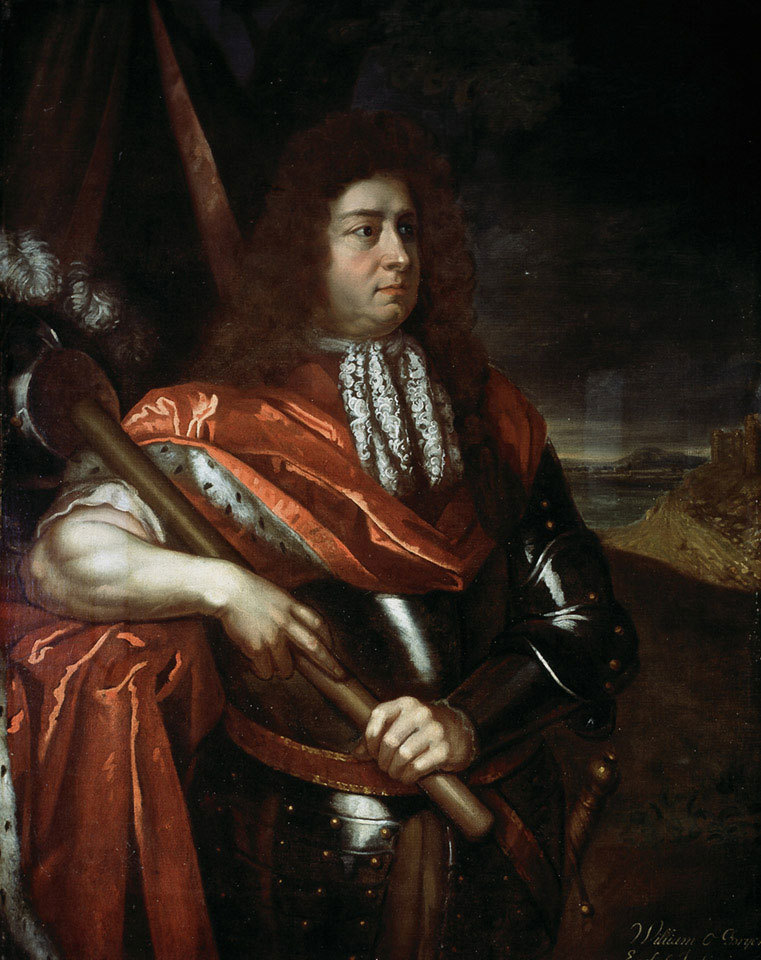
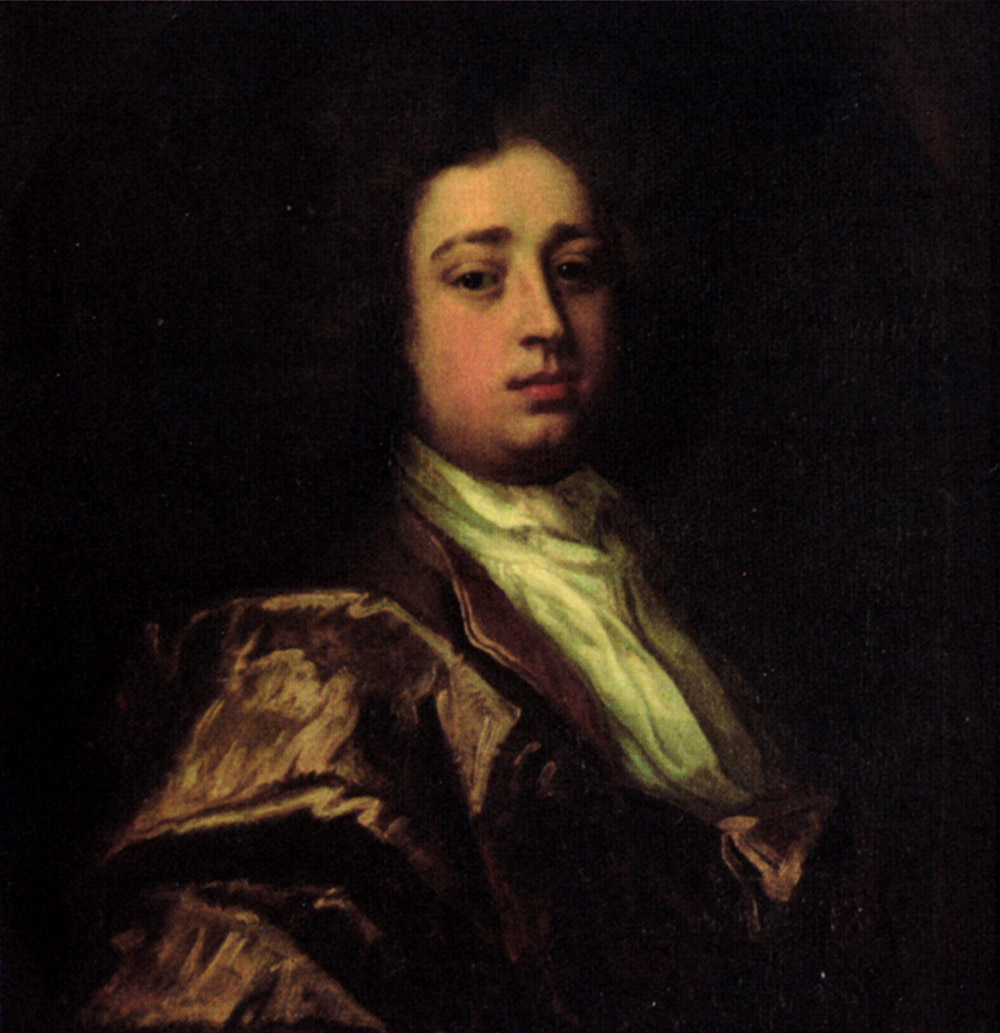
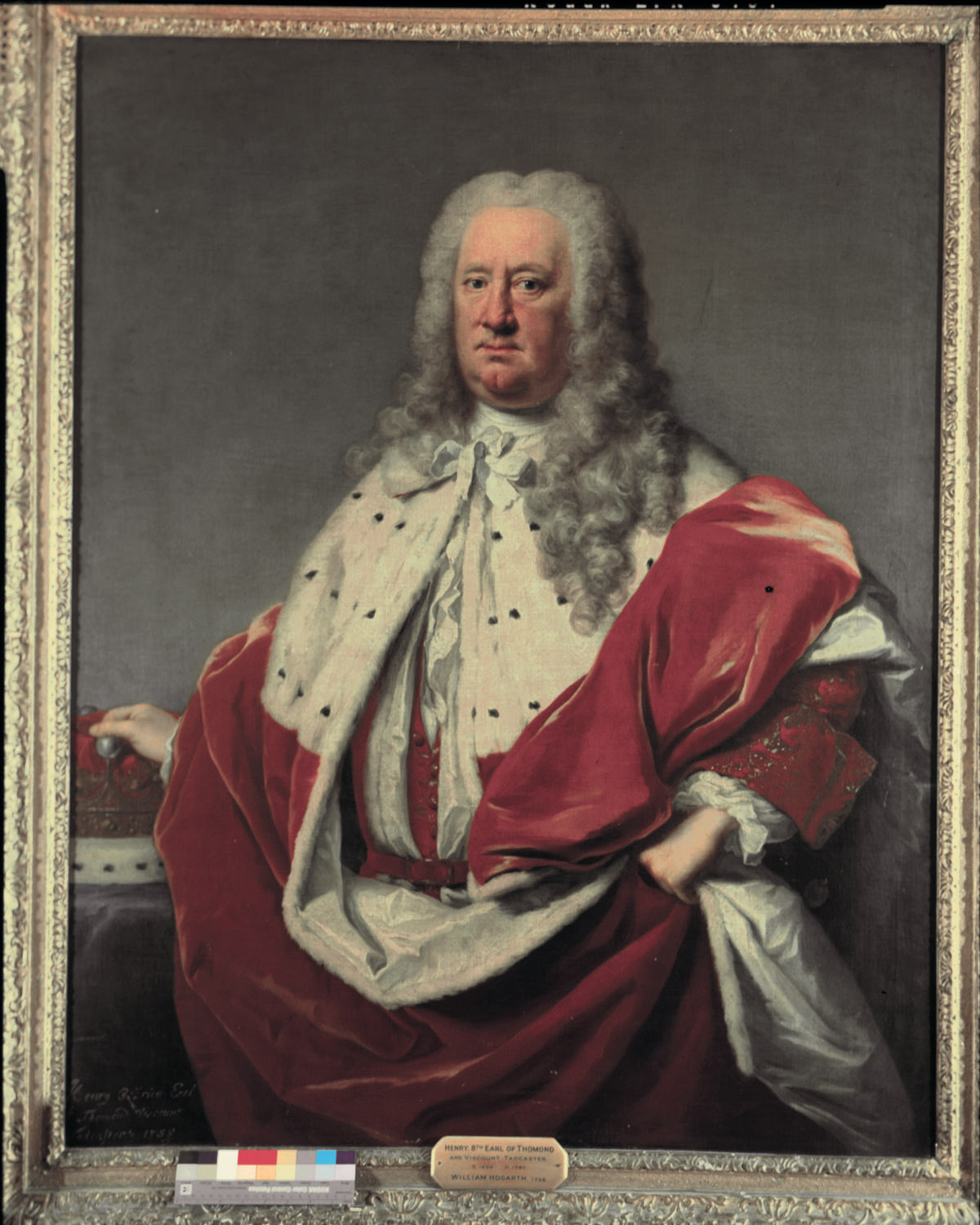
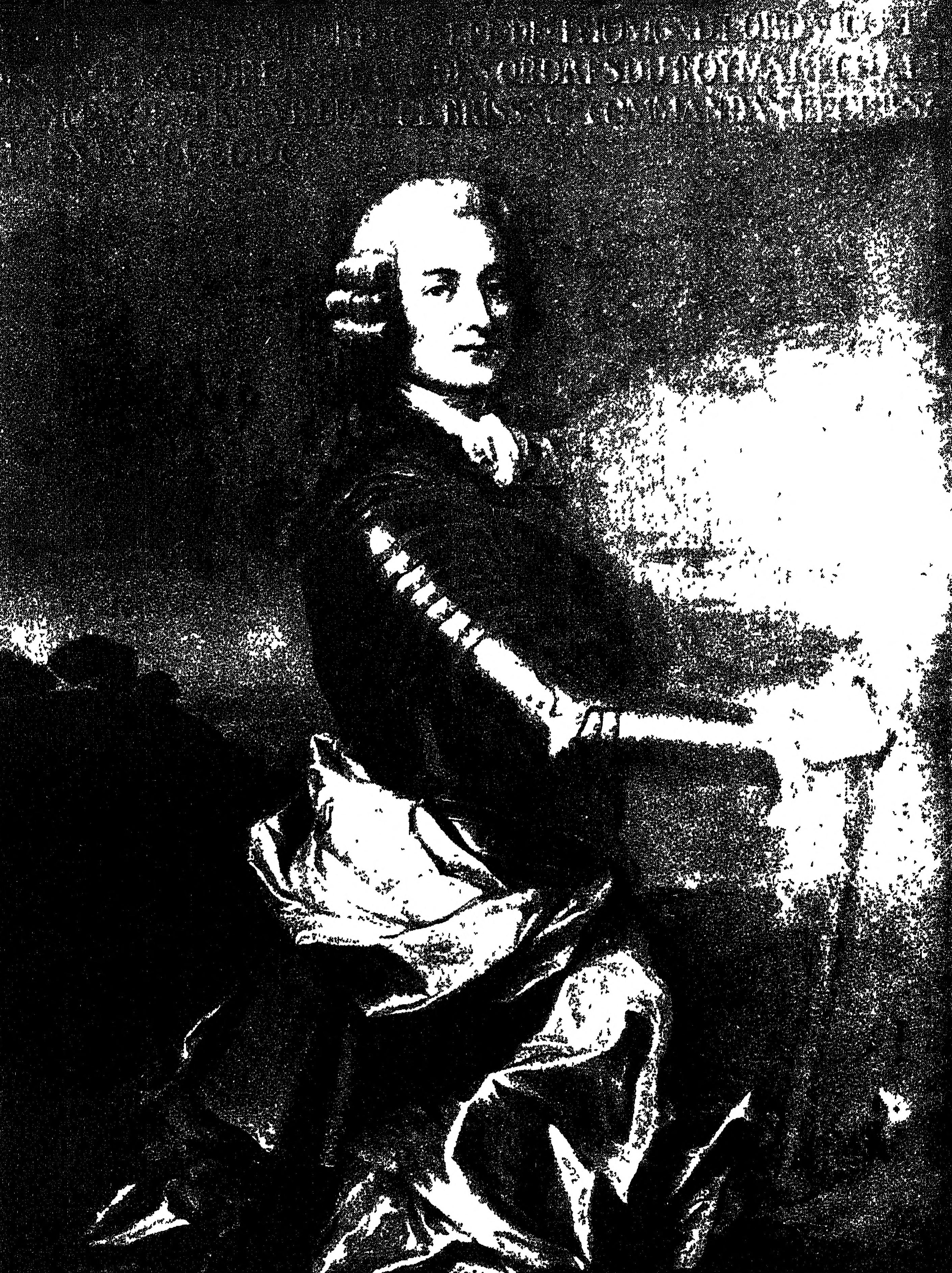
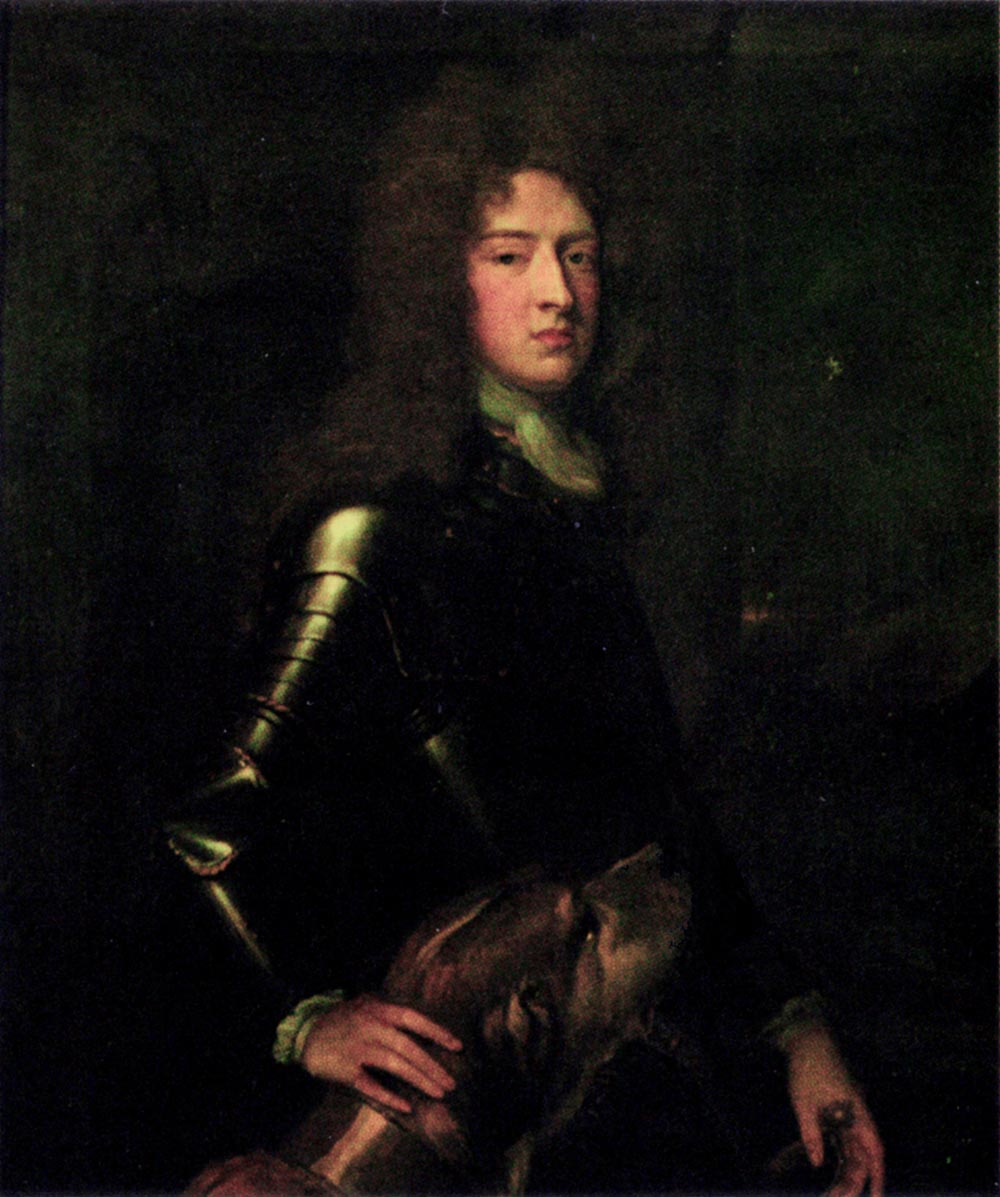
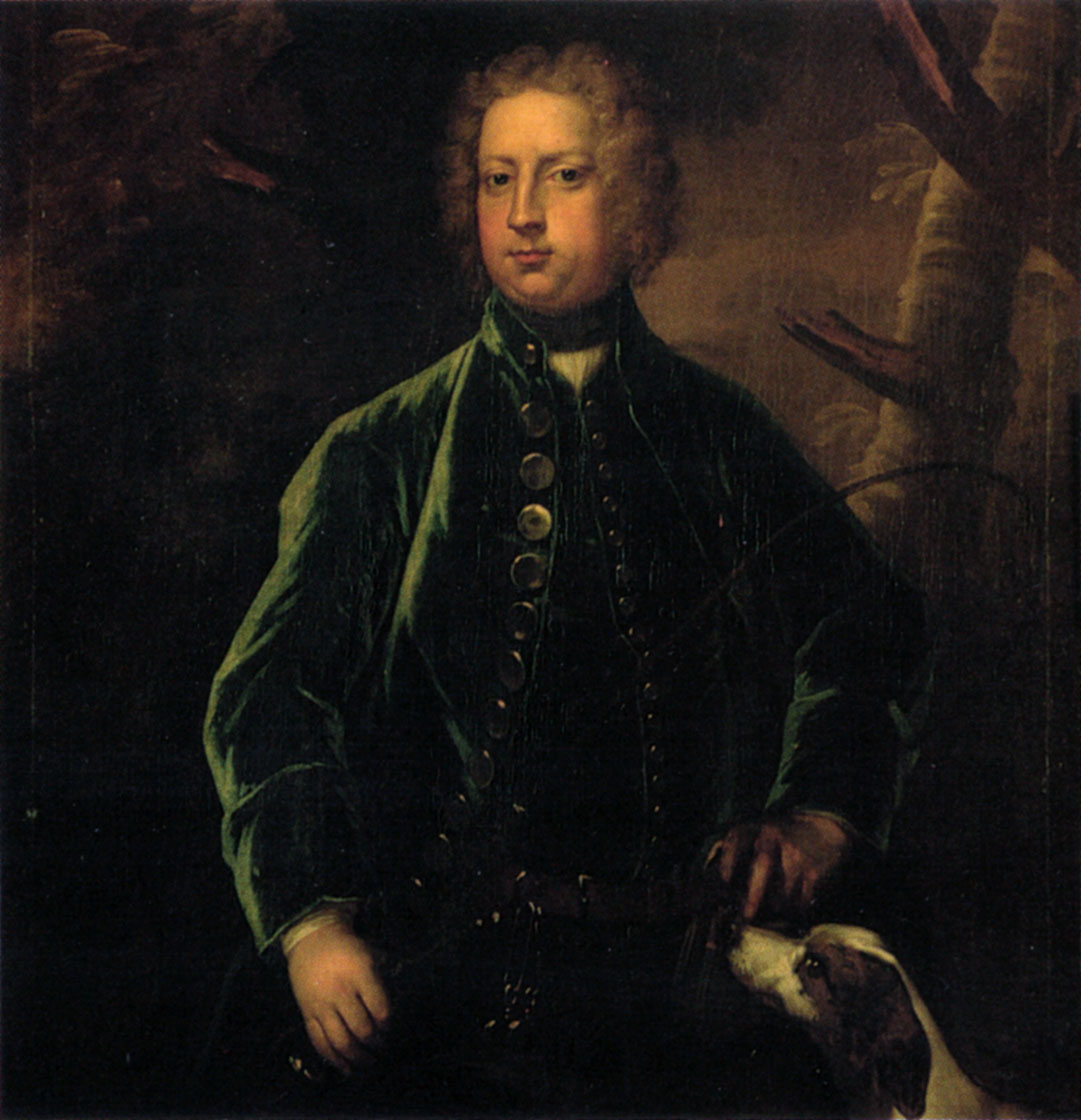
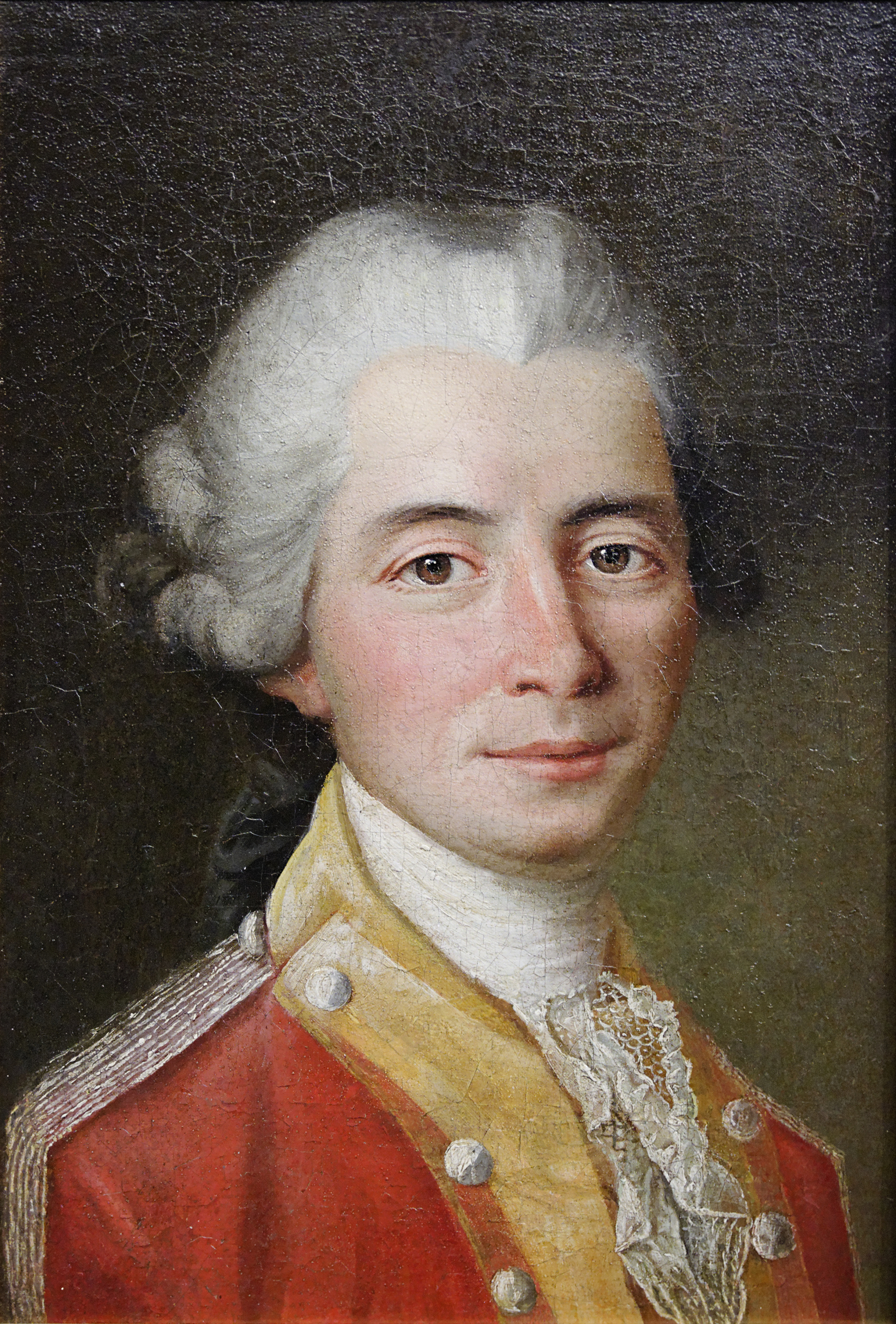
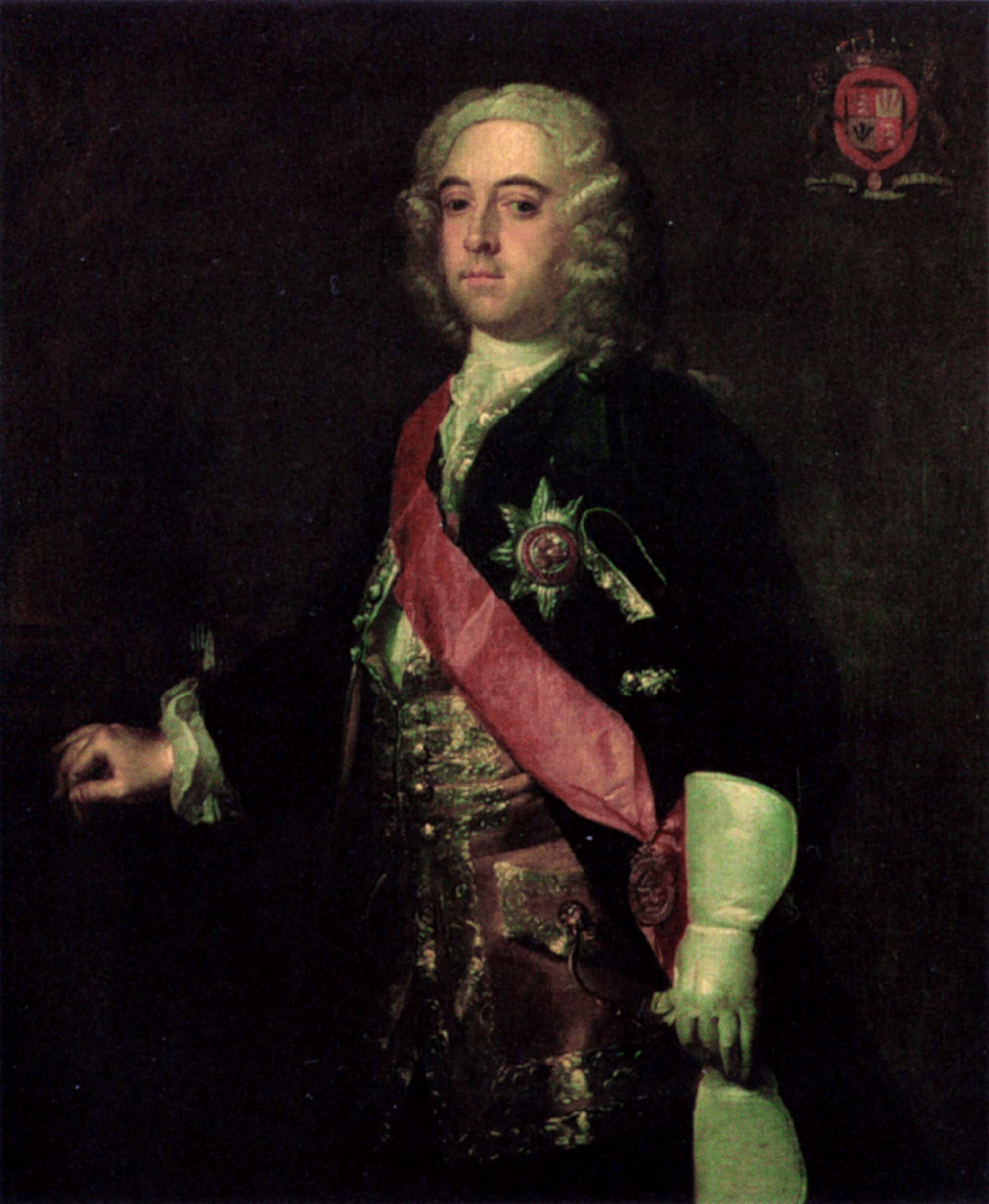
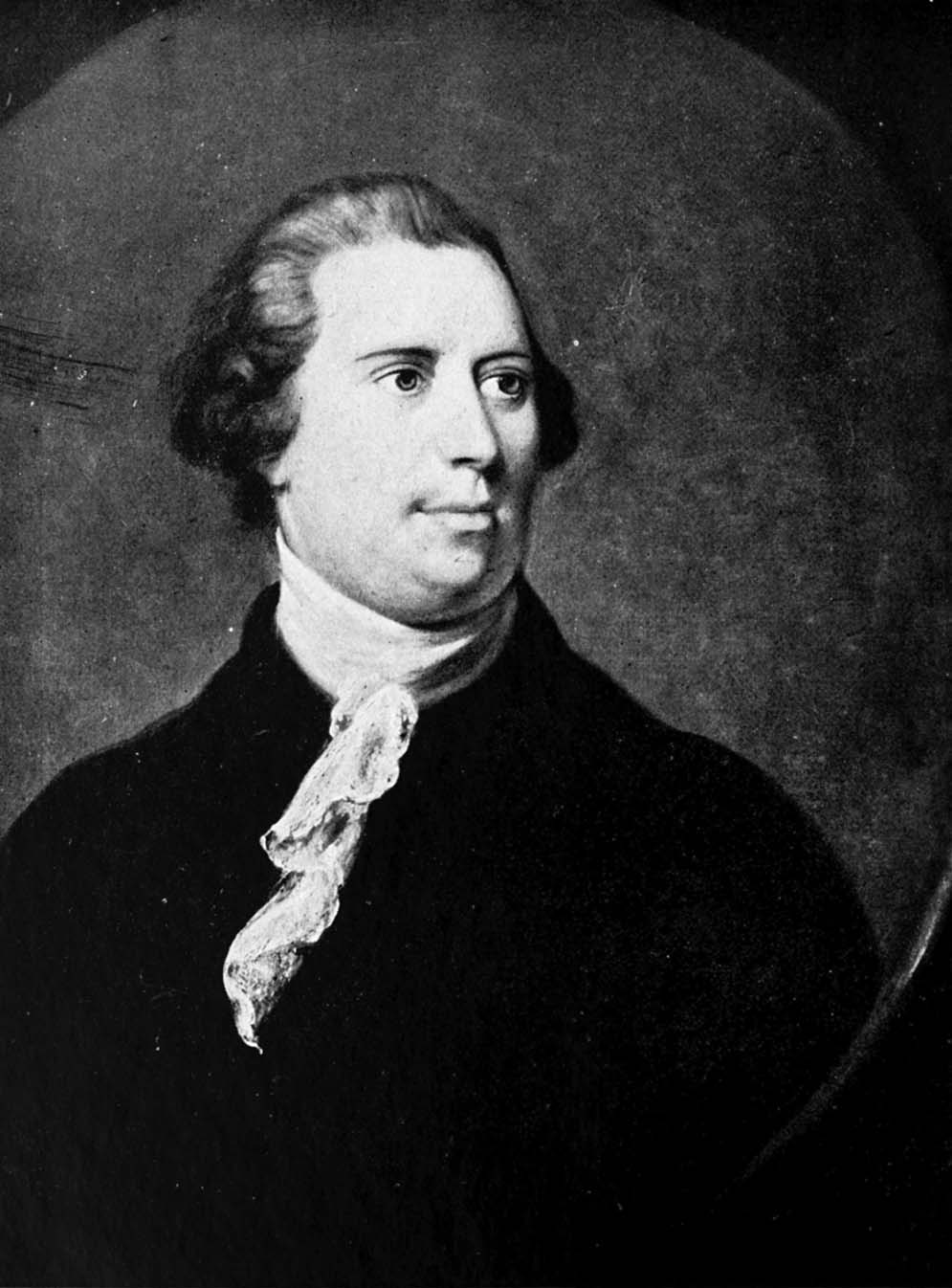
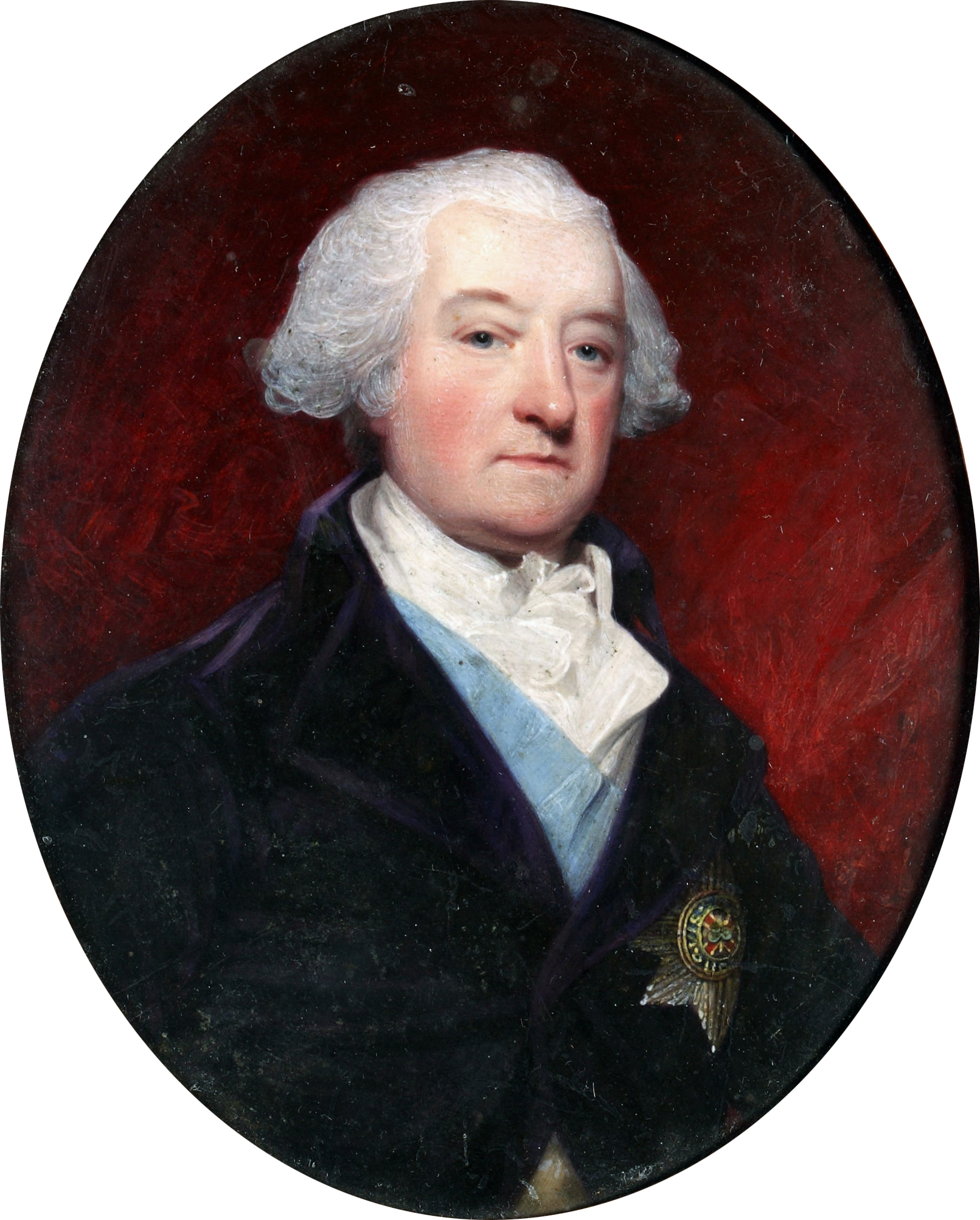
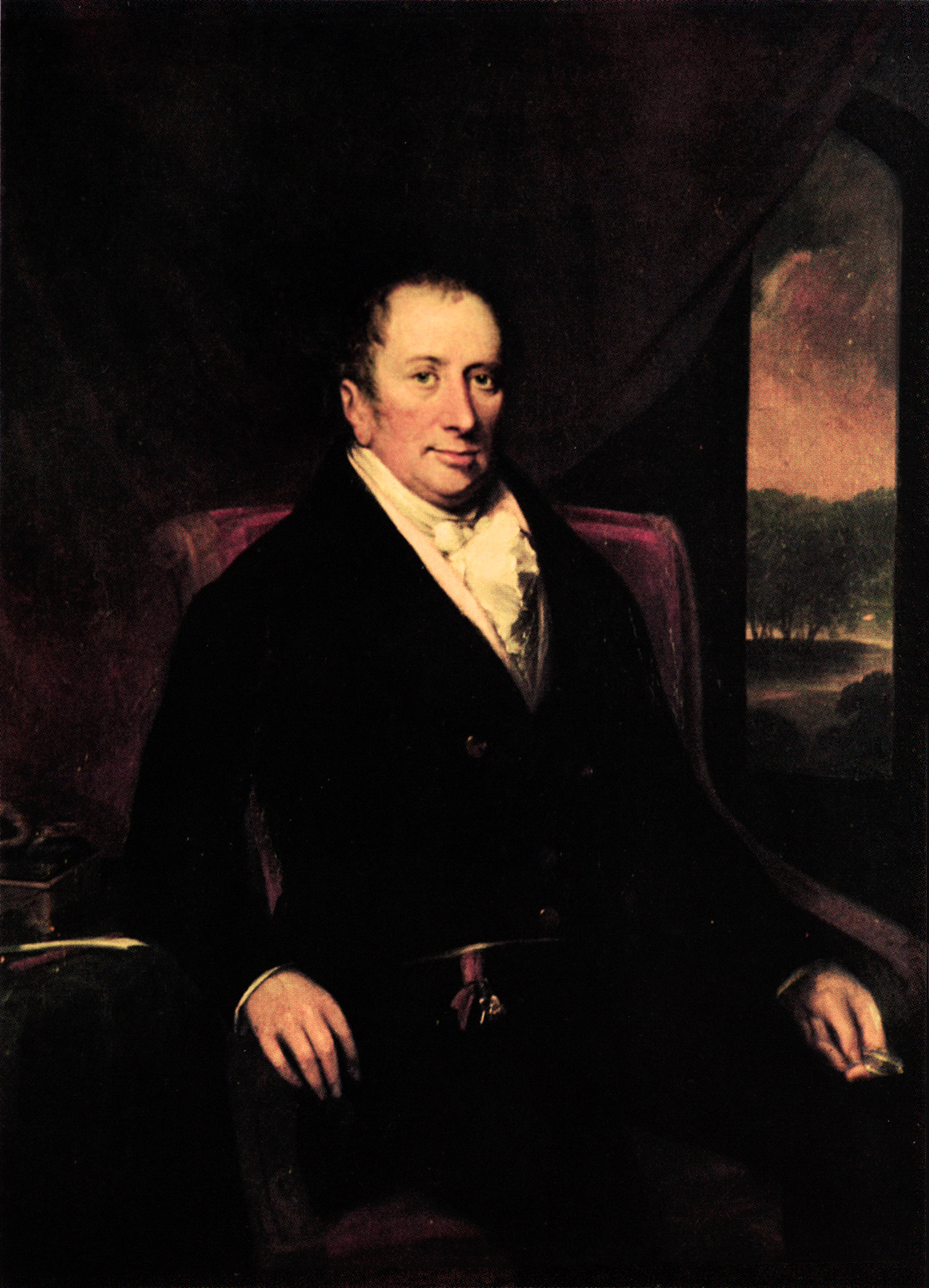
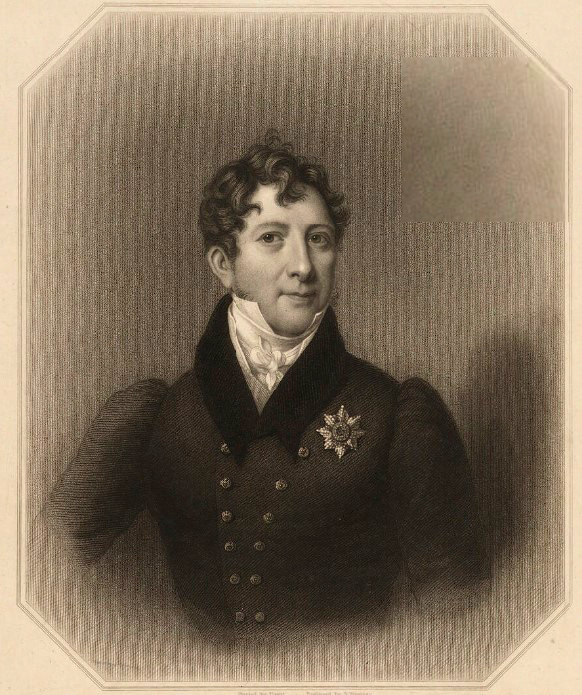
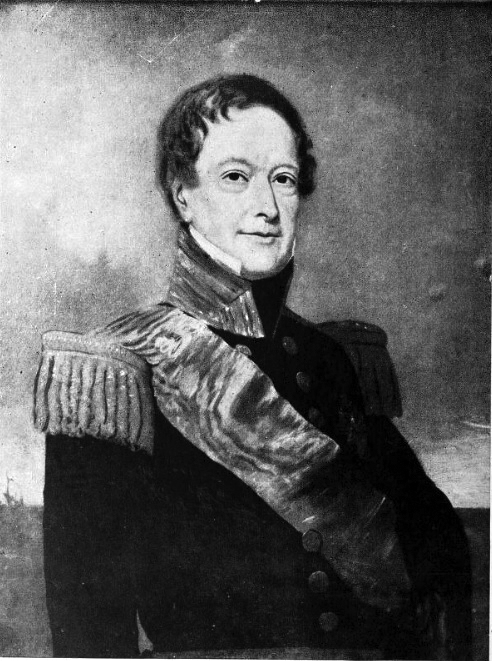
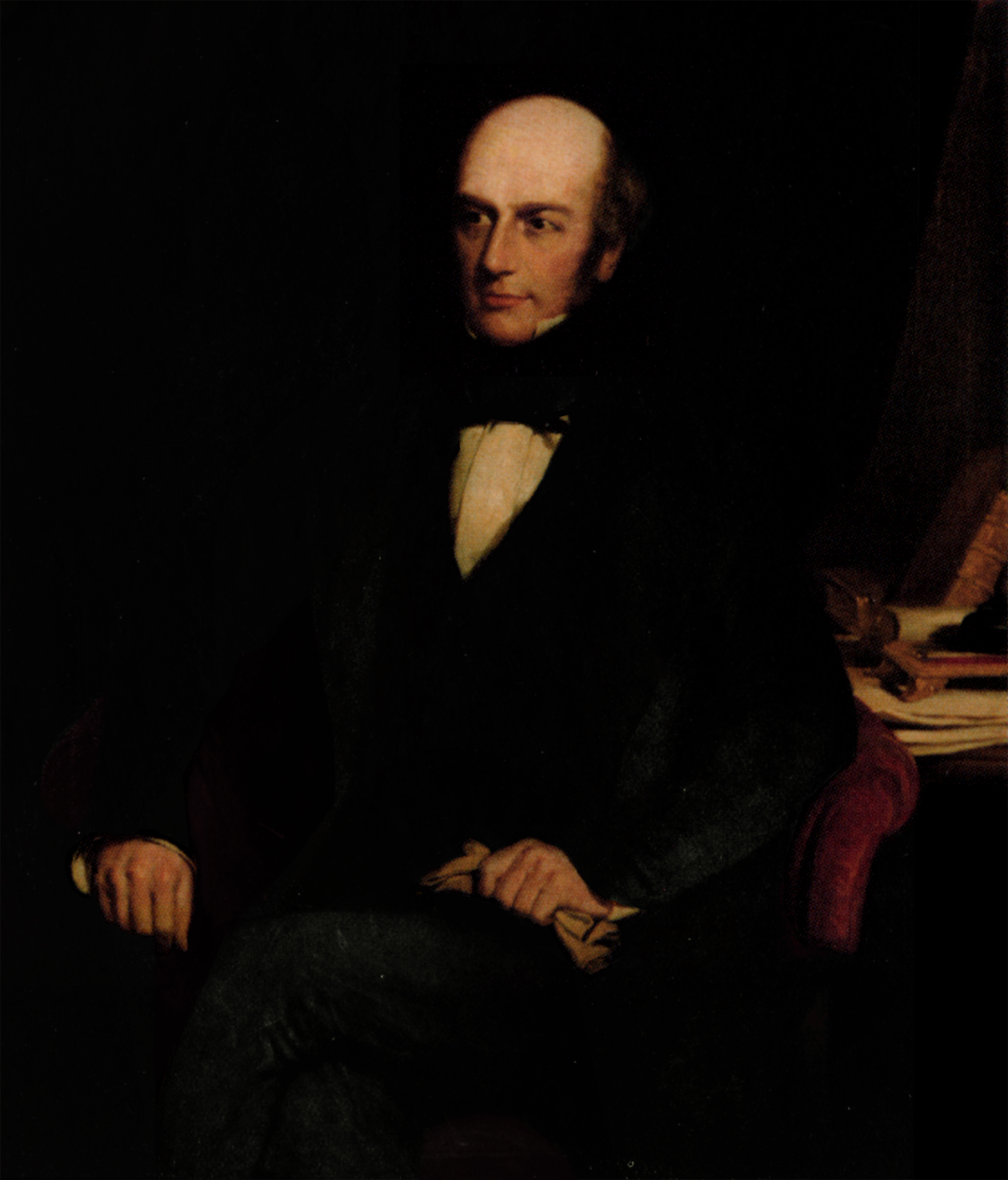
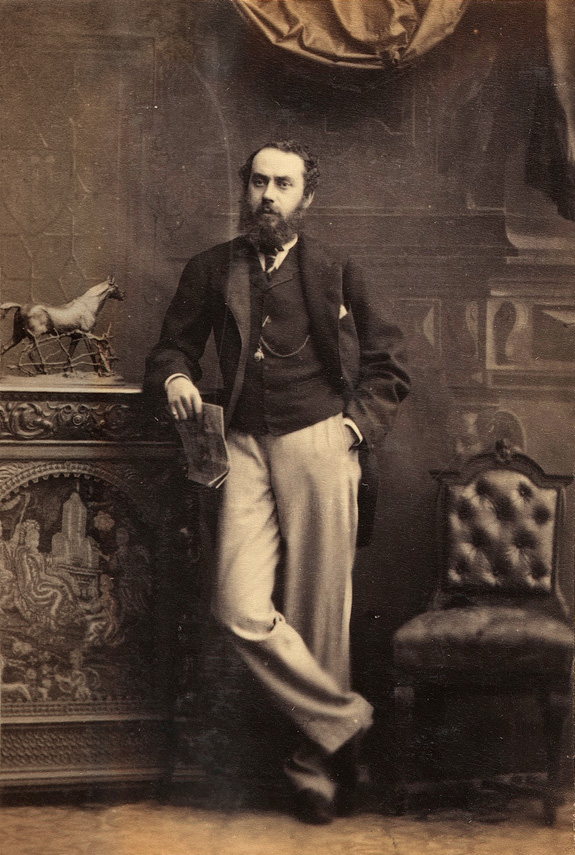
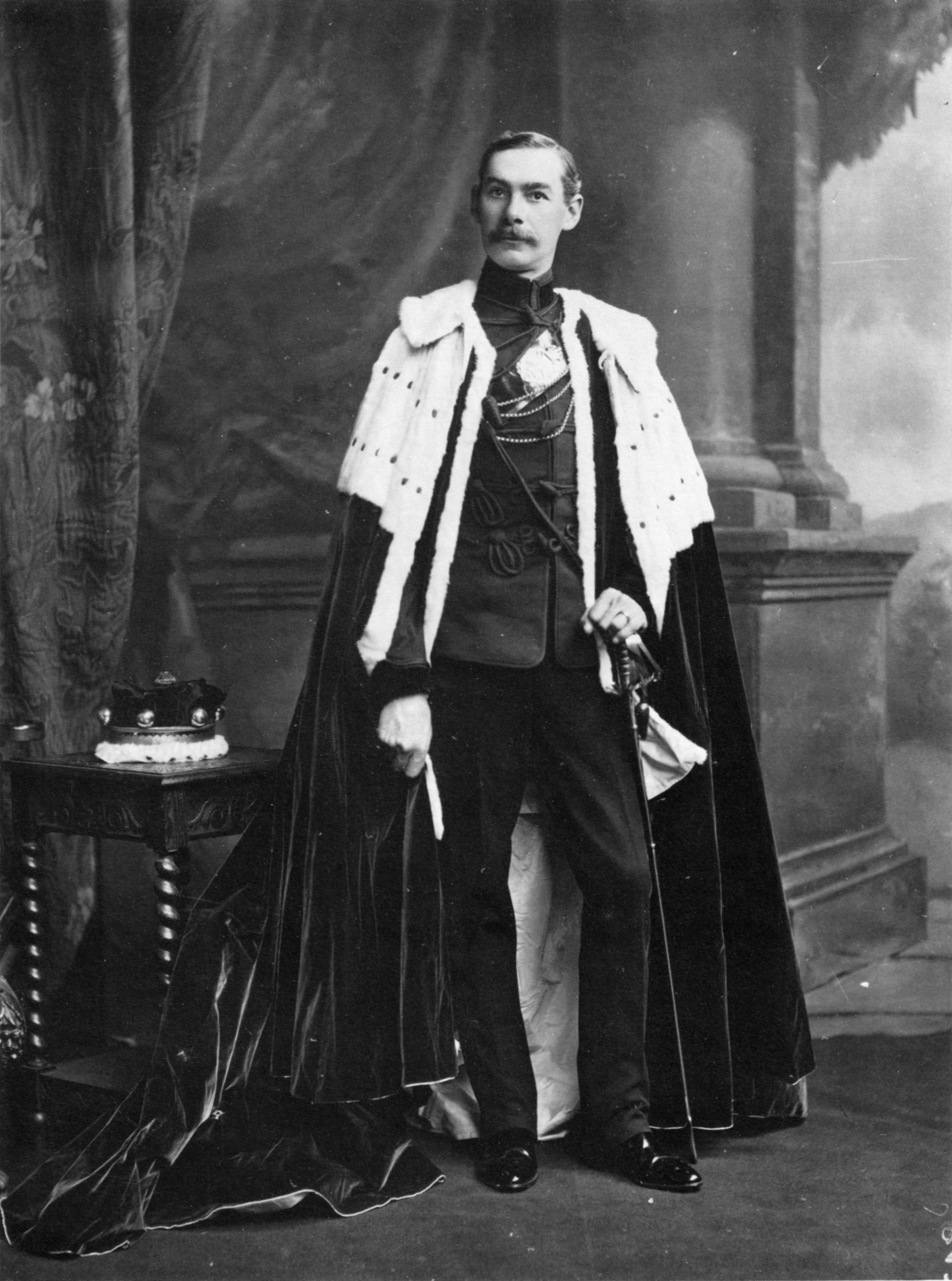
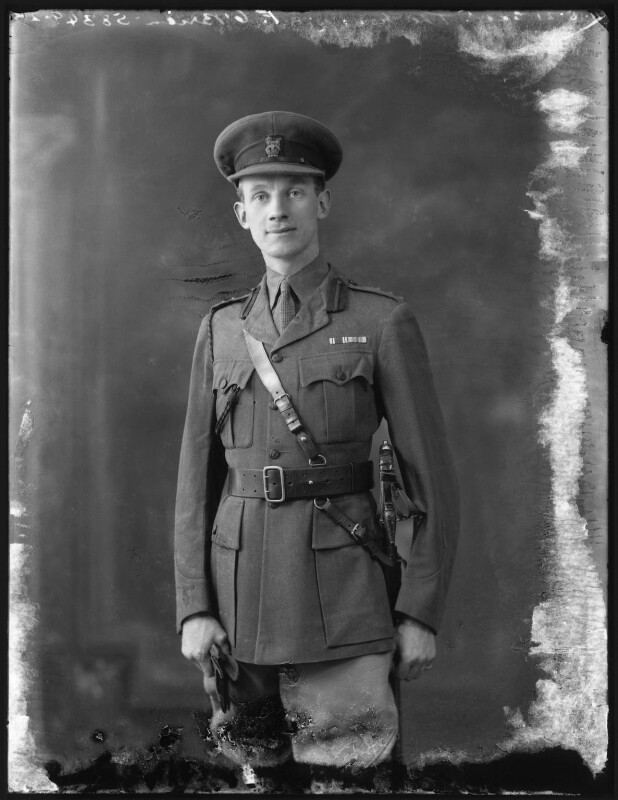
#1; Cas; Dal gCais
#2; Bloid; Uí Bhloid	Caisín; Uí Chaisín
#3; Cairtheann Finn (Note: Said to be king on the arrival of Saint Patrick. Ancestor of both the Uí Óengussa and Uí Thoirdhealbhach branches. Purportedly baptized by Saint Patrick at Saingeal (Singland), Limerick (as per The Tripartite Life of Patrick, page 207, https://archive.org/details/TheTripartiteLifeOfPatrickV1/page/n415/mode/2up).)	Eochaidh
#4; Óengus; Uí Óengussa	#5; Eochaidh; Bailldearg	#6; Cormac Coiche	Bréanainn
Rónáin	#7; Conall; Caemh	Fíonáin
#10; Díoma fl. 629 (Note: Involved in Battle of Carn Feradaig (629). See An Leabhar Muimhneach page 92-94 (linked in references).) (Note: According to another version of his genealogy he was the son of Díomasaigh, son of Rónáin (An Leabhar Muimhneach, page 319).)	#8; Aodh; Craige Léithe (Note: Geographical epithet indicates he may have been the first of Brian's line to settle around Craglea (Killaloe) and so likely a contemporary of Díoma mac Rónáin and a participant in the initial settlement. Ancestor of Uí Floinn and Uí Toirdhealbhach.)	#9; Forannán
#11; Feardomhnach	#12; Ándlidh fl. 697 (Note: One of the eight Munster Kings whose names are recorded as guarantors of the Cáin Adomnáin and is described as rí in Déissi túaiscirt. https://archive.org/details/CainAdamnain/page/n31/mode/2up)	#13; Dubh Dúin	Cathal
Ailill	#14; Cearnach; Uí Chearnaigh	Toirdhealbhach; Uí Thoirdhealbhach
Eichthigheirn; Uì Eichthigheirn	#15; Torpa died 765	Mathgamain
#16; Domhnall	#17; Fíonachta	Anluan
#18; Cormac	Maol Tola "Mothla"	Cuircc
#19; Reabacán (Note: Reabacán mac Mothla is the only king listed for whom no precise pedigree survives. He is included in a list of kings said to be descended from Óengus (see page 316 An Leabhar Muimhneach which is linked in references) and is therefore determined to be of the Uí Óengussa kindred but little else is known on his background. On his 934 death, he is noted in the annals as being both King of the Dal gCais (the earliest extant usage of this dynastic name) and Abbot of Tuaim Gréine. His purported pre-decessor Cormac must have died c. 850AD at the latest as his father Domhnall succeeded Torpaid upon his death in 765. This indicates several generations of Uí Oengusso dynasts for whom the records are lost for.) died 934	Lachtna
#20; 934-942 (Note: Deduced from: • The An Leabhar Muimhneach king list which states that Lorcáin succeeded Reabachán Mac Mothla. • The death date of Reabachán Mac Mothla being 934 (as stated in annals). • The death date of Lorcáin as given in O'Harts Pedigrees (942 AD).); Lorcáin
942-951; Cinnéidigh
951-953; Lachtna	953-970; King of Munster; 970-976; Mathgamain	976-978; King of Munster; 978-1002; High King of Ireland; 1002-1014; Brian; Bórumha; Ua Briain
1014-1025; High King of Ireland; 1025-1063; Donnchad	Tadhg died 1023
King of Munster; 1063-1068; Murchad	King of Munster; 1068-1072; King of Dublin; 1072; High King of Ireland; 1072-1086; Toirdhealbhach
King of Munster; 1086; Tadhg	King of Dublin; 1075-1086; King of Munster; 1086-1101; 1115-1118 (disputed); High King of Ireland; 1101-1114 1118-1119; Muircheartach	King of Munster; 1114-1115; 1115-1118 (disputed); Diarmaid
King of the Isles; 1111-1112 1115; Domhnall	1119-1138; King of Munster; 1138-1142 (claimant); Conchubhar na Cathrach	King of Munster; 1142–1151 (claimant) 1154-1165; Toirdhealbhach	1151-1154; Tadhg
1157; Conchubhar	Muircheartach	King of Munster; 1167-1168 (claimant); Muircheartach	King of Munster; 1168-1194 (claimant); Domhnall Mór	Diarmaid
1194; Muircheartach; Dall	1198; Conchubhar; Ruadh	1198-1242; Donnchadh; Cairbreach
1242-1268; Conchubhar na Siudane
Tadhg; Cael Uisce died v.p 1259; Clann Tadhg	1268-1276; Brian Ruadh; Clann Briain
1276-1306; Toirdhealbhach Mór	Donnchadh	Domhnaill
1306-1311; Donnchadh	1317-1343; Muircheartach	1350–1360; Diarmaid	1311-1313; Diarmaid	1313-1317; Donnchadh	1343-1350; Brian Bán
1360–1369; Mathgamain; Maonmhaighe	1375–1398 (claimant); Toirdhealbhach; Maol
1369–1400; Brian; Sreamhach	1400-1426; Conchubhar
1426–1438; Tadhg an Glemore	1438-1444; Mathgamain; Dall	1444-1459; Toirdhealbhach; Bóg
1459-1461 (claimant); Donnchadh	1459-1466; Tadhg an Chomhaid	1466-1496; Conchubhar na Srona	1496-1498; Toirdhealbhach; Óg
1498-1528; Toirdhealbhach; Donn
1528–1539; Conchubhar	1539–1543; Last King of Thomond 1st Earl of Thomond; 1543–1551 1st Baron Inchiquin; 1543–1551; Murchadh; Carrach
Donough; 2nd Earl of Thomond (Note: Via special remainder from his uncle.); 1551-1553	Dermot; 2nd Baron Inchiquin; 1551–1557	Donough died 1582
Connor; 3rd Earl of Thomond; 1553-1581	Murrough; 3rd Baron Inchiquin; 1557–1573	Connor died 1603
Donough; 4th Earl of Thomond; 1581-1624	Daniel; 1st Viscount Clare; 1662-1663	Murrough; 4th Baron Inchiquin; 1573–1597	Donough died 1634
Henry; 5th Earl of Thomond; 1624-1639	Barnabas; 6th Earl of Thomond; 1639-1657	Connor; 2nd Viscount Clare; 1663-1670	Dermot; 5th Baron Inchiquin; 1597–1624	Connor died 1651
Henry; 7th Earl of Thomond; 1657-1691	Daniel; 3rd Viscount Clare; 1670-1691	Murrough; 6th Baron Inchiquin; 1624–1674; 1st Earl of Inchiquin; 1654–1674	Donough; 1st Baronet of Leameneh; 1686-1717
Henry Horatio; Lord Ibrackan died v.p 1690	Daniel; 4th Viscount Clare; 1691-1693	Charles; 5th Viscount Clare; 1693-1706	William; 2nd Earl of Inchiquin; 7th Baron of Inchiquin; 1674–1692	Lucius died v.p 1717
Henry; 8th Earl of Thomond; 1691-1741	Charles; 6th Viscount Clare; 1706-1761; 9th Earl of Thomond (titular); 1741-1761	William; 3rd Earl of Inchiquin; 8th Baron of Inchiquin; 1692–1719	Edward; 2nd Baronet of Leameneh; 1717-1765
Charles; 7th Viscount Clare; 10th Earl of Thomond (titular); 1761-1774	William; 4th Earl of Inchiquin; 9th Baron of Inchiquin; 1719–1777	James died 1771	Lucius Henry; 3rd Baronet of Leameneh; 1765-1795
Murrough; 5th Earl of Inchiquin; 10th Baron of Inchiquin; 1777–1808; 1st Marquess of Thomond; 1800-1808	Edward Dominic died 1801	Edward; 4th Baronet of Leameneh; 1795-1837
William; 2nd Marquess of Thomond; 6th Earl of Inchiquin; 11th Baron of Inchiquin; 1808-1846	James; 3rd Marquess of Thomond; 7th Earl of Inchiquin; 12th Baron of Inchiquin; 1846-1855	Lucius; 5th Baronet of Leameneh; 1837-1855; 13th Baron Inchiquin; 1855-1872
Edward Donogh; 14th Baron Inchiquin; 1872-1900
Lucius William; 15th Baron Inchiquin; 1900-1929	Murrough died 1934
Donough Edward Foster; 16th Baron Inchiquin; 1929-1968	Phaedrig Lucius Ambrose; 17th Baron Inchiquin; 1968-1982	Fionn Myles Maryons died 1977	Murrough Richard died 2000
Conor Myles John; 18th Baron Inchiquin; 1982-2023	Conor John Anthony; 19th Baron Inchiquin; 2023-present

== Annalistic references ==
- AI1021.2 Mael Muire Ua Gébennaig, eminent priest of Dál Cais, rested.

== Legacy ==
In two different election pamphlets, Éamon de Valera's Fianna Fáil party addressed voters as "Dalcassians", the term having become a romantic synecdoche for the Irish as a whole.

== See also ==
- Irish nobility
- Irish royal families
- Pre-Norman invasion Irish Celtic kinship groups, from whom many of the modern Irish surnames came from
