= Galvin (surname) =

Galvin (Gallivan) is a name of Irish extraction which originated as a Clare sept of the Dál Cais dynasty. According to historian C. Thomas Cairney, the O'Galvins were one of the chiefly families of the Dal gCais or Dalcassians who were a tribe of the Erainn who were the second wave of Celts to settle in Ireland between about 500 and 100 BC.

Notable people with the surname include:

- Bob Galvin (1922–2011), Chairman and CEO of Motorola
- Connor Galvin (born 2000), American football player
- Elliot Galvin, British musician
- Fred Galvin, American mathematician
- John Galvin (soldier), American general and academic administrator
- John Galvin (Irish politician), Irish Fianna Fáil politician
- Keith Galvin, Gaelic footballer
- Kevin Galvin, business activist
- Martin Galvin, Irish-American lawyer and political activist
- Mick Galvin Irish footballer
- Noah Galvin, American actor
- Pat Galvin (1911–1980), Australian politician
- Pat Galvin (public servant) (born 1933), Australian public servant
- Patrick Galvin, Irish writer and poet
- Patrick Galvin (footballer) (1882–1918), English footballer
- Paul Galvin (businessman), founder of Galvin Manufacturing Corporation, later renamed Motorola
- Paul Galvin (Gaelic footballer), Irish footballer
- Pud Galvin, American baseball player
- Sheila Galvin Irish politician
- Tony Galvin, Irish soccer player
- William Francis Galvin (b. 1950), Massachusetts Secretary of the Commonwealth

== See also ==
- Irish clans
