= Ó Meadhra =

Ó Meadhra is a Gaelic-Irish surname. According to historian C. Thomas Cairney, the O'Mearas were one of the chiefly families of the Dal gCais or Dalcassians who were a tribe of the Erainn who were the second wave of Celts to settle in Ireland between about 500 and 100 BC.

== Overview ==
The Ó Meadhra clan were a sept of the Dal gCais, and the name is most common in the dynasty's homeland of north-east Thomond (presently County Tipperary and the adjoining parts of County Clare). The family seat was Toomevara (O'Meara's tumulus).

Members of the family were physicians and poets to the Earl of Ormond. The last Gaelic-era Chief of the Name was Domhnall Ó Meadhra.

Ó Meadhra was Anglicized as O'Meara and O'Mara, both of which may not necessarily have an "O'" prefix.

== See also ==
- Irish clans
