= Neylon =

Neylon is an anglicized version of the Irish surname Ó Nialláin. Other English language forms of the name include Nealon, O'Neylan, Nyland and Neilan. They were a sept of the Dalcassian (Irish: Dál gCais) tribe located in the kingdom of Thomond, which is now predominantly modern-day County Clare but encompassed parts of modern-day Tipperary and Limerick. Some early references to the name in this area come from references made to the completion in 1016 of a fortified dwelling overlooking Ballyalla lake, north of Ennis, which had the blessing of the ruling O'Brien family.

Throughout the reign of the O'Briens in the region the Neylon family acted as medics and clergy as well as providing soldiers for the kingdom's defence. Two such examples of this are Ailill Ua Nialláin (d. 1093) who was Abbot of Clonmacnoise and a James Neylon who graduated from Oxford University with a degree in Arts and Medicine in the 16th century.

During the course of the 1594 John Neylon, son of then Bishop of Kildare Daniel Neylon (or O'Neylan as he is recorded in some documents), was bequeathed the castle of Dysert O'Dea near Corofin along with other lands in Inchiquin. However, during the Cromwellian and Williamite wars of the 17th century a lot of Irish nobles lost their land and titles after the outcomes of these wars didn't go in their favour and English rule in Ireland took a firm grip. The Neylon family appeared to remain in the general area but no longer at the centre of political affairs.

Like many other Irish families, the Great Irish Famine of the 1840s caused many members of the Neylon to emigrate to Britain, America and even further afield in order to survive. The Neylon name is still commonly found in many parts of Ireland.

== Popularity ==
67% of the Neylons live in Ireland, 20% live in the USA, 8% in the United Kingdom while 5% of the Neylons live in a non-mentioned country.

== Coat of arms ==
The family coat of arms constitutes two unicorns on a black background with a hand holding a dagger over the shield. In medieval heraldry these symbols are interpreted as follows:

Unicorn - Extreme courage; virtue and strength

Black (Sable) Background - Constancy or grief

Dagger - Justice and military honour
