= Hourigan =

Hourigan is a surname. Notable people with the surname include:

- Christopher Hourigan, Physician-scientist
- Jack Hourigan (born 1968), Canadian actress
- Neasa Hourigan (born 1980), Irish politician
- Michael Hourigan, Irish politician in County Limerick
- Paige Mary Hourigan (born 1997), New Zealand tennis player
- Patrick Hourigan (1934–2022), Irish politician
- Richard Hourigan (1939–2002), Irish politician
