= Muldowney =

Muldowney is an Irish surname. Notable people with the surname include:

- Aly Muldowney (born 1983), English rugby player
- Brendan Muldowney, graduate of Dun Laoghaire Institute of Art and Design, Ireland (The National Film School)
- Dominic Muldowney (born 1952), British composer
- Joey Muldowney (born 2004), American ice hockey player
- Luke Muldowney (born 1986), English footballer
- Michael Joseph Muldowney (1889–1947), Republican member of the U.S. House of Representatives from Pennsylvania
- Shirley Muldowney (born 1940), pioneer in professional auto racing
- Suzanne Muldowney (born 1952), performance artist best known for her appearances on The Howard Stern Show
- Sylvester Muldowney (1908–1995), Irish hurler
- Therese Muldowney (born 1987), camogie player and social worker, who played in the 2009 All Ireland camogie final
