= Keelty =

Keelty is an Irish surname. Notable people with the surname include:

- James Keelty (1911–2003), American real estate developer and baseball team owner
- Mick Keelty (born 1954), Australian police officer

== See also ==
- Kielty
- Quilty
