= Christopher Hourigan =

Leukemia physician scientist

- Education: Oxford University
- Known for: Acute Myeloid Leukemia and Measurable Residual Disease
- Awards: Alpha Omega Alpha, Johns Hopkins Chapter; Honorary Fellow, Royal College of Physicians, NHLBI Directors Award; NHLBI Orloff Award; NIH Bench to Bedside Award; NIH Directors Challenge Innovation Award; American College of Physicians Early Career Physician Award; American Society for Clinical Investigation Young Physician-Scientist Award; Presidential Early Career Award for Scientists and Engineers (2019)
- Scientific career
- Workplaces: National Institutes of Health

Christopher Hourigan is a physician-scientist known for work on measurable residual disease (MRD; previously termed minimal residual disease) in acute myeloid leukemia.

He was previously Chief of the Laboratory of Myeloid Malignancies at the National Heart, Lung, and Blood Institute and founding co-director of the Myeloid Malignancies Program at the National Institutes of Health in Bethesda, Maryland.

== Education ==
Hourigan graduated from Oxford University Medical School and received his DPhil for work with Sir John Bell (physician) at the Weatherall Institute of Molecular Medicine at Oxford University. He completed postdoctoral clinical training at Guy's and St Thomas' Hospital in London, Johns Hopkins Bayview Medical Center, and the Sidney Kimmel Comprehensive Cancer Center at Johns Hopkins Hospital in Baltimore. He is board certified in Internal Medicine, Hematology, and Medical Oncology.

== Research ==
Hourigan is best known for work on Measurable Residual Disease (MRD) and precision medicine in Acute Myeloid Leukemia (AML). This included the demonstration that intervention in patients with AML MRD may improve survival, that low-level TP53 mutations are detectable pre-transplantation in patients with sickle cell disease who develop myeloid malignancy after hematopoietic stem cell transplantation, and that patient-personalized single cell sequencing can distinguish mutations associated with non-malignant cells rather than residual AML. He has held senior leadership positions in the European Leukemia Network (ELN) guidelines committee for AML MRD, the Foundation for the National Institutes of Health (FNIH) biomarkers consortium for AML MRD, the National Cancer Institute (NCI) MyeloMATCH precision medicine initiative, the Center for International Blood and Marrow Transplant Research (CIBMTR), and on the American Society of Hematology (ASH) guidelines committee for AML in older adults.

== Honors and awards ==
In 2019, Hourigan received a Presidential Early Career Award for Scientists and Engineers for his research on Measurable Residual Disease in Acute Myeloid Leukemia.

In 2020, Hourigan was awarded the National Heart, Lung, and Blood Institute Orloff Award and honored for one of the top NIH accomplishments of 2020.

== Selected publications ==
- Hourigan, C. S., Dillon, L. W., Gui, G., Logan, B. R., Fei, M., Ghannam, J., ... & Horwitz, M. E. (2020). Impact of conditioning intensity of allogeneic transplantation for acute myeloid leukemia with genomic evidence of residual disease. Journal of Clinical Oncology, 38(12), 1273–1283.
- Schuurhuis GJ, Heuser M, Freeman S, Béné MC, Buccisano F, Cloos J, Grimwade D, Haferlach T, Hills RK, Hourigan CS, Jorgensen JL. Minimal/measurable residual disease in AML: a consensus document from the European LeukemiaNet MRD Working Party. Blood, The Journal of the American Society of Hematology. 2018 Mar 22;131(12):1275-91.
- Tyner JW, Tognon CE, Bottomly D, Wilmot B, Kurtz SE, Savage SL, Long N, Schultz AR, Traer E, Abel M, Agarwal A. Functional genomic landscape of acute myeloid leukaemia. Nature. 2018 Oct;562(7728):526-31. (PMC open access)
- Hourigan, C. S., & Karp, J. E. (2013). Minimal residual disease in acute myeloid leukaemia. Nature reviews Clinical oncology, 10(8), 460–471.
- Hourigan, C. S., Gale, R. P., Gormley, N. J., Ossenkoppele, G. J., & Walter, R. B. (2017). Measurable residual disease testing in acute myeloid leukaemia. Leukemia, 31(7), 1482–1490.
