= Sylvester Muldowney =

Irish hurler

Personal information
- Native name: Sailbheastar Ó Maoldomhnaigh (Irish)
- Nickname: Vesty
- Born: 14 January 1908 Rialto, Dublin, Ireland
- Died: 6 April 1995 (aged 87) Terenure, Dublin, Ireland
- Occupation: Accountant

Sport
- Sport: Hurling
- Position: Midfield
Club
- Years: Club
- Kevin's
Club titles
- Dublin titles: 0
Inter-county
- Years: County
- 1932–1934: Dublin
Inter-county titles
- Leinster titles: 1
- All-Irelands: 0
- NHL: 0

Sylvester James "Vesty" Muldowney, KC*SG, (14 January 1908 – 6 April 1995) was an Irish hurler who played as a left wing-forward for the Dublin senior team.

Born in Rialto, Dublin, Muldowney first played competitive hurling during his schooling at Synge Street CBS. He arrived on the inter-county scene at the age of twenty-four when he first linked up with the Dublin senior team. He made his debut during the 1932 championship. Muldowney immediately became a regular member of the starting fifteen and won one Leinster medal. He was an All-Ireland runner-up on one occasion.

At club level Muldowney was a one-time championship medallist in the junior grade with Kevin's.

Muldowney retired from inter-county hurling following the conclusion of the 1934 championship.

== Playing career ==
=== Club ===
In 1939 Muldowney enjoyed his biggest success with Kevin's when he won a championship medal in the junior grade.

=== Inter-county ===
Muldowney first played for Dublin as a member of the senior team in 1932. He was a Leinster runner-up that year as Kilkenny retained the provincial title following a narrow 4-6 to 3-5 victory.

In 1934 Muldowney won a Leinster medal following a 3-5 to 2-2 provincial decider defeat of Kilkenny after an earlier draw. The subsequent All-Ireland decider on 2 September 1934 saw Limerick providing the opposition. After being in arrears by one point at the interval, the second half was also keenly contested. Dinny O'Neill scored the vital goal which secured a 3-4 to 2-7 draw. The replay on 30 September 1934 was also a close affair with the sides level for much of the match. Dave Clohessy was the goal-scoring hero for Limerick as he bagged four in total to secure a 5-2 to 2-6 victory for the Shannonsiders.

== Personal life ==
Born in Rialto, Muldowney was the fourth child born to Patrick V. Muldowney (1866-1928) and Polly Collins (1878-1950). His father, a native of Laois, was a publican and grocer in Kilmainham. Muldowney had seven siblings: Paddy (born 1900), Maureen (1902-1995), Kevin (1906-1907), Ned (1909-1937), Dick (1911-1981), Joe (born 1914) and Dolly (1916-1939).

Educated at Synge Street CBS, Muldowney was noted as a keen sportsman and was long jump champion in 1926. He subsequently qualified as a chartered accountant and set up a practice with Harry Grant known as Muldowney Grant & Co. He later amalgamated with Oliver Freaney & Co. in the early 1970s.

Muldowney was on the board of a number of businesses in Dublin, as well as being chairman of St. Joseph’s Hospital in Raheny and a board member of the Central Bank of Ireland. Active in politics Muldowney was chairman of the national executive of Fine Gael.

He was married to Mary Harvey (1909-2001), the couple had five children. Muldowney died on 6 April 1995.

== Honours ==
=== Team ===
Kevin's

- Dublin Junior Hurling Championship (1): 1939

Dublin

- Leinster Senior Hurling Championship (1): 1934
