= Kielty =

Kielty is an Irish surname. Notable people with the surname include:

- Bobby Kielty (born 1976), American baseball player
- Patrick Kielty (born 1971), Northern Irish comedian and television personality
- Stan Kielty (1925–2008), English rugby league footballer

== See also ==
- Keelty
- Quilty
