= Ó hAichir =

Irish surname

Ó hAichir is an Irish surname, also rendered as Ó hEithir and anglicised as O'Hehir, Hehir, O'Hare and Hare, among other forms. It was borne by a ruling family of medieval Thomond. The annals record Donnchadh Ua hAichir (d. 1099) as lord of Magh Adhair. The family was later associated with the territory of Uí Chormaic, which corresponded roughly to the parish of Kilmaley in the barony of Islands, County Clare.

The family's origin is disputed. The Dalcassian genealogies preserved in An Leabhar Muimhneach derive the Uí Aichir from Clann Scannláin, a branch of Clann Ailgile. In 1862 John O'Donovan assigned them instead to the Uí Fidgenti of County Limerick, and Patrick Woulfe followed him. Edward MacLysaght describes the name as Dalcassian, while allowing that some of its bearers are probably of Uí Fidgeinte origin.

== Name ==
Woulfe explains the name as "descendant of Aichear", a personal name meaning "sharp, bitter, angry". He records anglicised forms including O Haghir, O Hagher, O'Hehir, O'Haire, O'Hare, Hegher, Hehir, Aher, Hair and Hare, and notes that the Irish form is also written Ó hAithchir and Ó hOichir.

As in other Irish surnames beginning with a vowel, the prefixed h stays lower case when the name is written in capitals: Ó hAICHIR (or Ó ʜAICHIR, with a small-capital h).

== Origins ==
=== Dalcassian genealogy ===
An Leabhar Muimhneach is a compilation of Munster genealogies, edited by Tadhg Ó Donnchadha for the Irish Manuscripts Commission. It names Ailgil (Ailgeinén) as a son of Toirdhealbhach, whose son Mathghamhain was the ancestor of the line of Brian Bóruma. Ailgil's descendants are given the heading Clann Ailghile. One of the seven sons of Ailgil's son Eochaidh was Scannlán, "from whom are Clann Scannláin".

A later passage on Clann Ailgile lists the Uí Aichir among the descendants of Scannlán and gives their pedigree. Braen, son of Cearbhall, son of Scannlán, had four sons. The first of them, Aicher, was the ancestor of the Uí Aichir (Aicher ó [d]tait Ui Aichir mic Braoin). Elsewhere the text gives the same descent for Braen's son Artúr, ancestor of the Artúraigh: Artúr, son of Braen, son of Cearbhall, son of Scannlán, son of Eochaidh, son of Ailgeinén. The same section records that Maicín mac Brain was killed at the siege of Magh Adhair by Flann mac Maíl Sechnaill.

John O'Hart likewise described "the O'h-Aichir, O'Haithchir, O'Hehir, Hehir, and Hare" as "all one family, of the Dal-Cas sept".

=== Uí Fidgeinte attribution ===
O'Donovan's notes to the Annals of the Four Masters identify Ua hAichir with the modern O'Hehir, Hehir and Hare. They place the family in Uí Chormaic, between Slieve Callan and Ennis. A further note says that the family was driven from Magh Adhair by the Uí Caisin and then settled in Uí Chormaic. These notes do not discuss the family's descent.

The attribution to the Uí Fidgeinte appears in a later work. O'Donovan edited the topographical poem of Giolla na Naomh Ó hUidhrín (d. 1420), published in 1862. In his note on Uí Chormaic he stated that O'h-Aichir was "of the sept of the Ui-Fidhgeinte". He placed them among the descendants of Eoghan, son of Ailill Aulom, rather than of Cormac Cas. He cited no source for this, and added that no account had yet been found of when or how they settled in Thomond. The quatrain to which the note is attached describes the Uí Chormaic as "of the race of Eoghan, of the region of Cliach" and assigns their land to O'h-Aichir.

Woulfe repeated O'Donovan's attribution. He described the family as long settled in Thomond but not of Dalcassian stock, being a branch of the Uí Fidgeinte. MacLysaght, as noted above, treats the name as Dalcassian and the Uí Fidgeinte connection as applying to some of its bearers only.

== Territory ==
=== Magh Adhair ===
The Four Masters call Donnchadh Ua hAichir (d. 1099) "lord of Magh-Adhair". The same annal records the death of Mac Conmara, lord of Uí Caisin. Magh Adhair was the inauguration site of the kings of Thomond. O'Donovan describes it as a level district between Ennis and Tulla. He remarks that the O'Hehirs appear to have been seated there before the MacNamaras.

=== Uí Chormaic and Uí Flannchadha ===
A verse in An Leabhar Muimhneach lists Uí Chormaic, along with Tradraighe, among the peoples ag foghnamh ríogh Deirgdheirc ("serving the king of Dergderc"). The Annals of Inisfallen record that in 1070 "Donnchadh son of Aicher, king of Uí Chormaic and Uí Chonaill", died at Inis Cathaig (Scattery Island). (Note: The annal gives a patronymic (mac Aichir) rather than the surname Ua hAichir.)

In Ó hUidhrín's poem the land of the Uí Chormaic belongs to O'h-Aichir, and "a noble sept of the Ui-Aichirs" rules over Uí Flannchadha. O'Donovan could not locate Uí Flannchadha, but thought it probably adjoined Uí Chormaic. He identified Uí Chormaic with a district comprising the parish of Kilmaley. Edmund Hogan gives Uí Chormaic as including Kilmaley and the rest of the barony of Islands except the parish of Clondagad, and places the Uí Aichir in that barony. In 1839, writing for the Ordnance Survey, Eugene O'Curry reported a local tradition: the parish of Kilmaley was coextensive with "Hy-Cormaic, the Patrimony of O'h-Aichir". He doubted, though, that the territory had always been confined to the parish.

== History ==
=== Medieval period ===
The surname appears in the annals from the late 11th century:

- 1094: Amhlaeibh Ua hAichir was among the chieftains slain at the battle of Fidhnacha.
- 1095: the wife of Donnchadh Ua hAichir died in a great pestilence.
- 1099: Donnchadh Ua hAichir died. The Annals of Inisfallen call him "the most hospitable man in Tuadmumu". The Four Masters call him lord of Magh Adhair.
- 1151: four of the Uí Aichir are listed among the slain at the Battle of Móin Mhór, in a roll that the Four Masters took from the Book of Lecan.
- 1203: Áed Ua hAichir took Conchobar Ruad out of Limerick.
- 1308: Ó hAichir and Ó Dedaid, "two good chiefs of Tuadmumu", were slain.
- 1312: Lochlainn Ó hAichir and Muirchertach, son of (Mael) Pátraic Ó hAichir, are named in the annal for the wars in Thomond that year.

The O'Hehirs were among the families buried in the Franciscan friary at Ennis.

=== Early modern period ===
The Books of Survey and Distribution record the land held in County Clare in 1641. In the parish of Kilmaley, members of the family appear as proprietors in some two dozen townland entries, including Ballyillaun, Cahermore, Garrynagry, Kilcolumb, Kinturk and Sheeaun. After the Cromwellian confiscations these lands passed mainly to Nicholas Bourke and Lord Clare. In the "census" of 1659, O'Hehir (14 householders) is listed among the principal Irish names in the barony of Islands.

== Distribution ==
In 1890, 28 births under the name Hehir were registered in Ireland, 18 of them in County Clare and four in County Limerick.

== People ==
People with this surname or a variant of it include:

- Diana O'Hehir (1922–2021), American poet
- Jack Hehir, Irish soccer player
- Martin Hehir (1855–1935), Roman Catholic priest and fourth president of Pittsburgh Catholic College
- Michael O'Hehir (1920–1996), Irish Gaelic games and horse racing commentator and journalist
- Paddy Hehir (1889–1954), Australian cycling champion
- Patrick Hehir (1859–1937), British military surgeon
- Peter Hehir, Australian actor
- Vanessa Hehir (born 1981), English actress
- William Hehir (1887–1972), British track and field athlete
- William Hehir (bassist) (born 1988), American bassist and member of Misterwives
- Breandán Ó hEithir (1930–1990), Irish writer and broadcaster

== See also ==
- O'Hare
- O'Hara
- O'Hair
