= Connor O'Brien, 3rd Earl of Thomond =

Defeated at Spancel Hill (1535–1581)

Connor O'Brien
- Earl of Thomond
- Tenure: 1553–1581
- Predecessor: Donogh, 2nd Earl
- Successor: Donogh, 4th Earl
- Born: 1535
- Died: 1581 (aged 45–46)
- Spouses: 1. Ellen MacCarthy; 2. Una O'Brien-Ara
- Issue Detail: Donough, Daniel, & others
- Father: Donogh, 2nd Earl of Thomond
- Mother: Helen Butler

Connor O'Brien, 3rd Earl of Thomond also spelt Conor and called Groibleach, or the "long-nailed", (Irish: Conchobhar Groibleach Ó Briain; 1535–1581) contended with his uncle Donnell for the Chieftainship of Clan O'Brien from 1535 to 1565. He was confirmed as 3rd Earl of Thomond in 1558 by the Lord Deputy of Ireland, Thomas Radclyffe, 3rd Earl of Sussex. O'Brien intrigued with fitz Maurice in 1569 during the 1st Desmond Rebellion and fled to France. He returned and was pardoned in 1571, being restored to his lands at the end of the rebellion in 1573.

== Birth and origins ==
Connor was born in 1535, the eldest son of Donogh O'Brien and his wife Helen Butler. His father was the 2nd Earl of Thomond. He had obtained the earldom by an agreement by which he succeeded his uncle Murrough O'Brien, 1st Earl of Thomond as 2nd earl. His father's family, the O'Briens, were a Gaelic Irish dynasty that descended from Brian Boru, medieval high king of Ireland.

His mother was the youngest daughter of Piers Butler, 8th Earl of Ormond. His mother's family, the Butlers, were an Old English dynasty that descended from Theobald Walter, who had been appointed Chief Butler of Ireland by King Henry II in 1177.

Family tree

Connor O'Brien with his second wife, his parents, and other selected relatives. (Note: This family tree is based on genealogies of the earls of Thomond. and the earls of Clancarty.)

Toirdhealbhach; Donn; King of Thomond; 1499–1528
Connor; King of Thomond d. 1540	Murrough; 1st Earl; Thomond d. 1551	Eleanor; FitzGerald
Donogh; 2nd Earl d. 1553	Helen; Butler; 1523–1597	Donnell; O'Brien d. 1579	Dermod; 2nd Baron; Inchiquin d. 1557
Connor; 3rd Earl c. 1535 – 1581	Una; O'Brien d. 1589	Murrough; 3rd Baron c. 1550 – 1573
Helen; Roche d. 1583	Donogh; 4th Earl d. 1624	Elizabeth; FitzGerald d. 1617	Murrough; 4th Baron; 1562–1597
Margaret; O'Brien	Henry; 5th Earl c. 1588 – 1639	Barnabas; 6th Earl c. 1590 – 1657	Dermot; 5th Baron; 1594–1624
Henry; 7th Earl; 1620–1691	Murrough; 1st Earl; 1614–1674

Legend

XXX	Subject of the article	XXX	Kings & Earls of Thomond	XXX	Barons & Earls of Inchiquin

== Succession dispute ==
O'Brien should have normally succeeded his father on his death on 1 April 1553 as the third earl of Thomond according to English primogeniture. However, at that time O'Brien was only 18; he would have become a ward and the lands would have reverted to the crown until his coming of age. To avoid a wardship, his father appointed O'Brien's uncle Donnell as his tanist (successor) according to Brehon law. His uncle Donnell was formally inaugurated as the O'Brien (chief of the name) and chieftain of the Dal Cais (Dalcassians). He usurped the earldom but was never recognised as earl, whereas O'Brien was counted as the 3rd Earl.

Obliged to surrender Clonroad Castle (near Ennis), the usual residence of his parents, Thomond, as he now was, retreated to Doonmulvihill Castle, on the borders of Galway. Even there he was pursued and besieged by Donnell but relieved by his cousin Thomas Butler, 10th Earl of Ormond.

Subsequently, Donnell petitioned for official recognition as chief of Thomond, and St. Leger, though unable to grant his request, promised to write to Queen Mary in his favour. Matters continued in this uncertain state till the summer of 1558, when the Earl of Sussex, having marched to Limerick with a large army, caused Donnell, Teige and Donough, sons of Murrough, 1st Earl of Thomond, to be proclaimed traitors, and Thomond to be reinstated in his possessions.

Donnell took refuge with Maguire in Fermanagh, and Teige and Donough found a powerful protector in Gerald FitzGerald, 14th Earl of Desmond.

== Marriages ==
=== First marriage ===
Thomond's first marriage was childless. His bride probably was Evelyn, also called Ellen, daughter of Donal MacCarthy and widow (his 4th wife) of James FitzGerald, 13th Earl of Desmond. His marriage was short: they married in 1559 but she died in 1560 and was buried in Muckross Abbey. However, according to a minority view, she was Joan, daughter of Thomas, 16th Baron of Kerry.

=== Second marriage and children ===
After the death of his first wife in 1560, Thomond married secondly Una, daughter of Turlough O'Brien-Arra in the barony of Owney and Arra, County Tipperary.

Connor and Una had three sons:

1. Donogh (died 1624), his successor, the 4th Earl of Thomond
2. Teige, of Dromore Castle (died c. 1642), married 1st Siana, daughter of Teige McMorough; and 2ndly Joan, daughter of Sir Dermot Shaughnessy and widow of Sir William Bourke
3. Daniel (died 1663), created 1st Viscount Clare
4. Hugh

—and three daughters:

1. Mary, wife of Turlough Roe MacMahon of Corcovaskin
2. Margaret, second wife of James Butler, 2nd Lord Dunboyne
3. Honora, first wife of Thomas Fitzmaurice, 18th Lord Kerry

== Resumption of the succession dispute ==
Peace prevailed for a brief season, and Thomond won Sussex's approbation for his good execution of justice. But in 1559 his uncles Teige and Donough returned to Inchiquin, and not merely defied Thomond's efforts to oust them, but, with the assistance of the Earl of Desmond, actually inflicted a sharp defeat on him and his ally, the Earl of Clanricarde, at the Battle of Spancel Hill. Teige was shortly afterwards arrested by Lord-justice William FitzWilliam, and confined in Dublin Castle; but early in 1562 he escaped, and, being joined by Donnell, they opposed Thomond with a formidable army. With the help of some ordnance lent him by Sussex, Thomond succeeded in wresting Ballyally and Ballycarhy from them; and eventually, in April 1565, having reduced the country to a wilderness, Donnell consented to surrender his claim to the lordship of Thomond on condition of receiving Corcomroe. War broke out again in the following year; but the resources of the combatants were exhausted, and Sidney, when he visited Limerick in April 1567, described it as utterly impoverished owing to Thomond's "insufficiency to govern".

== First Desmond Rebellion ==
The suspicion with which Thomond was regarded made him discontented, and on 8 July 1569 he entered into a league with the "archtraitor" fitz Maurice (d. 1579). In February 1570 Thomond attacked the President of Connaught, Sir Edward Fitton, at Ennis, and compelled him to seek refuge in Galway. A strong force under the Earl of Ormond was immediately despatched against him, and a few weeks later he submitted unconditionally. But being "seized with sorrow and regret for having surrendered his towns and prisoners", and determined never to "submit himself to the law, or to the mercy of the council of Ireland", he fled in the beginning of June to France.

In Paris Thomond introduced himself on 18 July to Sir Henry Norris, 1st Baron Norreys, the English ambassador, and, after protesting his loyalty, begged him to intercede with Queen Elizabeth for his pardon. Norris, who thought him a "barbarous man", wanting "neither vainglory or deceitfulness, and yet in his talk very simple", soon became aware that he was intriguing with the French court, and urged Elizabeth to coax him home at any price. Elizabeth, though she spoke of him as a "person of small value" and declined to pardon him beforehand, was sufficiently alive to his power to do mischief, and promised if he returned to give his grievances a favourable hearing. But Thomond showed no disposition to leave Paris, and Norris was forced to lend him a hundred crowns and make endless promises before he would consent to take his departure.

== Later life ==
Thomond returned to Ireland in December, and, having made public confession of his treason to Sir Henry Sidney, he was pardoned in April 1571. He surrendered his lands to the queen and obtained permission to go to England to solicit their restoration, but, owing to the rebellion of the Earl of Clanricarde's sons, his presence was required in Ireland. He won the approval of the lord deputy and council, and a warrant was apparently given in June 1573 for the restoration of his lands. In December 1575 he went to Cork to show his respect to the lord-deputy, Sir Henry Sidney, whom he attended to Limerick and Galway, whither the principal men of Thomond repaired to him. "And finding that the mutuall Hurtes and Revenges donne betwixt the Earle and Teige MacMurrough Avas one great Cawse of the Ruyne of the Country", Sidney "bounde theim by Bondes, in great sommes", to surrender their lands, and to submit to the appointment of Donnell, created Sir Donnell O'Brien, as sheriff of the newly constituted county of Clare. This arrangement, though acquiesced in, was naturally displeasing to Thomond, and he was reputed to have said that he repented ever "condescending to the queen's mercy".

The arrangement did not put an end to the disputes between him and Teige, and in 1577 Sir William Drury was compelled to place the county under martial government. Thomond thereupon travelled to England, and on 7 October warrant was given a new patent containing the full effect of his former patent, with remainder to his son Donough, baron of Ibrickan. He returned to Ireland about Christmas; but before his arrival, according to the "Four Masters", "the marshal had imposed a severe burden on his people, so that they were obliged to become tributary to the sovereign, and pay a sum of ten pounds for every barony, and this was the first tribute ever paid by the Dal Cais". Thomond, however, seems to have lived on good terms with the new president of Connaught, Sir Nicholas Malby.

== Death and timeline ==
Thomond died early in 1581 aged 45 and was buried at Ennis Friary. He was succeeded by his eldest son, Donough, baron of Ibrickan and 4th earl of Thomond.

Timeline
Age	Date	Event
0	1535	Born
11	1547, 28 Jan	Accession of Edward VI, succeeding Henry VIII of England
15	1550, 4 Aug	Anthony St Leger, appointed Lord Deputy of Ireland (2nd term)
17	1553, 1 Apr	Succeeds as 2nd earl, but his uncle Donnell usurps the earldom
18	1553, 6 Jul	Accession of Queen Mary I, succeeding Edward VI of England
18	1553, 1 Sep	Anthony St Leger, appointed Lord Deputy of Ireland (3nd term)
20	1556, 27 Apr	Thomas Radcliffe, 3rd Earl of Sussex, appointed Lord Deputy of Ireland
22–23	1558	Uncles Donnell, Teige, and Donough declared traitors by Lord Deputy Radcliffe
23	1558, 17 Nov	Accession of Queen Elizabeth I, succeeding Queen Mary I
23–24	1559	Married his 1st wife, Evelyn, widow of James FitzGerald, 13th Earl of Desmond
23–24	1559	Lost the Battle of Spancel Hill against Donnell
29	1565, 8 Feb	Battle of Affane, won by the Butlers over Gerald FitzGerald, 14th Earl of Desmond.
30	1565, 13 Oct	Henry Sidney, appointed Lord Deputy of Ireland
45	1581, early in	Died aged 45 and was buried at Ennis Friary

== Notes and references ==
=== Sources ===
- Brady, Ciaran (2002) [1st pub. 1996]. The Chief Governors: The Rise and Fall of Reform Government in Tudor Ireland 1536–1588. Cambridge: Cambridge University Press. ISBN 0-521-46176-6.
- Brewer, John Sherren; Bullen, William, eds. (1867). Calendar of the Carew Manuscripts Preserved in the Archiepiscopal Library at Lambeth 1515–1574. London: Longmans, Green, Reader, & Dyer. OCLC 906123913.
- Burke, Bernard (1883). A Genealogical History of the Dormant, Abeyant, Forfeited and Extinct Peerages of the British Empire (New ed.). London: Harrison. OCLC 499232768. – (for Thomond)
- Cokayne, George Edward (1896). Complete Peerage of England, Scotland, Ireland, Great Britain and the United Kingdom, Extant, Extinct, or Dormant. Vol. VII (1st ed.). London: George Bell and Sons. OCLC 1180891114. – S to T (for Thomond)
- Cokayne, George Edward (1913). Gibbs, Vicary (ed.). The complete peerage of England, Scotland, Ireland, Great Britain and the United Kingdom, extant, extinct, or dormant. Vol. III (2nd ed.). London: St Catherine Press. OCLC 228661424. – Canonteign to Cutts (for Clancarty & Clare)
- Cunningham, Bernadette (October 2009). "O'Brien, Conor". Dictionary of Irish Biography.
- Debrett, John (1828). Peerage of the United Kingdom of Great Britain and Ireland. Vol. II (17th ed.). London: F. C. and J. Rivington. OCLC 54499602. – Scotland and Ireland
- Dunlop, Robert (1895). "O'Brien, Conor, third Earl of Thomond (1534?–1581)". In Lee, Sidney (ed.). Dictionary of National Biography. Vol. XLI. New York: MacMillan and Co. pp. 309–310. OCLC 8544105.
- Fryde, E. B.; Greenway, D. E.; Porter, S.; Roy, I., eds. (1986). Handbook of British Chronology. Royal Historical Society Guides and Handbooks, No. 2 (3rd ed.). London: Offices of the Royal Historical Society. ISBN 0-86193-106-8. – (for timeline)
- Maginn, Christopher (2004). "O'Brien, Conor, third earl of Thomond (1635?–1581)". In Matthew, Colin; Harrison, Brian (eds.). Oxford Dictionary of National Biography. Vol. 41. New York: Oxford University Press. pp. 356–357. ISBN 0-19-861391-1.
- McGurk, J. J. N. (2004). "FitzGerald, Gerald fitz James, fourteenth earl of Desmond (c. 1533–1583)". In Matthew, Colin; Harrison, Brian (eds.). Oxford Dictionary of National Biography. Vol. 19. New York: Oxford University Press. pp. 809–811. ISBN 0-19-861369-5.

Peerage of Ireland
Preceded by Donough O'Brien	Earl of Thomond; 1535–1581	Succeeded by Donogh O'Brien
