= Conchobhar mac Toirdhealbaig Ó Briain =

King of Thomond

Connor O'Brien, King of Thomond

King of Thomond
- Reign: 1528-1540
- Predecessor: Toirdelbhach Donn MacTadhg Ó Briain
- Successor: Murrough O'Brien
- Died: 1540
- Spouses: Anabella Burke; Ellice née Baccagh
- Issue: Donough O'Brien, 2nd Earl of Thomond; Sir Donald O'Brien; Sir Turlogh O'Brien; Teige O'Brien; Murrough O'Brien; Mortogh O'Brien
- House: Ua Briain
- Father: Toirdhealbhach Donn Ó Briain
- Mother: Raghnait MacNamara

Connor O'Brien, King of Thomond (Irish: Conchobhar Ó Briain; fl. 1528 until his death in 1540) was the second to last King of Thomond.

== Biography ==
Connor was born the eldest surviving son of Toirdhealbhach Donn Ó Briain inaugurated King of Thomond in 1498 (and grandson of Teige-an-Chomhaid), and Raghnait, daughter of John MacNamara chief of the MacNamara clan.

In 1528, on the death of his father Connor was inaugurated King of Thomond and having reigned for 12 years he died in 1540. His eldest son Donough was a minor when his father died and Connor's brother Murrough gained the estates and title of King of Thomond under tanistry, or popular election (then in general use, but abolished by King James in 1605) whereby the estate and title were to descend, for life, to the eldest and worthiest man of the blood and name of him that died last.

Both parties appealed to Henry VIII and it was agreed that Murrough would become the 1st Earl of Thomond and upon his death the title would pass to Donough, on condition that both men recognised Henry as their lawful king, that they would give up their claims to be King of Thomond and that they would become Anglican. This arrangement was agreed, and with the death of Murrough the title of Earl passed to Donough. However, on the death of Donough in 1551, the rights of his son, Connor, 3rd Earl of Thomond, to the title and estates was challenged by Donnell, his uncle and a brother of his father, who was inaugurated O'Brien and chief of the Dal Cais. Donnell appealed to Queen Mary (a Roman Catholic) to uphold his usurpation. After many years of family and civil strife Connor secured his position and lands in the late 1570s during the reign of Queen Elizabeth.

== Family ==
Connor married Anabella, youngest daughter of Ulick De Burgh, (the red) of Clanrickard. They had two children:

- Donough, (the Fat) his heir;
- Sir Donnell

Connor's second wife was Ellice, daughter of Maurice née Baccagh, Earl of Desmond. They had four sons:

- Sir Turlogh, took possession of the lordship of Ibrackan, and dying soon after, had two sons, who died childless);
- Teige, held the lordship of Ibrackan after his brother's death, until his half brother Sir Donald and he were expelled. His inheritance was Ballynocorrig, and he gave rise to the family of that place; having also a daughter Amory, married to Shane, knight of Kerry;
- Murrough of Cahironenane, whose son Dermod died young;
- Mortogh of Dromtyne, whose two sons left no issue.

== See also ==
- Thomond
