= Donnchadh Cairbreach Ó Briain =

King of Thomond

- King of Thomond
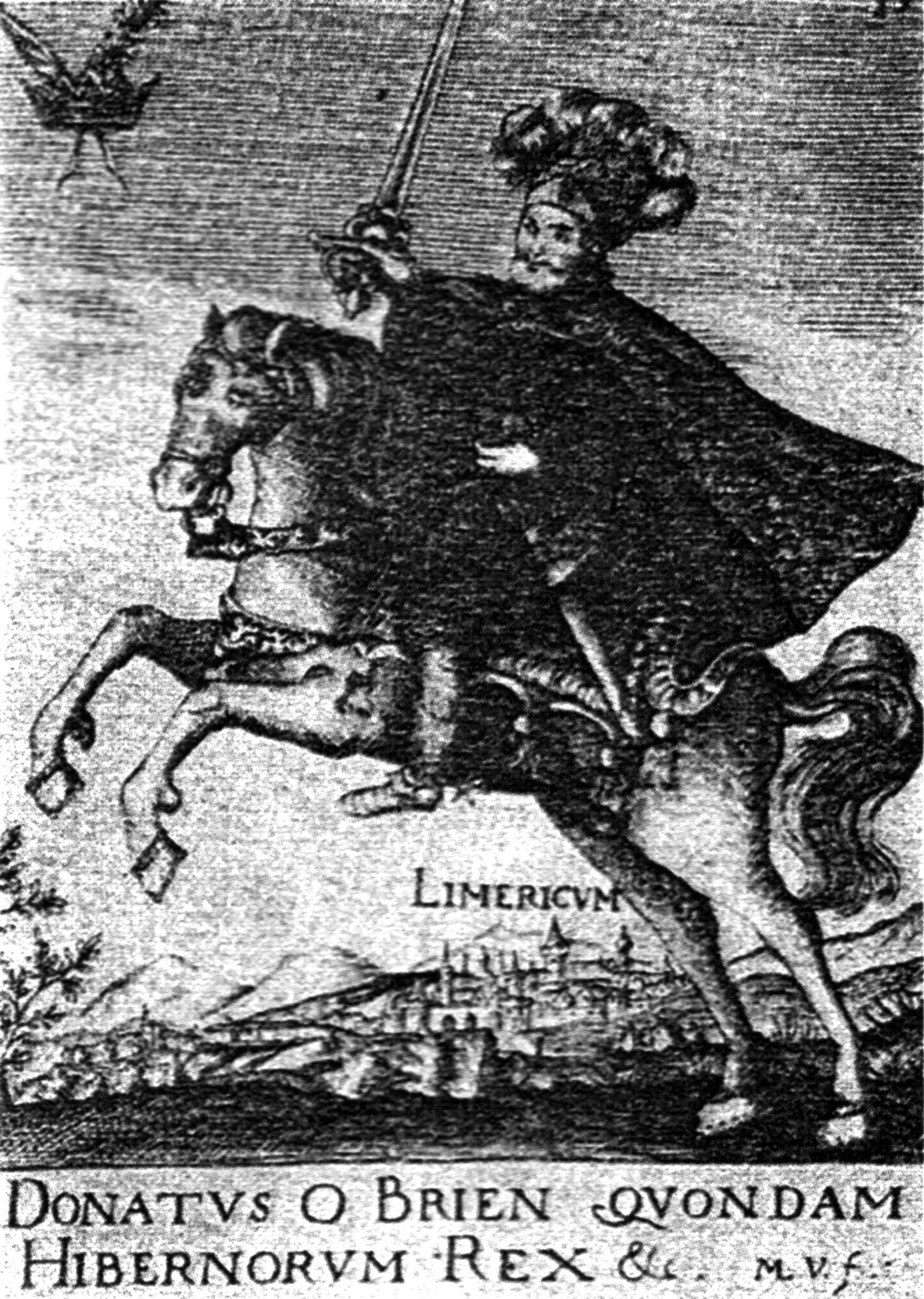
- Reign: 1198–1242
- Predecessor: Conchobar Ua Briain
- Successor: Muirchertach Ua Briain
- Died: 1242
- Spouse: Sadhbh Ní Chinnéidigh
- Father: Domnall Mór Ua Briain
- Mother: Órlaith Ní Murchadha

Donnchadh Cairbreach Ó Briain was King of Thomond from 1198 to his death in 1242. He founded Moor Abbey (Galbally) early in the 13th century before it was re-founded in 1471 and established by the first Franciscan pontiff under the reign of Sixtus IV, a religious order founded by Saint Francis of Assisi.

== Reign ==
He was one of the three sons of Domnall Mór Ua Briain. His father died in 1198 and his brother Muircheartach Dall was blinded by the Normans, his other brother Conchobhar Ruadh was killed in 1198 and Donnchadh began his reign. He founded Ennis Friary in the 1210s as penance for the struggle with his brother Muircheartach Finn Ó Briain. The MacConmara and Ó Cuinn clans revolted against him and he defeated the revolt with the help of his brother-in-law de Burgh and other Normans. In return he granted Limerick and lands in Tipperary and (modern) County Limerick to the Normans, reducing Thomond to the area of the modern-day County Clare, protected from further incursions by the River Shannon.

== Family ==
He married Sadhbh Ua Cinnéidigh and had six known children:

- Conchobhar na Siudane
- Toirdhealbhach
- Muircheartach
- Diarmaid
- Tadhg Dall
- Sláine - Abbess of Killowen
