= Donnell O'Brien =

Donnell O'Brien may refer to

- Domnall Mór Ua Briain (?–1194), king of Thomond, king of Munster, king of Limerick, 1168-1194
- Domhnall mac Conchobair Ó Briain (?–1579), claimed the title of Earl of Thomond in 1553
