= Turlough O'Brien (disambiguation) =

Turlough O'Brien is a Gaelic football manager. He managed Carlow between 2014 and 2020. It may also refer to:

- Turlough O'Brien, High King of Ireland (1009 – 14 July 1086)
- Turlough O'Brien, Lord of Thomond (died 1551)
- Toirdhealbhach Ó Briain, stylised in English as Turlough O'Brien (died 1569) — a bishop in Ireland during the second half of the sixteenth century
