= Namara =

Namara is a surname. Notable people with the surname include:

- Grace Namara (fl. 2010), Ugandan politician
- Evelyn Namara (fl. 2006), Ugandan corporate executive
- Marguerite Namara (1888–1974), American actress and singer
- Stephen Namara (born 1953), American artist

== See also ==
- Namara inscription
- MacNamara
