= Thomond deeds =

- Trinity College Library
- Also known as: Ancient Irish Deeds and Writings, Chiefly Relating to Landed Property, from the Twelfth to the Seventeenth Century, with Translations, Notes, and a Preliminary Essay
- Date: 12th century — 1619
- Place of origin: Ireland
- Language(s): Middle Irish, Early Modern Irish

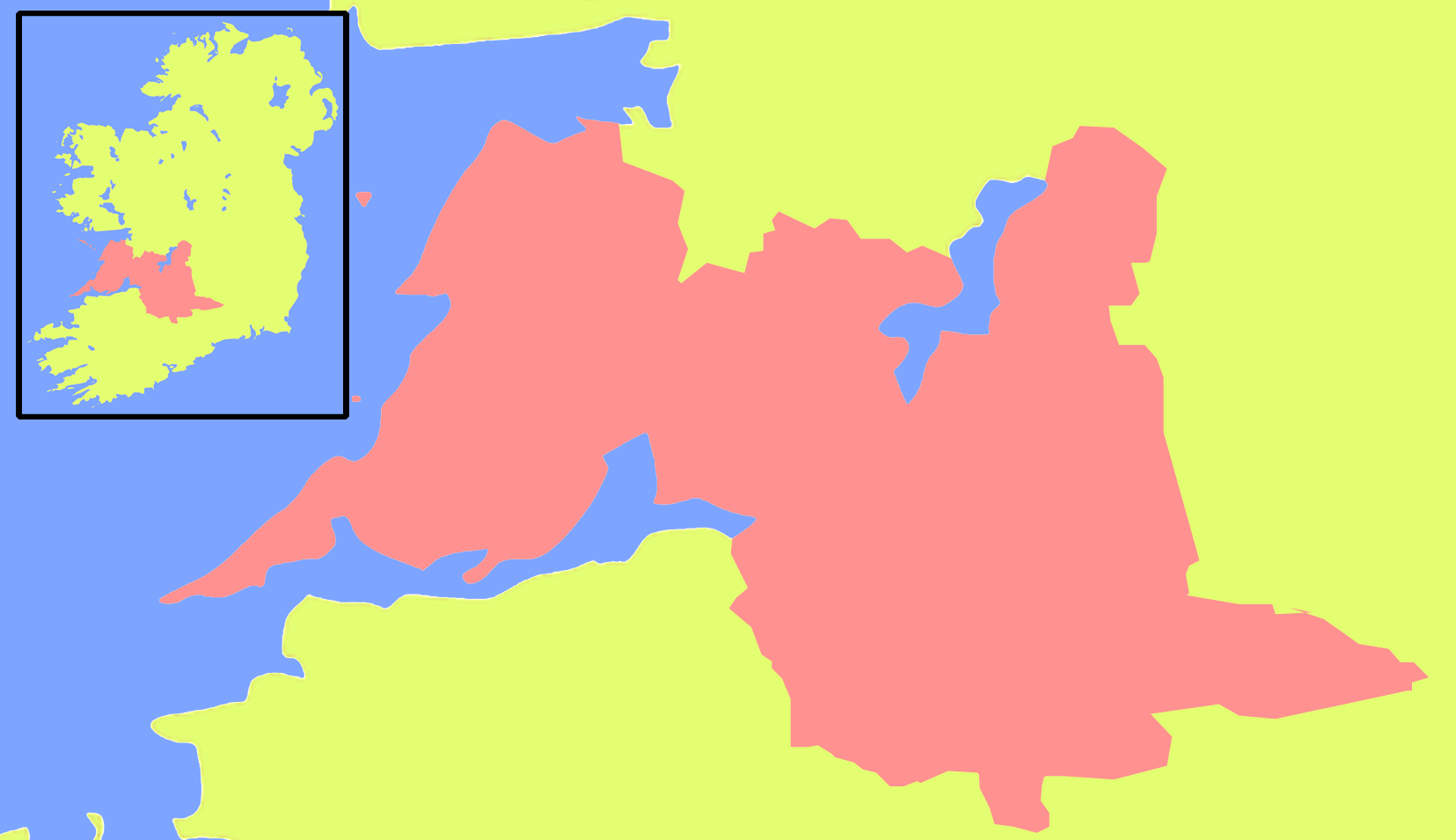
Location of the Kingdom of Thomond

The Thomond deeds are Irish deeds relating to lands and property in Thomond, County Clare, preserved in the Library of Trinity College, Dublin. The collection, written in Irish and mainly consisting of "deeds and instruments related to property", has undated documents from the 12th through the 14th centuries; for the most part, however, the documents are dated, between 1419 and 1619. It provides an important background for later legal writing in Ireland.

Hardiman, 1826, says of these deeds

The abolition of the ancient tenures of Ireland, ... during the sixteenth and seventeenth centuries, rendered deeds and writings in the Irish language, ... in a great degree useless. Other combining circumstances, but chiefly the policy and care of successive English grantees to destroy all evidence of previous rights and possession of the natives, caused those domestic documents to become so scarce, that the few which escaped the general wreck are, at the present day, esteemed valuable rarities, ...

== Notes ==
=== Reference bibliography ===
- Hardiman, James; Thomond, Conor; Grace, Edmund; O'Daly, Donogh; O'Davoren, Hugh; O'Finne, Hugh; O'Davoren, Nehemias; Mac Gernasdir, Donald (1826). Hardiman, James (ed.). "Ancient Irish Deeds and writings, chiefly relating to landed property, from the twelfth to the seventeenth century; with translations, notes and a preliminary essay". Transactions of the Royal Irish Academy. XV: 1–95. JSTOR 30078910.
- Russell, C. W. (1866–1869). "On the "Duties upon Irishmen" in the Kildare Rental Book, as Illustrated by the Mac Rannall Agreement". Proceedings of the Royal Irish Academy. 10: 490–96. JSTOR 20489010.
