= Ennis Friary =

Franciscan friary in County Clare, Ireland

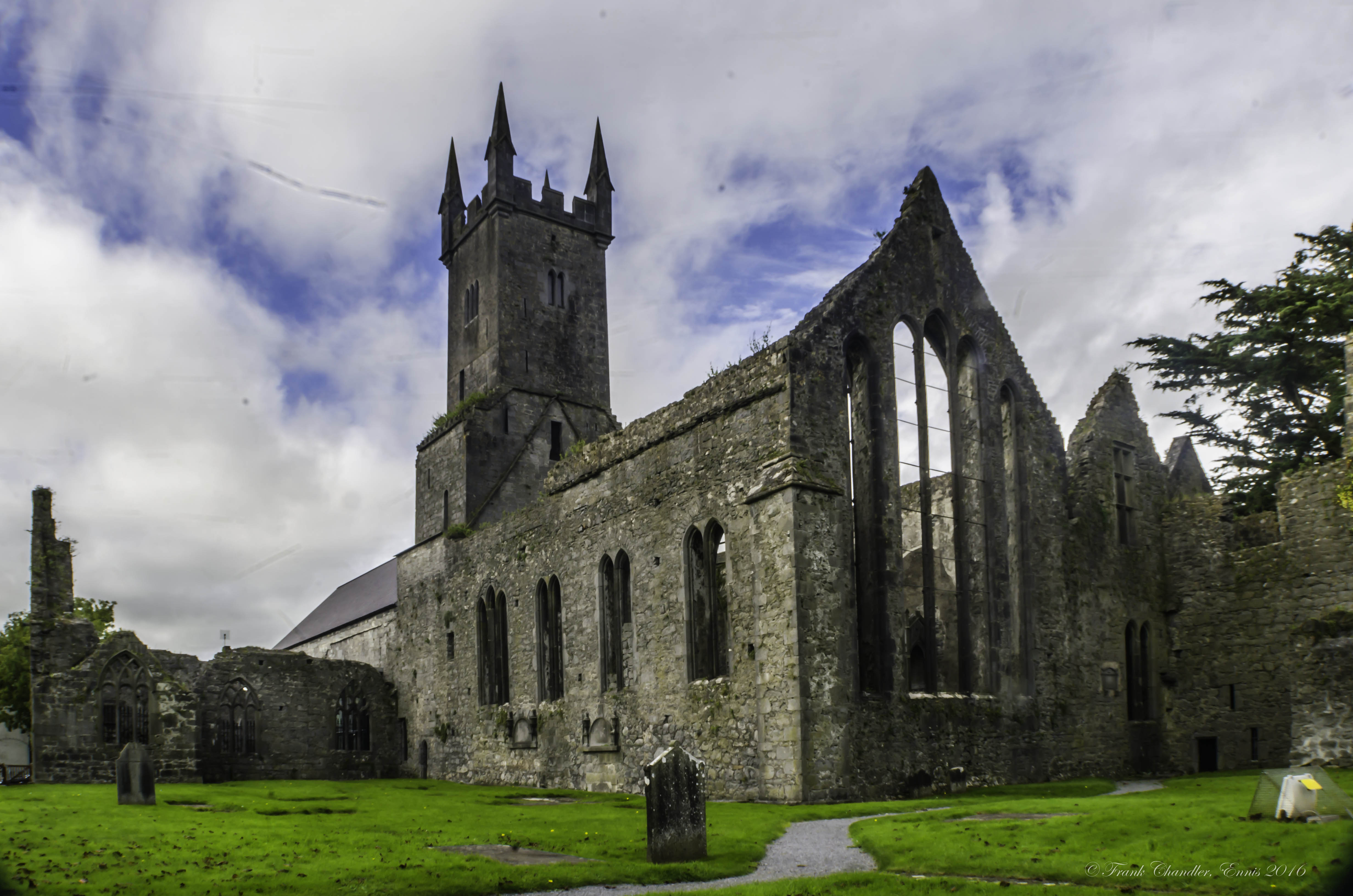

- Location within Ireland

Monastery information
- Order: Franciscans
- Established: mid-13th century
- Disestablished: formally suppressed in 1543 interrupted in practice 1697 new friary still functional

People
- Founder: Donnchadh Cairbreach Ó Briain (Dermot O'Brian)

Architecture
- Heritage designation: National Monument

Site
- Location: Abbey Street, Ennis
- Coordinates: 52.846°N 8.981°W
- Public access: yes

National monument of Ireland
- Official name: Ennis Friary
- Reference no.: 170

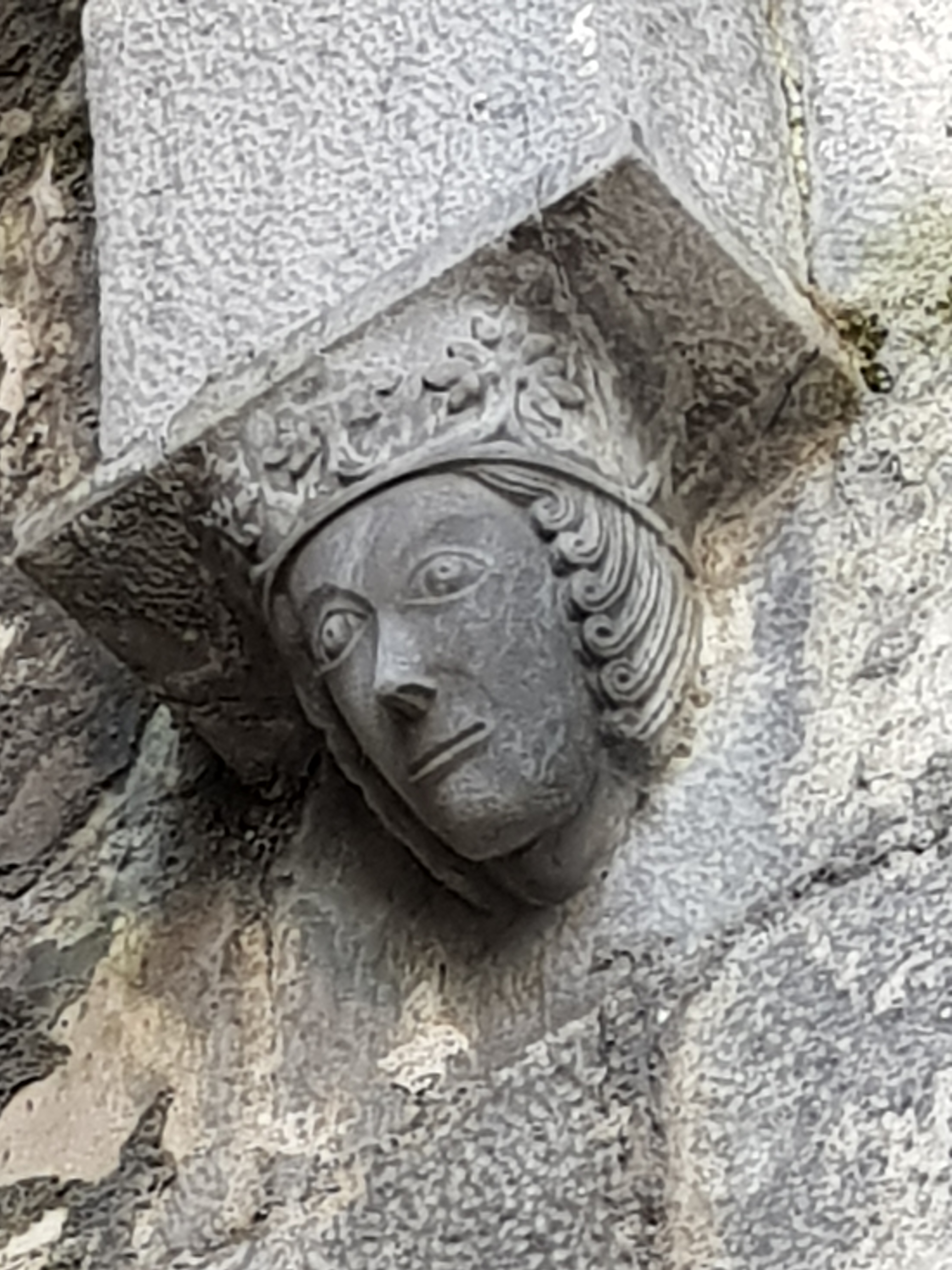
Effigy of a King in Ennis Friary. It sits under an arch opposite an effigy of a bishop on the other side of the arch. c. 1450-1470

Ennis Friary (Irish: Mainistir na hInse; colloquially also known as Ennis Abbey) was a Franciscan friary in the town of Ennis, County Clare, Ireland. It was established in the middle of the 13th century by the ruling O'Brien dynasty who supported it for most of its existence. Following the suppression of the monasteries in the 16th century, the friary continued to function for a while despite the loss of its lands. In the early 17th century, the buildings were handed over to the Church of Ireland as a place of worship. It was used as such until the late 19th century. After the construction of a new Church of Ireland building, the friary fell into ruin. Managed by the Office of Public Works since the late 19th century, it was formally returned to the Franciscan Order in 1969.

Today the friary remains in a ruined state but is open to the public. It is a National Monument of Ireland. The Franciscan friars have moved their community to a new friary and place of worship, the Gothic Revival Church of the Immaculate Conception, nearby.

== Location ==
The old Ennis Friary is located on Abbey Street near the river Fergus in Ennis.

== History ==
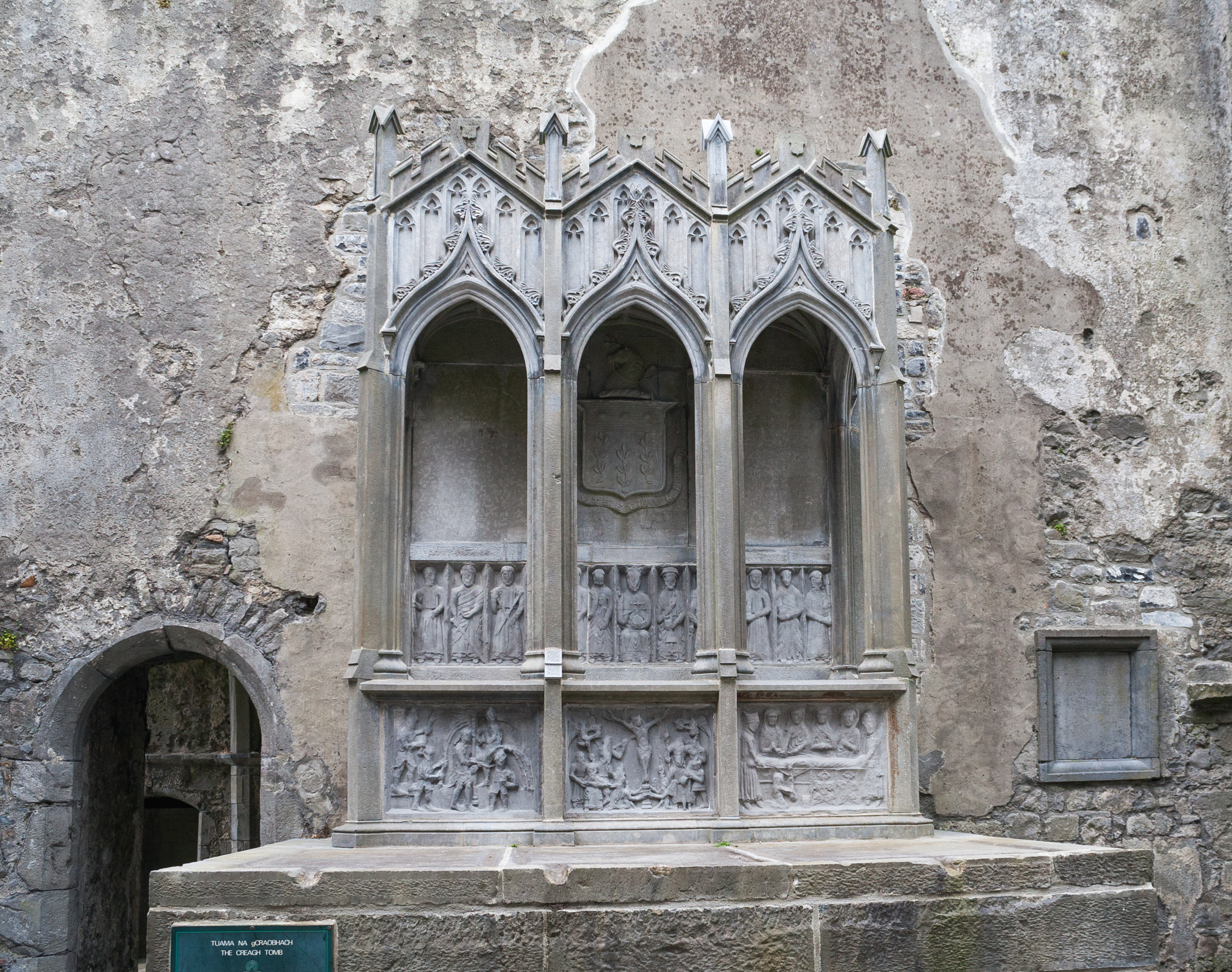
19th-century Creagh family tomb, using 15th-century reliefs from older tombs

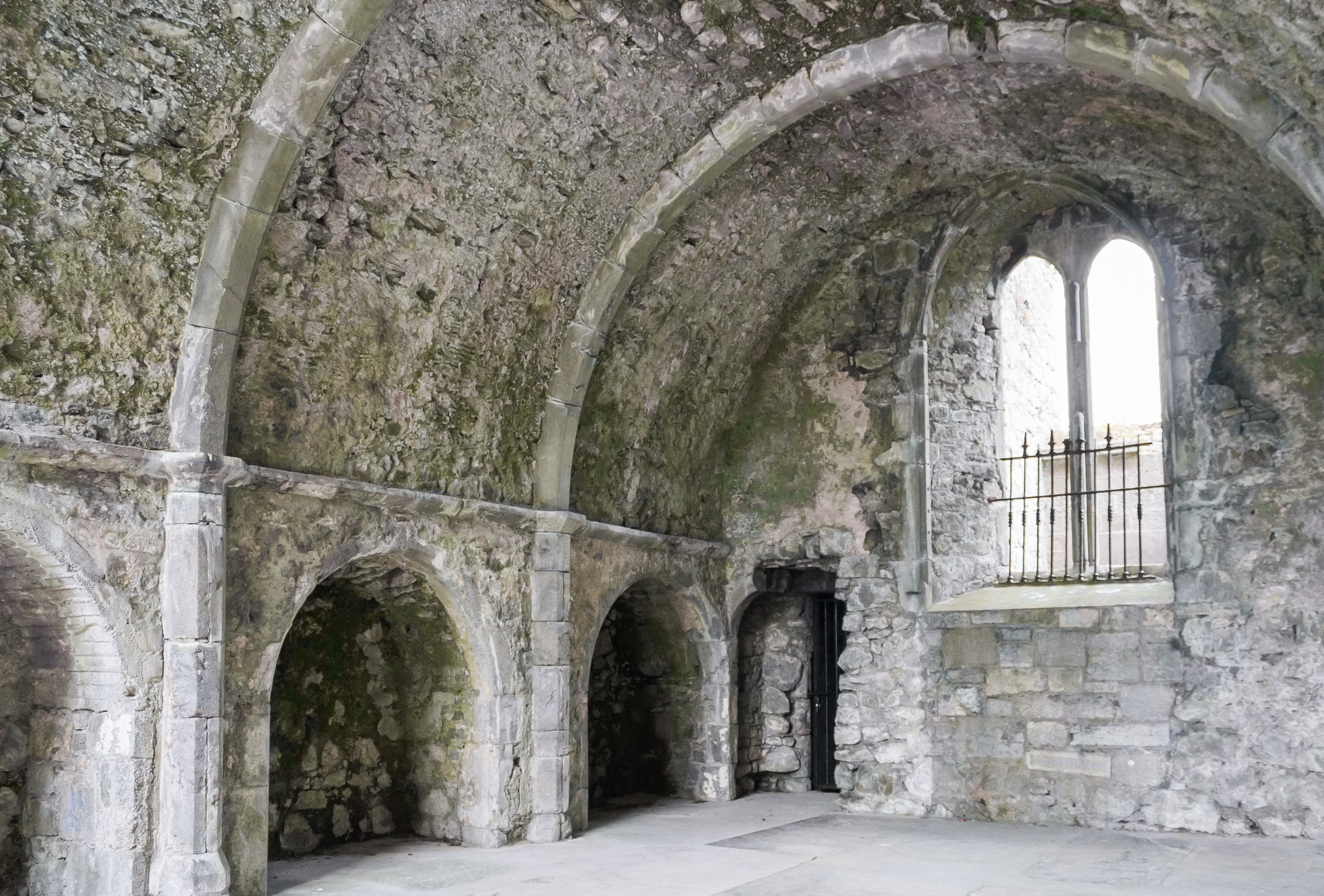
Sacristy, used as a courtroom for the assizes after the Reformation

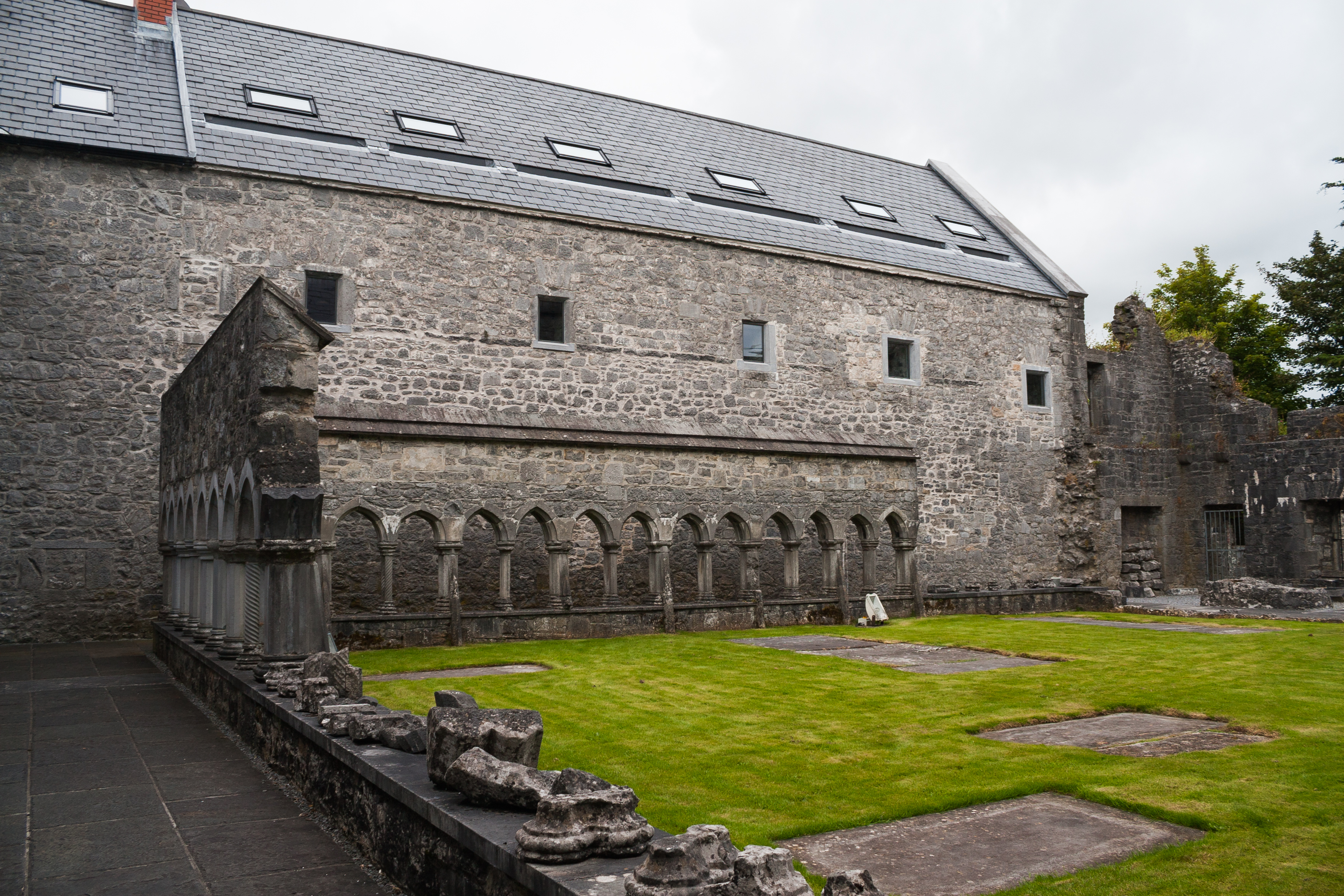
Cloister and range, northwest corner

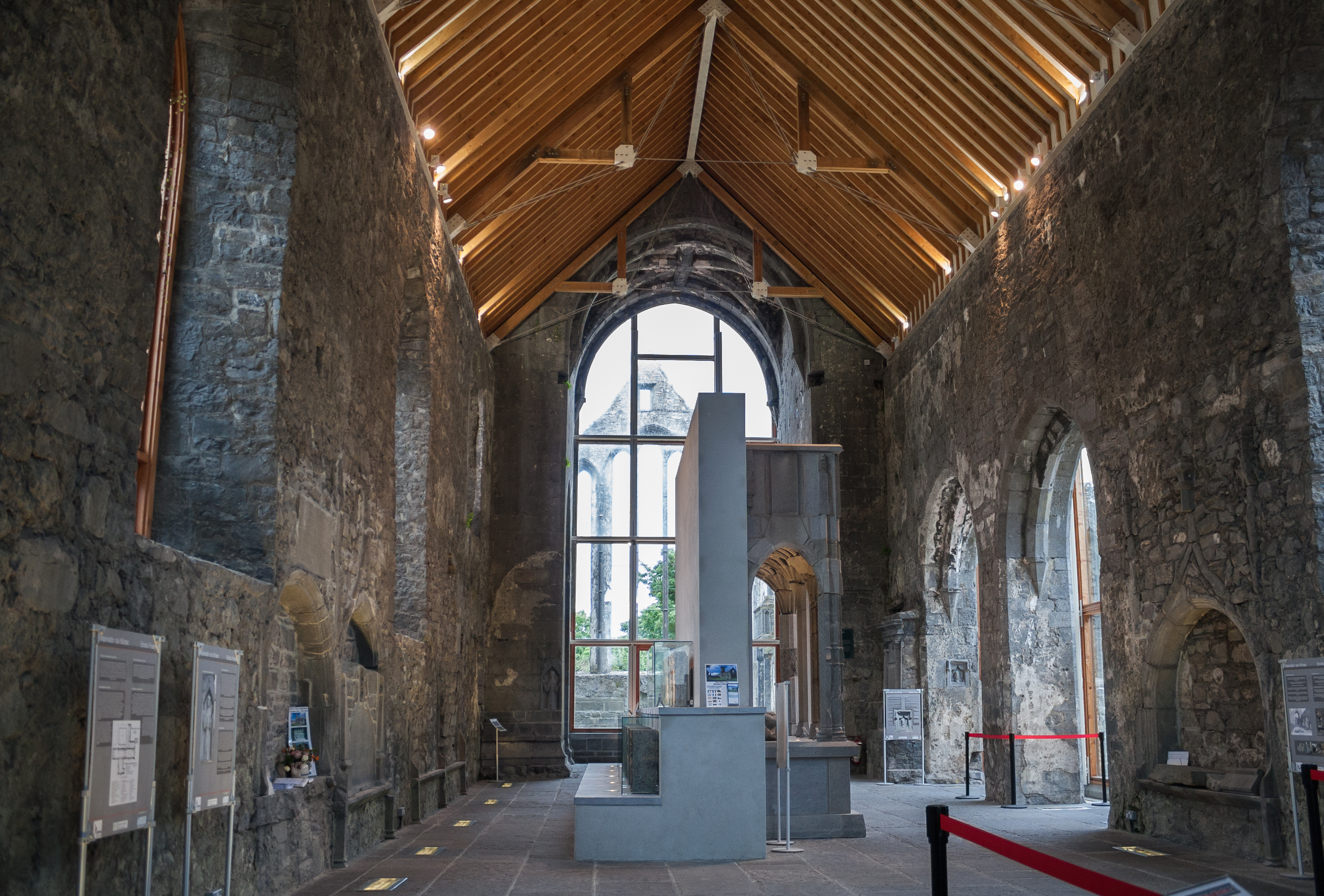
Newly roofed nave with exhibit

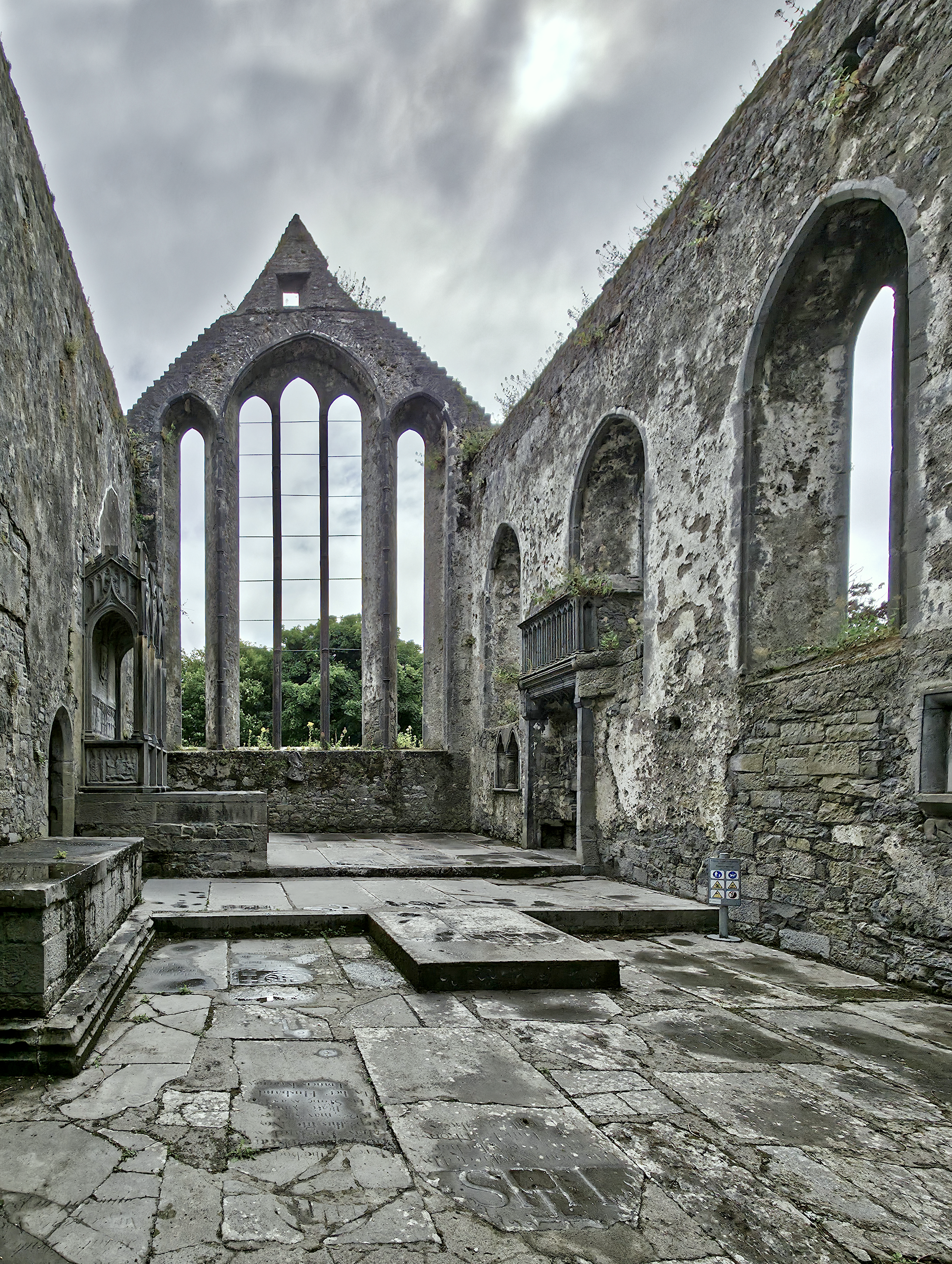
Lancet windows set in embrasure

Donnchadh Cairbreach Ó Briain (Dermot O'Brian), son of Domnall Mór Ua Briain, High King of Ireland, became King of Thomond in the 1200s after a bloody feud with his brother, Muircheartach Finn Ó Briain. Reportedly in order to do penance, he decided to build a friary on an island in the River Fergus called Cluain Rámhfhada (meadow of the long rowing), which may have been the site of an earlier church. After the Normans occupied Limerick, Donnchadh submitted to King John and moved his seat of power to Cluain Rámhfhada (Ennis) in 1216. He is reported to have "offered shelter" to the Franciscan Order in Ennis in 1241/2.

Donnchadh financed three monasteries: he rebuilt the Cistercian abbey at Inislounaght (Tipperary), built a house for the Dominicans at Limerick and a Franciscan friary at Ennis, which would also serve as the family place of burial. Donnchadh died in 1244. He was buried at the Dominican house at Limerick, suggesting that the friary at Ennis was not yet close to being finished at that point.

In 1276 King Edward I granted the Kingdom of Thomond to his grandson, Thomas de Clare. Toirdelbach Ó Briain (Turlough O'Brian) refused to relinquish control of his land, however. In 1277, Brian Ruadh Ó Briain of Bunratty was assassinated and Turlough became King of Thomond. He fought a war against de Clare, finally defeating him in 1287. That year and again in the year of his death, 1306, Turlough gifted bells, crucifixes and blue-stained glass to the friary. Turlough's sons, Muircheartach Ó Briain (King 1311-43) and Donnchadh mac Toirdelbach Ó Briain (Prince, 1306–11) were both buried at the friary.

Apart from support from the ruler, the friary could only rely on the charity of the local population as it owned no land or other economic resources at that time. The earliest buildings thus were likely much smaller than the extant ruins. The friary was the only source of education for the people of the region around Ennis.

In 1314, Maccon Caech MacNamara added a sacristy and refectory to the friary. He died of the plague in 1347 and was buried at the friary. It continued to prosper and in 1350 a Papal Indulgence was granted to Ennis for the feasts of St. Francis and St. Anthony. In 1375, Richard of Windsor granted the friars permission to travel beyond Thomond in search of funds. That year the chronicles also mention a "school" at Ennis for the first time.

The Franciscan community grew well into the 15th century. In 1400 the cloister and transept were added. In 1475 the belfry tower followed. In 1507, the order's Provincial Chapter was held at Ennis.

In 1537, Henry VIII ordered the suppression of all the monasteries in his kingdom. In 1543, Murrough O'Brien surrendered to the Lord Deputy, Anthony St Leger. Renouncing the title of king, he became the first Earl of Thomond. He received the properties of Corcomroe Abbey and Clare Abbey. Donough O'Brien, Murrough's nephew, received Quin Abbey. Ennis Friary was granted to John Neillan (or Neylan). Murrough died in 1543 and that was also the last time the Provincial Chapter was held at Ennis. Despite the official suppression, however, the Franciscans held on. Although the O'Briens probably took possession of some of the friars' lands they also continued to support them. The order was able to operate openly at Ennis until 1570 and in secret thereafter.

The Desmond Rebellions unsettled the area after 1569 and in 1570 Edward Fitton held the assizes in Ennis Friary itself, having been forbidden to do so a year earlier by Connor O'Brien.

Connor died in 1581 and was buried in the friary. However, his successor was his son Donogh who had been raised at the court of Elizabeth I. He was fond neither of the old Gaelic ways nor of the Franciscans. Returning to Clare he declared himself an Anglican and worked closely with the English authorities. In 1585, he became a member of the parliament called by John Perrot and he supported Richard Bingham, when he set a fixed tax of 10 shillings per quarter acre. In 1588, Donogh O'Brien became a member of the Council of Connaught and at that point received considerable income from the properties of the former Franciscan houses of Ennis and Quin.

During the Nine Years' War, Donogh sided with the crown against the rebels. In the early 17th century, he asked the Church of Ireland to take over Ennis Friary as a place of worship. One friar, who had returned from Spain to Ennis, was captured but declared insane by Donogh, as he was a member of the Broudin family, who served as the biographers of the O'Briens. This allowed the "insane" friar to say mass in his room in the friary until his death in 1617.

In 1628, the friary was reestablished during the rule of Charles I of England but under the Commonwealth of England was suppressed again in 1651. During that time Mícheál Ó Cléirigh visited the friary in 1643. Thaddeus Gorman became First Guardian of the friary in 1638. His successor, Eugene O'Cahan, was executed in 1652.

A Provincial Chapter was not held until 1666 and following the passing of the Penal Laws Laurence Considine led the friars into exile in 1697, thus formally terminating the presence of the order at Ennis Friary. The building itself and its land had come into the possession of John Gore, a former Cromwellian officer.

Religious worship at the old friary ended in 1871, when the Church of Ireland build a new church in Bindon Street, as the upkeep of the old structure had become too expensive. The nave was covered by a roof until 1887, but by 1893 all the interior was fully exposed to rain and wind.

In 1892, the Commissioners of Public Works took control. Despite some repair the friary remained closed until 1952 when the Office of Public Works did some major work. The Franciscans in Ennis, after having hidden outside of town for a time in the 17th and 18th century, were again living as a community in Lysaght's Lane by 1800. In 1830 they moved to Bow Lane where a new chapel was opened. In 1853 the Provincial threatened to close the friary unless conditions were improved. Thus the present site at Willow Bank House on Francis Street was bought. The first service at the new church, the Church of the Immaculate Conception, took place in 1856. A new friary was built (finished in 1877) and the church rebuilt in Gothic Revival style (c. 1885/6). Ennis was the official novitiate of the Irish province from 1876 to 1902, when Killarney Franciscan Friary became the novitiate.

The old Ennis Friary was formally returned by the Church of Ireland to the Franciscans in 1969. However, it is property of and cared for by the state.

== Description ==
The walls of the church, the Gothic bell tower and the transept chapel are still standing, as is the east range and parts of the cloister.

== Today ==
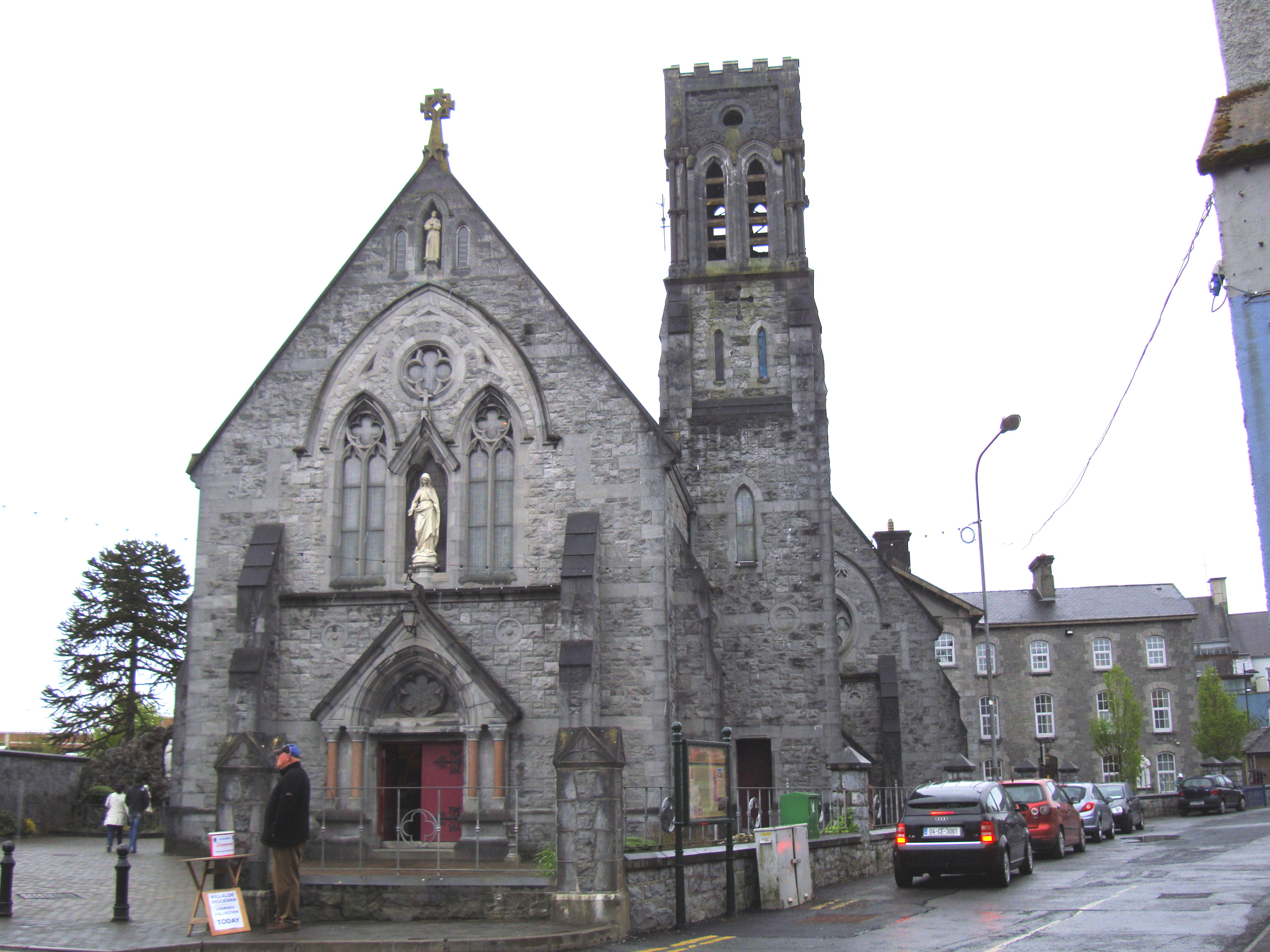
Church of the Immaculate Conception, the new friary church, built c. 1885

Since 2017, Ennis Friary is the Postulancy house for the Irish and British Provinces of the Franciscans.

The old friary is open to the public. A restaurant (The Cloister) occupies part of the range.

The nave is now roofed and used to exhibit some of the stone carvings.
