= Magh Adhair =

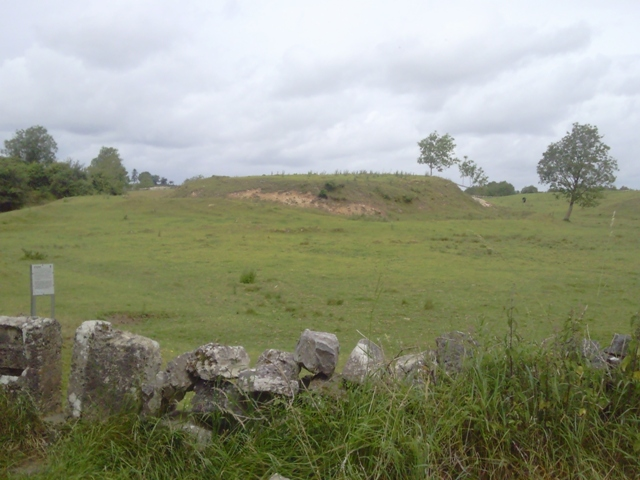
- Magh Adhair

- Location within Ireland
- 52°50′28″N 8°49′44″W
- Location: County Clare, Ireland

National monument of Ireland
- Reference no.: 224

Magh Adhair (Irish pronunciation: [ˌmˠaː ˈəiɾʲ]; "Adair's plain") is a former inauguration site and place of archaeological significance located near the village of Quin, County Clare, in Ireland. Traditionally known as the place in which the kings of Thomond were installed, most notably the O'Briens, the site itself consists of numerous monuments, including a mound, standing stone, fulacht fiadh and a bullaun stone.

== History ==
As of 2016, the site had not been excavated nor dated, so the era in which the complex was first in use is speculation, though the mound is likely to have been built anywhere from the Bronze Age to the Iron Age due to the nature of the monuments. It is likely the site has been in use over various phases, in continuation for at least 1,500 years.

It has been suggested by Irish antiquarians, including John O'Donovan and T. J. Westropp, that the name "Magh Adhair" originally signified a very large area, perhaps the entire "Clár", or plain, from which County Clare receives its name. They believed this area steadily shrunk until it referred to only the field in which the monument stands, along with an adjacent area known as "Moyross/Moyree Park". "Ree" usually stems from the word "rí" meaning a king, though in this instance may be open to interpretation.

The earliest references to the site are given in the Irish Annals - as seen in the Annals of the Four Masters —

A.D. 981: Maelseacchlainn, the son of Domhnall plundered Dal gCais and prostrated the Bile of Magh Adhair, digging its roots out of the ground.

A.D. 1051: The Tree of Magh Adhair was prostrated by Hugh O'Conor.

A "Bile" usually signifies an Irish tree of some religious or otherwise otherworldly significance, and it is evident from these excerpts that the felling of such a tree was an egregious misdeed.

It is stated in the Lecan records that Amhalghaidh Mac Fiachrach raised the mound of Magh Adhair as a tomb for himself, and so that his progeny might conduct fairs around his mound, and his heirs be inaugurated there. Fair gatherings or "irachts" were noted to have taken place as late as the 19th century, the last known fair to have been in 1838, but possibly to have been still conducted as late as the Great Famine. It is stated, in both Frost's History and Topography of the County of Clare and in O'Donovan & O'Curry's ordnance survey letters of 1839, that the mound received its name from a chieftain of the Fir Bolg, Adhair, (Aed) the son of Umor and brother of Aengus, who was reputedly responsible for building the cliff-fort of Dun Aengus on the Aran Islands. According to the Book of Invasions and later mythological traditions, the Fir Bolg were driven into Connaught after being defeated by the Tuatha Dé Danann - Clare, being west of the Shannon, was deemed part of Connaught at this time, and therefore the residence of a Fir Bolg colony. Once Clare was colonised by the Gaelic Milesians, sometime between the late Iron Age and the coming of Christianity in the 5th Century, (it has been suggested sometime circa 100AD) Magh Adhair became the ceremonial consecration ground of the Kings of Thomond for the North Munster peoples known as the Dal gCais.

Entries and poems for several O'Brien inaugurations (1242, 1267, 1277 and 1311) at Magh Adhair are found in the Caithreim Thoirdhealbhaigh, an account of the conflict between the Anglo-Norman insurgents and Gaelic nobility of Thomond in the 13th and 14th centuries, such held for the De Clare candidate of Clan Brian in 1311 —

His chiefs assembled around Dermot, the son of Donogh, who was son of Brian Roe O'Brien at Moy Eyre to invest him with the chieftainship, and the tower-like hero was solemnly inaugurated. It was Loghlin, the son of Cumee, who first installed him and the states (tribes) unanimously consented. As the bard of Dermot declared on the occasion:-

Let us give the title of King,
(which will be of much fame
To the land which has chosen him)
To the valorous griffin
The son of the fair-formed Donogh
Of the sealed secrets
Generous heir of generous Blood*
The puissant Donogh of fortresses.
He is kind to the church,
He is head over all,
The heart of the territories,
A tree under blossom.
Dermot of Dun Mor
The mild, lively, fierce,
Received the hostages
Through his wisdom and sword
His gracious smile and pomp
He exhibits with grace
And since he has commenced his career
His fame has spread afar
Momonia of Bards
Is his principality
Proclaim we him King
Of his tribes with great joy.

- Blood refers to the Uí mBloid sept of Thomond, an umbrella term used for much of the tribes of east Clare, especially those of the Slieve Aughty and Slieve Bearnagh mountains.

This text also reports that in the same year Murtagh O’Brien, the son of Turlogh, was also inaugurated at Magh-Adhair by the legitimist Loughlin Mac Namara, in opposition to Dermot O’Brien.

The site, though having a predominantly O'Brien connection, has traditionally been in the territory of the O'Hehirs, who were later ousted by the MacNamaras. The mound has also been named "Cregnakeeroge" - A "Ciaróg" usually signifies an insect, specifically a beetle.

== Features ==
The mound itself is of an irregular ovular shape, much degraded by the presence of cattle. Surrounded by a fosse, there is a bridging point to the central flat platform at the western side of the mound. Adjacent to this, to the west, is a satellite mound or cairn, notably stonier and smaller in its dimensions than the central structure, the latter of which is made largely of soil. To the north of the mound lies a bullaun stone, containing two depressions which fill with water fed by rainfall. North and west of this are a series of enclosures and what is described as the site of a battle taking place in 877 AD, according to the ordnance survey map. Bordering the entire site to the west is the Hell river, and past that again, a standing stone, referred to as a "ligaun". The central site is situated at the base of an amphitheatre of low hills, prone to flooding from the river. To the east of the site is a turlough and fulacht fiadh. The area in which the site is located is renowned for one rich in the presence of ringforts, the largest of which being the nearby triple-ringed fort of Cahercalla.
