= Dermod O'Brien, 2nd Baron Inchiquin =

Dermod McMurrough O'Brien (died 1 May 1557) was the 2nd Baron Inchiquin. He was the son of Murrough O'Brien, 1st Earl of Thomond (last king) and Eleanor FitzGerald. O'Brien married Margaret O'Brien, daughter of Donough O'Brien, 2nd Earl of Thomond (a nephew of Murrough O'Brien, 1st Earl of Thomond).

He died at Ennis Abbey in 1557. The title passed to his son Murrough McDermot O'Brien, 3rd Baron Inchiquin.

Peerage of Ireland
Preceded by Murrough O'Brien	Baron Inchiquin; 1551–1557	Succeeded by Murrough O'Brien
