= Jack Hehir =

Irish footballer

Jack Hehir was an Irish soccer player during the first two decades of the 20th century.

Hehir kept goal for the amateur Bohemians during the early century, winning Leinster Senior Cup medals along the way. However his greatest success was appearing in goal in Bohemians' 1908 Irish Cup winning team when they defeated Shelbourne after a replay. Jack played alongside the likes of Richard Hooper, Ned Brookes and Johnny McDonnell during his time at Dalymount Park.

Hehir represented Ireland once, in 1910.

== Honours ==
- Irish Cup: 1
  - Bohemians - 1908
