= Tadhg mac Murchadh Ó Briain =

Tadhg mac Murchadh Ó Briain (anglicised Teige Mac Murrough O’Brien), died 1577, was an Irish soldier and official who served as the first sheriff of Thomond between 1570 and 1571.

Ó Briain played an active political and military role during the Tudor reconquest of Ireland. He was a son of Murrough O'Brien, 1st Earl of Thomond and Eleanor fitz John. Ó Briain had four children:

- Honora Ní Briain
- Toirdhealbhach Ó Briain
- Slany Ní Brien
- Amy Ní Brien
