= Toirdhealbhach Donn Ó Briain =

King of Thomond

Turlough O'Brien or Toirdhealbhach Donn Ó Briain was Lord of Thomond from 1499 to his death in 1528 and Chief of Clan O'Brien.

== Reign ==
Ó Briain, the son of Tadhg an Chomhaid Ó Briain, took over after the death of his uncle, Toirdhealbhach Óg Ó Briain.

In 1504, he supported Ulick Fionn Burke against Gerald FitzGerald at the Battle of Knockdoe and was defeated. In 1510, he defeated the forces of Gerald FitzGerald, who was invading Thomond with a large army, at Moin na m-brathar, near Limerick.

Toirdhealbhach Donn Ó Briain died in 1528 and was succeeded by his son, Conchobhar.

== Family ==
Ó Briain married, firstly, Joan, daughter of Thomas Fitzmaurice, 8th Lord of Kerry. They had no known children. He married, secondly Raghnailt (died 1486), daughter of Seán mac Conmara. They had children:

- Conchobhar
- Donnchadh
- Murchadh Carrach
- Tadhg (Killed 1523, by shot of ball at Ath-an-Chamais, upon the River Suir, by Piers Ruadh Butler.)
- Diarmaid
- Margaret (married Eoghain Ó Ruairc (O'Rourkes of Dromahair))
- Sláine (married Éinri Óg mac Éinri Ó Neill, King of Tír Eoghain)
- Fionnuala (married Manus O'Donnell, King of Tír Chonaill)
