= Donough O'Brien, 2nd Earl of Thomond =

Donough O'Brien
- 2nd Earl of Thomond & Baron Ibrackan
- Born: c. 1520 (Note: Deduced from: • Minor at his father's death at 1540. (below 21) (see History of the O'Briens from Brian Boroimhe, AD. 1000 to AD. 1945, Donough O'Brien, page 61, https://archive.org/details/historyofobriens00obri/page/60/mode/2up) • Old enough to bear his own son before his death in 1553, who was politically active by 1559.)
- Died: 1 April 1553
- Noble family: Ua Briain
- Spouse: Helen Butler
- Issue: Margaret O'Brien; Connor O'Brien, 3rd Earl of Thomond; Donal O'Brien; Honora O'Brien
- Father: Connor O'Brien, King of Thomond
- Mother: Annabell Burke

Donough O'Brien, 2nd Earl of Thomond (Irish: Donnchadh Ó Briain; died 1 April 1553), also known as "the fat", was the son of Connor O'Brien, King of Thomond and Annabell Burke. He inherited the earldom from his uncle, Murrough O'Brien, by special remainder.

O'Brien married Helen Butler, daughter of Piers Butler, 8th Earl of Ormonde and Lady Margaret Fitzgerald. He died on 1 April 1553, after being attacked by his brothers at the family seat of Clonroad. O'Brien's brother Sir Donald was named king of Thomond by the Dalgais, but O'Brien's son, Connor, allied himself with the English and regained control of his lands.

Children of Donough O'Brien and Helen Butler:

- Margaret O'Brien (d. 1568) married Dermod O'Brien, 2nd Baron Inchiquin, and Richard Burke, 2nd Earl of Clanricarde
- Connor O'Brien, 3rd Earl of Thomond (c. 1534 – 1581)
- Donal or Daniel
- Honora married Teige Macnamara

== Notes ==
Peerage of Ireland
Preceded by Murrough O'Brien	Earl of Thomond; 1551–1553	Succeeded by Connor O'Brien
New creation	Baron Ibrackan; 1543–1553	Succeeded by Connor O'Brien
