= Diana O'Hehir =

American poet (1922–2021)

- Born: May 23, 1922; Lexington, Virginia, U.S.
- Died: January 19, 2021 (aged 98); San Francisco, California, U.S.
- Education: University of California, Berkeley; Johns Hopkins University (MA, PhD)
- Occupations: Writer and poet
- Spouse(s): Mel Fiske; Brendan O'Hehir

Diana Farnham O'Hehir (May 23, 1922 – January 19, 2021) was an American poet and writer of prose from northern California.

== Biography ==
She was born in Lexington in 1922, though she moved to California with her father the next year.

She taught from 1961 to 1992 at Mills College in Oakland where she was Aurelia Henry Reinhardt Professor Emerita of American Literature. She was married three times, twice to the same man, who she remarried 35 years after their divorce, after her marriage to her second husband, and their later divorce. She outlived both husbands, and died at the age of 98 in 2021, having published five novels and five collections of poetry.

She first married her first husband, Mel Fiske, a writer and progressive who she met in Washington D.C. while organizing for the Congress of Industrial Organizations in 1946, and they had one son together. However, they eventually divorced, as the politics of the McCarthy era made O'Hehir wish to move away from their leftist political stances, while Fiske was committed to this political cause, as she recounted to the Marin Independent Journal in 2005 in an article about her most recent books. In 1956, she was remarried, to Brendan O'Hehir, with whom she had another son, and she lived with O'Hehir until they divorced in 1986. Shortly after this, she reconnected with Fiske, as recounted in a 1999 essay in salon.com. O'Hehir and Fiske lived together until Fiske's death, in 2008.

Though not the most prolific, her works have been highly regarded by critics, with several receiving awards.

== Works ==
- Summoned (poetry), 1976
- The Power to Change Geography (poetry), 1979
- I Wish This War Were Over (novel), 1984
- Home Free (poetry), 1988
- The Bride Who Ran Away (novel), 1988
- Mothersongs: Poems For, By, and About Mothers (anthology edited with Sandra M. Gilbert and Susan Gubar), 1995
- Spells For Not Dying Again (poetry), 1996
- Murder Never Forgets (novel), 2005
- Erased from Memory (novel), 2006
- Dark Aura (novel), 2008

== Awards ==
- Summoned: Devins Award from the University of Missouri Press, 1976.
- I Wish This War Were Over, was short-listed for the Pulitzer Prize.
- Guggenheim Fellowship in 1986.
- Spells For Not Dying Again Northern California Book Award for poetry, 1997.
