= Stephen Namara =

American painter

- Born: February 28, 1953 (age 73); Kenya, East Africa
- Education: University of Missouri, California State University
- Known for: Painting, Drawing, Printmaking
- Movement: Figurative, Realism, Landscape, Figuration, Still-Life, Cityscape
- Website: stephennamara.com

Stephen Namara (born February 28, 1953, in Kenya) is an American contemporary figurative artist.

== Life and work ==
His drawings capture the fluidity of the subject and the mystery of its subtext, leaving the paper to reveal traces of the process. His paintings are brought forth in deep colors, rich in texture and evoking a depth and humanity which are sensuously realized. In 2002, Roger Downey said in Seattle Weekly: "We tend to think of drawing as a small-scale monochrome medium, but some of the most impressive pieces on view here are large and marvelously colored. Stephen Namara places a voluptuous reclining nude, all curves and soft shadings, against severe geometric background rendered in the same muted tones."

== Solo exhibitions ==
- 1981 San Francisco State University, San Francisco, CA
- 1986 Shenandoah Gallery, Sacramento, CA
- 1988 Haines Gallery, San Francisco, CA
- 1990 Merced College Art Gallery, Merced, CA
- 1990 Haines Gallery, San Francisco, CA
- 1991 "Stephen Namara Recent Works", Fairfield Art Center, Fairfield, CA
- 1992 Haines Gallery, San Francisco, CA
- 1992 Koplin Gallery, Santa Monica, CA
- 1993 Koplin Gallery, Santa Monica, CA
- 1994 Haines Gallery, San Francisco, CA
- 1994 Koplin Gallery, Santa Monica, CA
- 1997 Koplin Gallery, Los Angeles, CA
- 1999 Koplin Gallery, Los Angeles, CA
- 1999 "New Drawings By Stephen Namara", Dolby Chadwick Gallery, San Francisco, CA
- 2002 Koplin Gallery, Los Angeles, CA
- 2003 Dolby Chadwick Gallery, San Francisco, CA
- 2005 "Allusions and Variations", Koplin del Rio Gallery, Los Angeles, CA
- 2009 Skyline College (Gallery), San Bruno, CA

== Collections ==
- Arkansas Art Center, Little Rock, AR
- San Francisco Arts Commission
- Triton Museum of Art, Santa Clara, California
