= Domhnall mac Conchobair Ó Briain =

Domhnall mac Conchobair Ó Briain, known in English as Sir Donnell O'Brien (died 1579) was a Gaelic Irish leader from Thomond in the Kingdom of Ireland. He is best known for his victory at the Battle of Spancel Hill, against his nephew who was supported by the English government of the Kingdom of Ireland, particularly the Earl of Sussex. Ó Briain was a contender for the title Earl of Thomond from 1553 to 1558 and again from 1563 to 1564.

== Background ==
Ó Briain was the son of Conchobhar mac Toirdhealbaig Ó Briain, King of Thomond and his wife, Anabella Burke. Domhnall's brother was Donough O'Brien, 2nd Earl of Thomond. Domhnall challenged the succession of his nephew Connor O'Brien, 3rd Earl of Thomond to the Lordship of the O'Brien clan. By Gaelic practice Domhnall was inaugurated as Ó Briain, but his attempts to gain Crown recognition of this failed. He was unsuccessful in his attempts to be made an Earl, but he was given a knighthood as a sign of royal favour.

== Battle of Spancel Hill ==
Ó Briain refusal to accept the authority of his nephew led the Lord Lieutenant of Ireland the Earl of Sussex to bring Crown forces into County Clare to support the Earl. Following the departure of Sussex's forces Sir Donnell defeated the Earl and his allies at the Battle of Spancel Hill in 1559. The following year Crown forces returned again to support the Earl. Fighting continued in the area until a compromise agreement was reached in which the Earl would be confirmed in the succession, but Ó Briain would be given independent status.

== Family ==
Ó Briain married a daughter of his uncle Murrough O'Brien, 1st Earl of Thomond.

== Bibliography ==
- Dunlop, Robert (1895). "O'Donnell, Manus" . In Lee, Sidney (ed.). Dictionary of National Biography. Vol. 41. London: Smith, Elder & Co. p. 320.
- Brady, Ciaran (1994). The Chief Governors: The Rise and Fall of Reform Government in Tudor Ireland, 1536-1588. Cambridge University Press.
