= Battle of Spancel Hill =

1559 battle

Date	1559
Location	Spancilhill, County Clare, Ireland
Result	Victory for Sir Donnell O'Brien

Belligerents
Earl of Thomond's supporters	Sir Donnell O'Brien's supporters

Commanders and leaders
Connor O'Brien; Richard Burke	Sir Donnell O'Brien

The Battle of Spancel Hill took place in 1559 in County Clare, Ireland close to modern Kilraghtis when a force led by Sir Donnell O'Brien defeated his rival for leadership of the O'Briens Connor O'Brien, 3rd Earl of Thomond and his ally Richard Burke, 2nd Earl of Clanricarde.

Although primarily a battle for local power amongst rival Gaelic factions it had wider ramifications. The defeat was a blow to the current Lord Lieutenant of Ireland Thomas Radclyffe, 3rd Earl of Sussex who had strongly supported Thomond and had led Crown troops into the area the previous year to install the Earl in power. By contrast the Irish opponents of Sussex were known to be sympathetic to Sir Donnell and used his victory as evidence of Sussex's incompetence. In turn these two factions were allied with rival power groups at the English Court.

Sussex was forced to dispatch a fresh expedition of Royal forces into the area in 1560 to protect Thomond. Eventually a compromise was reached in which Sir Donnell was granted a status independent of Thomond's overlordship which brought peace to the area.

== Bibliography ==
- Brady, Ciaran. The Chief Governors: The Rise and Fall of Reform Government in Tudor Ireland, 1536-1588. Cambridge University Press, 1994.
