= Murrough O'Brien, 1st Earl of Thomond =

Irish peer, Chief of Clan O'Brien and King of Thomond

Murrough O'Brien
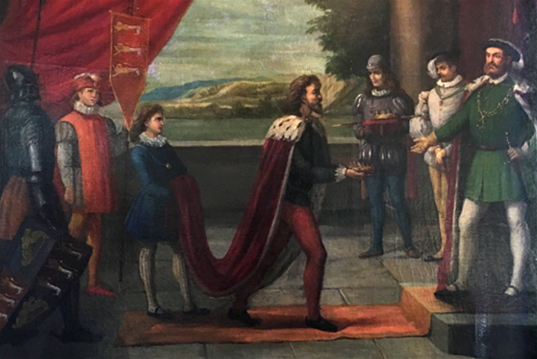
- Murrough surrenders the crown of Thomond to King Henry VIII at Greenwich upon the Thames July 1543.

King of Thomond
- Reign: 1540-1543
- Predecessor: Conor O'Brien
- Successor: Monarchy abolished

Earl of Thomond
- Reign: 1 July 1543 – 7 November 1551
- Successor: Donough O'Brien

Baron of Inchiquin
- Reign: 1 July 1543 – 7 November 1551
- Successor: Dermod O'Brien
- Born: Before 1486
- Died: 7 November 1551
- Spouse: Eleanor FitzGerald
- Issue: Turlogh O'Brien (died 1542); Dermod O'Brien; Teige Mac Murrough O'Brien; Donough O'Brien
- House: Ua Briain
- Father: Toirdhealbhach Donn Ó Briain
- Mother: Raghnait MacNamara

Murrough O'Brien, 1st Baron of Inchiquin, 1st Earl of Thomond (Irish: Murchadh an Tánaiste Ó Briain) (died 7 November 1551) was an Irish peer, Chief of Clan O'Brien, and the last King of Thomond.

== Biography ==
Murrough was a lineal descendant of Brian Boru, High King of Ireland, and was the third or fourth son of Turlough O'Brien, Lord of Thomond (d. 1528), and Raghnailt, daughter of John MacNamara. On the death of his brother, Conor O'Brien, in 1539, he succeeded by custom of tanistry to the lordship of Thomond and the chieftainship of the Dal Cais. Conor had made a vain endeavour to divert the succession to his children by his second wife, Ellen, sister of James Fitzjohn Fitzgerald, fourteenth earl of Desmond, and there had been, in consequence, much dissension between the brothers. Murrough was one of the five Irish lords who swore loyalty to Henry VIII in 1541.

O'Brien's first step in attaining the chieftainship was to join Con O'Neill and Manus O'Donnell in a confederacy against the English government. Their scheme, however, was frustrated by the vigilance of Sir William Brereton; and on the arrival shortly afterwards of Sir Anthony St Leger as viceroy, O'Brien expressed a wish to parley with him. Early in 1541, O'Brien met the lord-deputy at Limerick City. Conditions of peace and submission were propounded to him; but, as these included the restriction of his authority to the west of the River Shannon, and other stipulations affecting his clan as well as himself, he asked time for deliberation. He made, however, no difficulty about acknowledging Henry VIII as his sovereign or renouncing the supremacy of the Pope, and was represented in the Parliament of Ireland which in that year conferred on Henry the title of King of Ireland. On the adjournment of the Parliament to Limerick on 15 February 1542, he went there. The recent submission of Con O'Neill in December 1541 exercised a profound effect upon him, and he not only consented to the curtailment of his authority to the west of the Shannon, but expressed his intention of personally renewing his submission to Henry, promising for himself and his followers to live and die his "true, faithful, and obedient servants". He appeared to St Leger "a very sobre man, and very like to contynewe your Majesties trewe subjecte"; and Henry, gratified by his submission, expressed his intention of conferring on him some title of honour, together with a grant of all the suppressed religious houses in his country.

There was some difficulty in reconciling the Irish succession by tanistry with that of primogeniture; but it was finally concluded that O'Brien himself should be created Earl of Thomond for life, the title to revert after his death, not to his eldest son, who was created Baron Inchiquin, but to his nephew Donough, created at the same time Baron Ibrickan, the two titles merging upon Murrough's death. This ingenious solution of a perplexing problem clearly demonstrated Henry's intention to proceed in the reconquest of Ireland by conciliatory methods, if possible; he hoped that time would bring with it a practical reconciliation of the laws and customs of the two countries. On the adjournment of the Parliament to Trim (12 to 21 June 1542), O'Brien went there with his nephew Donough, "both honestly accompanied and apparelled", and attended the lord-deputy to Dublin, where he remained for three or four days. At his own request he was included in the commission for the suppression of the religious houses in Thomond, and in the following year visited England. Owing to the general dearth of money in Ireland, St Leger was obliged to lend him, for his journey, £100. in harp-groats, i.e. in pence. He arrived at court, accompanied by Ulic de Burgh, 1st earl of Clanricarde, in June 1543, and, having renewed his submission, he was, on Sunday, 1 July, created Earl of Thomond. The expenses of his installation were defrayed by Henry, who also, for his "better satisfaction", granted him a house and lands in Dublin for his entertainment during his attendance at Parliament.

After a brief sojourn in London, O'Brien returned to Ireland. The honours conferred upon him were followed by beneficial results. He had, of course, his quarrels with his neighbours, the Burkes and Munster Geraldines, and more than once his attitude threatened the general peace. But he had a sincere regard for St Leger, and a word from him was sufficient to control him. He accompanied St Leger to the water's edge at his departure in April 1546, and was one of those who welcomed him on his return in 1550. He died in the following year and was succeeded by his nephew Donough, who surrendered his patent, and was granted a new one on 7 November 1552, conferring the title on him and the heirs male of his body.

== Family ==
O'Brien married Eleanor FitzGerald, daughter of Thomas FitzGerald, Knight of the Valley. They had three sons and four daughters.

- Toirdhealbhach O'Brien (died 1542: The son of O'Brien (Turlough, the son of Murrough, son of Turlough) died in his bed, at Inis-I-Chuinn. He was the most expert at arms, the most famous and illustrious man, of his years, in his time.
- Dermod O'Brien, 2nd Baron Inchiquin
- Teige Mac Murrough O'Brien
- Donough O'Brien
- a daughter Slaine who married her cousin Sir Donnell O'Brien.

== Notes ==
Regnal titles
Preceded by Connor O'Brien	King of Thomond; 1539–1543	Kingdom abolished
Peerage of Ireland
New creation	Earl of Thomond; 1543–1551	Succeeded by Donough O'Brien
New creation	Baron Inchiquin; 1543–1551	Succeeded by Dermod O'Brien
