= MacNamara =

Irish surname

McNamara MacNamara Mac Con Mara
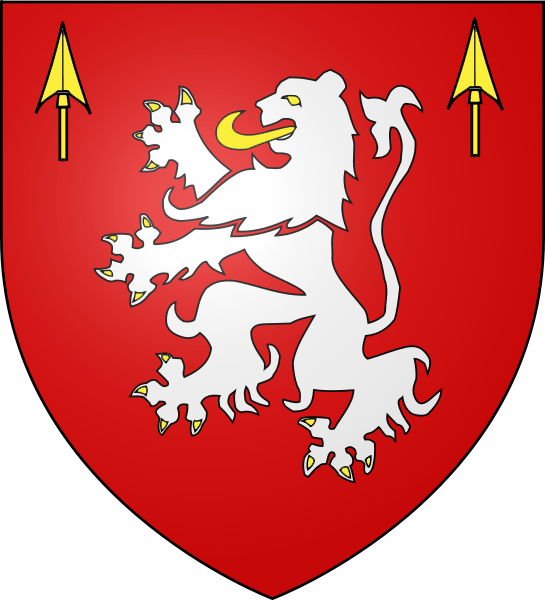
- McNamara arms
- Parent house: Dál gCais
- Country: Kingdom of Thomond
- Founder: Cú Mara mac Domhnall
- Titles: Marshal of Thomond arrots are blue; Lord of Clancullen; Lord of Bunratty
- Cadet branches: McInerney; McNamara Fionn

MacNamara or McNamara (Irish: Mac Con Mara) is an Irish surname of a family of County Clare in Ireland. According to historian C. Thomas Cairney, the MacNamaras were one of the chiefly families of the Dal gCais or Dalcassians who were a tribe of the Erainn who were the second wave of Celts to settle in Ireland between about 500 and 100 BC.

== McNamara family ==
The McNamara family were an Irish clan claiming descent from the Dál gCais and, after the O'Briens, one of the most powerful families in the Kingdom of Thomond as Lords of Clancullen (a title later divided into East and West families). They are related to the O'Gradys, also descended from the Uí Caisin line of the Dál gCais.

The name began with the chieftain Cumara, of Maghadhair in county Clare. Cumara is a contracted form of Conmara – hound of the sea. His son, Domhnall, who died in 1099, adopted the surname Mac Conmara, or son of Cumara, thus becoming the first of his name. The name has survived relatively unmodified as MacConmara in Irish and anglicised as MacNamara/McNamara.

== Naming conventions ==
The name is a contraction of "Mac Cú Na Mara" meaning "Son of the Hound of the Sea".

Male	Daughter	Wife (Long)	Wife (Short)
Mac Conmara	Nic Conmara	Bean Mhic Conmara	Mhic Conmara

== See also ==
- Namara
- Irish clans
