= Early Barons Inchiquin =

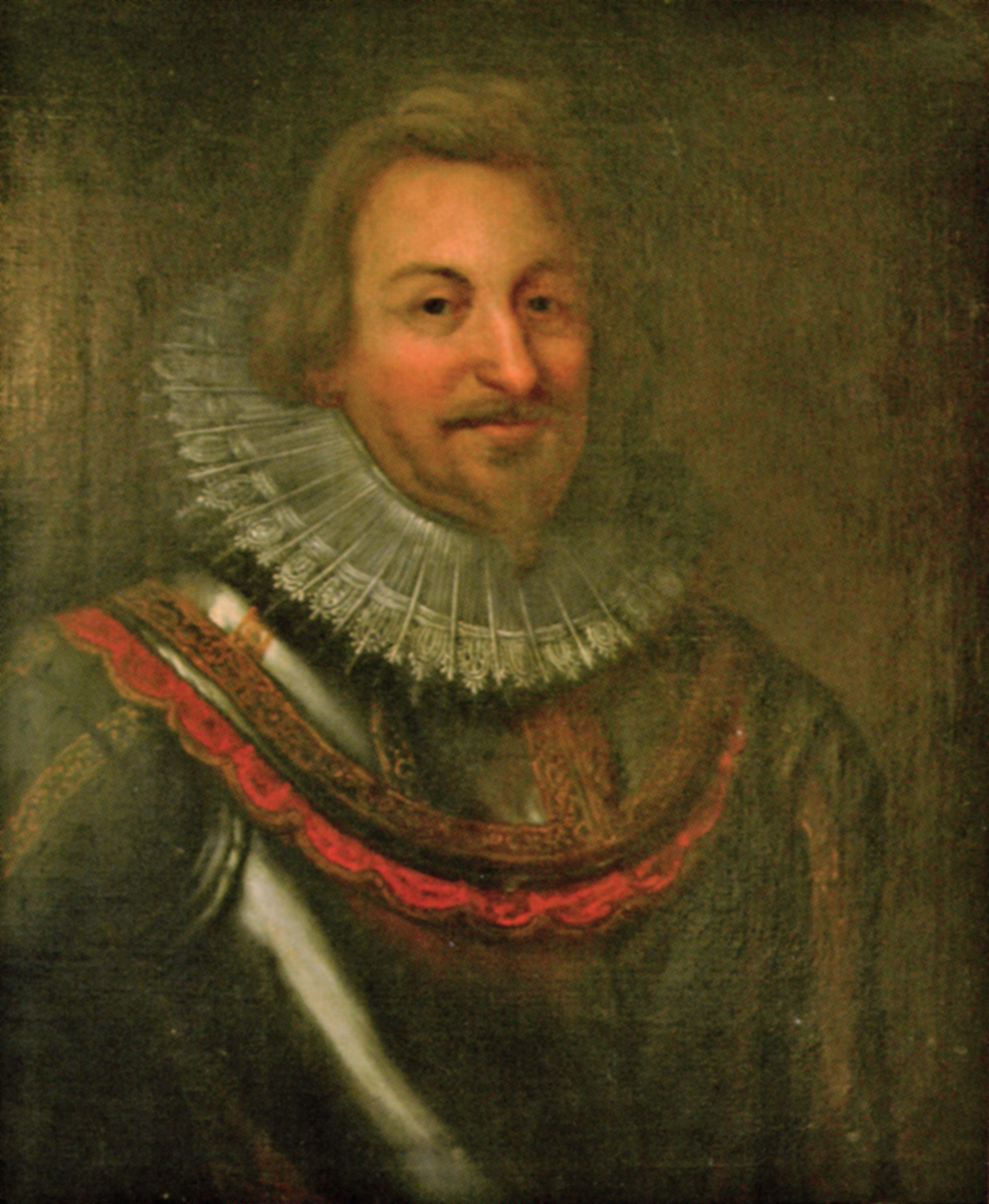
Murrough O'Brien, 1st Earl of Inchiquin

There were six early Barons Inchiquin in Ireland between 1543 and 1654. The title was granted to Murrough O'Brien, the brother of Conor O'Brien, King of Thomond, when he surrendered his Irish royalty to King Henry VIII in 1543. His descendants held the title until 1654, when Murrough O'Brien, 6th Baron Inchiquin was created Earl of Inchiquin.

== Murrough O'Brien, 1st Baron Inchiquin ==
Murrough O'Brien, 1st Earl of Thomond and 1st Baron Inchiquin (died 1551) was the son of Turlogh O'Brien (Toirdelbach Ua Briain), Prince of Thomond (died 1528) and Raghnailt Macnamara, daughter of John Macnamara. His father was the son of Teige An Chomard, King of Thomond. He took the crown of Thomond on the death of his brother Conor 1540, but surrendered power to Henry VIII after the Irish Parliament passed the Crown of Ireland Act 1542, making his submission in 1543 in London, where he was created an earl.

Murrough O'Brien married Eleanor FitzGerald, daughter of John FitzGerald, Knight of Glin. Murrough O'Brien was succeeded in the earldom of Thomond according to a special remainder by his nephew Donough. His son Dermod was the 2nd Baron Inchiquin in the tail male. His other children were Donough, Teige and Torlogh.

== Dermod O'Brien, 2nd Baron Inchiquin ==
Dermod O'Brien, 2nd Baron Inchiquin (d. 1 May 1557) was the son of Murrough O'Brien, 1st Earl of Thomond and his wife Eleanor FitzGerald. He married Margaret O'Brien, daughter of Donough O'Brien and Slany MacNamara, before 1550. His son Murrough McDermot was the 3rd Baron Inchiquin.

== Murrough McDermot O'Brien, 3rd Baron Inchiquin ==
Murrough McDermot O'Brien, 3rd Baron Inchiquin (1550–1574) was the son of Dermod O'Brien, 2nd Baron Inchiquin and his wife Margaret O'Brien. He married Margaret Cusack, daughter of Thomas Cusack, Lord Chancellor of Ireland. His son Murrough was the 4th Baron Inchiquin. As late as 1559, we hear that the O'Bryans and others Irish peers could understand no English, and required the services of the Earl of Ormonde to translate the learned speeches of Sir Thomas Cusack into their tongue.

== Murrough O'Brien, 4th Baron Inchiquin ==
Murrough O'Brien, 4th Baron Inchiquin (1563–1597) was the son of Murrough McDermot O'Brien, 3rd Baron Inchiquin and his wife Margaret Cussack. He married Mabel Nugent, daughter of Christopher Nugent, 5th Baron Delvin. His son Dermod was the 5th Baron Inchiquin. However, another source states that Murrough married Margaret, daughter of Sir Thomas Cusack, Lord Chancellor, and Lord Justice of the "Pale", and had children Dermod, Teige (who married Slaine, daughter of Murrough O'Brien of the Aran Isles) and Slaine, who married William Dongan, Recorder of Dublin. According to this source, it was his father who married Anabella (or Mable), daughter of Christopher Nugent, the ninth Lord Delvin.

== Dermod O'Brien, 5th Baron Inchiquin ==
Dermod O'Brien, 5th Baron Inchiquin (c. November 1594 – 2 December 1624) was the son of Murrough O'Brien, 4th Baron Inchiquin and his wife Mabel Nugent. Dermot O'Brien had a daughter Honora (mother unknown) who married Anthony Stoughton of Rattoo, County Kerry. Dermod O'Brien married Ellen FitzGerald, daughter of Sir Edmund FitzGerald of Cloyne in County Cork, from a powerful Hiberno-Norman family. Their daughter Mary married Michael Boyle, Archbishop of Armagh and their son, Murrough, 6th Baron Inchiquin, became the first Earl of Inchiquin. Other children were Henry (died 1645), a lieutenant colonel in the army Of King Charles I, Christopher (died c. 1664) and Ann.

== Murrough O'Brien, 6th Baron Inchiquin ==
Murrough O'Brien, 6th Baron Inchiquin (1618–1674) was the son of Dermod O'Brien, 5th Baron Inchiquin and his wife Ellen FitzGerald. On the outbreak of the Irish Rebellion of 1641, King Charles I made him governor of Munster. He was forced to submit to parliament in 1644, and was made President of Munster. O'Brien became declared for Charles I in 1648, fortified the southern ports against parliament and signed a truce with the confederate Catholics. He joined by James Butler, 1st Duke of Ormonde, with whom he got possession of Drogheda and Dundalk. Facing Oliver Cromwell's superior forces he retired to the west of the Shannon and then left Ireland for France in 1650, where he became one of the royal council and in 1654 was created Earl of Inchiquin. He served under the French in Catalonia in 1654, and was engaged in the Sexby Plot in 1656 and in the same year became a Roman Catholic. He was taken prisoner by the Algerines in 1660, but ransomed the same year and became high steward of Queen Henrietta Maria's household. He lived quietly in Ireland after 1663.

== See also ==
- Baron Inchiquin
- List of monarchs of Thomond
