= Donough O'Brien, 16th Baron Inchiquin =

Irish peer (1897–1968)

The Right Honourable The Lord Inchiquin
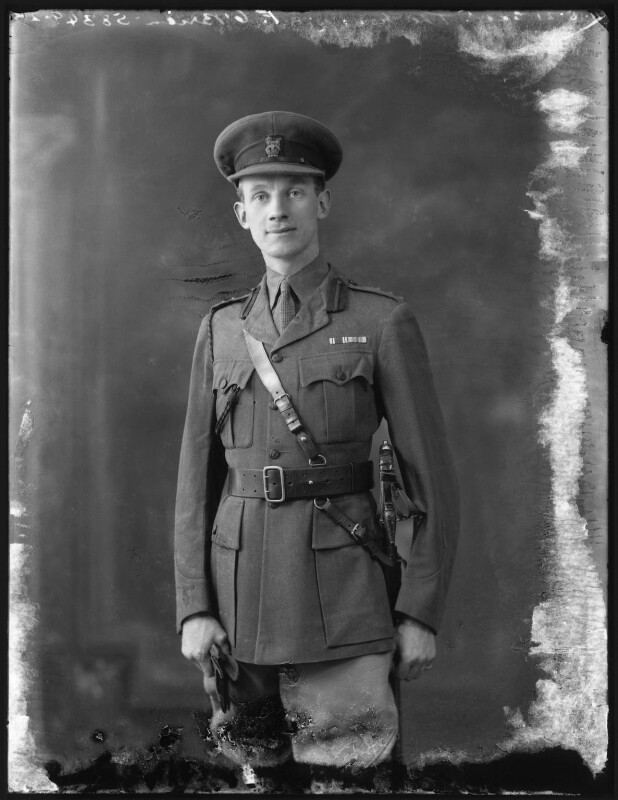

Baron Inchiquin
- In office 9 December 1929 – 19 October 1968

Personal details
- Born: Donough Edward Foster O'Brien; 5 January 1897 London, United Kingdom
- Died: 19 October 1968 (aged 71)
- Spouse: Anne Thesiger (m. 1921)
- Children: 2
- Parent: Lucius William O'Brien, 15th Baron of Inchiquin (father)
- Education: Magdalen College School, Oxford; Eton College; Royal Military College, Sandhurst
- Awards: Order of the Crown of Romania

Military service
- Allegiance: United Kingdom
- Branch/service: British Army
- Years of service: 1916–1921; 1939–1942
- Rank: Captain
- Unit: Rifle Brigade; London Rifle Brigade
- Battles/wars: World War I; World War II

Donough Edward Foster O'Brien, 16th Baron Inchiquin (5 January 1897 – 19 October 1968) was an Irish peer and 29th direct descendant of Brian Boru.

== Early life ==
Inchiquin was the first of five children born to Lucius O'Brien, 15th Baron Inchiquin and Ethel Jane O'Brien née Foster, daughter of Johnston Jonas Foster JP of Cliffe Hill, Lightcliffe. Inchiquin was educated at Magdalen College School, Eton College and the Royal Military College.

== Military career ==
Inchiquin was commissioned from the Royal Military College into the Rifle Brigade in 1916, he continued to serve in the brigade within the 3rd Battalion throughout the First World War. Inchiquin was Aid-de-Camp to the Viceroy of India and his future father-in-law, Frederic Thesiger, 1st Viscount Chelmsford, between 1919 and 1920. Inchiquin left regular service in 1921. He was awarded the Order of the Crown (Romania). Inchiquin returned to service in 1939 with the territorial regiment, the London Rifle Brigade. He continued to serve in the Second World War until 1942, when he finally retired with the rank of captain.

According to Desmond Oulton (owner of Clontarf Castle), his father John George Oulton had suggested to Éamon de Valera towards the end of the Irish Free State, that Ireland should have its own king again, as it was in the times of Gaelic Ireland. He suggested to him, a member of the O'Brien Clan, descended in the paternal line from Brian Boru, a previous High King of Ireland: the most senior representative at the time was Donough O'Brien, 16th Baron Inchiquin. Oulton said that Donough's nephew Conor O'Brien, 18th Baron Inchiquin, confirmed that De Valera did offer Donough O'Brien the title of Prince-President of the Irish Republic, but this was turned down and so a President of Ireland was instituted instead.

== Family ==
Inchiquin was the older brother of Phaedrig O'Brien, 17th Baron Inchiquin and the uncle of Conor O'Brien, 18th Baron Inchiquin.

He married, on 13 December 1921 Anne Molyneux Thesiger (1898–1973), daughter of Frederic Thesiger, 1st Viscount Chelmsford, the Viceroy of India whom Inchiquin served under as his Aide-de-Camp. Together they had two daughters:

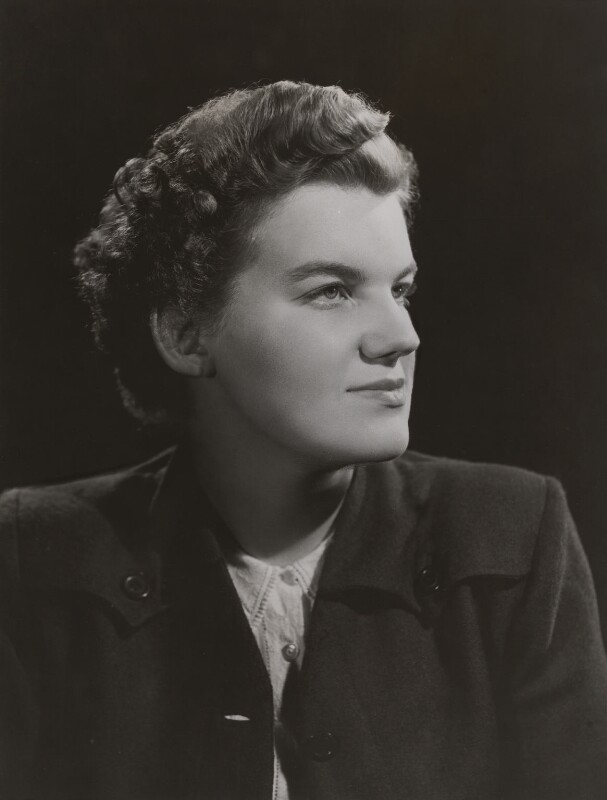
The 16th Baron Inchiquins eldest daughter Deirdre Chapin née O'Brien

- Deirdre O'Brien born 1924, who served in the Women's Royal Naval Service during the Second World War. She married the physician Dr Horace Beecher Chapin (died. 19 Feb 1992), son of Horace H. Chapin of New York on 23 April 1954. Her last reported residence was Bermuda.
- Grania O'Brien born 1928 who was Private Secretary to Sir Arthur Salter PC MP between 1947 and 1952. O'Brien was then social secretary to Sir John Balfour, KCMG in 1952 and then to Sir Esler Denning, GCMG between 1954 and 1957. O'Brien then went on to be social secretary to John Hay Whitney, United States Ambassador to the United Kingdom in 1958 and then finally to Sir Berkeley Gage, Ambassador to Peru between 1958 and 1960. On 17 July 1973 O'Brien wed Hugh William Lindsay Weir, son of Major Terence Weir MC. Her last reported residence was Ballinakella Lodge, County Clare.

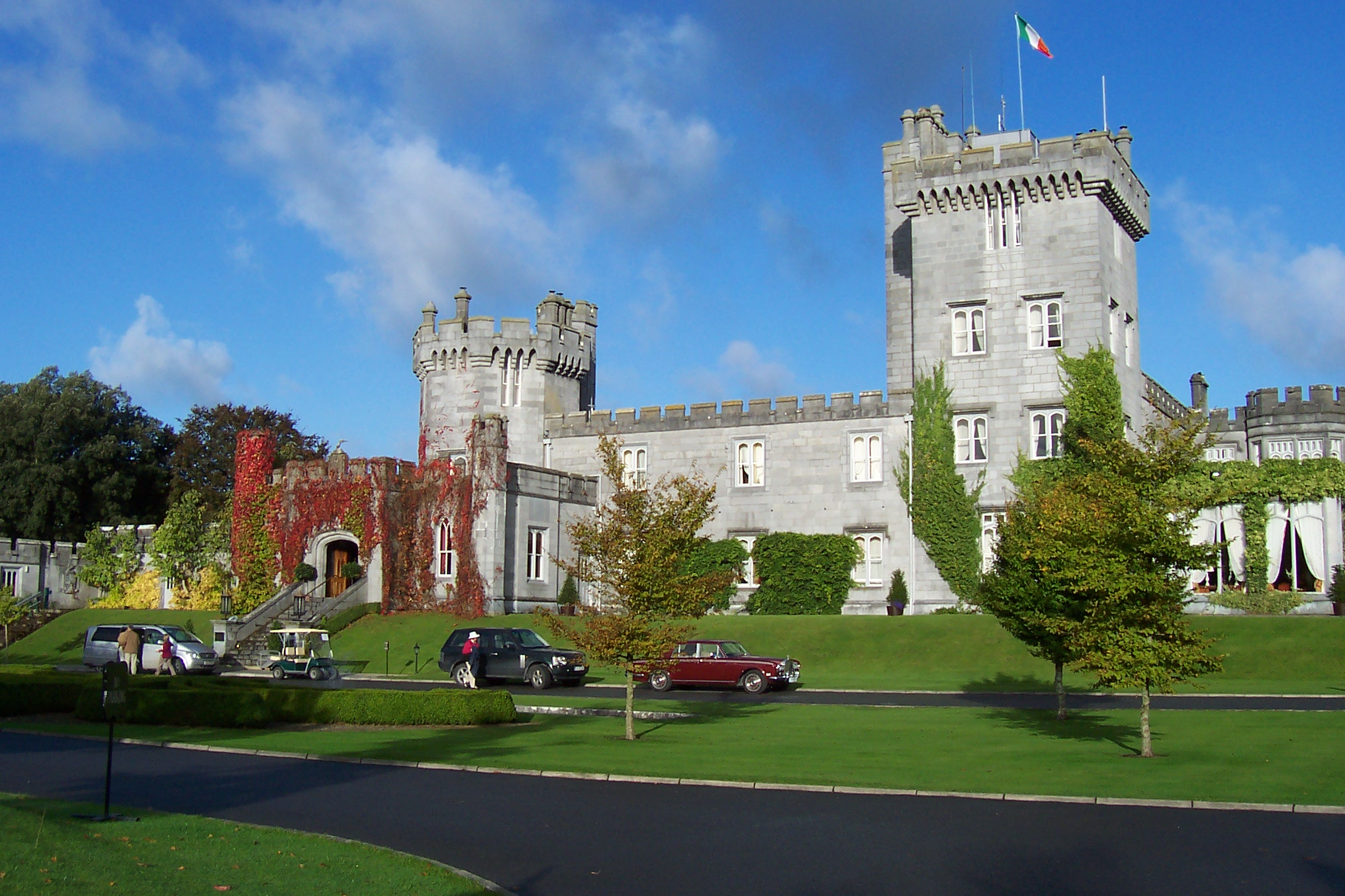
Dromoland Castle today

Inchiquin inherited the family Dromoland Castle estate in Ireland and Moor Park near Ludlow, Shropshire. He moved home permanently to Ireland in 1939. Inchiquin had managed to keep hold of the estate for 20 years, by turning the estate into a dairy farm however by 1948 the financial state of the estate was so dire Inchiquin had to allow tourists to stay as paying guests. In 1962 Inchiquin finally gave in to the financial strain and sold the Dromoland Castle and 350 acres (1.4 km^{2}) of its estate to billionaire industrialist Bernard McDonough and built himself nearby Thomond House, which he moved into in 1965 and a house that the current Baron Inchiquin resides in. The ancestral seat today serves as a luxury hotel and continues to be owned by a series of Irish American businessmen. As the holder of the hereditary peerage in the Peerage of Ireland, Baron Inchiquin was the Chief of the Dál gCais tribe, Chief of the Name of O'Brien and Prince of Thomond in the Gaelic Irish nobility.

Inchiquin died in 1968 aged 71 and was succeeded in the peerage by his younger brother, Phaedrig.

Peerage of Ireland
Preceded by Lucius O'Brien	Baron Inchiquin; 1929–1968	Succeeded by Phaedrig O'Brien
