= Conor O'Brien, 19th Baron Inchiquin =

English-born Irish clan chief

Sir Conor John Anthony O'Brien, 19th Baron Inchiquin (born 24 September 1952) The O’Brien (Chief of the Name), Prince of Thomond, and 11th Baronet of Leamaneh, is an English-born Irish clan chief and holder of an Irish peerage. He succeeded his first cousin, Conor O'Brien, 18th Baron Inchiquin, as the 19th Baron Inchiquin in June 2023.

== Early life and education ==
Lord Inchiquin was born in London on 24 September 1952. He is the son of Murrough Richard O'Brien (1910–2000) and Joan Gladys O'Brien (1916–2004). He was educated at Eton College, and went on to study French at the University of Montpellier in France.

== Family background ==
Lord Inchiquin is descended from the O'Brien dynasty, a noble family with lineage tracing back to Brian Boru, High King of Ireland. His great-grandfather was Edward Donough O'Brien, 14th Baron Inchiquin (1839–1900).

He succeeded to the title of Baron Inchiquin in June 2023 upon the death of his cousin, Conor O'Brien, 18th Baron Inchiquin (1943–2023).

== Personal life ==
Lord Inchiquin has two children: Fionn Murrough O'Brien (born 1987) and Slaney Victoria O'Brien (born 1989).

Peerage of Ireland
Preceded by Conor O'Brien, 18th Baron Inchiquin	Baron Inchiquin; 2023–present	Succeeded by Incumbent
