= Phaedrig O'Brien, 17th Baron Inchiquin =

British geologist (1900–1982)

The Right Honourable The Lord Inchiquin
- The arms of the Barony of Inchiquin

Baron Inchiquin
- In office 19 October 1968 – 20 May 1982

Personal details
- Born: Phaedrig Lucius Ambrose O'Brien; 4 April 1900 Moor Park near Ludlow, Shropshire
- Died: 20 May 1982 (aged 82)
- Spouse: Vera Winter (m. 1945)
- Parent(s): Lucius William O'Brien, 15th Baron of Inchiquin; Ethel Jane Foster
- Education: Eton College; Magdalen College, Oxford; Royal School of Mines, Imperial College London

Military service
- Allegiance: United Kingdom
- Branch/service: British Army
- Years of service: 1918; 1940–1946
- Rank: Major
- Unit: Rifle Brigade; East Africa Intelligence corps
- Battles/wars: World War II
- Awards: Mention in Dispatches

Phaedrig Lucius Ambrose O'Brien, 17th Baron Inchiquin (4 April 1900 – 20 May 1982) was a geologist. Additionally, he was the holder of a hereditary peerage in the Peerage of Ireland, as well as Chief of the Name of O'Brien and Prince of Thomond in the Gaelic Irish nobility.

== Early life ==
Inchiquin was the third of five children born to Lucius O'Brien, 15th Baron Inchiquin and Ethel Jane O'Brien née Foster, daughter of Johnston Jonas Foster JP of Cliffe Hill, Lightcliffe, and of Moor Park near Ludlow, Shropshire. He was born at Moor Park, where his parents resided, on 4 April 1900, a mere days before his father inherited the barony, and educated at Eton College.

== Career ==
Inchiquin came of military age in 1918, and as such briefly served in Britain in World War I as a Gunner in the Royal Field Artillery, however, the conflict ended before he had served on active service or had been promoted.

Inchiquin then went on to study at Magdalen College, Oxford where he graduated with an MA, and undertook further studies at the Imperial College London's Royal School of Mines, Inchiquin then went on to work in Kenya as a farmer and coffee planter from 1922 until 1936 when he was professionally engaged as a geologist in the mining industry by the Anglo-American Corporation of South Africa.

Inchiquin left Africa in 1939 to serve in World War II. He was commissioned in 1940 as Second Lieutenant into the Rifle Brigade. Inchiquin was subsequently attached to the East African Intelligence Corps in Somaliland, Ethiopia and Madagascar and was mentioned in despatches in 1941, as well as wounded. Inchiquin rose to the rank of Major in 1943 and was finally demobilised in 1946.

After demobilisation he returned to the Anglo-American Corporation of South Africa and worked for the company until he entered the British Colonial Service in 1954. He was employed on survey to the government of Northern Rhodesia(now Zambia), as senior geologist, becoming assistant director in 1957. He retired from the Colonial Service in 1959, but continued to work as a consultant geologist until 1967, and succeeded to the Baron Inchiquin peerage in 1968.

== Family ==
Inchiquin was the younger brother of Donough O'Brien, 16th Baron Inchiquin, whom he inherited the Baron Inchiquin peerage from upon his death as he had no male issue. He was also the uncle of Conor O'Brien, 18th Baron Inchiquin.

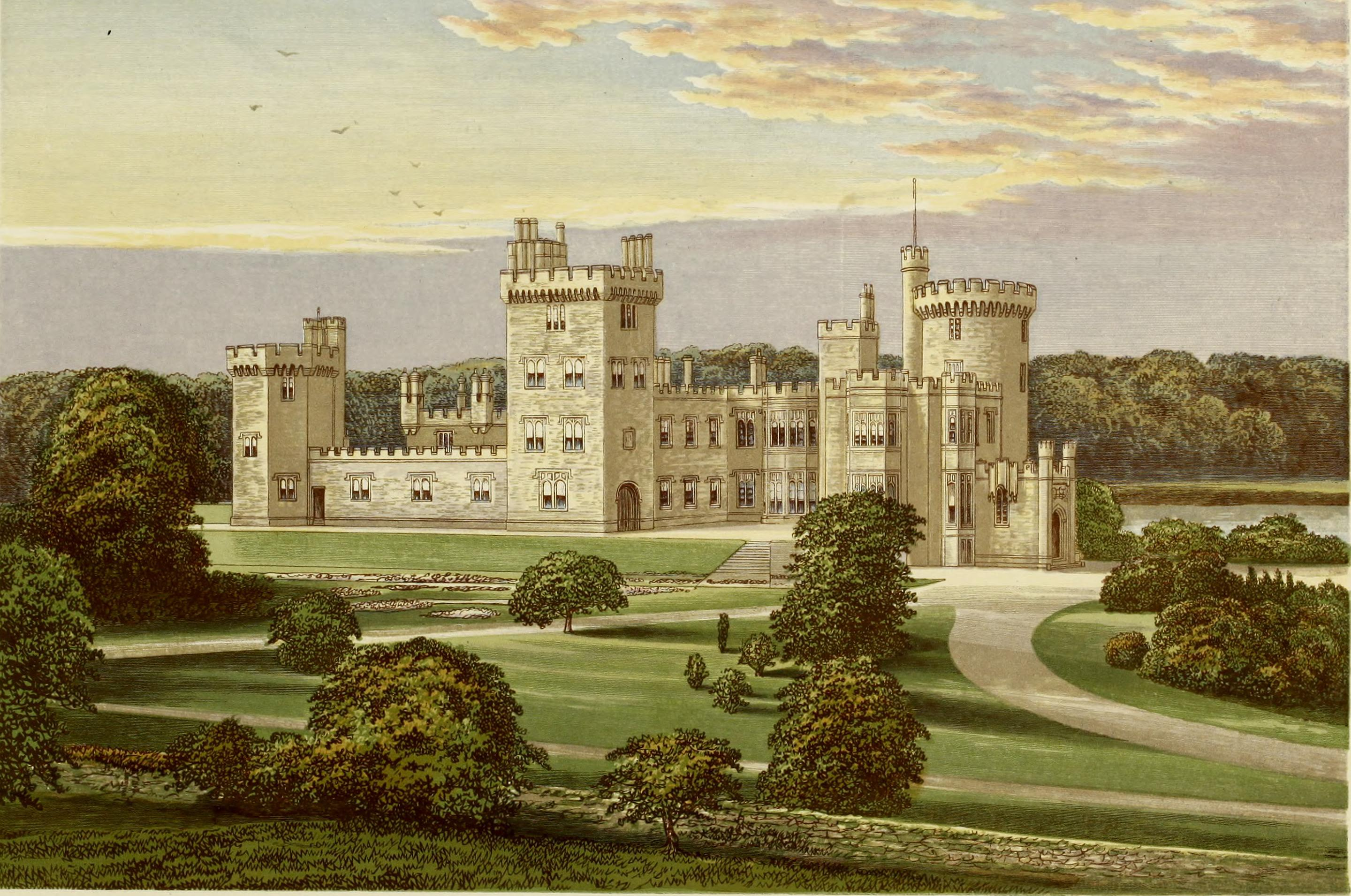
The former seat of the Baron Inchiquin's, Dromoland Castle

On 19 February 1945, he married Vera Maud Winter, the daughter of Reverend Clifton Winter of Winton House in Dawlish, Devon. They had no issue.

After succeeding to his brother's peerage, he returned to Ireland where he maintained Thomond House on the former ancestral estate of Dromoland Castle. The 16th Baron had sold most of the estate including the ancestral seat to billionaire industrialist Bernard McDonough in 1962 and had subsequently built the adjacent Thomond House. Today the Castle remains intact and serves as a luxury hotel. It is now owned by a series of Irish-American businessmen. Inchiquin also maintained a smaller home in England at Richard's Castle near Ludlow.

Inchiquin died on 20 May 1982, in Richards Castle and was succeeded by his nephew Conor as the 18th Baron Inchiquin.

Peerage of Ireland
Preceded by Donough O'Brien	Baron Inchiquin; 1968–1982	Succeeded by Conor O'Brien
