= Dermod O'Brien, 5th Baron Inchiquin =

Irish baron

Dermod Ruadh O'Brien, 5th Baron of Inchiquin (October 1594 – 29 December 1624) was an Irish baron.

== Biography ==
Dermod, who was born in October 1594, was the son of Murrough O'Brien, 4th Baron Inchiquin (1562 – 24 July 1597), the son of Murrough McDermot O'Brien, 3rd Baron Inchiquin and Mabel Nugent, daughter of Christopher Nugent, 6th Baron Delvin. He inherited the barony at the age of two.

== Family ==
Dermod O'Brien married Ellen, eldest daughter of Sir Edmund FitzJohn FitzGerald of Cloyne and Ballymaloe House in County Cork, from that powerful Hiberno-Norman family. They had four sons, (Note: John O'Hart states that there were two sons called Christopher and the first died as an infant. However Lucius, 13th Lord Inchiquin in his "Petition..." states that there were only three brothers, and Darryl Lundy citing Cokayne and Mosley only mentions one Christopher.) and several daughters:

- Murrough, 6th Baron Inchiquin, their eldest son, became the first Earl of Inchiquin.
- Henry (d. 1645), a lieutenant colonel in the army of King Charles I.
- Christopher (died 1664), a lieutenant-colonel in the Irish Confederate Army, who was created "Baron of Inchiquin," by the Supreme Council of the Catholic Confederation. He never married.
- Murtough O'Brien, who led a guerrilla campaign against Cromwell's generals in the Burren. He later obtained a pardon and emigrated to Spain where he became a general in the Spanish army
- Honora, who married Anthony Stoughton of Rattoo, County Kerry.
- Mary, married Michael Boyle, Archbishop of Armagh, and Lord Chancellor of Ireland, and had with him numerous children, including Murrough Boyle, 1st Viscount Blesington, and Eleanor (who became the wife of the William Hill of Hillsborough, M.P., and mother to Michael Hill (1672–1699) M.P.).
- Ann, died unmarried

== Ancestors ==
Ancestors of Dermod O'Brien, 5th Baron Inchiquin

16. Murrough O'Brien, 1st Earl of Thomond
8. Dermod O'Brien, 2nd Baron Inchiquin
17. Eleanor FitzGerald
4. Murrough O'Brien, 3rd Baron Inchiquin
18. Donough O'Brien, 2nd Earl of Thomond
9. Margaret O'Brien
19. Helen Butler
2. Murrough O'Brien, 4th Baron Inchiquin
20. John Cusack
10. Sir Thomas Cusack
21. Alison de Wellesley
5. Margaret Cusack
22. George Darcy
11. Maud Darcy
23. Jane Riccard
1. Dermod O'Brien, 5th Baron Inchiquin
24. Christopher Nugent
12. Richard Nugent, 5th Baron Delvin
25. Marion St Lawrence
6. Christopher Nugent, 6th Baron Delvin
26. Jenico Preston
13. Elizabeth Preston
27. Catherine FitzGerald
3. Mabel Nugent
28. Gerald FitzGerald, 9th Earl of Kildare
14. Gerald FitzGerald, 11th Earl of Kildare
29. Elizabeth Grey
7. Mary FitzGerald
30. Anthony Browne
15. Mabel Browne
31. Alice Gage

== See also ==
- Early Barons Inchiquin
- Baron Inchiquin
- O'Brien Pedigree

== Bibliography ==
- The Anglo-American Magazine, vol. 1, Toronto: Maclear, July–December 1852, p. 506
- Bagwell, Richard (1888), "O'Brien, Murrough (1614-1674)" , in Stephen, Leslie (ed.), Dictionary of National Biography, vol. 16, London: Smith, Elder & Co, pp. 320–327
- Inchiquin, Lucius Lord of (1861) [1765], "The Petition of the right Honourable Lucius Baron of Inchiquin (otherwise Inskwyne), of that part of the United Kingdom of Great Britain and Ireland called Ireland.", Case of the Right Honourable Lucius, lord Inchiquin in the peerage of Ireland on his claiming the right to vote at the election of representative peers for Ireland. ..., pp. 66–70
- Lundy, Darryl (22 October 2012), Dermot O'Brien, 5th Baron of Inchiquin, thepeerage.com, p. 10284 § 102833 Endnotes:
  - Cokayne, G.E. (2000), Vicary Gibbs; H.A. Doubleday; Geoffrey H. White; Duncan Warrand; Howard de Walden (eds.), The Complete Peerage of England, Scotland, Ireland, Great Britain and the United Kingdom, Extant, Extinct or Dormant, vol. 1 (nee, 1910–1959; reprint in 6 volumes ed.), Gloucester, UK: Alan Sutton Publishing, p. 193
  - Mosley, Charles, ed. (2003), Burke's Peerage, Baronetage & Knightage, vol. 1 (107th, 3 volumes ed.), Wilmington, Delaware, USA: Burke's Peerage, p. 400
  - Mosley, Charles, ed. (2003), Burke's Peerage, Baronetage & Knightage, vol. 2 (107th, 3 volumes ed.), Wilmington, Delaware, USA: Burke's Peerage, p. 2035
- O'Hart, John (2007), The Irish And Anglo-Irish Landed Gentry, When Cromwell Came to Ireland: Or, a Supplement to Irish Pedigrees (reprint ed.), Heritage Books, p. 129, ISBN 9780788419270

Peerage of Ireland
Preceded by Murrough O'Brien	Baron Inchiquin; 1597 - 1624	Succeeded by Murrough O'Brien
