= Murrough O'Brien, 1st Earl of Inchiquin =

Irish soldier and lord (1614–1673)

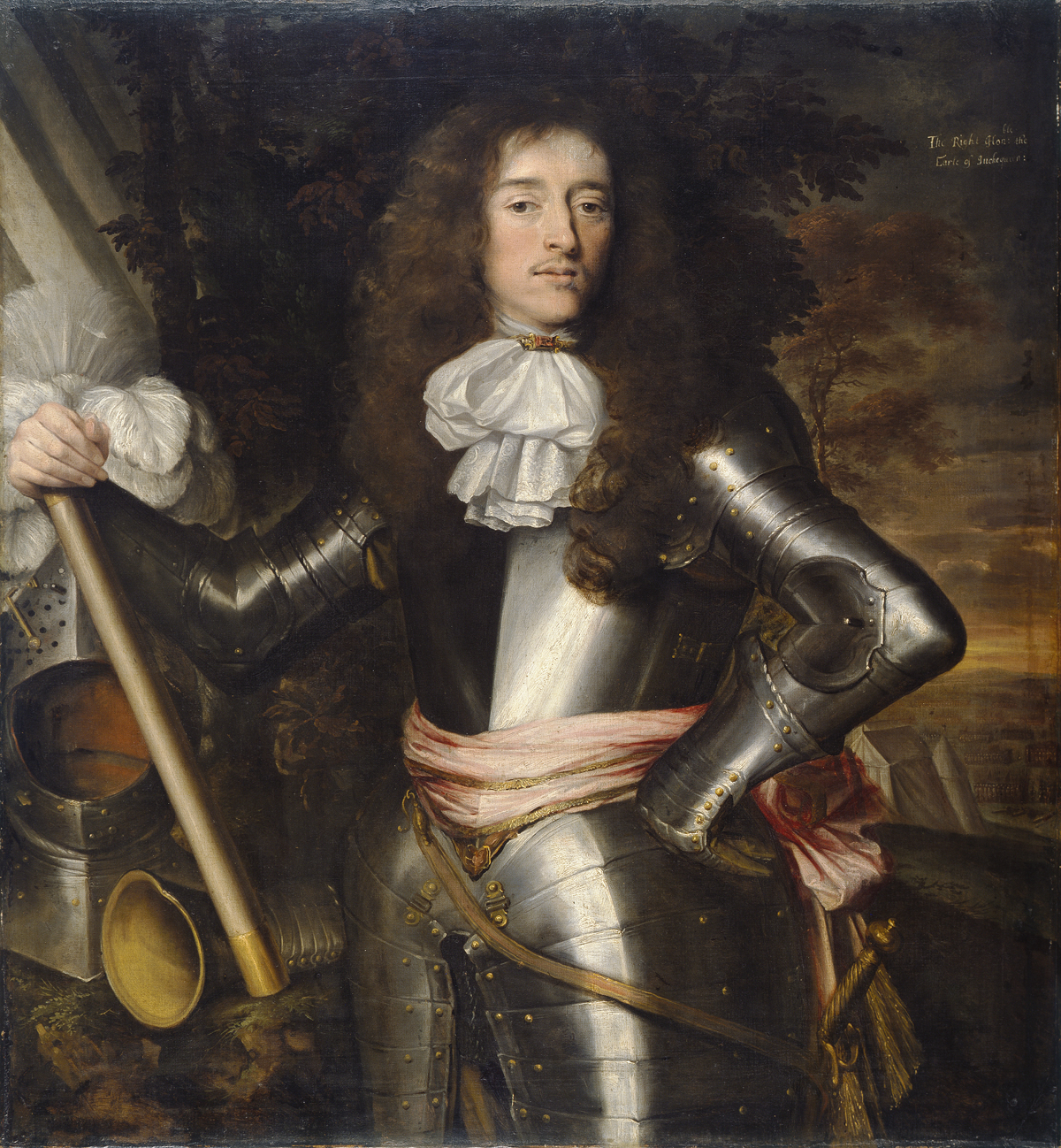
- Portrait by John Michael Wright

Commander, British Brigade in Portugal
- In office 1662–1663

French Governor of Roussillon
- In office 1654–1658

Lord President of Munster
- In office 1644–1647

Personal details
- Born: c. September 1614 Inchiquin, County Clare
- Died: 9 September 1673 (aged 58–59) Rostellan, County Cork
- Resting place: St Mary's Cathedral, Limerick
- Spouse: Elizabeth St Leger (1635–his death)

Military service
- Rank: Lieutenant-General
- Battles/wars: Piedmontese Civil War; Irish Confederate Wars; Liscarroll; Cashel; Knocknanuss; Franco-Spanish War (1635–1659); Naples expedition; Portuguese Restoration War

Murrough MacDermod O'Brien, 1st Earl of Inchiquin, (Note: Also known as Murchadh na dTóiteán, or "Murrough the Burner") September 1614 – 9 September 1673, was an Irish nobleman and soldier from Munster. Brought up a Protestant, he helped secure Ireland for Parliament during the Wars of the Three Kingdoms, but later joined the exiled Charles II.

Following the Irish Rebellion of 1641 and commencement of the Irish Confederate Wars, Charles I appointed Inchiquin governor of Munster. He had some small success, but was hampered by lack of funds. His forces dispersed at the truce of 1643.

Murrough visited Charles I at Oxford in 1644, but found it expedient to submit to the English Parliament the same year as the Parliamentarians being masters of sea, were the only people who could help the Munster Protestants defend themselves against Roman Catholics. He was made President of Munster by Parliament, and sought to enhance his position with the supplies brought to him by Philip Sidney, Lord Lisle (afterwards the 3rd earl of Leicester).

In 1647, Murrough became gradually master of the south of Ireland declaring for Charles II in 1648. He fortified the southern ports against Parliament and made a truce with the Irish Confederates in 1648. He was joined by Duke of Ormonde, with whom he got possession of Drogheda and Dundalk. However he lost influence in Munster, which revolted after Oliver Cromwell's landing in 1649. He captured and attempted to hold Kilmallock in late 1649, but bowing to the inevitable and after retiring west of the River Shannon he left Ireland for France in early 1650.

Made one of the royal council and created Earl of Inchiquin in 1654; Murrough served under the French in Catalonia in 1654. In 1656 he was involved in the Sexby plot to assassinate Oliver Cromwell and restore the Monarchy. In 1660 he was taken prisoner by the Algerines, and was ransomed the same year. He became high steward of Queen Henrietta Maria's household, and retired to Ireland living quietly after 1663.

== Birth and origins ==
Murrough was born in September 1614, (Note: According to the legal documents relating to his wardship he was born in September 1614, although others suggest sometime between 1615 and 1616) eldest son of Dermod O'Brien, 5th Baron Inchiquin (1594–1624) and Ellen, eldest daughter of Sir Edmond Fitzgerald of Cloyne. His father was the 5th Baron Inchiquin. His father's family claimed descent from Brian Boru, High King of Ireland in the early 11th century. His mother came from a cadet branch of the FitzGerald dynasty. His surviving siblings included Honoria (1612–1655?), Mary (1615–after 1650), who later married Michael Boyle (archbishop of Armagh), Henry who became a Royalist Lieutenant-colonel (died 1645), Christopher who became a Confederate Lieutenant-colonel (died 1664), and Ann. He also had an illegitimate half-brother, Murtough O'Brien (1620–1674), who ended his career as a general in the Spanish army.

== Early life ==
His grandfather and namesake Murrough O'Brien, 4th Baron Inchiquin was killed in July 1597 at the passage of the Erne, fighting for Queen Elizabeth I. It appears from an inquisition taken after the death of his father that Inchiquin was born in September 1614. He became the 6th Baron on the death of his father in 1624; his wardship was given to Patrick FitzMaurice, and the custody of his property to Sir William St. Leger, Lord President of Munster, whose daughter Elizabeth he married. As part of a deliberate government policy, unlike his Gaelic Irish contemporaries and the rest of his family, he was brought up as a Protestant. He had a special livery of his lands in 1636 and afterwards went to study war in the French army, which was engaged in a bitter struggle against the Habsburg Empire. He returned in 1639, and prudently yielded to Thomas Wentworth, 1st Earl of Strafford's high-handed scheme for the colonisation of County Clare. In a letter to Wentworth, Charles I took notice of this, and directed that he should not "in course of plantation have the fourth part of his lands in that county taken from him as from the other the natives there. On 2 April 1640 he was made vice-president of Munster and sat as a peer in the Irish Parliament which Strafford held that year.

== Marriage ==
In 1635 Inchiquin married Elizabeth St Leger (1618–1685).

They had three sons:

1. William (1638–1692)
2. Charles, who was killed at the Siege of Maastricht (1673)
3. John, who served in the Dutch army under the Prince of Orange

—and four daughters:

1. Elizabeth (died 1688), who married at least twice
2. Honora (died 1718), who married Theobald Bourke, 3rd Baron Bourke of Brittas (died after 1691)
3. Mary (died after 1704), who married Henry Boyle and their son became Henry, 1st Earl of Shannon
4. Finola, who died childless

== The Irish Rebellion ==
The great Irish rebellion began on 23 October 1641, and in December Inchiquin accompanied the president in an expedition against the Leinster rebels who were harassing Waterford and Tipperary. All the prisoners taken in a fight near Carrick-on-Suir were executed by martial law. In April 1642, during the siege of Cork by Viscount Muskerry with four thousand men, Inchiquin, "one of the young and noble-spirited commanders," led a sally of two troops of horse and three hundred musketeers, which broke up the Irish camp for a time. Muskerry left baggage and provisions behind, and Inchiquin was able to ship guns and to take two castles on the west side of Cork harbour which had annoyed the navigation. St. Leger died on 2 July, and Inchiquin became the legal governor of Munster, as he announced to the lord justices before the end of the month. David Barry, 1st Earl of Barrymore, was associated with him in the civil government but died on Michaelmas day. Alexander Forbes, 11th Lord Forbes, with Hugh Peters as his chaplain, landed at Kinsale early in July with forces provided by adventurers in England; but he paid no attention to Inchiquin's request for help, and he affected nothing. On 20 August Inchiquin, accompanied by Barrymore, Viscount Boyle of Kinalmeaky, and Roger Boyle, Lord Broghill, with only two thousand foot and four hundred horse, overthrew General Garret Barry at Battle of Liscarrol with seven thousand foot and fifteen hundred horse; but he lacked means to improve his victory, though seven hundred are said to have fallen on one side and only twelve on the other. He was himself wounded in the head and hand.

Richard Boyle, 1st Earl of Cork, and his sons did much to preserve the counties of Cork and Waterford, and Inchiquin co-operated with them, but not cordially. The difficulty was to support an army on any terms. In November 1642 Inchiquin seized all the tobacco in the hands of the patentees at Cork, Youghal, and Kinsale, and no compensation was paid until after the restoration. The cattle and corn in the districts under his control were taken of course. The king had no money to give, and the English Parliament had neither time to attend to Ireland nor money to entrust to unsafe hands. Inchiquin gave a commission to the commandant at Youghal as early as 26 July 1642 to execute martial law thereupon both soldiers and civilians, and his dealings with the town are recorded in the "Council Book". The raw material of soldiers was abundant, for fighting was now the only industry; but there were no means of paying them. Yet the English Parliament sent men to Ireland without arms, for no purpose, wrote Inchiquin to James Butler, 1st Duke of Ormonde, "unless it be to plot that these men shall with jawbones kill so many rebels". At the end of May 1643 he took the field with four thousand foot and four hundred horse, but could only threaten Kilmallock, "for want of provisions and money for the officers", and he begged the Earl of Cork to lend or borrow £300 for victualling Youghal. While threatening Kinsale himself, he sent one detachment as far as Tralee, who had to subsist on a country then in Irish hands. Another small force was sent to Fermoy, but suffered a crushing defeat at Cloghleagh on 4 June from a body of horse under James Tuchet, 3rd Earl of Castlehaven, who had been specially sent by the Kilkenny confederation.

Muskerry threatened the county of Waterford, and Inchiquin, according to his own account, intrigued with him until he was in a position to fight. The Irish leader offered to spare Youghal and its district if Cappoquin and Lismore surrendered at once; otherwise, he would burn both places. By a mixture of threats and promises, Inchiquin induced him to say that he would withdraw if Cappoquin and Lismore were not taken by a certain day. Until that date had passed he was not to be attacked. Inchiquin had so garrisoned Cappoquin as to make it safe for a much longer time, and the Earl of Cork's Lismore Castle was also well prepared. The situation was maintained with little sincerity on either side until Cork himself landed with orders from Charles I to promote a truce. Active hostilities ceased, and Muskerry, who had been outwitted, tried to be even with Inchiquin by telling the king that he designed to betray the two towns to the Irish – a statement without foundation. "If ever", he wrote to an officer who had been present during the whole period, "I did anything towards the defence of Munster against the Irish, this was what I had cause to brag of".

== Cessation of arms ==
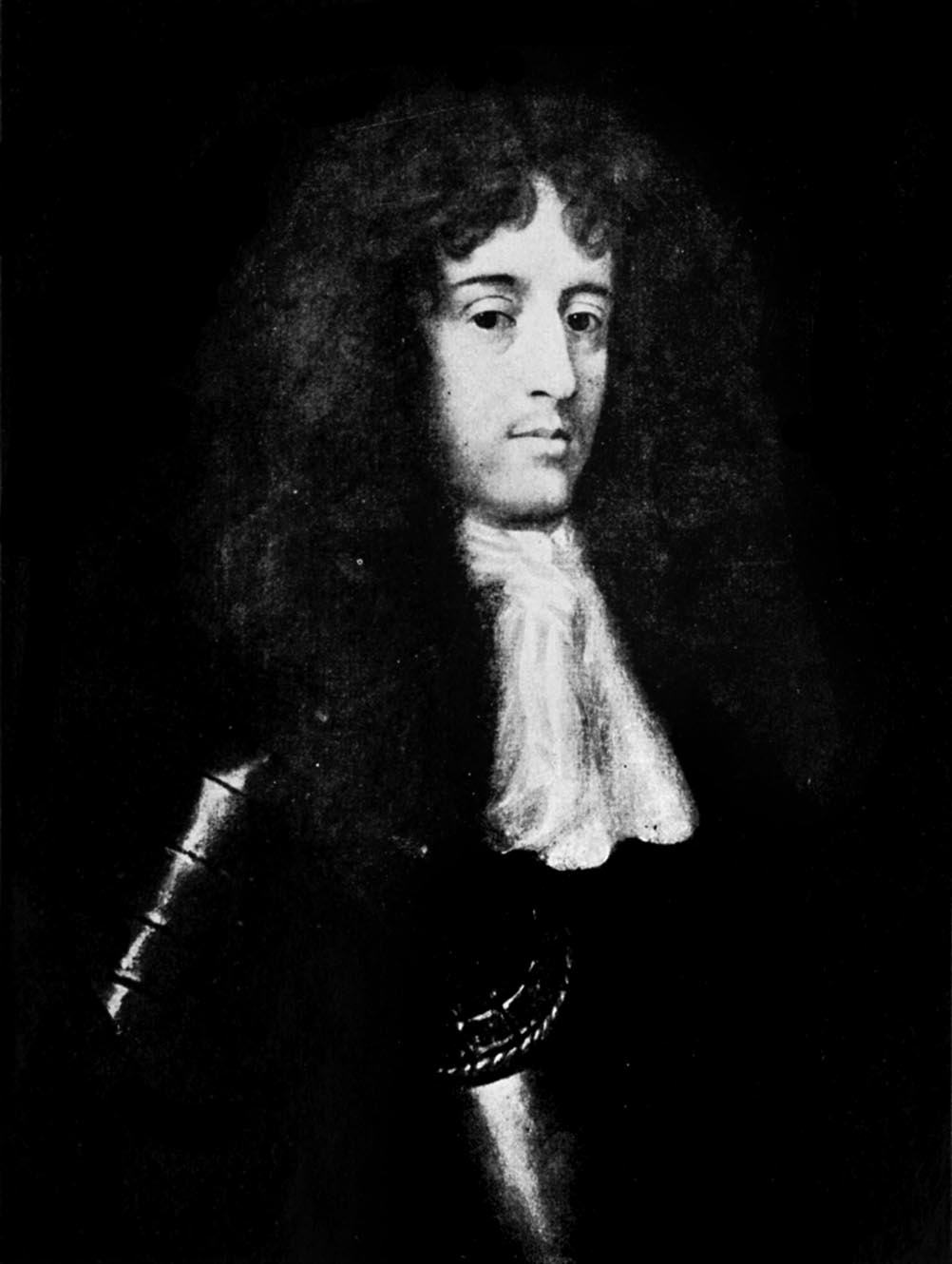
Murrough O'Brien, Earl of Inchiquin

The cessation of arms for a year, which Ormonde, at the king's command, concluded with the confederates on 15 September 1643, was formally approved by Inchiquin in a document which he signed along with Marquess of Clanricarde and many other persons of distinction, but he did not think it really favourable to the cause of the Irish Protestants. The immediate result was that a great part of the force under his orders was sent to serve the king in England, two regiments being assigned to Lord Hopton in Sussex, and the rest scattered under various leaders. Eight hundred of Inchiquin's men, described as "native Irish rebels", landed at Weymouth, under his brother Henry, and some were hanged as such (see Ordinance of no quarter to the Irish), though their old general was by that time serving the English Parliamentary cause. His own regiment of horse went over before the cessation, and was present before Gloucester in August and September, but did little except plunder the country.

== Parliamentary Allegiance ==
Inchiquin went to Oxford early in February 1644, his main object being to get the king's commission as president of Munster; but a formal promise had already been given to Jerome Weston, 2nd Earl of Portland, who received a patent for life on 1 March. Ormonde was against slighting a man who had done great service in Ireland for the sake of one who had done nothing at all, but his advice was neglected, and Inchiquin was dismissed with fair words. He had a warrant from the king for an earldom, but this he forbore to use. He left Oxford after a stay of about a fortnight, apparently in tolerable humour, but it was soon known in Ireland that he came discontented from court. What he saw at Oxford was not likely to raise his estimate of the king's power; and in any case, the English Parliament were masters of the sea, and the only people who could help the Protestants of Munster. A visit to Dublin on his way did not change his opinion, and in July he and his officers urged the king, in a formal address, to make peace with his parliament. At the same time, they called upon the houses to furnish supplies for prosecuting the war against the Irish, In November 1642 Inchiquin had told Ormonde that he was no roundhead, and in August 1645 he assured his brother-in-law, Michael Boyle, the future primate and chancellor, that he would waive all dependence on the English Parliament if he could see safety for the Protestants by any other means; and between these dates he made many appeals to Ormonde not to desert the Protestants for an Irish alliance, exposing the "apparent practice of the Irish papists to extirpate the Protestant religion, which I am able to demonstrate and convince them of, if it were to any purpose to accuse them of anything".

In June 1644 Inchiquin was going to leave for England, but Ormonde advised him to wait until he had cleared himself from Muskerry's charges about the 'Cappoquin business'. During the next few weeks he edged away both from the Confederate Catholics and from Ormonde, and on 25 August 1644 he informed the latter that a parliamentary ship had reached Youghal, that the town had embraced that cause, and that he should have to do the same; and he entreated him to put himself at the head of the Protestant interest. In August Inchiquin expelled nearly all the Catholics from Cork, Youghal, and Kinsale; and they were allowed to take only as much property as they could carry on their persons. "All the Irish inhabitants" are the words used by this chief of the O'Briens.

The English parliament made Inchiquin president of Munster, and he continued to act without reference to Portland or to Ormonde, who was the king's lord-lieutenant. Receiving no supplies from England, he managed to keep the garrisons together, and, although he had opposed the general armistice, was forced to make a truce with the Irish in the winter of 1644/45. The Siege of Duncannon, which Laurence Esmonde, Lord Esmonde held for the English Parliament, was nevertheless proceeded with; and at its surrender, on 18 March 1646, it was found that Esmond had been acting under Inchiquin's directions, although the fort is not in Munster. The truce expired 10 April 1645, and Castlehaven at once invaded Munster with six thousand men, reducing most of the detached strongholds easily, capturing Inchiquin's brother Henry, and ravaging the country to the walls of Cork. Inchiquin was active but too weak to do much; and on 16 April Castlehaven came before Youghal, which was valiantly defended by Broghill. The latter took the offensive early in May with his cavalry, and won a battle near Castlelyons. Inchiquin sent in many supplies by sea from Cork, in which he had the help of Vice-admiral John Crowther's squadron; a larger convoy was sent by the English Parliament after the Battle of Naseby, and in September Broghill, who had been to England for help, finally relieved the place. At the end of the year, Inchiquin induced his kinsman, Barnabas O'Brien, 6th Earl of Thomond, to admit parliamentary troops into Bunratty Castle, near Limerick, but it was retaken in the following July.

== Campaign of 1647 ==
On 5 January 1646 the English House of Commons voted that Ireland should be governed by a single person, and on 21 January that that person should be Philip Sidney, Lord Lisle, who had already seen service in that country. Ormonde's treaty with the Confederate Catholics, to which Inchiquin was no party, was ratified on 29 July 1646 but was denounced by Archbishop Giovanni Battista Rinuccini and the clergy adhering to him. It had, however, the effect of checking active warfare in Munster. Lisle did not land at Cork until March 1647, when he brought money, arms, and a considerable body of men. He did little or nothing, and, his appointment expiring in April, Inchiquin produced his own commission under the great seal of England, and declined to acknowledge any other. The officers of the army pronounced in their old leader's favour, and amusing details of the proceedings are given by Bellings. Broghill opposed Inchiquin, but Admiral Crowther took his part, and Lisle was not sorry to get away on any terms. Inchiquin remained "in entire possession of the command, and in greater reputation than he was before", He reported to parliament in person on 7 May, and received the thanks of the House of Commons.

Inchiquin now proceeded to reconquer the districts which Castlehaven had overrun. Cappoquin and Dromana, against which he had cherished designs since 1642, were easily taken. There was a little fighting at Dungarvan, and twenty English redcoats, who had deserted to the Irish, were hanged; but on the whole Inchiquin's men thought him too lenient. This was early in May, and he took the field again in midsummer. On 12 August he reported to William Lenthall, Speaker of the English Parliament, that he had taken many castles and vast quantities of cattle. A detachment crossed the River Shannon and Bunratty Castle was burned by its garrison, though it had taken the Confederate Catholics much pain to win. "We stormed and burned the Abbey of Adare, held by the rebels, where four friars were burned and three took prisoners".

On 12 September he attacked the Rock of Cashel, the strong position of which had tempted many persons of both sexes to take refuge upon it, with their valuables. Failing to make a breach with his guns, Inchiquin piled up turf against the wall of the enclosure and set fire to it. It was the dry season, and the heat disabled the defenders, who were crowded within a narrow space. The rock was carried by assault, and during the sacking of Cashel no quarter was given to anyone. About thirty priests and friars were among the slain. According to Ludlow three thousand were slaughtered, "the priests being taken even from under the altar". According to Father Sail, who was a native of Cashel, Inchiquin donned the archepiscopal mitre.

At the beginning of November, fearing a juncture between the Munster chief and the victorious Michael Jones, the Confederates sent Lord Taafe into the county of Cork with six thousand foot and twelve hundred horse. Inchiquin at once returned from Tipperary, leaving a garrison in Cahir, and came up with the invader at the hill of Knocknanuss, about three miles (5 km) east of Kanturk. In a curious letter, he offered to forego all advantage of ground, trusting to the goodness of his cause, and to fight in the open, although his force was inferior. No answer was given, and Inchiquin attacked and won the Battle of Knocknanuss on 13 November. Taafe lost two-thirds of his men and nearly all his arms, while the victor had only about 150 killed. Inchiquin received the thanks of the English Parliament, and was voted £1,000 to buy horses, but he was already distrusted.

== Return to Royal Service ==
For a time Inchiquin was master of the south of Ireland, and no one dared meet him in the field. At the beginning of February 1648, he took Carrick with a small force, threatened Waterford, and levied contributions to the walls of Kilkenny. He returned to Cork at the end of the month and persuaded his officers to sign a remonstrance to the English House of Commons as to its neglect of the Munster army. This was received on 27 March, and it was at first decided to send three members to confer with the discontented general, but on 14 April came news that he had actually declared for the king. The three members were recalled, all commissions made to Inchiquin revoked, and officers and soldiers forbidden to obey him. He managed to keep his army together, while insisting on the necessity for Ormonde's return to Ireland, and even sent an officer to Edinburgh with a proposal for joining the Scots with six thousand men. Cork, Kinsale, Youghal, Baltimore, Castlehaven, Crookhaven, and Dungarvan were in his hands, and he so fortified these harbours that no parliamentary ship could anchor in any one of them.

In spite of Rinuccini, Inchiquin concluded a truce with the Confederate Catholics on 22 May, and Ormonde converted this into a peace in the following January. Owen Roe O'Neill advanced in July as far as Nenagh, his object being to reach Kerry, whose mountains were suited to his peculiar tactics, and whose unguarded inlets would give him the means of communicating with the continent; but Inchiquin, forced him back to Ulster. Ormonde, who was still the legal lord-lieutenant, landed at Cork on 30 September, and he and Inchiquin thenceforth worked together, Clanricarde and Lord Preston siding with them as against the Nuncio Rinuccini and the Ulster general O'Neill.

The Munster army had been buoyed up with the hopes of pay at Ormonde's arrival, but he had only thirty pistoles, and some of the disappointed cavalry left their colours with a view to joining either Jones or O'Neill. Inchiquin quelled the mutiny with great skill and courage, and Ormonde could only promise that the king would pay all arrears as soon as he could.

== Conclusion of Second English Civil War ==
In January 1649 Prince Rupert's fleet was on the Munster coast, and Inchiquin saw Maurice at Kinsale about the contemplated visit of the Prince of Wales to Ireland. He was still fearful lest a royalist government of his province should lead to the oppression of the English Protestants, who would with good cause despair "of ever having any justice against an Irishman for anything delivered him on trust". The conclusion of the peace between Ormonde and the Confederate Catholics, the execution of the king, and the flight of Rinuccini followed close upon each other at the beginning of 1649. O'Neill, acting in concert with the bulk of the priests, refused to accept the peace, while Monro and his Scots made professions of royalism.

Inchiquin received a commission from Ormonde as lieutenant-general, made himself master of Drogheda, and prepared to besiege Dundalk. George Monck, 1st Duke of Albemarle, was governor of this town, and he had just concluded an armistice for three months with O'Neill. On 1 July Inchiquin captured the convoy of ammunition which Monck sent to O'Neill's assistance, and the garrison of Dundalk then compelled their leader to surrender. After this Newry, Trim, and the neighbouring strongholds were soon taken, and Inchiquin returned to the royalist camp near Dublin.

Ormonde, who now seemed to have Ireland almost at his feet, sent him with a large force of horse to Munster, where he was now lord-president by Charles II's commission, and where Cromwell was expected to land. Inchiquin was thus absent from the fatal Battle of Rathmines, fought on 2 August 1649, after which most of his old soldiers joined the parliamentarians under Jones.

== Cromwellian Invasion ==
Cromwell landed on 15 August 1649, and stormed Drogheda on 12 September. It was evident that nothing could resist him, and the Munster garrisons, who had Protestant sympathies, began to fall away from Inchiquin. A conspiracy of certain officers to seize his person was frustrated, and he gained admission to Youghal while the conqueror was busy at Wexford. Inchiquin returned to Leinster at the end of October, and on 1 November was at the head of some three thousand men, chiefly horse, and he advanced through the hills from Carlow to attack about half that number of Cromwell's soldiers who had been left sick in Dublin.

The Cromwellians, many of whom had but imperfectly recovered, had a skirmish on the shore at Glascarrig between Arklow and Wexford where they succeeded in fending off their assailants. At that moment Munster revolted from Inchiquin. Admiral Robert Blake's blockade having been temporarily raised by bad weather, Rupert escaped from the Irish coast. Cromwell wrote that Cork and Youghal had submitted. The other port towns followed suit, and Broghill succeeded to most of Inchiquin's influence in Munster. The English or Protestant inhabitants of Cork, "out of a sense of the good service and tender care of the Lord Inchiquin over them," asked Cromwell to see his estate secured to him and his heirs, but to this the victor "forbore to make any answer".

On 24 November 1649 Inchiquin, at the head of a force consisting; chiefly of Ulster Irish, made an attempt upon Carrick-on-Suir, but was repulsed with great loss. He then retired westward, and obtained possession of Kilmallock, but had only some four hundred men with him. On 19 December he wrote to Ormonde concerning the Clonmacnoise bishops: "I am already condemned among them; and I believe your Excellency has but a short reprieve, for they cannot trust you unless you go to mass". In January 1650 he withdrew into Kerry, and raised some forces there, with which he returned to the neighbourhood of Kilmallock about the beginning of March. Henry Cromwell joined Broghill, and defeated these new levies which consisted chiefly of Englishmen towards the end of the month; and Inchiquin, after plundering most of the county Limerick, crossed the Shannon into Clare "with more cows than horses".

Neither Ormonde nor Inchiquin had now much to do in Ireland, and neither henceforth appeared to the east of the Shannon. The Catholic hierarchy had met in December 1649 at Clonmacnoise; but they could never work cordially with a Protestant chief like Ormonde, and their object was to obtain the protection of some foreign prince. In their declaration made at Jamestown on 12 August 1650, they accused Inchiquin of betraying Munster, and charged both him and Ormonde with spending their time west of the Shannon "in play, pleasure, and great merriment". As neither Ormonde nor Inchiquin had an army, and the walled towns refused to admit them, there was little they could do. Ormonde was told that he was distrusted solely on account of his relations with Inchiquin, while the latter was assured that he alone, as of the "most ancient Irish blood," could fill O'Neill's place in the popular esteem. Bagwell wrote that Clarendon not unfairly summed up the case by saying that "when these two lords had communicated each to other (as they quickly did) the excellent addresses which had been made to them, and agreed together how to draw on and encourage the proposers, that they might discover as much of their purposes as possible, they easily found their design was to be rid of them both".

The choice of Heber MacMahon, Bishop of Clogher, as O'Neill's successor brought disaster, and Ormonde, accompanied by Inchiquin and some forty other officers, left Ireland, and, after three weeks' tossing, landed safely at Perros Guirec in Brittany.

== Exile in France ==
Charles II was at this time in Holland, and Inchiquin was called upon to defend himself against many charges brought by Sir Lewis Dyve, but soon withdrawn as without foundation. Charles investigated the matter in Paris after his escape from Worcester, and on 2 April 1652 wrote himself to Inchiquin to declare his confidence in him. On 11 May he was made one of the royal council, "of whose company," Edward Hyde wrote, "I am glad; who is, in truth, a gallant gentleman of good parts and great industry, and a temper fit to struggle with the affairs on all sides that we are to contend with". But neither the Queen mother Henrietta Maria, Jermyn, nor Wilmot, Earl of Rochester liked the new appointment. In 1653 Inchiquin sought the command of all Irish soldiers in France; but this was opposed by the Irish clergy, who told the nuncio that he was a "murderer of priests, friars, and such like"; but he had either one or two regiments under him. In May 1654 he received the earldom which he had spurned ten years before. At this time the exiled king's council consisted of eleven persons, divided into two parties. The majority consisted of Ormonde, Rochester, Percy, Inchiquin, Taafe, and Hyde, who controlled the whole policy. Henrietta Maria, the Duke of York, Rupert, the Duke of Buckingham, and Jermyn were the minority.

In October 1653, Inchiquin shipped his regiment from Marseilles and it was destroyed in Henry, Duke of Guise's expedition to Naples. He himself went to Catalonia, where he became governor of the districts which still adhered to France, and occupied himself with some success in seducing Irish soldiers from the Spanish to the French service. He was back in Paris early in 1655, Charles II being then resident at Cologne.

Inchiquin remained in Paris, or near it, till the summer of 1656, and was more or less engaged in the Sexby plot. A Colonel Clancy, from his name probably a native of Clare, was employed by him as a secret agent in London, and Henry Cromwell had information that Inchiquin himself was to command in Ireland. Charles II, who was now at Bruges, wished Inchiquin and his Irish soldiers to be at hand, and Hyde favoured all Spanish designs. Inchiquin was in Catalonia during the autumn of 1656, but in Paris again in the summer of 1657. By this time he had joined the Church of Rome, his wife remaining a staunch Protestant, and there were great bickerings. The English Parliamentary envoy William Lockhart says the lady was persecuted, and that he had given her a pass to England without consulting the Protector's government, for fear of the French Protestants, who were witnesses of her sufferings. The great question was as to the custody of her young son, Lord O'Brien, Henrietta Maria and the Catholic party favouring Inchiquin's claim, and the Protestants taking the other side. Lockhart's diplomacy triumphed, and Inchiquin, who had violently carried the boy off from the English embassy, was ordered to restore him on pain of being banished from France and losing all his commissions and allowances. Inchiquin was in Catalonia during the autumn of 1657, but returned to Paris in the following January, having been sent for expressly about his son's business. In April 1658 this son, about whom there had been so much dispute, was among his father's friends in Ireland; but Henry Cromwell sent him away with only a caution.

Inchiquin's own letters during 1658 and 1659 are in a hopeless strain, and he sought employment in any attempt which might be made on England. But Ormonde had been prejudiced against him, and probably his change of religion was fatal to his influence among the Protestant royalists. The negotiations which led to the Peace of the Pyrenees destroyed his chances in Catalonia; but Cardinal Mazarin connived at his going with Count Schomberg to help the Portuguese, and he started for Lisbon in the autumn of 1659. On 20 February 1660 (10 February 1660 Julian calendar) it was known in Paris that he and his son had been taken at sea by the Algerines. The English council wrote on his behalf to the Pasha, and by 23 August (Julian calendar) he was in England, but his son remained in Africa as a hostage. The House of Commons especially recommended the case of both father and son to King Charles II, and on 10 November a warrant was granted to export 7,500 dollars for ransom. Lady Inchiquin petitioned for her husband's release in August, but during the same month Sir Donough O'Brien wrote that she had no mind to see any of his relations "for his being a papist". Inchiquin went to Paris soon after, and returned with Henrietta Maria, of whose household he became high steward. During 1661 he signed the declaration of allegiance to Charles II by Irish Catholic nobility and gentry, notwithstanding any papal sentence or dispensation.

Inchiquin was generally in attendance on the Queen mother, either in London or Paris, and on 23 June 1662 it is noted that "this famous soldier in Ireland" sailed as general-in-chief of the English expeditionary force sent by Charles to help the Portuguese; that he landed at Lisbon on 31 July with two thousand foot and some troops of horse, and that he made a short speech to his men. The Spaniards avoided a battle, and allowed the strangers to waste themselves by long marches and by indulgence in fruit. Inchiquin returned to England in 1663, and seems soon to have gone to Ireland.

== Later life ==
Inchiquin's military career was now closed, and the presidency of Munster, which he had so much coveted, was denied to him on account of his religion, and given to the astute Broghill, now Earl of Orrery. But when the latter went to England in June 1664 he made his old rival vice-president, and they remained friends afterwards. Inchiquin seems to have lived quietly in Ireland during the greater part of his remaining years. In 1666 he was made a magistrate for Clare; but Rostellan on Cork Harbour, became the favourite residence of his family.

Henrietta Maria finally departed into France in 1665, and when she was gone he had little to draw him to London. When Orrery was impeached in 1668, the third article against him was that he had unjustly used his presidential power to secure Rostellan for Inchiquin, whose eldest son had married his daughter Margaret. As the impeachment was dropped, it is hard to say how far Orrery's defence was good. Part of it was that Fitzgerald of Cloyne, the other claimant, was a "known notorious papist, and the house a stronghold near the sea".

Earl of Inchequin Restoration Act 1660
- Act of Parliament
- Parliament of England
- Long title: An Act for restoring unto Murrough, alias Morgan, Earl of Insiquin, all his Honours, Manors, Lands, and Tenements, in Ireland, whereof he was in Possession on the 23th of October, 1641, or at any Time since.
- Citation: 12 Cha. 2. c. 3 Pr.
- Territorial extent: England and Wales

Dates
- Royal assent: 13 September 1660
- Commencement: 25 April 1660 (Note: Start of session.)

Status: Current legislation

In the Cromwellian Act of Settlement, 12 August 1652, Inchiquin was excepted by name from pardon for life or estate. The Earl of Inchequin Restoration Act 1660 (12 Cha. 2. c. 3), a private act was passed in September 1660 which restored him to all his honours and lands in Ireland, and this was confirmed by the Act of Settlement in 1662. An estate of about 60,000 acres (240 km^{2}) in Clare, Limerick, Tipperary, and Cork was thus secured; £8,000 was given him out of the treasury, in consideration of his losses and sufferings. He was compensated at the rate of £10 a day for his arrears as general in Munster before 5 June 1649, and received several other more or less lucrative grants.

== Death ==
The Capuchin Père Gamache, who wrote during Inchiquin's life, says his banishment, imprisonment, and other troubles were a judgment for his role in the religious persecution of the Catholic Church in Ireland; "and now he continues his penitence with a Dutch wife, who is furious against the Catholic religion, and keeps her husband in a state of continual penance". In fact, his wife Elizabeth St Leger was only half-Dutch: her mother Gertrude de Vries was a native of Dordrecht. By a will made in 1673, Inchiquin left a legacy to the Franciscans and for other pious uses, and he died on 9 September 1674. By his own desire he was buried in St Mary's Cathedral, Limerick, probably in the O'Brien tomb. The commandant gave full military honours, and salutes were fired at his funeral, but there is no inscription or other record. His widow (Elizabeth, daughter of Sir William St. Leger) survived him till 1685, leaving directions for her burial in the church which her father had built at Doneraile. Inchiquin left four daughters and three sons, the eldest William inherited the earldom.

Family tree

Murrough O'Brien with wife, parents, and other selected relatives. (Note: This family tree is based on a drawn pedigree (Moody, Martin & Byrne 1984, p. 153). "O'Briens ..." and on written genealogies of the barons and earls of Inchiquin(Cokayne 1929, pp. 50–54). Also see the list of children in the text.)

Murrough; 4th Baron; 1562–1597	Mabel; Nugent
Dermod; 5th Baron; 1594–1624	Ellen; FitzGerald	William; St Leger; 1586–1642; Lord President of Munster
Murrough; 1st Earl; 1614–1674	Elizabeth; St Leger; 1618–1685
Margaret; Boyle d. 1683	William; 2nd Earl; 1640–1692	Elizabeth; Brydges d. 1718
William; 3rd Earl; 1662–1719	Mary; Villiers d. 1753

Legend

XXX	Subject of the article	XXX	Barons & earls of Inchiquin

== Sources ==
- Burke, Bernard (1883). A Genealogical History of the Dormant, Abeyant, Forfeited and Extinct Peerages of the British Empire (New ed.). London: Harrison. OCLC 499232768.
- Burke, Bernard; Burke, Ashworth Peter (1915). A Genealogical and Heraldic History of the Peerage and Baronetage, the Privy Council, Knightage and Companionage (77th ed.). London: Harrison. OCLC 1155471554.
- Chisholm, Hugh, ed. (1911). "Inchiquin, Murrough O'Brien, 1st Earl of" . Encyclopædia Britannica. Vol. 14 (11th ed.). Cambridge University Press. p. 354.
- Cokayne, George Edward (1929). Doubleday, H. A. (ed.). The complete peerage of England, Scotland, Ireland, Great Britain and the United Kingdom, extant, extinct, or dormant. Vol. VII (2nd ed.). London: St Catherine Press. – Hussey to Lincolnshire
- "Irish Rivers.—No.11. The Bride—A Tributary of the Blackwater". The Dublin University Magazine. 27. William Curry, Jun. and Co.: pp. 38–39 January–June 1846.
- Cromwell, Oliver (1897). "Letters CXV & CXVI". In Carlyle, Thomas (ed.). Oliver Cromwell's letters and speeches with elucidations. Vol. 2. London: Chapman and Hall.
- Little, Patrick (2004). "O'Brien, Murrough, first earl of Inchiquin (1614–1674)". In Matthew, Colin; Harrison, Brian (eds.). Oxford Dictionary of National Biography. Vol. 41. New York: Oxford University Press. pp. 373–380. ISBN 0-19-861391-1.
- Moody, Theodore William; Martin, F. X.; Byrne, Francis John, eds. (1984). A New History of Ireland. Vol. IX:Maps, Genealogies, Lists. Oxford: Oxford University Press. ISBN 0-19-821745-5.
- O'Hart, John (1887) [1st pub. 1887]. The Irish Gentry When Cromwell Came to Ireland. Dublin: James Duffy & Co. OCLC 1047480618.
- Smith, Charles (1815) [1st pub. 1750]. The Ancient and Present State of the County and City of Cork. Vol. II. Cork: John Connor. OCLC 868875051. – History

Attribution:

- This article incorporates text from a publication now in the public domain: Bagwell, Richard (1888). "O'Brien, Murrough (1614–1674)". In Stephen, Leslie (ed.). Dictionary of National Biography. Vol. 16. London: Smith, Elder & Co. pp. 320–327. Endnotes
  - Carte's Life of the Duke of Ormonde, especially appendix of letters in vol. iii.
  - Russell and Prendergast's Report on Carte MSS. in 32nd Rep. of Deputy-Keeper of Public Records
  - Clarendon's Hist. of the Rebellion; Clarendon State Papers, Cal. of Clarendon State Papers
  - Thurloe State Papers
  - Cal. of State Papers, Dom.
  - Council-Books of Youghal and Kinsale, ed. Caulfield
  - Lismore Papers, ed. Grosart, 2nd ser.
  - Rushworth's Collections;
  - Rinuccini's Embassy in Ireland, Engl. transl.
  - Whitelocke's Memorials
  - Confederation and War in Ireland, and Contemporary Hist, of Affairs in Ireland, ed. Gilbert
  - Warr of Ireland, ed. E. H., Dublin, 1873
  - Orrery State Papers and Life, by Morrice
  - Castlehaven's Memoirs, ed. 1815
  - C. P. Meehan, Confederation of Kilkenny
  - Carlyle's Cromwell
  - Walsh's Hist, of the Remonstrance
  - Kennet's Register and Chronicle
  - Somers Tracts, vols. v. and vi.
  - Lodge's Irish Peerage, ed. Archdall, vol. ii. and vi.
  - Biographic Universelle, art. ' Schomberg
  - Murphy's Cromwell in Ireland
  - Smith's Hist, of Cork
  - Lenihan's Hist, of Limerick
  - Père Cyprien de Gamaches's narrative in Court and Times of Charles I, 1648, vol. ii.
  - At the time that the DNB article was written by Richard Bagwell, Lord Inchiquin had many manuscripts at Dromoland, co. Clare, including transcripts from the Crosbie Papers, which relate chiefly to Kerry during the days of Inchiquin's power in Munster.

Peerage of Ireland
New creation	Earl of Inchiquin; 1654–1674	Succeeded by William O'Brien
Preceded by Dermod O'Brien	Baron Inchiquin; 1624–1674	Succeeded by William O'Brien
