= Peter Wadding =

Irish Jesuit theologian

Peter Wadding (c. 1581 – 13 September 1644) was an Irish Jesuit theologian.

== Life ==
Born at Waterford in 1581 or 1583, he was son of Thomas Wadding and his wife, Mary Walsh. Both father and mother are said to have been of good family. According to Leger's Life of Archbishop Walsh, Peter had five brothers who also became Jesuits: Luke, Thomas, Michael, Daniel, and Walter. The Franciscan Luke Wadding, and the Jesuit Ambrose Wadding, were his cousins.

Wadding studied humanities for seven years in Ireland, and then proceeded to Douai, where he graduates M.A., and subsequently doctor of both laws as well as of divinity. He was admitted to the Company of Jesus on 24 October 1601 by Father Oliveræus, the provincial of Flanders, and commenced his novitiate at Tournai on 23 November 1601. When he joined the novitiate at Tournai, he gave his birth year as 1583.

Eventually he became professor of theology first at Louvain, and then at Antwerp. In 1629 Wadding was transferred to Prague, becoming professor of theology and chancellor of the university.

The last years of his life were spent at Graz, where he was professor of theology and also chancellor. He died there on 13 September 1644.

== Works ==
While at Antwerp Wadding had a controversy with the famous Arminian Simon Episcopius. The disputations of both were published in Dutch after their death in one volume, entitled Twee brieven van den gelerden Peter Wading in sijn level Jesuit tot Antwerpen: d’eene, van den Regel des Geloofs’ d’andere,. van den beeldendienst … Amsterdam, 1649, 4to (British Museum). On 30 November 1632 Wadding completed a Brevis Refutatio Calumniarum quas Collegio Societatis Jesu Pragensi impegit scriptor famosi libelli cui titulus “Flagellum Jesuitarum”, præsertim in negotio Academiæ Pragnensis … Nissa, 1634, 4to. This was followed by a solid work of 656 pages, entitled R.P. Petri Wadingi Waterfordiensis Hibernie Soc. Jes S. Theologiæ professoris, olim in Lovaniensi nunc in Pragensi Academia professoris Tractatus de Incarnation, Antwerp, 1636, 8vo. In the following year he published an Oratio Pragæ dicta, congratulating Ferdinand III on his election as emperor.

Besides the works mentioned, the updated 1643 bibliography of Jesuit writings known under the name of Pedro de Ribadeneira says Wadding published under a pseudonym, Carmina varia et alia spectantia ad disciplinas humaniores, and Tractatus aliquos contra Hæreticos (Ribadeneira, ‘’Bibl. Script. Soc. Jesu’’’, 1643, p.402). A manuscript volume in the Bodleian Library contains various other treatises by him (Tanner, p.744).

According to Edmund Hogan, SJ, Peter Wadding's writings are as follows:

1. Carmina varia et alia spectantia ad Disciplinas Humaniores
2. Tractatus aliquot contra Haereticos
3. Brevis Refutatio Calumniarum quas Collegio Societatis Jesu Pragensi impegit Scriptor famosi libelli cui titulus "Flagellum Jesuiticum," praesertim in negotio Academiae Pragensis, 1634, 4to
4. De Incarnatione, 4to, 1634
5. Oratio Pragae dicta in Ferdinandi III. Ratisbonensibus Comitiis in Caesarem electi Inauguratione
6. De Contractibus, 4to, 1644
7. Epistola de Regula Fidei (published in Latin and translated into Dutch)
8. Epistola de Cultu Imaginum (published in Latin and translated into Dutch)

as well as these manuscripts:

- Thirty-six various treatises by him in the Bodleian Library Hyperoo Bodl., number 16
- Examen et Purgatio Petri Wadingi, in Imperial Libr. at Vienna

== Bibliography ==
- O'Dea, Paul (1941). "Father Peter Wadding, S. J.: Chancellor of the University of Prague 1629-1641". Studies: An Irish Quarterly Review. 30 (119): 337–348. JSTOR 30098132.
