= Michael Wadding (priest) =

Irish Jesuit priest and missionary

Michael Wadding S.J. (1591–1644), also known as Miguel Godinez, was an Irish Jesuit priest and missionary to New Spain. A mystical theologian, he was born at Waterford, Kingdom of Ireland, in 1591, and died in Mexico, New Spain, where he had spent over 20 years as a missionary, on 12 or 18 December 1644. (Note: The Jesuit historian, Alegre, remarks that, according to the archives of his ecclesiastical province, Wadding died on 18 December, and not the 12th, as is generally stated in agreement with Father La Reguera.)

== Life ==
Wadding was the son of Marie Walsh and Thomas Wadding, Mayor of Waterford. He had three brothers who also became Jesuits: Peter Wadding (c. 1581 - 1644), Thomas (a.k.a. Guadin, 1594-1615), and Luke (1593-1651). In addition, at least two of his first cousins also became men of the cloth: Ambrose (1583-1619) a Jesuit and Luke Wadding, the well-known Franciscan. For two years he studied at the Irish seminary of Salamanca, where he took the name of Miguel Godinez, by which he is best known in Spanish sources. He entered the Society of Jesus on 15 April 1609. After two years at the novitiate in Villagarcia, he pursued his theological studies and was ordained a priest, after which he obtained permission to go to the Jesuit missions of Mexico.

Wadding was then assigned to serve in the Jesuit mission in Sinaloa, and in 1620 he worked among the Mayan people and the Tepehuán; he also took charge of the Comicaris, and, at the cost of much labour, won over the Basiroas, whom he joined to Christian tribes. He related in his Teologia mistica (I, 3, VIII), as one who endured them himself, the privations and sufferings undergone by the missionaries. He made his profession of the Jesuit fourth vow on 26 August 1626. He taught for several years in various colleges in Mexico, including San Ildefonso and the Jesuit Colegio Máximo. In 1642 he became involved in the Spanish Inquisition in Mexico as a counselor and adviser.

Wadding was distinguished by his profound knowledge of the supernatural states and by rare prudence in the direction of souls. He served as the confessor to two nuns in Puebla de los Ángeles, who are considered mystics, a Carmelite nun, Isabel de la Encarnación, and a Conceptionist nun, María de Jesús Tomelín, of the Monastery of the Immaculate Conception. He charged their secretaries with writing the lives of these spiritual women.

== Works ==
In his commentary on Wadding's writings, the Jesuit theologian Manuel La Reguera also ascribes to him a Life of Sister María de Jesús. Wadding certainly left notes on her life, but it does not seem that they were ever published.

Wadding's major work, Practica de la teología mistica, the fruit of long personal experience rather than of study, was published nearly 40 years after his death (1681), and went through 10 editions. Outside of Spanish, however, it is chiefly known by the voluminous commentary of Manuel La Reguera, S.J. (2 vols. in fol., Rome, 1740–45).

- Godinez, S. J.: "Práctica de la teologia mystica" (La Puebla de los Angeles, 1681), which exists in a Latin edition together with a commentary by de la Reguera, S. J. (Rome, 1740).
