= Conor O'Brien, 18th Baron Inchiquin =

British-born Irish peer (1943–2023)

The Right Honourable The Lord Inchiquin

Baron Inchiquin
- In office 1982–2023
- Preceded by: Phaedrig O'Brien, 17th Baron Inchiquin
- Succeeded by: Conor O'Brien, 19th Baron Inchiquin

Personal details
- Born: Conor Myles John O'Brien; 17 July 1943 Surrey, England
- Died: 3 June 2023 (aged 79) Dromoland, Ireland
- Spouse(s): Helen O'Farrell, (m. 1988)
- Children: Slaney O’Brien, Lucia O’Brien
- Parent(s): Fionn Myles Maryons O'Brien; Josephine Reine O'Brien
- Education: Eton College; Mons Officer Cadet School

Military service
- Allegiance: United Kingdom
- Branch/service: British Army
- Years of service: 1962–1975
- Rank: Captain

Conor Myles John O'Brien, 18th Baron Inchiquin (17 July 1943 – 3 June 2023), The O’Brien (Chief of the Name), Prince of Thomond, and 10th Baronet of Leamaneh, was an English-born Irish clan chief and holder of an Irish peerage. Although his family's ancestral home, Dromoland Castle, was sold, he remained owner of a large house and substantial estate in Dromoland, County Clare until his death.

== Early life and education ==
O'Brien was the son of Hon Fionn Myles Maryons O'Brien (28 October 1903 – 2 August 1977) and Josephine Reine O'Brien née Bembaron (circa 1913 - 27 October 2011). He had a sister. Fionn was the son of Lucius William O'Brien, 15th Baron of Inchiquin and Ethel Jane Foster.

O'Brien was educated at Eton. He succeeded to the peerage on the death of his uncle, Phaedrig O'Brien, 17th Baron Inchiquin, in 1982.

== Career ==
O'Brien was commissioned into the 14th/20th Kings Hussars of the British Army in 1963. He served as a troop commander in Benghazi, Tripoli, Cyprus on Operation Tosca, Tidworth, Paderborn (as assistant adjutant), Singapore, and Tidworth as adjutant of the regiment. He became Aide-de-Camp to Commander British Forces Gulf in Bahrain and left the army in 1975, retiring with the rank of Captain.

Although the ancestral seat of Dromoland Castle, and some of its demesne, had since left family hands, O'Brien continued to run the lands on the remaining estate. O'Brien operated an exclusive guest house in the new family home, Thomond House, adjacent to the former seat, from 1984 until 2008. He also turned the residual Dromoland Estate into a sporting and leisure venue. In April 2010, he was awarded €7.9m in damages by the High Court over the repudiation of an agreement to buy 377 acres out of the 600 acres of the Dromoland estate which his family still owned.

In 2012, in a long-running dispute with the management of Dromoland Castle, O'Brien was refused an initial application to the High Court for them to immediately return 37 paintings that were loaned several decades prior (after discovering the hotel had allowed damage to occur to many of the paintings, O’Brien requested their prompt return). The hotel, however, scanned and reprinted all the paintings before O’Brien could get them returned and the copies now hang on the walls of Dromoland.

== Other work ==
In 1998, O'Brien visited Antioch, California for St. Patrick's Day and Antioch's first St. Patrick's Day Crinniu, hosted by then-Councilman Allen Payton and the city's council proclaimed "Sir Conor O'Brien Day".

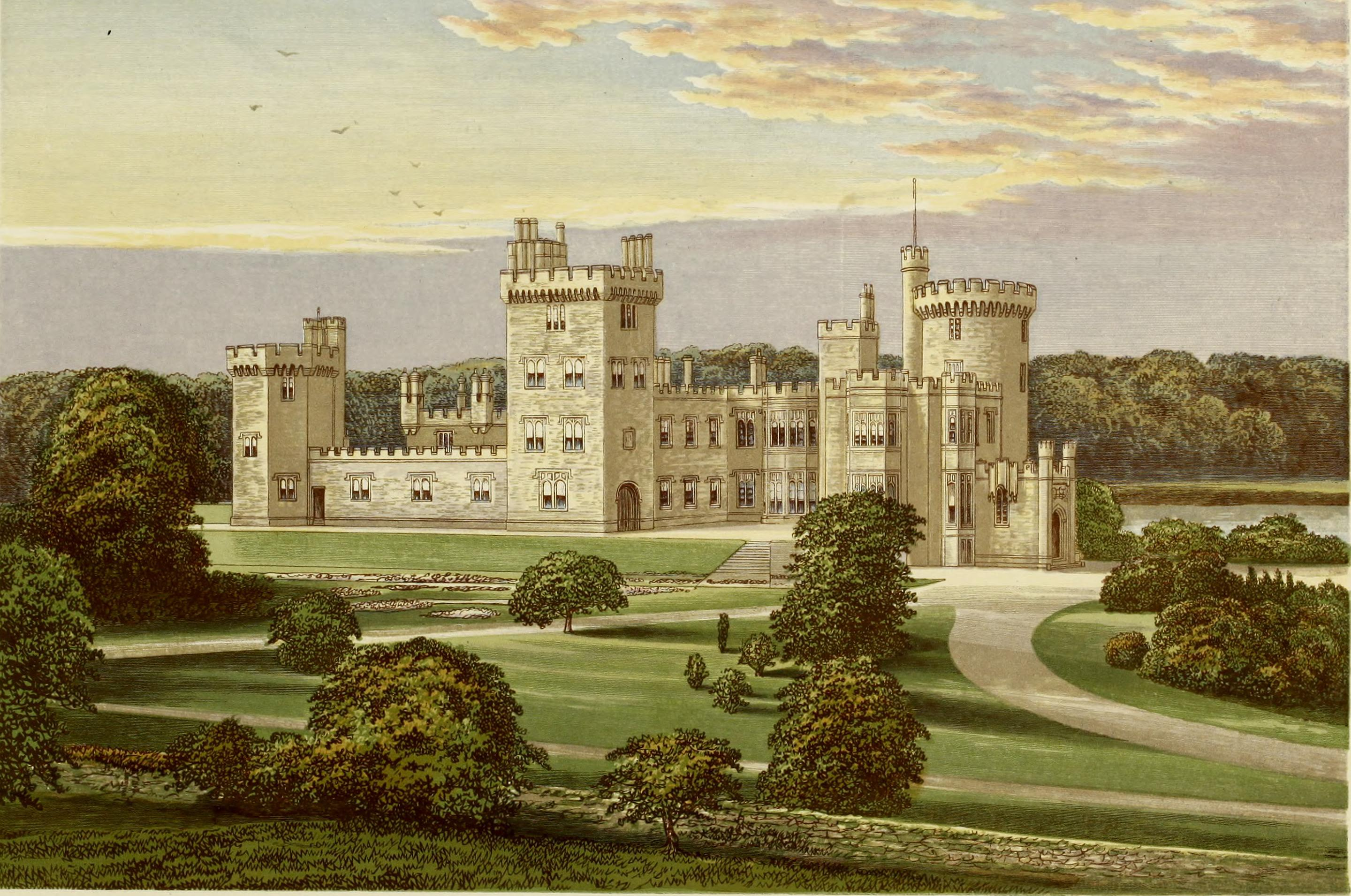
Dromoland Castle, the former ancestral seat

Conor O’Brien formed the O’Brien clan foundation, which claims to connect over 800,000 O’Briens worldwide. He also was at one point the chairman of the Standing Council of Irish Chief and Chieftains.

== Marriage and children ==
O'Brien married Helen O'Farrell in 1988. They had two daughters, Slaney Alexandra Anne O'Brien (1989) and Lucia Josephine O'Brien (1991).

== Death ==
Lord Inchiquin died in Dromoland on 3 June 2023, at the age of 79. He was succeeded in the barony by his first cousin, Conor O'Brien, 19th Baron Inchiquin.

Peerage of Ireland
Preceded by Phaedrig O'Brien	Baron Inchiquin; 1982–2023	Succeeded by Conor O'Brien, 19th Baron Inchiquin
