= Lucius O'Brien, 15th Baron Inchiquin =

English-born Gaelic Irish nobleman

The Right Honourable The Lord Inchiquin JP DL
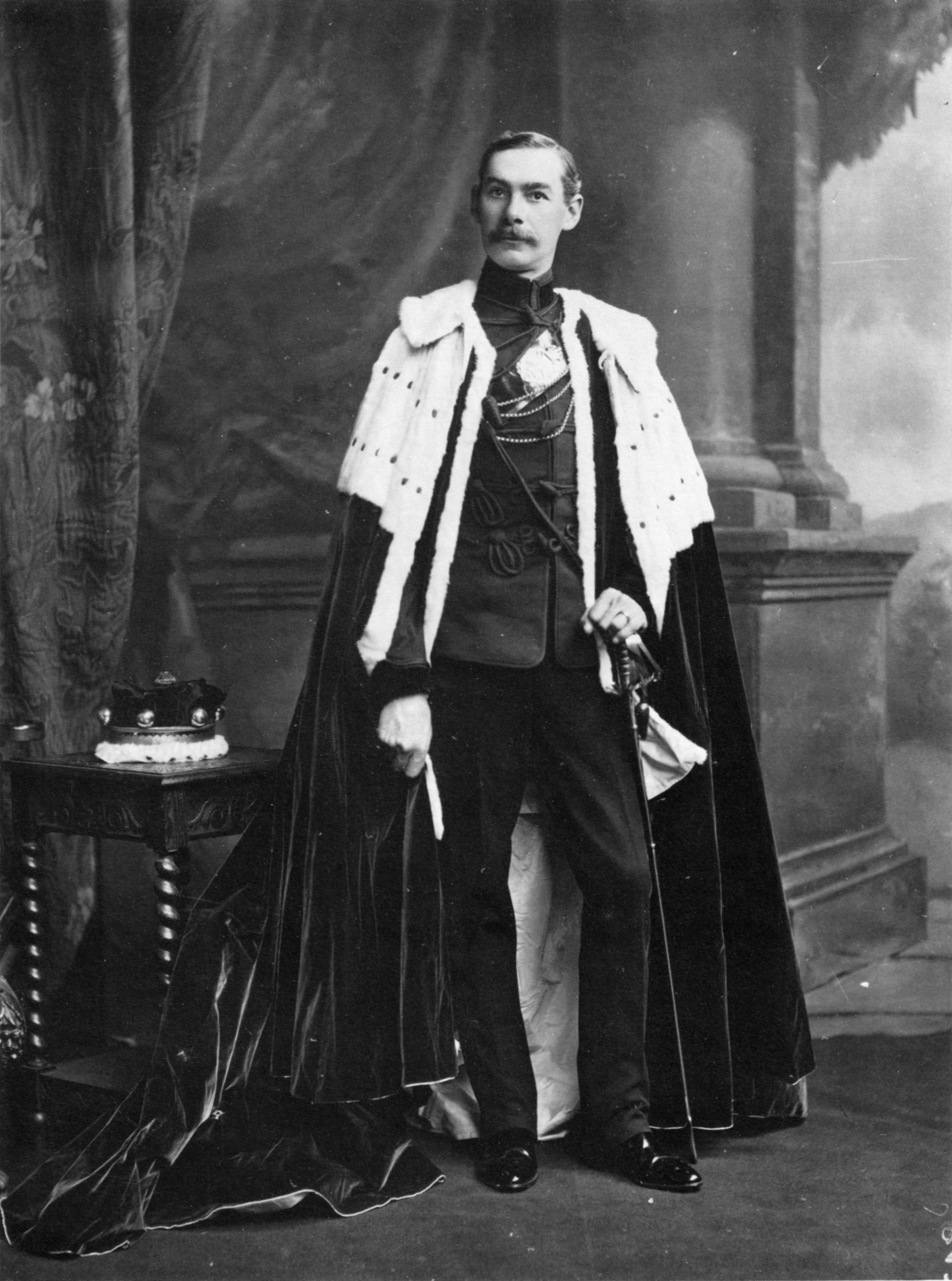
- Sir Lucius O'Brien, the Right Honourable 15th Baron Inchiquin, in his robes as a peer of the Realm

Baron Inchiquin
- In office 9 April 1900 – 9 December 1929
- Preceded by: Edward O'Brien
- Succeeded by: Donough Edward Foster O'Brien

Personal details
- Born: Lucius William O'Brien; 21 June 1864 Bishop's Waltham, United Kingdom
- Died: 9 December 1929 (aged 65) London, United Kingdom
- Spouse: Ethel Jane Foster (m. 1896)
- Children: 6, including Donough Edward Foster O'Brien, 16th Baron Inchiquin and Phaedrig Lucius Ambrose O'Brien, 17th Baron Inchiquin
- Parent: Edward O'Brien, 14th Baron Inchiquin (father)
- Relatives: Conor Myles John O'Brien, 18th Baron Inchiquin (grandson)
- Education: Eton College

Military service
- Allegiance: United Kingdom
- Branch/service: British Army
- Years of service: 1885–1893
- Rank: Lieutenant

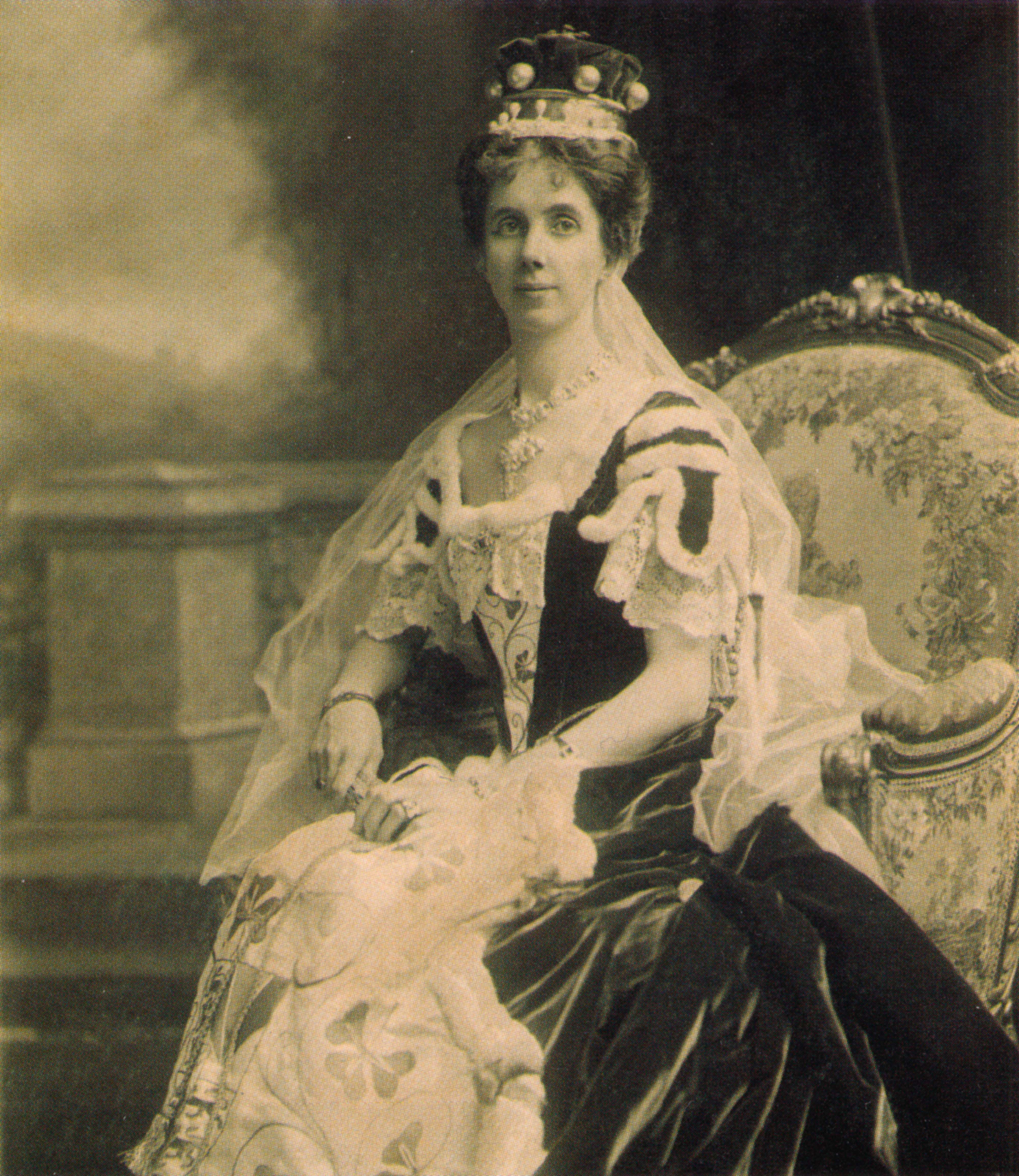
Ethel Jane Foster, wife of 15th Baron Inchiquin

Lucius William O'Brien, 15th Baron Inchiquin (21 June 1864 – 9 December 1929) was the England-born holder of a hereditary peerage in the Peerage of Ireland, as well as Chief of the Name of O'Brien and Prince of Thomond in the Gaelic Irish nobility.

== Early life ==
O'Brien was born in England the second of four children, and oldest son, to Edward O'Brien, 14th Baron Inchiquin and first wife Emily A'Court, at Belmore near Bishop's Waltham, Hampshire. He was educated at Eton College.

== Career ==
O'Brien was commissioned into the Royal Irish Rifles in 1885, transferring in 1886 to the Rifle Brigade (The Prince Consort's Own) in which he served until 1893. On 17 October 1900 he succeeded his father as Honorary Colonel of the Clare Royal Garrison Artillery (Militia), which became the Clare Royal Field Reserve Artillery (Special Reserve) before being disbanded in 1909.

Politically a Conservative, O'Brien unsuccessfully stood for the British House of Commons by contesting the Eastern Division of County Clare in 1885. He was State Steward to the Lord Lieutenant of Ireland in 1895. He succeeded his father's peerage in 1900, serving hence as an Irish Representative Peer in the House of Lords. In 1921 he was appointed to the Senate of Southern Ireland which was abolished the next year by the formation of the Irish Free State.

He was Deputy Lieutenant and Justice of the Peace for County Clare, of which county he was High Sheriff for 1898. He was also a Justice of the Peace for the county of Salop, Shropshire.

== Family ==
On 14 January 1896, Inchiquin married, at Richard's Castle, Ethel Jane Foster, daughter of Johnston Jonas Foster, of Moor Park near Ludlow, Shropshire, which became his English residence. Together they had six children:

- Donough Edward Foster O'Brien, 16th Baron Inchiquin (born 5 January 1897, died 19 October 1968)
- Hon Katharine Beryl O'Brien (born 19 April 1898)
- Phaedrig Lucius Ambrose O'Brien, 17th Baron Inchiquin (born 4 April 1900, died 1982)
- Hon Fionn Myles Maryons O'Brien (born 28 October 1903, died 2 August 1977), father of Conor Myles John O'Brien, 18th Baron Inchiquin
- Hon Griselda Etheldreda Clodagh O'Brien (born 19 October 1906)
- Hon Finola Helga Laetitia Monica O'Brien (born 22 September 1910, died 1975)

Lord Inchiquin died on 9 December 1929, aged sixty-five, and was succeeded by two of his sons as barons.

== Ancestry ==
Ancestors of Lucius O'Brien, 15th Baron Inchiquin

8. Sir Edward O'Brien, 4th Baronet
4. Lucius O'Brien, 13th Baron Inchiquin
9. Charlotte Smith
2. Edward O'Brien, 14th Baron Inchiquin
10. William Fitzgerald
5. Mary Fitzgerald
11. Juliana Cecilia FITZGERALD
1. Lucius O'Brien, 15th Baron Inchiquin
12. William à Court, 1st Baron Heytesbury
6. William Holmes-à Court, 2nd Baron Heytesbury
13. Maria Rebecca Bouverie
3. Emily Holmes-á Court
14. Sir Leonard Thomas Worsley-Holmes, 9th Baronet
7. Elizabeth Holmes
15. Anne Delgarno

Peerage of Ireland
Preceded by Edward O'Brien	Baron Inchiquin; 1900–1929	Succeeded by Donough O'Brien
Political offices
Preceded by The Earl of Portarlington	Representative peer for Ireland; 1900–1929	Office lapsed
