= Baron Inchiquin =

Title in the Peerage of Ireland

Barony of Inchiquin
- Blazon: Arms: Quarterly: 1st and 4th, Gules three Lions passant guardant in pale per pale Or and Argent; 2nd, Argent three Piles meeting in point issuing from the chief Gules; 3rd, Or a Pheon Azure.; Crests: Issuing from a Cloud an Arm embowed brandishing a Sword Argent pommelled and hilted Or.; Supporters: On either side a Lion guardant per fess Or and Argent.
- Creation date: 1 July 1543
- Created by: King Henry VIII
- Peerage: Peerage of Ireland
- First holder: Murrough O'Brien, 1st Earl of Thomond, 1st Baron Inchiquin
- Present holder: Conor O'Brien, 19th Baron Inchiquin
- Heir apparent: Fionn Murrough O'Brien
- Remainder to: the 1st Baron’s heirs male
- Subsidiary titles: Baronet 'of Lemenagh'; The O'Brien, Chief of the Name, Prince of Thomond
- Status: Extant
- Seat: Thomond House
- Former seat: Dromoland Castle

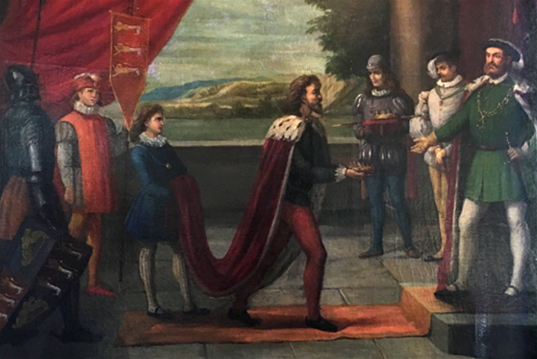
Murrough surrenders his royalty to King Henry VIII at Greenwich upon the Thames July 1543 and receives the titles of Baron Inchiquin for his heirs male and Earl of Thomond with special remainder to his nephew Donough.

Baron Inchiquin (Irish: Barún Inse Uí Chuinn) is one of the older titles in the Peerage of Ireland. It was one of two titles created on 1 July 1543 for Murrough O'Brien, Prince of Thomond, who claimed descent from Brian Boru, a High King of Ireland. The English titles were granted under the policy of surrender and regrant, and therefore conditional upon the abandonment of any Irish titles, the adoption of English customs and laws, pledging of allegiance to the Crown, apostasy from the Catholic Church, and conversion to the Church of Ireland. Murrough was made both Earl of Thomond in the Peerage of Ireland, with remainder to his nephew Donough O'Brien and Baron Inchiquin, with remainder to his male heirs.

Following the death of his first cousin, Conor O'Brien, 18th Baron Inchiquin, in June 2023, the title was assumed by Conor O'Brien, 19th Baron Inchiquin.

== History ==
On his death in 1551, Murrough was succeeded in the earldom, according to the special remainder, by his nephew, the second Earl (see Earl of Thomond for the later history of this title), but the barony of Inchiquin passed to his son Dermod, the second baron. Dermod's great-great-grandson, the sixth baron, was a prominent military commander during the Irish Confederate Wars (1643–48), first for the English Parliament, then as a Royalist commander during the Cromwellian conquest of Ireland (1649–53) during the Wars of the Three Kingdoms. In 1654 he was created Earl of Inchiquin in the Peerage of Ireland.

He was succeeded by his son, William O'Brien, 2nd Earl of Inchiquin, who served as governor of English Tangier and as Governor of Jamaica. His son, William O'Brien, 3rd Earl of Inchiquin, became Governor of Kinsale in 1693. The fourth earl, also named William O'Brien, represented Windsor, Camelford and Aylesbury in the British House of Commons.

The fifth earl, Murrough O'Brien, was the nephew and son-in-law of his predecessor. In 1800, he was created Marquess of Thomond in the Peerage of Ireland, with remainder to his brother, the Honorable Edward Dominic O'Brien, a captain in the British Army. The following year he was made Baron Thomond of Taplow in the County of Buckingham in the Peerage of the United Kingdom to allow him to sit in the House of Lords, with remainder to the male heirs of his body. He died without male issue in 1808, when the barony of Thomond became extinct.

He was succeeded in the marquessate according to the special remainder, and in the other Irish titles, by his nephew William O'Brien, 2nd Marquess of Thomond, the third son of the aforementioned Captain Edward O'Brien. The second marquess was an Irish representative peer. In 1826 he was created Baron Tadcaster of Tadcaster in the County of York in the Peerage of the United Kingdom. He had no sons and on his death in 1846 the barony of Tadcaster became extinct.

He was succeeded in the Irish peerages by his younger brother, James O'Brien, 3rd Marquess of Thomond, an admiral in the Royal Navy. He had no sons and on his death in 1855 the marquessate and earldom of Inchiquin became extinct.

In 1855, he was succeeded in the barony of Inchiquin by his distant relative Sir Lucius O'Brien, 5th Baronet, who became the 13th Baron Inchiquin. The O'Brien Baronetcy, of Leaghmenagh in the County of Clare, had been created in the Baronetage of Ireland in 1686 for Donough O'Brien, who had earlier represented County Clare in the Irish House of Commons. He was the great-great-grandson and namesake of Donough O'Brien (died 1582), younger son of the first Earl of Thomond and first Baron Inchiquin. His grandson, the second baronet, great-grandson the third baronet, and great-great-grandson the fourth baronet, also represented County Clare in the Irish Parliament, with the fourth baronet also representing Ennis. The latter was succeeded by his son, the fifth baronet.

Before becoming the 13th Baron, the fifth Baronet O'Brien had represented County Clare in the House of Commons and was later an Irish Representative Peer. He also served as Lord Lieutenant of County Clare. He was succeeded by his son, Edward O'Brien, 14th Baron Inchiquin, also an Irish Representative Peer and Lord Lieutenant of County Clare. His son, Lucius O'Brien, 15th Baron Inchiquin, also sat in the House of Lords as an Irish Representative Peer, and also served in the British military and had been appointed High Sheriff of Clare in 1898, and justice of the peace of Salop.

According to Desmond Oulton (owner of Clontarf Castle), his father John George Oulton had suggested to Éamon de Valera towards the end of the Irish Free State, that Ireland should have its own king again, as it was in the times of Gaelic Ireland. He suggested to him, a member of the O'Brien Clan, descended in the paternal line from Brian Boru, a previous High King of Ireland: the most senior representative at the time was Donough O'Brien, 16th Baron Inchiquin. Oulton said that Donough's nephew Conor O'Brien, 18th Baron Inchiquin, confirmed that De Valera did offer Donough O'Brien the title of Prince-President of the Irish Republic, but this was turned down and so a President of Ireland was instituted instead. The 16th Baron was succeeded by his younger brother Phaedrig O'Brien, 17th Baron Inchiquin, a consulting geologist, who in turn was succeeded by his nephew, the 18th baron. Following the death of the 18th baron in 2023, the direct male line of the 15th baron failed; the 18th baron was succeeded by his second cousin.

In the Gaelic nobility, Lord Inchiquin is The O'Brien, Chief of the Name, Prince of Thomond.

The family seat of the O'Brien Baronetcy was Dromoland Castle, near Newmarket-on-Fergus, County Clare. The current Baron Inchiquin lives in Thomond House adjacent to Dromoland.

== Barons Inchiquin (1543) ==
- Murrough O'Brien, 1st Earl of Thomond, 1st Baron Inchiquin (died 1551)
- Dermod O'Brien, 2nd Baron Inchiquin (died 1 May 1557)
- Murrough McDermot O'Brien, 3rd Baron Inchiquin (1550–1574)
- Murrough O'Brien, 4th Baron Inchiquin (1563–1597)
- Dermod O'Brien, 5th Baron Inchiquin (1594–1624)
- Murrough O'Brien, 6th Baron Inchiquin (1618–1674) (created Earl of Inchiquin in 1654)

== Earls of Inchiquin (1654) ==
- Murrough O'Brien, 1st Earl of Inchiquin, 6th Baron Inchiquin (1618–1674)
- William O'Brien, 2nd Earl of Inchiquin, 7th Baron Inchiquin (1640–1692)
- William O'Brien, 3rd Earl of Inchiquin, 8th Baron Inchiquin (1662–1719)
- William O'Brien, 4th Earl of Inchiquin, 9th Baron Inchiquin (1700–1777)
- Murrough O'Brien, 5th Earl of Inchiquin, 10th Baron Inchiquin (1726–1808) (created Marquess of Thomond in 1800)

== Marquesses of Thomond (1800) ==
- Murrough O'Brien, 1st Marquess of Thomond, 5th Earl of Inchiquin, 10th Baron Inchiquin (1726–1808)
- William O'Brien, 2nd Marquess of Thomond, 6th Earl of Inchiquin, 11th Baron Inchiquin (1765–1846)
- James O'Brien, 3rd Marquess of Thomond, 7th Earl of Inchiquin, 12th Baron Inchiquin (1768–1855)

== Barons Inchiquin (1543; reverted) ==
- Lucius O'Brien, 13th Baron Inchiquin (1800–1872)
- Edward Donough O'Brien, 14th Baron Inchiquin (1839–1900)
- Lucius William O'Brien, 15th Baron Inchiquin (1864–1929)
- Donough Edward Foster O'Brien, 16th Baron Inchiquin (1897–1968)
- Phaedrig Lucius Ambrose O'Brien, 17th Baron Inchiquin (1900–1982)
- Conor Myles John O'Brien, 18th Baron Inchiquin (1943–2023)
- Conor John Anthony O'Brien, 19th Baron Inchiquin (b. 1952)

The heir apparent is the present peer's son, Hon. Fionn Murrough O'Brien (born 1987).

== O'Brien Baronets, of Leaghmenagh (1686) ==
- Sir Donough O'Brien, 1st Baronet (died 1717)
- Sir Edward O'Brien, 2nd Baronet (died 1765)
- Sir Lucius O'Brien, 3rd Baronet (died 1795)
- Sir Edward O'Brien, 4th Baronet (died 1837)
- Sir Lucius O'Brien, 5th Baronet (1800–1872) (succeeded as 13th Baron Inchiquin in 1855)

See above for further succession.

== Line of succession (simplified) ==
Line of succession, simplified)
- Edward O'Brien, 14th Baron Inchiquin (1839–1900)
  - Hon. Murrough O'Brien (1866–1934)
    - Murrough Richard O'Brien (1910–2000)
      - Conor O'Brien, 19th Baron Inchiquin (born 1952)
        - (1). Hon. Fionn Murrough O'Brien (born 1987)
  - Hon. Henry Barnaby O'Brien (1887–1969)
    - Michael George O'Brien (1928–2008)
      - (2). Peter Thomond O'Brien (born 1961)
        - (3). Angus John Thomond O'Brien (born 1995)
      - (4). John Michael O'Brien (born 1964)

There are further heirs in line descended from the 13th Baron (father of the 14th Baron) and earlier generations.

== The O'Brien line of Conor O'Brien, Chief of the name ==
There is some overlap with the Barons Inchiquin; those people are marked off in bold.

- **Murrough an Taniste O'Brien**, d. 1551
- Donough O'Brien 29 Sep 1582
- Conor O'Brien d. 1603
- Donough O'Brien d. 1634
- Conor O'Brien, 1617–1651
- Donough O'Brien, 1642–1717
- Lucius O'Brien, 1675–1717
- Edward O'Brien, 1705–1765
- Lucius O'Brien, 1731–1795
- Edward O'Brien, 1773–1837
- **Lucius O'Brien**, 1800–1872
- **Edward O'Brien**, 1839–1900
- **Lucius O'Brien**, 1864–1929
- Fionn O'Brien, 1903–1977
- Conor Myles John O'Brien, 18th Baron Inchiquin (1943–2023)
- Conor John Anthony O'Brien, 19th Baron Inchiquin (b. 1952)

== Art and culture ==
Lord Inchiquin is the name of a traditional Irish air by O'Carolan, assumed to be dedicated to his contemporary William O'Brien, 4th Earl of Inchiquin.

The painter George O'Brien, who made his name as an artist in New Zealand, was a descendant of the first Baron Inchiquin.

== See also ==
- O'Brien dynasty
- Kings of Cashel
- Kings of Desmond
- Kings of Munster
- Kings of Thomond 1119–1543
- Irish nobility
- Irish royal families
- Earl of Inchiquin (1764 ship)
