= Edward O'Brien, 14th Baron Inchiquin =

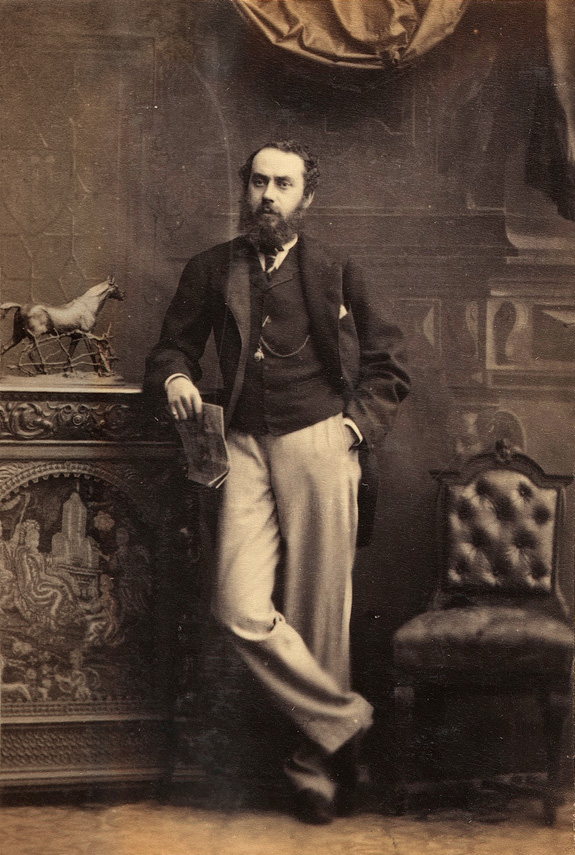
Edward Donough O'Brien, 14th Baron Inchiquin, 1865

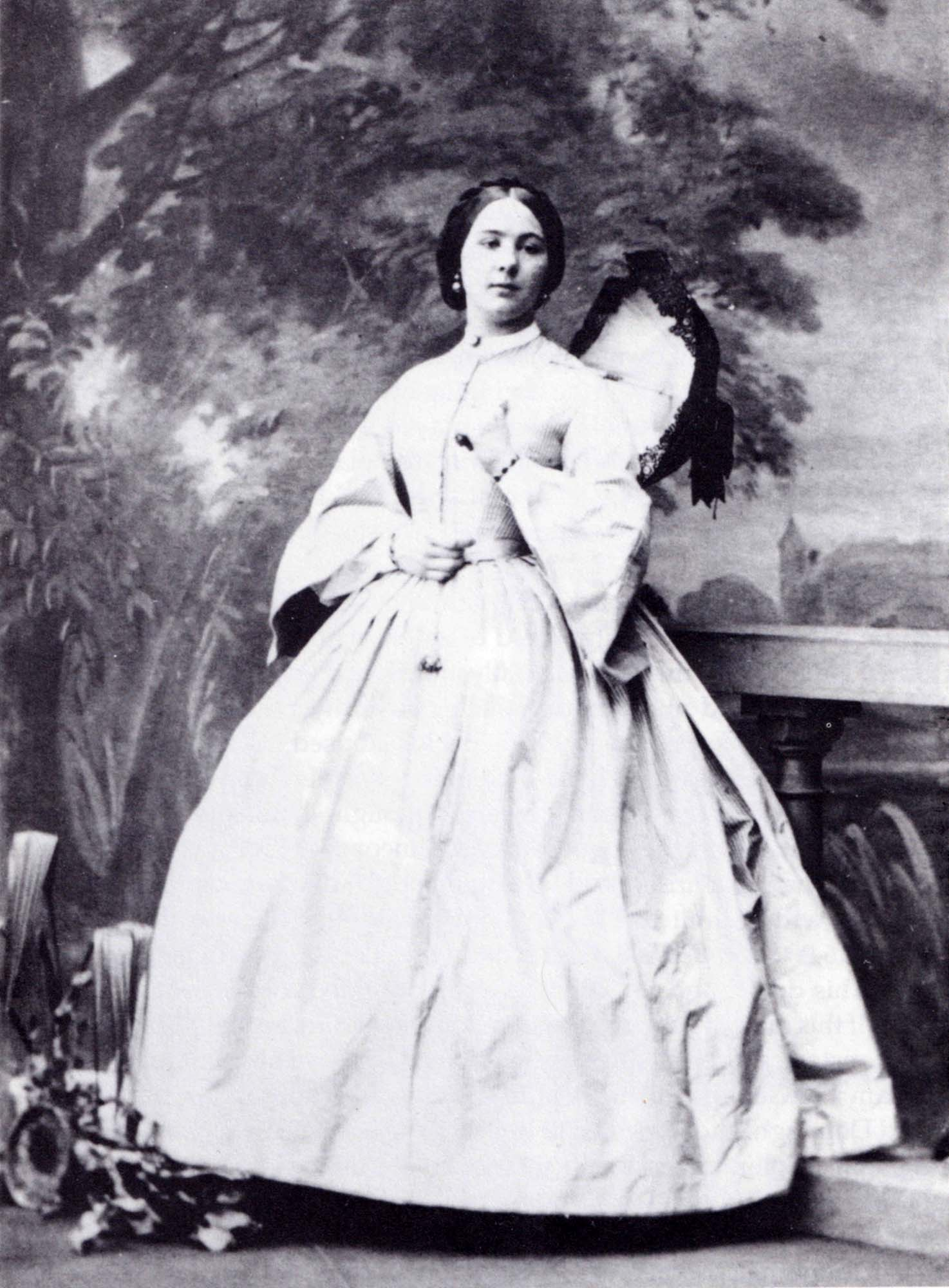
Emily Holmes-á Court, first wife of Edward O'Brien, 14th Baron Inchiquin.

Edward Donough O'Brien, 14th Baron Inchiquin KP (14 May 1839 – 9 April 1900) was the holder of a hereditary peerage in the Peerage of Ireland, as well as Chief of the Name of O'Brien and Prince of Thomond in the Gaelic Irish nobility. He was High Sheriff of Clare in 1862 and Lord Lieutenant of Clare from 1879 to 1900.

== Family and background ==
O'Brien was born the eldest son of Lucius O'Brien, 13th Baron Inchiquin and Mary Fitzgerald. He graduated MA in 1860 from Trinity College, Cambridge where his uncle, the Rev. Arthur Martineau (1806–1872) had been a Fellow.

He was appointed High Sheriff of Clare in 1862, and served as Lord Lieutenant of Clare from 1879 until his death in 1900. He was a Representative peer for Ireland from 1873 to 1900.

He took the title in March 1872, upon the death of his father, and was appointed a Knight of the Order of St. Patrick on 5 August 1892. On 26 April 1882 he was appointed Honorary Colonel of the 7th Brigade, South Irish Division, Royal Artillery (the Clare Militia), which he held until his death.

He died at his residence Dromoland Castle, County Clare, on 9 April 1900. The Dublin correspondent of The Times sent the following notice published the day after his death:

″Lord Inchiquin was extremely popular among all classes of his native county, and was a large emplyer of labour on his estate at Dromoland. Until quite recently, he took an active part in local affairs, and was for many years chairman of the Ennis Board of Guardians. He was disqualified by his rank from serving on the grand jury, but his advice and opinions were always at the service of and always gratefully received by that body. By his own express wish the funeral will be conducted as privately and simply as possible.″

O'Brien married firstly in 1862 Hon. Emily Holmes-á Court (died 1868), the daughter of William Holmes-á Court, 2nd Baron Heytesbury, and together they had four children:

- Geraldine Mary O'Brien, MBE, (1863–?) married twice
- Lucius William O'Brien, 15th Baron Inchiquin (1864–1929)
- Lt.-Col. Murrough O'Brien, DSO, (1866–1934), Northumberland Fusiliers
- Lt Edward Donough O'Brien (1867–1943), 7th Brigade, South Irish Division, RA

He then married in 1874 Hon. Ellen Harriet White, the daughter of Luke White, 2nd Baron Annaly, with whom he had a further ten children:

- Clare O'Brien (1875–1950), married in 1904 Brig-Gen Noel Armar Lowry-Corry, DSO, great-grandson of Somerset Lowry-Corry, 2nd Earl Belmore and son of Mr and Mrs Armar Henry Lowry Corry (1836–1893) of Forest Lodge, Windsor Forest where Noel and his wife were living in 1914.
- Moira O'Brien (1876–?) married twice
- Eileen O'Brien (1877–?)
- Maud O'Brien (1878–?)
- Donough O'Brien (1879–?) Barrister-at-Law
- Beatrice O'Brien (1882–?), married Marquess Guglielmo Marconi, the radio pioneer and Nobel Prize winner.
- Lilah O'Brien (1884–?) married twice
- Capt Henry Barnaby O'Brien, MC (1887–?)
- Doreen O'Brien (1888–?)
- Lt Desmond O'Brien, Royal Flying Corps (born 1895, killed in action 1915)

Honorary titles
Preceded by Charles William White	Lord Lieutenant of Clare; 1879–1900	Succeeded by Hector Stewart Vandeleur
Political offices
Preceded by The Lord Kilmaine	Representative peer for Ireland; 1873–1900	Succeeded by The Viscount Frankfort de Montmorency
Peerage of Ireland
Preceded by Lucius O'Brien	Baron Inchiquin; 1872–1900	Succeeded by Lucius O'Brien
