= Murrough O'Brien, 4th Baron Inchiquin =

Murrough MacMurrough O'Brien, 4th Baron of Inchiquin (1562 – 24 July 1597) was the son of Murrough McDermot O'Brien, 3rd Baron Inchiquin and Margaret Cusack, daughter of Sir Thomas Cusack of Cussington, Meath, Lord Chancellor of Ireland and his second wife Maud Darcy.

He married Mabel Nugent, daughter of Christopher Nugent, 6th Baron Delvin. He had one son; Dermod O'Brien, 5th Baron Inchiquin.

He was shot in 1597 when fording the River Erne near Sligo during the Nine Years War. When half across the ford, a bullet passed under one arm and out at the other. He fell from his horse and drowned.

He was buried at Donegal Abbey and was succeeded by his son, then only 2 years old.

Peerage of Ireland
| Preceded by Murrough McDermot O'Brien | Baron Inchiquin; 1573–1597 | Succeeded by Dermod O'Brien |
