= Cliffe Hill =

Hill in East Sussex, England

Coordinates: 50.87801°N 0.03694°E

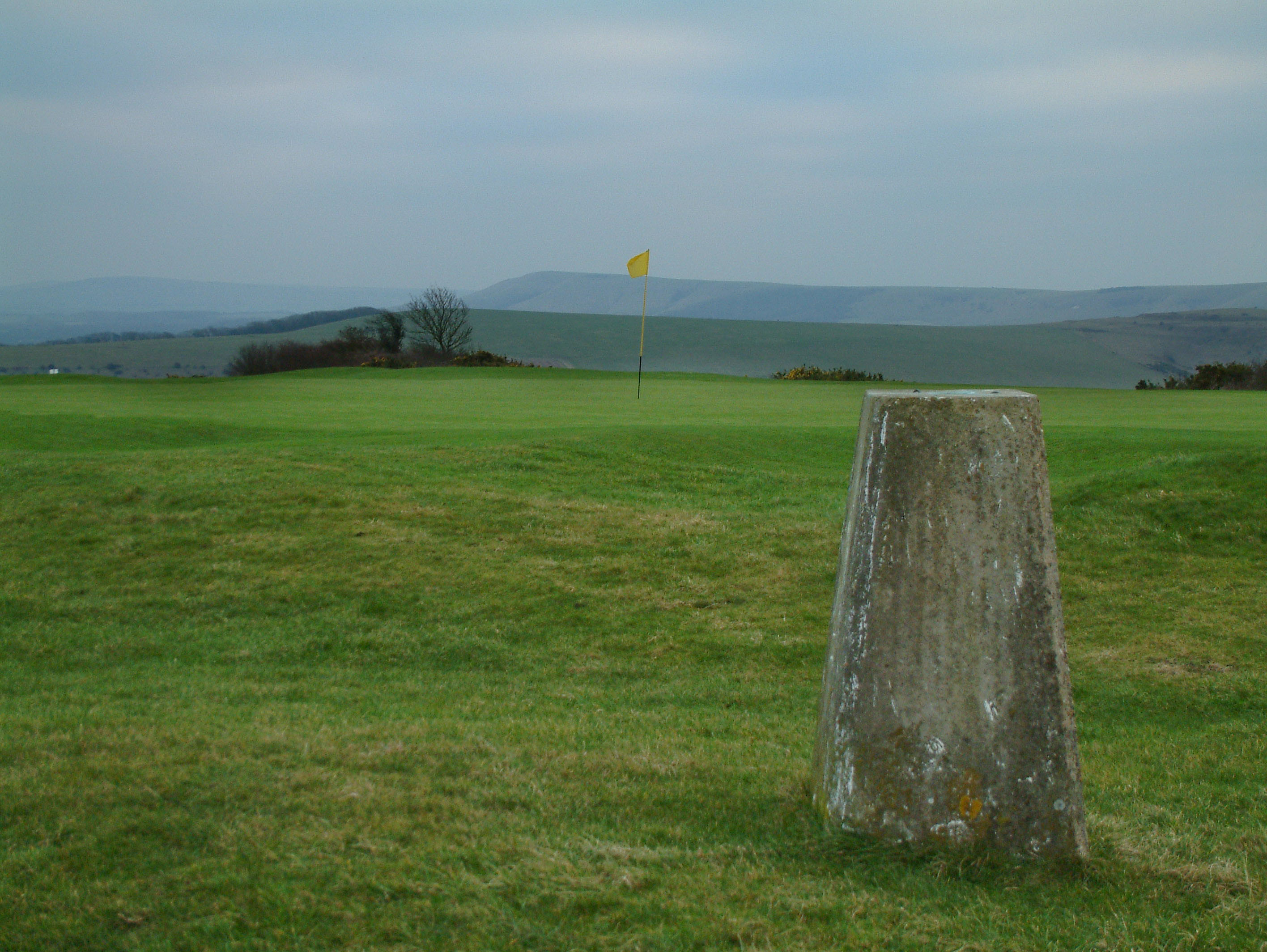
- The summit of Cliffe Hill

Highest point
- Elevation: 164 m (538 ft)
- Prominence: 152 m (499 ft)
- Parent peak: Crowborough
- Listing: Marilyn

Geography
- Location: South Downs, England
- OS grid: TQ434107
- Topo map: OS Landranger 198

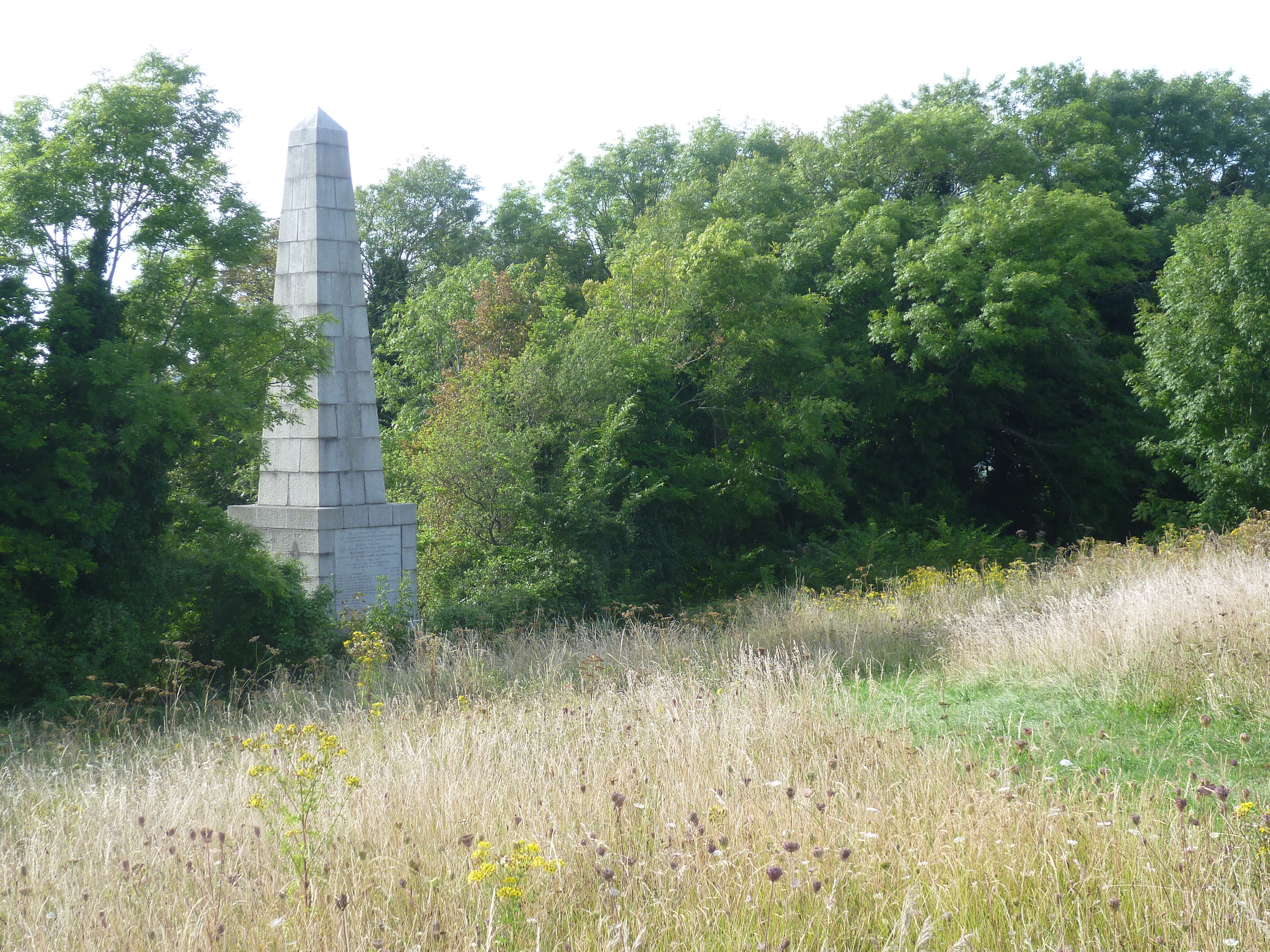
The Martyrs' Memorial

Cliffe Hill is a hill to the east of the town of Lewes in East Sussex, England. It is impressive on its western edge, where it looms over Lewes. Its summit is covered in a golf course. It is the second lowest Marilyn in England.

Also to be found on the hill is an obelisk known as Martyrs' Memorial commemorating the destruction of Lewes' monastery by Henry VIII and the burning of the 17 Protestant martyrs known as the Lewes Martyrs in 1555–1557. The obelisk is located close the site where a bonfire was located in 1606 on the first anniversary of the discovery of the Gunpowder Plot.

A Bronze Age barrow was located on the hill, and excavated in 1930 before being destroyed by quarrying. The barrow contained several cremations topped by a cairn of flints, and was roughly 15 metres in diameter. Another long barrow is used as a hazard on one of the golf course holes.

Although the summit is on the Lewes golf course, a public footpath runs along the southern flank of the hill, from which the golf course can readily be reached by any one of several stiles which are located on the course's southern boundary.
