= Murrough McDermot O'Brien, 3rd Baron Inchiquin =

Irish noble (died 1573)

Murrough McDermot O'Brien (c.1550 - 20 April 1573) was the 3rd Baron Inchiquin. He was the son of Dermod O'Brien, 2nd Baron Inchiquin and Margaret O'Brien and inherited his title in 1557 on the death of his father.

He married Margaret Cusack, daughter of Sir Thomas Cusack of Cussington, Meath, Lord Chancellor of Ireland and his second wife Maud Darcy.

He was murdered in 1573 by Dermot O'Shaughnessey, supposedly at the instigation of Ulick Burke, 3rd Earl of Clanricarde.

He was succeeded by his son, Murrough O'Brien, 4th Baron Inchiquin.

Peerage of Ireland
Preceded by Dermod McMurrough O'Brien	Baron Inchiquin; 1557–1573	Succeeded by Murrough McMurrough O'Brien
