= Rich Ingram, 5th Viscount of Irvine =

English peer and politician (1688–1721)

The Right Honourable The Viscount of Irvine

Governor of Kingston-upon-Hull
- In office 1715–1721
- Preceded by: Richard Sutton
- Succeeded by: Thomas Stanwix

Personal details
- Born: 6 January 1688
- Died: 10 April 1721 (aged 33)
- Cause of death: Smallpox
- Spouse: Lady Anne Howard (m. 1717)
- Relations: John Machell (grandfather)
- Parent(s): Arthur Ingram, 3rd Viscount of Irvine; Isabella Machell
- Education: Eton College; Christ's College, Cambridge; University of Leyden

Colonel Rich Ingram, 5th Viscount of Irvine (6 January 1688 – 10 April 1721), was an English peer and politician.

== Early life ==
Ingram was born on 6 January 1688. He was the second of nine sons born to Isabella Machell (1670–1764) and Arthur Ingram, 3rd Viscount of Irvine, the Vice-Admiral of Yorkshire and Member of Parliament for Yorkshire and Scarborough. His brothers were Edward (who died of smallpox after his Grand Tour), Arthur (MP for Horsham), Henry (also MP for Horsham), John, George (the Chaplain to the House of Commons), Charles (an Army Officer and also MP for Horsham), Thomas, and William Ingram. Of the nine brothers, three died in infancy, five acceded to the Viscountcy, and only one, Charles (father of the 9th and final Viscount of Irvine), had children.

His paternal grandparents were Henry Ingram, 1st Viscount of Irvine and the former Lady Essex Montagu (a daughter of Edward Montagu, 2nd Earl of Manchester). His maternal grandparents were the former Helena Warmestry and John Machell, MP for Horsham, of Hills, Sussex. His grandmother Helena was a daughter of Gervase Warmestry, and step-daughter of Sir John Covert, 1st Baronet,

He schooled at Eton College and was admitted Fellow-Commoner at Christ's College, Cambridge, aged 14 in 1703, where his elder brother the 4th Viscount had studied with the Master, John Covel. He was admitted a student at the University of Leyden in September 1704.

== Career ==
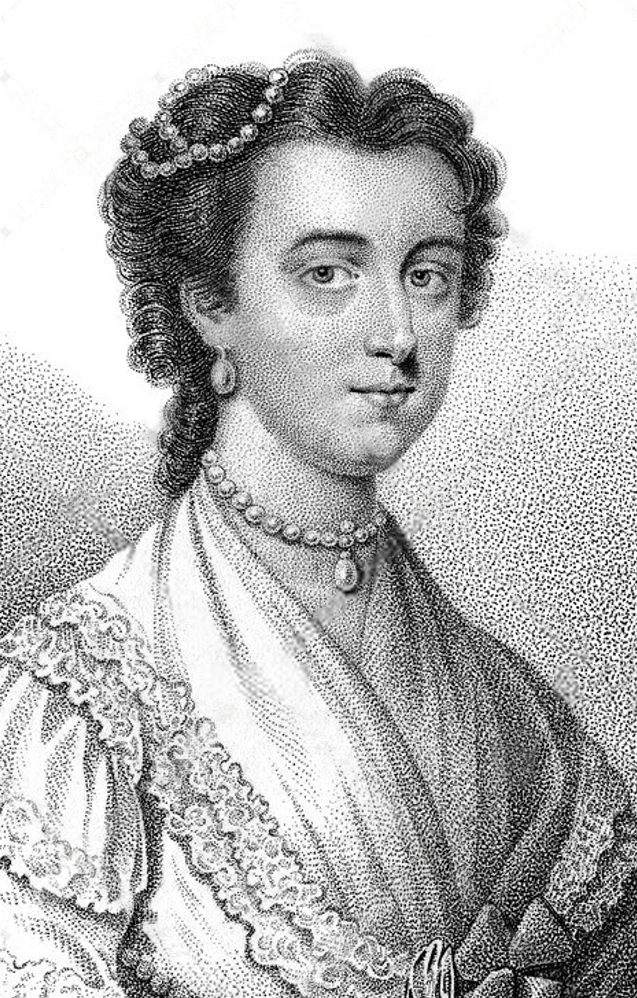
Lord Irvine's wife, Anne Ingram, Viscountess Irvine.

Under the terms of his grandfather Machell's will, Rich inherited the property of Hills, with 190 acres, at Horsham, together with a burgage at Horsham, several properties in London and in other parts of England, at his age of 21 years: the will having been proved in 1704 by the executors, Rich was sworn to probate, aged 22, as Rich Ingram alias Machell on 10 March 1711/12.

After his elder brother Edward died from smallpox, he succeeded in the viscountcy in 1714. This was a Scottish peerage and did not entitle him to a seat in the House of Lords. He was appointed Lord-Lieutenant of the East Riding of Yorkshire the same year, a post he held until 1721. He was also Governor of Kingston-upon-Hull between 1715 and 1721 and a colonel of the 16th Regiment of Foot between 1715 and 1717 and of the 1st Regiment of Dragoon Guards between 1717 and 1721. In 1720 he was appointed Governor of Barbados but died of smallpox before taking up the post.

== Personal life ==
In 1717, Lord Irvine married Lady Anne Howard (c. 1696–1764), daughter of Charles Howard, 3rd Earl of Carlisle and Lady Anne Capel, daughter of the Earl of Essex and Lady Elizabeth Percy. Their portrait was painted by Jonathan Richardson (the elder, 1667–1745). There were no children from the marriage.

He died from smallpox in April 1721, aged 33. He is buried in Westminster Abbey. Lord Irvine was succeeded by his younger brother, Arthur, to whom the Horsham estate also passed by entail in default of male issue from Rich. The Viscountess of Irvine was a Lady of the Bedchamber to the Princess of Wales (mother of George III) in 1736 and married, as her second husband, Brig-Gen. William Douglas (MP for Kinross-shire) in 1737. She died in December 1764.

Military offices
Preceded by Hans Hamilton	Colonel of Viscount Irvine's Regiment of Foot; 1715–1717	Succeeded by John Cholmley
Preceded by Richard Sutton	Governor of Kingston-upon-Hull; 1715–1721	Succeeded by Thomas Stanwix
Preceded by Hon. Henry Lumley	Colonel of The King's Own Regiment of Horse; 1717–1721	Succeeded by The Viscount Cobham
Honorary titles
Preceded by The Duke of Leeds	Lord-Lieutenant of the East Riding of Yorkshire; 1714–1721	Succeeded by William Pulteney
Preceded by The Duke of Leeds	Custos Rotulorum of the East Riding of Yorkshire; 1715	Succeeded by The Earl of Burlington
Peerage of Scotland
Preceded by Edward Machel Ingram	Viscount of Irvine; 1714–1721	Succeeded by Arthur Ingram
