= John Machell =

John Machell (1637–1704) was for twenty years Member of Parliament for Horsham, Sussex, during the reigns of Charles II, James II and William III and Mary II. By the marriage of his daughter Isabella Machell (1670–1764) to Arthur Ingram, 3rd Viscount of Irvine, he became the grandfather of the fourth, fifth, sixth, seventh and eighth Viscounts of Irvine, and great-grandfather of the ninth, seated at Temple Newsam near Leeds, whose family inherited and augmented his valuable property of Hills house at Horsham, and continued the parliamentary tradition there.

== Family origins ==
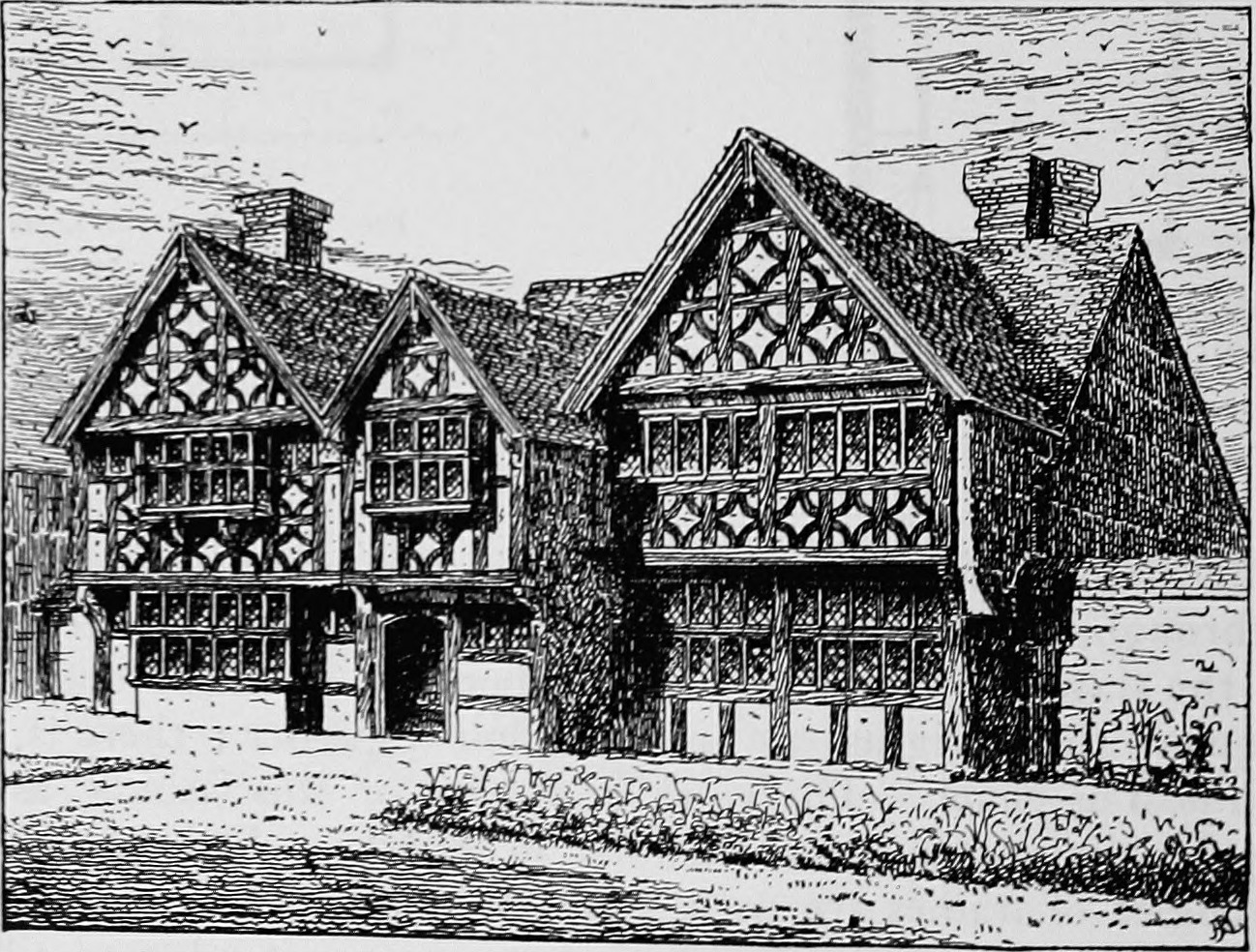
Great Tangley, near Wonersh

John Machell's father, Mathew Machell (c. 1605–1682), was a great-grandson of John Machell, Sheriff of London in 1555–56. Mathew's father John (1580–1647) married Jane, daughter of Sir Nicholas Woodroffe of Poyle, Surrey, in 1599, and, developing his London and East India Company commercial interests, and having established himself in Wendover, Buckinghamshire, remarried in 1624 to Lady Elizabeth Aungier of Great Tangley, near Wonersh, Surrey, daughter of Francis Aungier and his first wife Douglas Fitzgerald (sister to Gerald FitzGerald, 14th Earl of Kildare). Machell took up residence in Surrey. Lady Elizabeth had acquired Tangley by her first marriage, to Simon Carryll, by whom she had issue including a daughter Elizabeth. Carryll dying in c. 1619, she remarried to Richard Barne (1573–1620) (son of George Barne and Anne, daughter of Sir William Garrard), by whom she had a son and daughter before becoming Machell's wife. Her father, who was created first Baron of Longford in 1621, married Barne's sister Anne as his second wife.

Although John Machell and Lady Elizabeth had no direct issue between them, the union of their lines occurred in the next generation, when in 1635 Mathew Machell, the third son of John, married his own step-sister Elizabeth Carryll at Wonersh. Mathew had been apprenticed a Goldsmith in London to the royal silversmith Edward Sewster, who died in 1628 granting the uncompleted term of service to his apprentice. Mathew and Elizabeth had three children, christened by Stephen Geree at Wonersh, of whom John Machell, born 1637, was the only one to survive infancy. His mother, who appears to have been a woman of serious religious character, died aged 23 of smallpox at or near Tangley at Easter 1639. John therefore became the only heir in blood of the Machell connection with the Carryll and Aungier families.

== Early life and education ==
John was probably nurtured at Great Tangley by his grandmother: his father remarried in 1644 to a widow Jane Smither, sister and co-heir of John Downe of Cobham, Surrey (d. 1661), from whom the estate of Downe Place, Downside, descended to Jane's son George Smither. There were two sons and two daughters of Mathew's second family who, during the 1650s and 1660s, had their country seat at West Horsley (near the Aungier and Fitzgerald residences). Mathew's sister Jane had married into the Gavell family who, like the Downes and Suttons, were heirs to lands around Cobham formerly belonging to Chertsey Abbey through pre-Reformation familial connections. John Machell the grandfather died in 1647, his eldest son John (of Wendover) being his heir, but making some provision for his grandsons: in 1634 he had taken control of the estate of Nicholas, his second son, who died young leaving an infant boy. Lady Elizabeth died in 1650, and Great Tangley passed to her son John Carryll.

John Machell, Mathew's son, was educated at the Inner Temple, which he entered in 1649, and was called in 1658. His contemporary there, his cousin Nicholas Machell the younger, died of smallpox at the Paper Buildings in January 1654/55. In 1654 Mathew Machell purchased for his son the mansion (now lost) and 180 acre estate of Hills, at Horsham, from Thomas Middleton, M.P., which in 1658–59, being in the occupation of Bray Chowne, was conveyed to John for £3000, though the sale was not finalized until 1668, when the Middleton heir reached majority. Hills had been an hereditament of Sir John Caryll's of Warnham, Sussex (Simon Carryll's great-uncle): John's great-great-grandfather Edward Lewknor (grandfather of John Machell of Great Tangley) had held a parliamentary seat for Horsham in 1553, reflecting his ancestral connections of Lewknor and Radmyld (Hawksbourne manor) and of Hoo and Copley (Roffey manor) in Horsham.

Having made this settlement upon John, his father Mathew made a will in 1661 leaving many valuable properties in the City of London to the children of his second marriage. Licence was obtained for John Machell's marriage to Prudence Butler of Amberley Castle on 30 March 1661, but it did not take place. In 1663 he reputedly sought the hand of the sister of Samuel Gott of Battle, but Gott himself would not consent. Machell and his kinsman Tully met Gott at an ale-house, and while Tully kept lookout Machell gave Gott a thorough beating. Being indicted and found guilty, Machell was fined £1000 and Tully £500, they were imprisoned for a month, and bound in securities for good behaviour for seven years. The King demanded that the penalties be levied in full rigour by way of example.

== The family path to parliament ==
In December 1666 Machell married Helena, daughter of Gervase Warmestry, registrar of the Worcester diocese, and step-daughter of Sir John Covert, who was elected an M.P. for Horsham in 1661 and again in 1669. Helena's sister Cecily was the wife of Edward Eversfield, M.P. for Bramber, Sussex in 1661. Early in 1667 Machell sat as a Justice of the Peace, and became a Commissioner for Subsidies, in which role he continued until 1680. He resumed work as a Justice in 1668. In that year his uncle John Machell of Wendover died leaving an established family. John and Helena had four children, of whom two daughters, Isabella (b. 1670) and Caecilia Maria, survived infancy. In both parliaments of 1679 Anthony Eversfield, brother of Edward, represented Horsham together with John Michell, and in 1681 John Machell, who had acquired burgages in Horsham, successfully stood in the place of Eversfield and represented Horsham in parliament with Michell. His cousin John Machell was meanwhile active in the elections at Wendover, where the Hampden family maintained a strong presence.

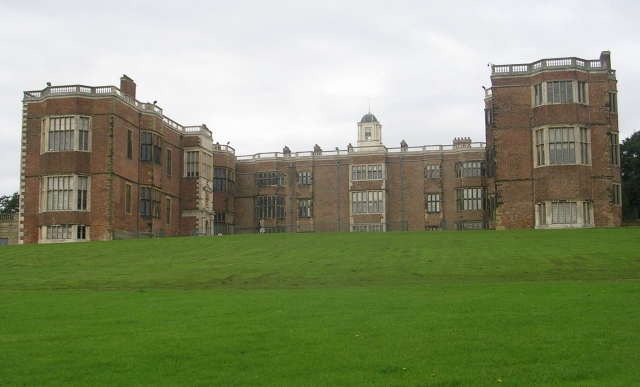
Temple Newsam House, seat of the Viscounts of Irvine.

During this first term Machell's family affairs came to the fore. His father Mathew died, having modified his will to take account of properties burnt in the Great Fire, now prime building land in the city. His widow Jane and her son George Smither were his executors. Mathew had indulgently overlooked repayments which John owed to him on behalf of his stepmother: in 1683 and 1684 she was obliged to sue John for them, and for properties in Blackfriars and Cheapside, seemingly without success. John's half-brothers Joseph (citizen and Grocer of London) and Mathew Machell now had families of their own, and their sister Anne became engaged to William Newman in 1679, soon after his carvings for St Stephen Walbrook were completed and introduced.

John advanced his elder daughter Isabella, and as of St Benet Gracechurch, in October 1685 (when she was 15), married her to Arthur Ingram of Temple Newsam, 3rd Viscount of Irvine (aged 19), a grandson of Edward Montagu, 2nd Earl of Manchester. (This reinforced older Machell connections with the Rich family.) Her nine sons, heirs to the viscountcy, were born between 1686 and 1701. In 1691 Machell's second daughter Caecilia Maria married John Parsons at All Hallows-on-the-Wall, and they had a daughter Helena. Sir Arthur Ingram (died 1642), Arthur's great-grandfather, had a long parliamentary career and had received considerable royal favour under James I.

In the 1685 election Machell and Anthony Eversfield were returned for Horsham, though as a Whig he took little part in the parliament of James II. They were returned together again for the Convention Parliament of 1689. John Machell held his seat in three further parliaments spanning the 1690s, through the election of 1690 (with Thomas White) and those of 1695 and 1698 (with Henry Yates). He was probably an Exclusionist, and was identified as a Court supporter. Among his parliamentary contributions he advocated the rights of Quakers to make solemn affirmations instead of taking the Oath, attacked the severity of James II's judiciary, and spoke against other oppressive measures. Having been commissioner for wine licences in 1690–91, he soon afterwards advocated a general tax on the imports of French red wines. He voted for the attainder of Sir John Fenwick in 1696.

== Last years and legacy ==
Machell was increasingly inactive or absent from parliament during the later 1690s, sometimes on the grounds of health, and did not contest the 1701 elections. His half-brother Joseph having died, in 1689 the widow made a will entrusting her two children Thomas and Anne Machell and their legacies to John Machell's wardship, a role towards the orphans which he accepted as executor in proving their mother's will in 1693. John's stepmother Jane and half-brother Mathew Machell made their residence in London, and in his will written in 1702 John Machell left an annuity of £10 per annum to Mathew Machell of London, Gent., his "brother of the half blood". Arthur Ingram having died in that year, Edward (1686–1714) became 4th Viscount while still at Eton, and soon afterwards was making a good impression at Christ's College, Cambridge, where John Covel had him under instruction and sent his good wishes to Lady Isabella and Mr Machell at Temple Newsam. John Machell died at Temple Newsam, but was buried at Horsham in 1704.

After other bequests (including provision for his orphaned granddaughter Helena Parsons), the bulk of his fortune was entailed upon his Ingram grandchildren, commencing with Rich and his heirs male in succession, and then in default to each of the other grandchildren and their heirs in turn, upon condition that they should henceforth use the surname Machell and not that of Ingram. An acknowledgement of this wish was made by the eldest grandson Edward Machell Ingram (who, as master of Temple Newsam, never inherited Hills), but not by Rich or his successors, more than one of whom served as MPs for Horsham. Their mother Isabella the Dowager Viscountess Irvine outlived all her sons and lived to be 94. By the time of her death in 1764 her grandson Charles Ingram the 9th and last Viscount, son of the seventh son Charles Ingram, had inherited the title and was the last male heir.

Parliament of Great Britain
| Preceded by Anthony Eversfield; John Michell | Member of Parliament for Horsham; 1681–1701; With: John Michell 1681–1685; Anthony Eversfield 1685–1689 and 1689–1690; Thomas White (1667–1719) 1690–1695; Henry Yates (MP) 1695–1698 and 1698–1701 | Succeeded by Henry Yates (MP); Henry Cowper (1668–1707) |
