= George Ingram, 8th Viscount of Irvine =

English clergyman and peer

George Ingram, 8th Viscount Irvine (or Irwin) (1694 – 1763) was an English clergyman and peer in the Peerage of Scotland. His occupation of the Viscountcy was brief, from 1761 to 1763. He was Chaplain to the Speaker of the House of Commons.

== Origins, education and preferments ==
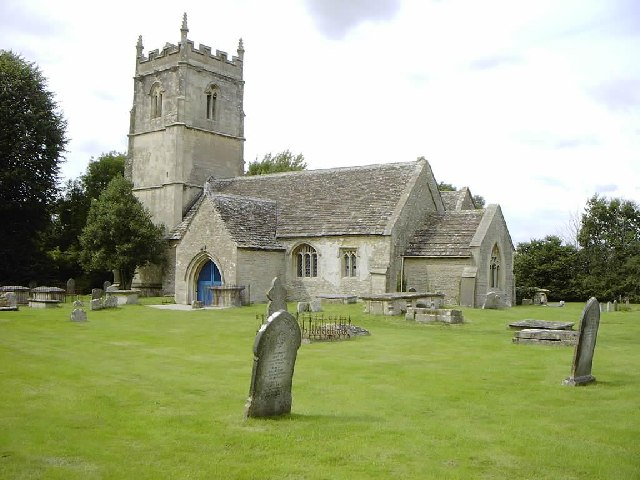
Hankerton Holy Cross

The 8th Viscount Irvine was the sixth son of Arthur Ingram, 3rd Viscount of Irvine (died 1702), of Temple Newsam, Yorkshire, and his wife Isabella Machell, daughter of John Machell, Member of Parliament for Horsham, of Hills (Horsham), Sussex, and Helen Warmestry. Baptized at Whitkirk, Yorkshire, he matriculated from Oriel College, Oxford on 7 June 1711, at the age of 17, and graduated BA in 1714. He obtained a Fellowship in the same college in 1716, took MA in 1717, and was ordained deacon at Christ Church Cathedral, Oxford by Bishop John Potter on 21 December 1718. At Westminster St James he was ordained priest on 8 February following, by Bishop Talbot of Salisbury, and three days later was instituted Rector of Crudwell, Wiltshire, a living which he held until his death. In October 1723 he was also instituted to the perpetual vicarage of Hankerton, Wiltshire. (Both Crudwell and Hankerton are parishes near Malmesbury.) He was appointed chaplain of the House of Commons in 1724, and was installed canon of Windsor and Prebendary of Westminster.

== Matters affecting succession of title ==
During all this period his elder brothers Edward (died 1714), Rich (died 1721) and Arthur (died 1736) were successively 4th, 5th and 6th Viscounts Irwin. On the death of Arthur, the fourth son, Henry, became seventh Viscount, and lived until 1761, making his tenure of the title the longest of any of the family. The fifth son, John Ingram, was either dead or presumed to be dead in January 1724/5, when probate of a will in John's name dated 20 February 1714/5 was granted to his mother Viscountess Isabella. (This presents John as of Horsham, but belonging to a military regiment stationed in Ireland, and left a £5 annuity to one Mrs Bowyer of Portarlington, County Laois, and £100 to be shared between all her grandchildren after her decease. The substance of his estate and goods was left to his two executors, his mother and his brother Rich, in equal shares.) The burial of a John Engrham, Esq is in the register of the church of St Mary, Horsham on 26 February 1714/15 and is assumed to be him. The Revd. George Ingram therefore inherited the title as the next male heir, as the 8th Viscount, and held it for two years until his death. As George's younger brothers Charles (died 1748), Thomas (died 1698 in infancy) and William (died 1756) had all predeceased him, the title passed lastly to his nephew Charles Ingram (1727-1778) (son of the seventh son Charles), the only remaining male heir of the 1st Viscount, with whose death in 1778 the title became extinct.

== Bequests ==
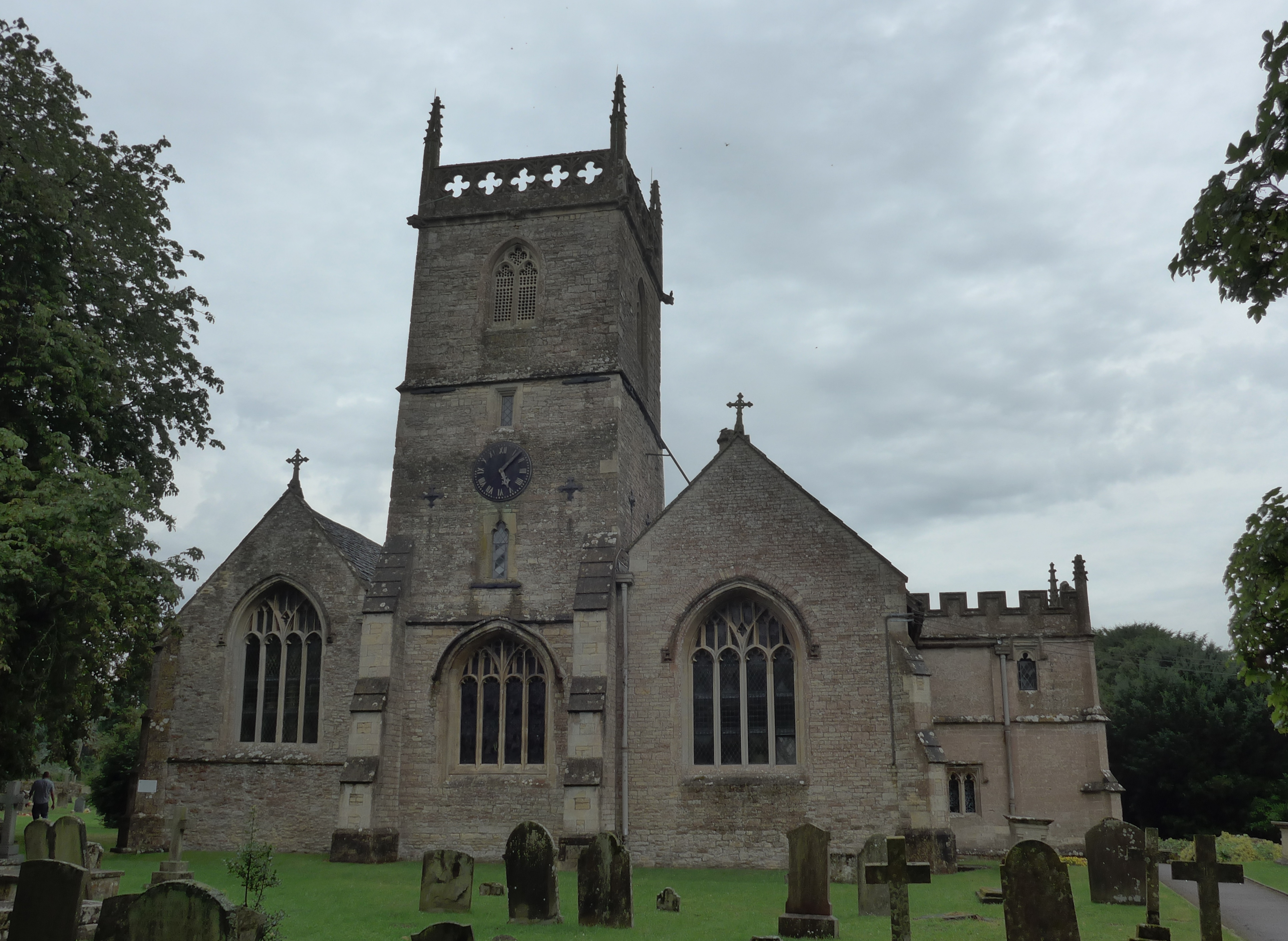
Crudwell All Saints

George Ingram's own will, as from Crudwell, requested that he be buried there in the churchyard not in the church, with a simple headstone recording that he was rector there for 45 years. He left £70 between the poor of Crudwell and Hankerton, and provided that instead of a funeral feast there should be distributed loaves of bread to every poor family of the parishes. His bequests to his servants and clerical colleagues were generous. Being unmarried, he made his niece Elizabeth (daughter of his brother Charles) his executrix and residuary legatee, and gave £400 in money and East India Company bonds to his mother (then aged 93). He left £11.15s.Od. "to Mr Hearle of Penryn in Cornwall my Chamber fellow in Oxon... in payment of a broad piece of gold of his I found and never returned to him."

By a separate Codicil made at the same time as his will and referred to in the principal document, he made a special bequest of two thousand pounds of new South Sea Annuities to his servant Ann Evans in Trust to provide for herself an annuity of £40 for life and the residue for the maintenance and marriage portion of her daughter Ann Evans by herself or by such guardian as she shall think fit to appoint. Also he leaves to her one of his horses and much of his household stuff at Crudwell; and "my poor dogs to them that will take care of them". He has little to leave to his nephew Charles but choice of his books and pictures, and his love and blessing. A letter to his niece is included in the probate enjoining her to "be kind to Nanny Evans who deserves it", and to be kind to her grandmother. Elizabeth proved the will three times, at first with 6 codicils on 17 May 1763, then on 8 June 1763 with 5 codicils, and again with 5 codicils on 15 December 1766, having voluntarily surrendered the former probate.

== Portraits ==
Among his bequests to nephew Charles is (by the last Codicil, transmitted by a servant) the choice of pictures in his rooms at Westminster: "Master set once and paid a Guinea New Pavement Charing Cross, If Mr Ingram pleases he may have it". There are two portraits of the 8th Viscount in the collections at Temple Newsam. Both were among a series of Ingram portraits acquired by the gift of Lord Halifax in 1948 and with the assistance of an Art Fund (National Art Collections Fund) grant in 1993. Both are in clerical garb. The younger portrait, in an oval frame, shows George with long and full brown curly hair and holding a pair of gloves, with a classical landscape behind. The more mature and conservative image has him in a long grey wig against a dark background.

Peerage of Scotland
Preceded by Henry Ingram	Viscount of Irvine; 1761–1763	Succeeded by Charles Ingram
