= Charles Eversfield =

British Tory politician (1683 – 1749)

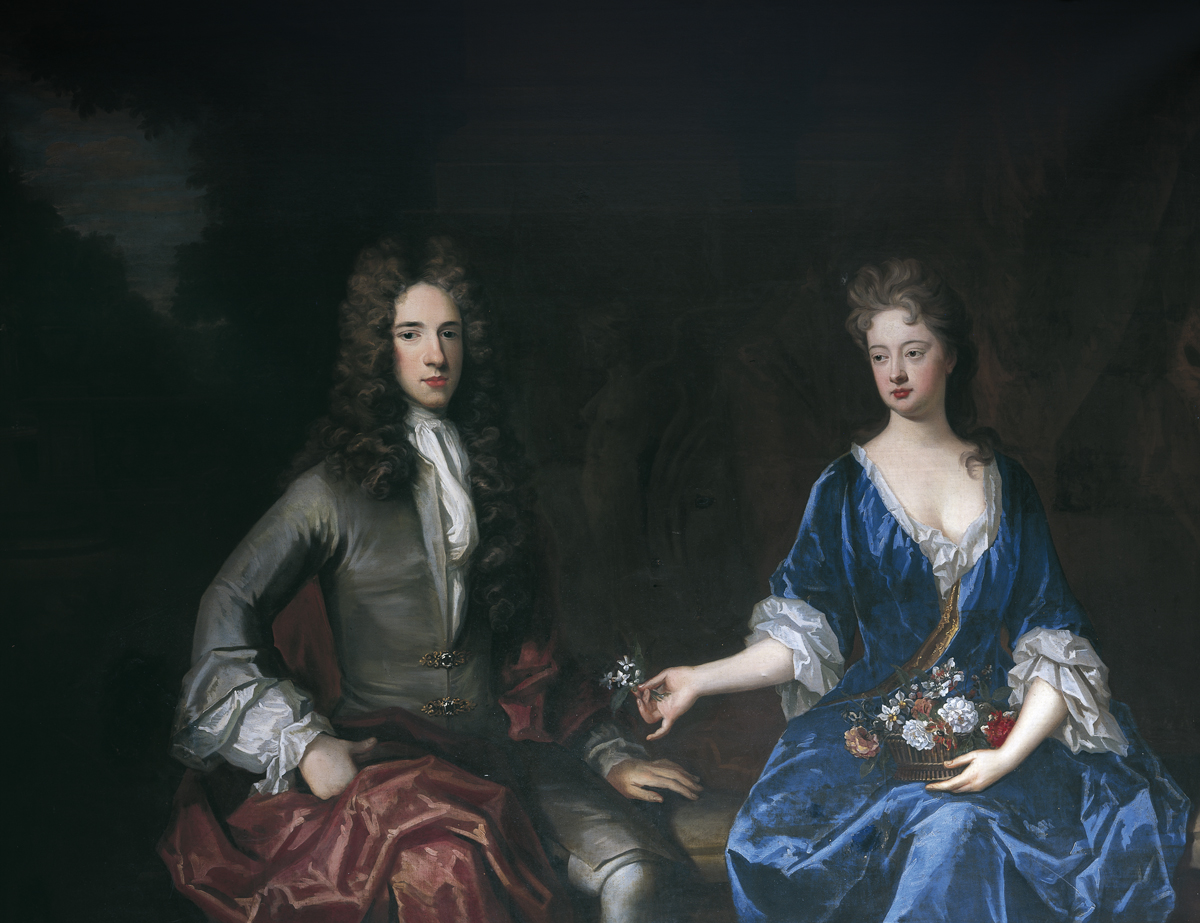
Portrait of Charles Eversfield and his wife, attributed to a follower of Godfrey Kneller. Horsham Museum, Horsham, Sussex

Charles Eversfield (15 September 1683 – 1749) of Denne Place, near Horsham, Sussex, was a British Tory politician who sat in the House of Commons between 1705 and 1747.

== Early life ==
Eversfield was the only son of Nicholas Eversfield of Charlton Court, near Steyning, Sussex and his wife, Elizabeth Gildridge, daughter of Nicholas Gildridge of Eastbourne, Sussex. In 1684, he succeeded to the estates of his father. He married Mary Duncombe, daughter of Henry Duncombe of Weston, Surrey on 21 July 1702.

== Career ==
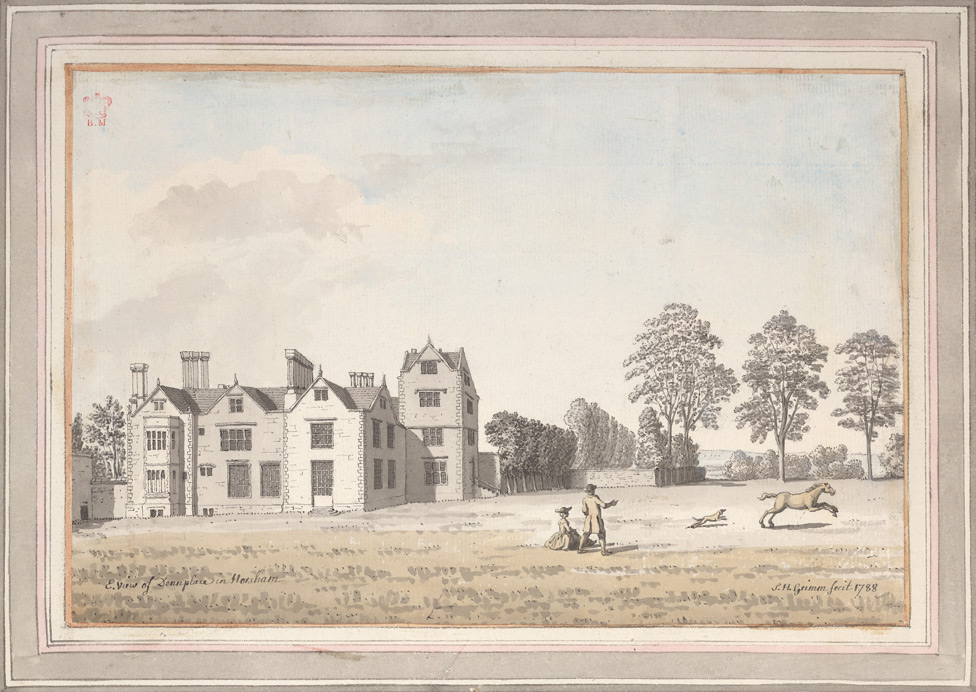
Denne Park, near Horsham. Watercolour by Samuel Hieronymus Grimm

In 1695, Eversfield inherited the estate of Denne from his uncle Anthony Eversfield and with it an electoral interest at Horsham. As soon as he came of age, he successfully contested Horsham at the 1705 English general election, being listed as a ‘Churchman’. He was relatively inconspicuous in his first Parliament but voted against the Court candidate for Speaker on 25 October 1705. He was returned again for Horsham, as a Tory at the 1708 British general election. He acted as a teller on 8 March 1709 against the election of Thomas Meredyth for Midhurst and voted against the impeachment of Dr Sacheverell in 1710. At the 1710 British general election, he was returned for both Horsham and for Sussex and chose to sit for Sussex. In this Parliament he was one of the spokesmen for the October Club. He obtained a place as Paymaster and treasurer of Ordnance in 1712. He was returned again at the 1713 but lost his place as Paymaster on George I's accession in 1714.

At the 1715 British general election, he was defeated at Sussex and was unseated on petition at Horsham on 16 June 1715. He was therefore left without a seat. He came to an agreement with his opponents, the Ingrams, to share the representation of Horsham and he was returned there unopposed at a by-election on 12 June 1721. He was returned for Horsham at the 1722 British general election and went over to the Government. He spoke for them in an army debate on 26 October 1722. He was returned again For Horsham in 1727 and 1734. He then voted regularly with the government and helped the Duke of Newcastle in county elections. In 1737 he sold his burgages at Horsham to the Ingrams, and in 1741 was returned as MP for Steyning, continuing to vote with the Government. He was classed as an Old Whig in 1746, and did not stand in 1747.

== Later life and legacy ==
Eversfield made a second marriage on 9 August 1731, to Henrietta Maria Lady Jenkinson, widow of Sir Robert Jenkinson, 3rd Baronet and daughter of Charles Scarborough of Windsor, Berkshire. He died on 17 June 1749 leaving a son and four daughters by his first wife and two illegitimate daughters. His eldest son Charles succeeded to a baronetcy created for Henry Fermor.

Parliament of England
Preceded by John Wicker; Henry Cowper	Member of Parliament for Horsham; 1705–1707; With: Henry Cowper	Succeeded by Parliament of Great Britain
Parliament of Great Britain
Preceded by Parliament of England	Member of Parliament for Horsham; 1707- 1710; With: Henry Goring; John Wicker 1708	Succeeded by John Middleton; John Wicker
Preceded by Sir Henry Peachey, Bt; Peter Gott	Member of Parliament for Sussex; 1710–1713; With: Sir George Parker, Bt	Succeeded by Henry Campion; John Fuller
Preceded by John Middleton; John Wicker	Member of Parliament for Horsham; 1713–1715; With: John Middleton; Sir Henry Goring, Bt 1715	Succeeded by Hon. Arthur Ingram; Arthur Ingram
Preceded by Hon. Arthur Ingram; Arthur Ingram	Member of Parliament for Horsham; 1721–1741; With: Arthur Ingram; Hon. Henry Ingram 1722; Hon. Charles Ingram1737	Succeeded by Sir Richard Mill, Bt; Hon. Charles Ingram
Preceded by Hitch Younge; Marquess of Carnarvon	Member of Parliament for Steyning; 1741–1747; With: Hitch Younge	Succeeded by Hitch Younge; Abraham Hume
