= Henry Ingram =

Henry Ingram may refer to:

- Henry Ingram, 1st Viscount of Irvine (1640–1666)
- Henry Ingram, 7th Viscount of Irvine (1691–1761), English landowner and politician
