= Viscount of Irvine =

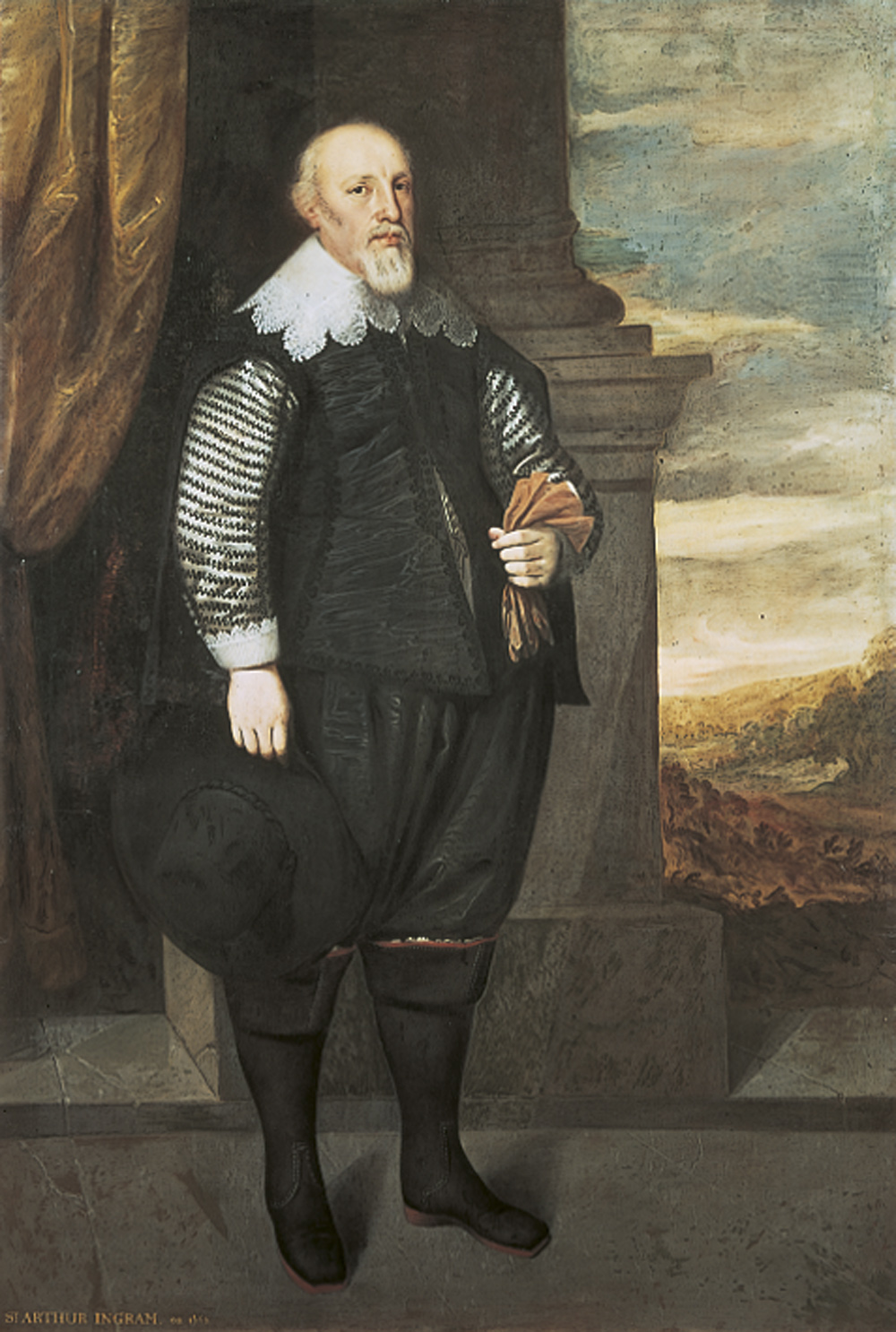
Sir Arthur Ingram (c. 1565–1642), ancestor of the Viscounts of Irvine.

Viscount of Irvine was a title in the Peerage of Scotland. It was created on 23 May 1661 for Henry Ingram, of Temple Newsam, Yorkshire, and Hoar Cross Hall, Staffordshire. He was made Lord Ingram at the same time, also in the Peerage of Scotland.

Henry was the grandson of Sir Arthur Ingram (c. 1565–1642), and on 7 June 1661 he married Essex, daughter of Edward (Montagu), 2nd Earl of Manchester by his third wife, Essex Cheke. Both of their sons succeeded to the Viscountcy, though the elder died in childhood. Lord Ingram's second son, the 3rd Viscount, was Member of Parliament for Scarborough and Yorkshire and served as Lord Lieutenant of the East Riding of Yorkshire. He married Isabella, daughter of John Machell (MP for Horsham). Five of their sons, the 4th, 5th, 6th, 7th and 8th Viscounts, all succeeded in the titles. The 5th Viscount was also Lord Lieutenant of the East Riding of Yorkshire. The 6th and 7th Viscounts were both Members of Parliament for Horsham and Lord Lieutenant of the East Riding of Yorkshire. The Dowager Isabella Ingram outlived all her sons and died in 1764 aged 94. The 8th Viscount was succeeded by his nephew, Charles, the 9th Viscount, the only son of Colonel the Honourable Charles Ingram, seventh son of the 3rd Viscount. The 9th Viscount also represented Horsham in Parliament, as did his father. The titles became extinct on his death in 1778.

The Honourable Isabella Ingram, eldest daughter of the 9th Viscount, was a mistress of George IV.

== Viscounts of Irvine (1661) ==
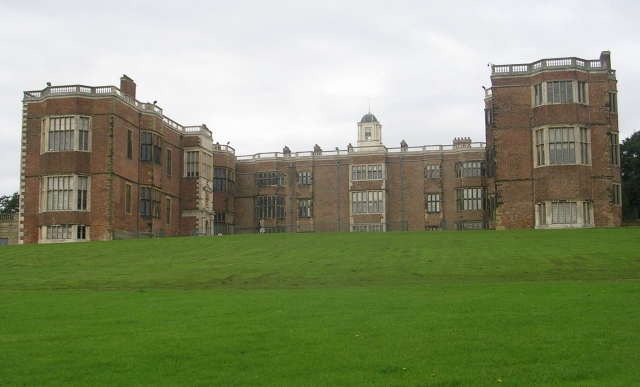
Temple Newsam near Leeds, seat of the Viscounts of Irvine

- Henry Ingram, 1st Viscount of Irvine (1620–1666)
- Edward Ingram, 2nd Viscount of Irvine (1663–1668)
- Arthur Ingram, 3rd Viscount of Irvine (1666–1702)
- Edward Ingram, 4th Viscount of Irvine (1686–1714)
- Rich Ingram, 5th Viscount of Irvine (1688–1721)
- Arthur Ingram, 6th Viscount of Irvine (1689–1736)
- Henry Ingram, 7th Viscount of Irvine (1691–1761)
- George Ingram, 8th Viscount of Irvine (1694–1763)
- Charles Ingram, 9th Viscount of Irvine (1727–1778)
