= Anne Ingram, Viscountess Irvine =

British court official

The Right Honourable The Viscountess Irvine
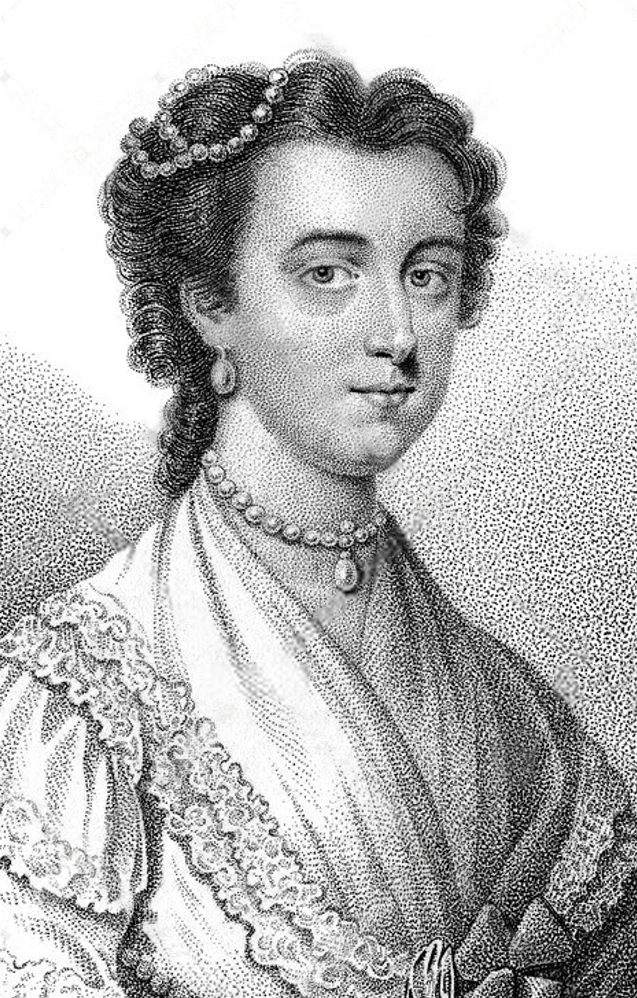

Personal details
- Born: Lady Anne Howard c. 1696
- Died: 2 December 1764 (aged 67–68)
- Spouses: Rich Ingram, 5th Viscount of Irvine (m. 1717; died 1721) William Douglas (m. 1737; died 1747)
- Relations: Arthur Capell, 1st Earl of Essex (grandfather); Lady Elizabeth Percy (grandmother)
- Parent(s): Charles Howard, 3rd Earl of Carlisle; Lady Anne Capel
- Occupation: Poet

Anne, Viscountess Irvine (c. 1696 – 2 December 1764), was a British court official. She was a poet and a correspondent of Sir John Vanbrugh and Horace Walpole.

== Early life ==
Anne was born c. 1696 and was raised in Yorkshire. Her father was Charles Howard, 3rd Earl of Carlisle and her mother was Anne Capel. Her maternal grandparents were Arthur Capell, 1st Earl of Essex and Lady Elizabeth Percy. By 1712, her parents were irretreviably separated, and Anne seems to have remained close to her father; some of her letters to him survive. She wrote a poem that was a tribute to her father, "Castle Howard" in 1732.

== "An Epistle to Mr. Pope" ==
One of Ingram's most renowned poems is "An Epistle to Mr. Pope, Occasioned by his Characters of Women" that she wrote in response to Alexander Pope’s poem "Epistle 2. To a Lady" and his other poems where he addresses women. To argue against Pope's differentiation, she creatively alters the rhyming couplet form Pope used to emphasize what both sexes have in common: the love of power. Many lines in this poem are slightly altered from Pope or exactly quoted in a different context, "For love of power is still the love of fame" ("Epistle 2. To a Lady," lines 207–10; "An Epistle to Mr. Pope," line 22).

Her poetry defended women from the usual accusations of being manipulative and inferior.

== Personal life ==
Around December 1717, Lady Anne was married to Rich Ingram, 5th Viscount of Irvine. Lord Irvine served as Governor of Kingston-upon-Hull from 1715 until his death from smallpox in 1721, four years after their marriage. Anne, who had no children with her first husband, traveled by herself to the Netherlands and France in 1730, and in 1736, she became an attendant of the Princess of Wales, Augusta of Saxe-Gotha, wife of Frederick, Prince of Wales and, later, mother of King George III.

It was not until 1737 that Anne remarried, after sixteen years of widowhood. She married Colonel William Douglas of Kirkness an MP for Kinross-shire, despite the disapproval of her family. Douglas died on 5 August 1747. Anne died 2 December 1764, and is buried near her second husband at Kew.
