= Arthur Ingram, 6th Viscount of Irvine =

British landowner and politician

Arthur Ingram, 6th Viscount of Irvine (21 December 1689 – 30 May 1736), styled the Honourable Arthur Ingram until 1721, was a British landowner and politician who sat in the House of Commons from 1715 until 1721 when he succeeded to the peerage as Viscount Irvine.

Ingram was the third son of Arthur Ingram, 3rd Viscount of Irvine, by Isabella Machell, daughter of John Machell, Member of Parliament for Horsham, of Hills, Sussex. He was returned to Parliament for Horsham in 1715, a seat he held until 1721, when he succeeded his elder brother Rich in the viscountcy. This was a Scottish peerage and did not entitle him to an automatic seat in the House of Lords although he was forced to resign his seat in Parliament as Scottish peers were barred from sitting in the House of Commons. In 1728 he was made Lord-Lieutenant of the East Riding of Yorkshire, which he remained until his death.

The 6th Viscount died unmarried but testate in May 1736, aged 46, and was succeeded in the viscountcy by his younger brother, Henry. A portrait of Arthur the 6th Viscount, by Charles Jervas, is in the collection of Temple Newsam.

Parliament of Great Britain
Preceded by Charles Eversfield; Sir Henry Goring, Bt	Member of Parliament for Horsham; 1715–1721; With: Arthur Ingram	Succeeded by Henry Ingram; Charles Eversfield
Honorary titles
Preceded by The Earl of Bath	Lord-Lieutenant of the East Riding of Yorkshire; 1728–1736	Succeeded by Sir Conyers Darcy
Peerage of Scotland
Preceded by Rich Ingram	Viscount of Irvine; 1721–1736	Succeeded by Henry Ingram
