= William Douglas of Kirkness =

Brigadier-General William Douglas

Member of Parliament for Kinross-shire
- In office 1715–1722
- Preceded by: Sir John Malcolm
- Succeeded by: John Hope

Personal details
- Born: 1688
- Died: 1747 (aged 58–59)
- Party: Whig
- Spouse: Anne Ingram, Viscountess Irvine (m. 1737)
- Parent(s): Sir Robert Douglas; Jean Balfour Oliphant

Brigadier-General William Douglas (1688–1747), of Kirkness, Kinross, was a British Army officer and politician who sat in the House of Commons from 1715 to 1722.

== Early life ==
Descended from the Earls of Morton, William Douglas was the eldest son of Sir Robert Douglas of Kirkness by Jean, daughter of John Balfour, 3rd Lord Balfour of Burleigh, widow of George Oliphant of Gask, Perth.

== Career ==
Douglas was elected Member of Parliament for Kinross-shire as a Whig at the 1715 general election. As an alternating seat, the constituency was not represented at the 1722 general election. No votes of his are recorded, nor did he stand again.

First commissioned in 1709, Captain Douglas joined Croft's Light Dragoons from which, in 1720, he was appointed to the Coldstream Guards.

He served with distinction in the War of the Austrian Succession, and was given the command of the 32nd Regiment of Foot soon after the Battle of Fontenoy (1745). The 32nd Regiment served briefly in England in 1745/46 in the army of the Duke of Cumberland and subsequently did 'good service' in Lancashire. They were employed in Scotland on the dispersal of the clans, remaining there but a short time, as they could ill be spared from Flanders.

== Personal life ==
On 11 June 1737, Douglas married Anne, third daughter of Charles Howard, M.P., 3rd Earl of Carlisle, as her second husband, at St. George's, Hanover Square, contrary to the wishes of her relatives. Anne was the widow of Rich Ingram, 5th Viscount of Irvine, who had died in 1721. She was appointed in 1736 a Lady of the Bedchamber to the Princess of Wales (mother of George III), and for the rest of her life was a prominent figure at Court. She was forced to keep her second marriage with Douglas a secret for fear of losing her paid position in the royal household. She was author of several poems, and is noticed in Duncombe's Feminead.

Brigadier-General Douglas died in Brabant on 5 August 1747, falling a victim to the unhealthiness of the climate. As he died without children, on his death, his sister Isabel was retoured heir to him. There is a memorial to him on the north wall of St. Anne's Church, Kew. His widow, Anne, died 2 December 1764, and is buried near her second husband at Kew.

Parliament of Great Britain
Preceded by Sir John Malcolm (to 1713)	Member of Parliament for Kinross-shire; 1715–1722	Succeeded by John Hope (from 1727)
Military offices
Preceded by Henry Skelton	Colonel of the 32nd Regiment of Foot; 1745–1747	Succeeded by Francis Leighton
