= Charles Ingram (politician) =

British soldier and politician (1696–1748)

Colonel The Honourable Charles Ingram

Member of Parliament for Horsham
- In office 1737–1748
- Preceded by: Henry Ingram
- Succeeded by: Sir Lionel Pilkington

Personal details
- Born: 27 March 1696
- Died: 28 November 1748 (aged 52)
- Spouse(s): Elizabeth Brace, née Scarborough (m. 1726; died 1739)
- Children: 4, including Charles
- Parents: Arthur Ingram, 3rd Viscount of Irvine (father); Isabella Machel (mother)
- Relatives: Henry (brother)
- Occupation: Soldier, politician

Military service
- Branch/service: British Army
- Rank: Colonel

Colonel Charles Ingram (27 March 1696 – 28 November 1748) was a British soldier and politician.

Ingram was the seventh of the nine sons of Arthur Ingram, 3rd Viscount of Irvine (known as Irwin in England), by Isabella Machel, daughter of John Machell, Member of Parliament for Horsham, of Hills, Sussex. He was a general in the British Army. In 1737 he was returned to Parliament for Horsham (succeeding his elder brother Henry), a seat he held until his death.

Ingram married Elizabeth Brace, née Scarborough, widow of Francis Brace, sister of Ann, the wife of his brother Henry, and daughter and co-heiress of Charles Scarborough, Clerk of the Board of Green Cloth, of Windsor, Berkshire, in 1726. They had one son, Charles, later 9th Viscount of Irvine, and three daughters. Elizabeth died in December 1739. Ingram survived her by nine years and died in November 1748, aged 52.

There is a portrait of Colonel Charles Ingram with two of his children, by Philippe Mercier, in the collections of Temple Newsam.

Parliament of Great Britain
| Preceded by Charles Eversfield; Hon. Henry Ingram | Member of Parliament for Horsham; 1737–1748; With: Charles Eversfield 1737–1741; Sir Richard Mill, Bt 1741–1747; Charles Ingram 1747–1748 | Succeeded by Charles Ingram; Sir Lionel Pilkington, Bt |
