= Custos Rotulorum of the East Riding of Yorkshire =

This is a list of people who have served as Custos Rotulorum of the East Riding of Yorkshire.

- Sir William Babthorpe bef. 1544–1555
- Christopher Estoft bef. 1558–1566
- John Vaughan bef. 1573–1577
- Ralph Rokeby 1577 – aft. 1584
- Thomas Knyvet, 1st Baron Knyvet bef. 1594 – aft. 1608
- Sir William Constable, 1st Baronet bef. 1621–1626
- Sir William Alford 1626 – aft. 1636
- Sir William Strickland, 1st Baronet 1642–1646
- Interregnum
- Sir John Hotham, 2nd Baronet 1660–1680
- John Sheffield, 3rd Earl of Mulgrave 1680–1682
- Charles Seymour, 6th Duke of Somerset 1682–1687
- John Sheffield, 3rd Earl of Mulgrave 1687–1689
- Thomas Osborne, 1st Duke of Leeds 1689–1699
- John Holles, 1st Duke of Newcastle 1699–1711
- Peregrine Osborne, 2nd Duke of Leeds 1711–1715
- Rich Ingram, 5th Viscount of Irvine 1715
- Richard Boyle, 3rd Earl of Burlington 1715–1721
- William Pulteney 1721–1728

For later custodes rotulorum, see Lord Lieutenant of the East Riding of Yorkshire.
