= Robert de Yarburgh-Bateson, 3rd Baron Deramore =

British peer

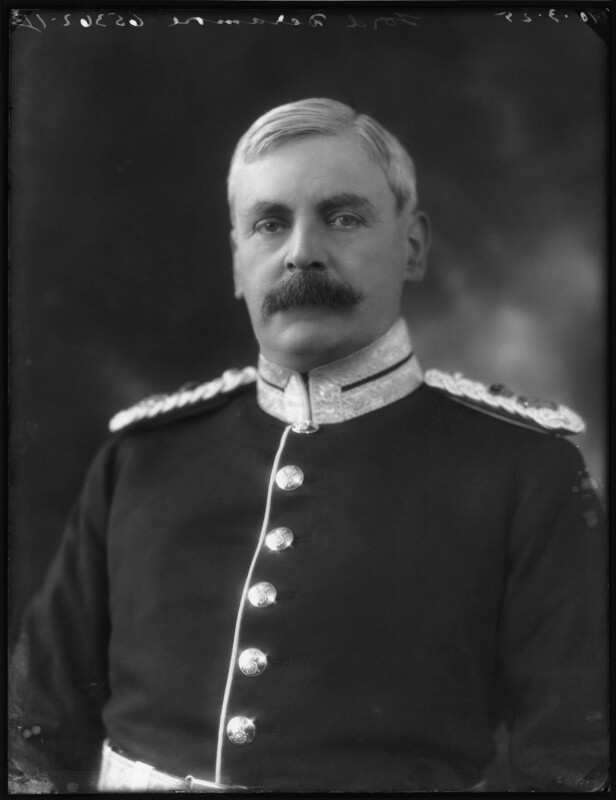
Yarburgh-Bateson in 1925

Lieutenant-Colonel Robert Wilfrid de Yarburgh-Bateson, 3rd Baron Deramore TD (5 August 1865 – 1 April 1936) was a British peer and an officer in the Yorkshire Hussars. He served as Lord Lieutenant of the East Riding of Yorkshire from 1924 until his death in 1936.

He was the eldest son of George de Yarburgh-Bateson, 2nd Baron Deramore, and his wife Mary Yarburgh (whose surname the family assumed in 1876). He was educated at Eton College. In April 1891, he was appointed a deputy lieutenant of the East Riding of Yorkshire. He succeeded his father in the peerage in 1893.

Commissioned into the Yorkshire Hussars as a second lieutenant on 4 January 1893, he was promoted captain on 28 April 1897, major on 18 June 1904, and lieutenant-colonel on 2 June 1915. He was awarded the Territorial Decoration on 20 June 1913.

On 15 July 1897, he married (Caroline) Lucy Fife; before she died on 26 October 1901, they had one daughter:

- Hon. Moira Faith Lilian de Yarburgh-Bateson (9 June 1898 – 21 December 1982), married first John Robert Rankin Fullerton (d. 1966) on 24 October 1919, annulled 1923, and second Sir Edward Chichester, 10th Baronet on 5 June 1924, divorced 1935.

Deramore married again on 26 June 1907, to Blanche Violet Saltmarshe (2 July 1884 – 30 December 1972). They had no children.

He was appointed Lord Lieutenant of the East Riding of Yorkshire on 31 December 1924, an office he held for the rest of his life. He was succeeded by his younger brother George.

Honorary titles
Preceded by The Lord Nunburnholme	Lord Lieutenant of the East Riding of Yorkshire; 1924–1936	Succeeded by The Lord Middleton
Peerage of the United Kingdom
Preceded by George de Yarburgh-Bateson	Baron Deramore; 1893–1936	Succeeded by George de Yarburgh-Bateson
