= Chippendale Society =

British charity

- Formation: 1965; 61 years ago
- Type: Historical society
- Legal status: Charity
- Purpose: Historical study and research
- President: The Lord St Oswald
- Website: The Chippendale Society
- Remarks: Patron:

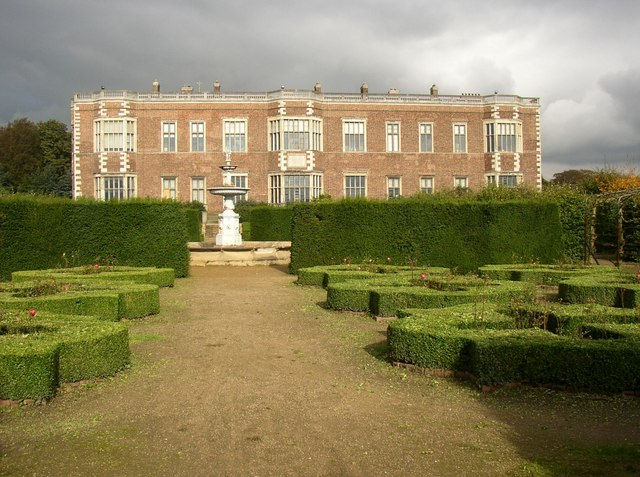
Temple Newsam House (south wing), Colton, Leeds, England, home of the Chippendale Society's Collection, seen from Temple Newsam Park.

The Chippendale Society is a registered charity in Britain, that works to preserve and promote the heritage of Thomas Chippendale, one of Britain's most notable furniture makers. The society was founded in 1965 in Otley in Yorkshire, England, Chippendale's home town. Its mission is to advance public education in the matter of British craftsmanship, specifically Georgian, and particularly that of Thomas Chippendale whose designs and methods are still employed today.

The society, governed by a board of twelve trustees, owns a collection of Chippendale furniture and memorabilia, which is kept at Temple Newsam House in Leeds, and has access to other Chippendale collections, at Harewood House and Dumfries House. Chippendale furniture is highly valued; a padouk cabinet that was auctioned by Christie's in 2008 sold for £2,729,250 (US$5,324,763).

In January 2013 the BBC produced a series entitled "Carved With Love; The Genius of British Woodwork", the second episode of which featured Chippendale's life, work and influence.

== See also ==
- The Furniture Society
- Furniture History Society
