= Arthur Ingram (died 1742) =

British Member of Parliament

Arthur Ingram (died 1742) served as a member of Parliament for Horsham.

== Background ==
He was the son of Arthur Ingram (died 1693) of Borrowby (Note: There are two places in England called Borrowby, both in North Yorkshire, and it is unclear which this one was. However, a legal document of 1686 mentions an Arthur Ingram of Borrowby Grange, and a Borrowby Grange is recorded on the Ordnance Survey map just west of Borrowby, Hambleton.) by Jane Mallory, daughter of Sir John Mallory of Studley, Yorkshire. He married Elizabeth Barns, by whom he had one daughter.

== Office ==
He was appointed for Horsham by petition from his relatives, the Ingram Viscounts of Irvine, in whose interest he voted consistently. He served from 16 June 1715 to 1722. He was commissioner for forfeited estates from 1716 to 1725.
