= Temple Newsam Preceptory =

Templar farmstead in England

Coordinates: 53.77369°N 1.46696°W

Temple Newsam Preceptory (grid reference SE353309) was a Templar farmstead, just east of Leeds, in West Yorkshire, England. The term "preceptory" may be paraphrased as a "school of principles", and was the generic term for Templar communities.

== Geography and archaeology ==
The site was south of the current Temple Newsam House, between Pontefract Lane and the River Aire. The site may be found on pre-1991 maps as Temple Thorpe Farm, which it overlapped to the south, and is now a few yards to the south-east of junction 45 on the M1 motorway. Any archaeological remains are now entirely destroyed by open cast mining. Excavations in 1903 found human remains, stone coffins and a possible chapel. A rescue dig in 1989-1991 failed to find the chapel, which was surmised to be under an industrial spoil heap to the south. The remains of a large cruciform barn, 50.5 by 13 metres (166 by 43 ft), were discovered, a possible dovecote, barrel pits, and part of a moat.

== History ==
The Templars acquired the site sometime before 1181, being the death date of the Archbishop of York to whom the charter of confirmation was addressed. The Order held the property until it was dissolved in 1307. The land controlled by the preceptory would have taken in much of the present estate, and extended to the Aire in the south, which may have been used to export wool via the Cistercian port at Hull.

The main purpose of the preceptory seems to have been sheep-farming, and therefore the production of wool, although it also maintained the church at Whitkirk, a mile to the North-East of the present house. In 1185 the preceptory was recorded as having a fulling mill shortly after acquiring the site.

The excavated part of the site is presumed to have fallen into disrepair by 1347, when Colton Beck was diverted through the dovecote. The cause of the diversion may have been provision for a mill, which implies continued use, possibly further south towards the river.
