= Arthur Ingram, 3rd Viscount of Irvine =

English Member of Parliament and peer

The Right Honourable The Viscount of Irvine

Member of Parliament for Yorkshire
- In office 1701–1702
- Preceded by: The Lord Fairfax of Cameron; Sir John Kaye
- Succeeded by: Sir John Kaye; Marquess of Hartington

Member of Parliament for Scarborough
- In office 1693–1701
- Preceded by: Francis Thompson; John Hungerford
- Succeeded by: Sir Charles Hotham; William Thompson

Personal details
- Born: Arthur Ingram; 25 January 1666
- Died: 21 June 1702 (aged 36)
- Relations: Edward Montagu, 2nd Earl of Manchester (grandfather)
- Children: 9
- Parent(s): Henry Ingram, 1st Viscount of Irvine; Lady Essex Montagu

Arthur Ingram, 3rd Viscount of Irvine (25 January 1666 – 21 June 1702) was an English Member of Parliament and peer. He was the Vice-Admiral of Yorkshire and Member of Parliament for Yorkshire and Scarborough. He was the father or grandfather of all the later Viscounts Irvine.

== Early life ==
The 3rd Viscount Irvine was the younger of two sons of the 1st Viscount, Henry Ingram, of Temple Newsam, and younger brother of the 2nd Viscount, Edward Ingram (c. 1662–1688). Edward inherited the title at the age of 4, on his father's death, and therefore their mother the Viscountess Essex Ingram, née Montagu (daughter of Edward Montagu, 2nd Earl of Manchester), was the more important parental example. Arthur lived a little longer than his father and brother, both of whom died at the age of 26.

== Career ==
Arthur inherited the titles and the benefit of his brother's estate in 1688.

From 1693 to 1701, he served as a Member of Parliament for Scarborough. From 1701 to 1702, he was MP for Yorkshire.

From 1692 to 1702, he served as Vice-Admiral of Yorkshire and from 1699 to 1702, he served as Lord Lieutenant of the North Riding of Yorkshire.

== Personal life ==
In October 1685, when he was 19 and she 15 years old, Arthur married Isabella Machell (1670–1764) in London at St Benet Gracechurch, although that church was then being rebuilt (1681–1686). Isabella was the eldest daughter of the former Helena Warmestry, and John Machell (1637–1704) of Hills Place, MP for Horsham. The marriage reinforced older Machell connections with the Rich family, from which Viscountess Essex Ingram, Arthur's mother, was also descended. In 1691 Isabella's sister Caecilia Maria married John Parsons at All Hallows-on-the-Wall, and they had a daughter Helena. Together, Arthur and Isabella were the parents of nine sons, heirs to the Viscountcy, who were born between 1686 and 1701, including:

- Edward Machell Ingram, 4th Viscount of Irvine (1686–1714)
- Rich Ingram, 5th Viscount of Irvine (1688–1721)
- Arthur Ingram, 6th Viscount of Irvine (1689–1736)
- Henry Ingram, 7th Viscount of Irvine (1691–1761)
- Hon. John Ingram (1693–1715)
- George Ingram, 8th Viscount of Irvine (1694–1763)
- Hon. Charles Ingram (1696–1748)
- Hon. Thomas Ingram (1698–1698), who died infancy.
- Hon. William Ingram (1701–1756)

The 3rd Viscount made his will on 12 June 1702, giving half his estate to Lady Isabella, and £2000 each in trust for his younger sons, but noting that if John Machell settled his estate on the second son, Rich, his portion should be shared among the others. Lady Isabella was to have their guardianship and upbringing. He died on 21 June 1702, and was buried at Whitkirk on 8 July 1702. John Machell (who often stayed at Temple Newsam) died in 1704, entailing all of his valuable estate at Horsham in Sussex to descend to his grandchildren, commencing with the second, Rich Ingram (since the eldest was to inherit Temple Newsam). This was (according to his will) on condition that any so inheriting should change their name to Machell, a proviso which was not respected. Isabella outlived all her sons and died in 1764 at the age of 94.

=== Legacy ===
A portrait reputed to be of Arthur the 3rd Viscount is at Temple Newsam, and he also features in a landscape hunting scene by Leonard Knyff. A portrait of Isabella (Machell), Viscountess Irwin, by John Closterman, is also at Temple Newsam.

Parliament of England
Preceded by Francis Thompson; John Hungerford	Member of Parliament for Scarborough; 1693–1701; With: John Hungerford 1693–1695; Sir Charles Hotham 1695–1701	Succeeded by Sir Charles Hotham; William Thompson
Preceded by The Lord Fairfax of Cameron; Sir John Kaye	Member of Parliament for Yorkshire; 1701–1702; With: The Lord Fairfax of Cameron	Succeeded by Sir John Kaye; Marquess of Hartington
Honorary titles
Preceded by The Earl of Mulgrave	Vice-Admiral of Yorkshire; 1692–1702	Succeeded by The Earl of Burlington
Preceded by The Duke of Leeds	Lord Lieutenant of the North Riding of Yorkshire; 1699–1702	Succeeded by The Marquess of Normanby
Peerage of Scotland
Preceded by Edward Ingram	Viscount of Irvine; 1688–1702	Succeeded by Edward Machell Ingram
