= Charles Ingram, 9th Viscount of Irvine =

British landowner, politician and courtier (1727–1778)

Charles Ingram, 9th Viscount of Irvine (19 March 1727 – 27 June 1778), known as Charles Ingram until 1763, was a British landowner, politician and courtier. He succeeded his uncle to the Viscountcy and the Temple Newsam estate in Leeds in 1763.

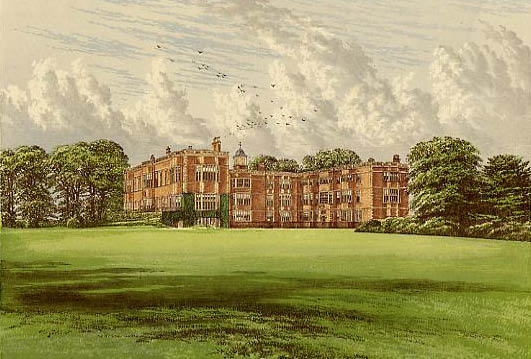
Temple Newsam, 1880

Ingram was the son of Colonel the Honourable Charles Ingram, seventh son of Arthur Ingram, 3rd Viscount of Irvine. His mother was Elizabeth Scarborough, daughter and heiress of Charles Scarborough, of Windsor, Berkshire. He was returned to Parliament for Horsham in 1747, a seat he held until 1763, when he succeeded his uncle George Ingram, 8th Viscount of Irvine in the viscountcy. This was a Scottish peerage and did not entitle him to an automatic seat in the House of Lords although he was forced to resign his seat in Parliament as Scottish peers were barred from sitting in the House of Commons. He was also a Groom of the Bedchamber to the Prince of Wales from 1756 to 1760 and 1760 to 1763 (after the Prince had succeeded to the throne as George III). In 1768 he was elected a Scottish representative peer, which he remained until his death ten years later.

Lord Irvine married Frances Shepheard, daughter of Samuel Shepheard MP, of Exning, Suffolk, in 1758. They had five daughters. The eldest daughter, the Honourable Isabella Ingram, married the 2nd Marquess of Hertford and also became the mistress of the Prince of Wales, later George IV.

In the 1760s Charles employed Capability Brown to re-landscape the park at Temple Newsam. The work was continued by his widow, who rebuilt the south wing and lived at Temple Newsam until her death in 1807. There is a portrait of Charles, 9th Viscount Irwin, by Benjamin Wilson, in the collections at Temple Newsam.

Lord Irvine died in June 1778, aged 51. As he had no sons and as there were no more male-line descendants of the first Viscount the viscountcy became extinct on his death. Temple Newsam passed to Isabella, Lady Hertford on Lady Irvines's death in 1807.

== Arms ==
Coat of arms of Charles Ingram, 9th Viscount of Irvine
| Crest A Cock proper Escutcheon Ermine on a Fess Gules three Escallops Or Supporters Dexter: a Griffin proper; Sinister: an Antelope proper horned maned tufted and unguled Or ducally gorged Gules Motto Magnanimus Esto |

Parliament of Great Britain
| Preceded by Hon. Charles Ingram; Sir Richard Mill, Bt | Member of Parliament for Horsham; 1747–1763; With: Hon. Charles Ingram 1747–1748; Sir Lionel Pilkington, Bt 1748–1763 | Succeeded by Sir Lionel Pilkington, Bt; Robert Pratt |
Peerage of Scotland
| Preceded by George Ingram | Viscount of Irvine; 1763–1778 | Extinct |
