= William Newman (woodcarver) =

English woodcarver

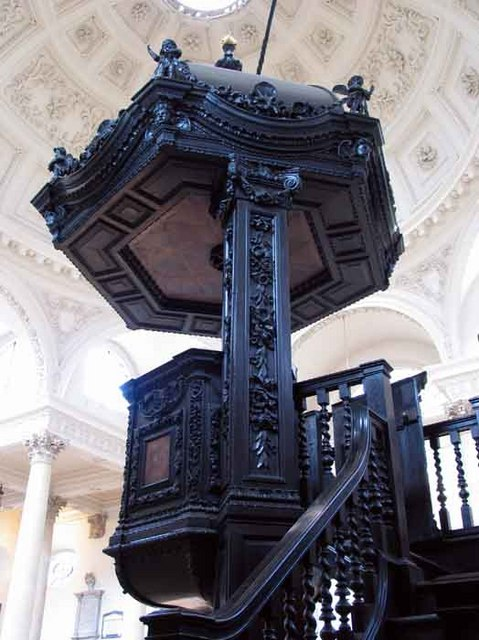
Pulpit and tester at St Stephen Walbrook. The tester features '6 Boys and ffestoones' by William Newman.

William Newman (born c. 1649, flourished 1670–1694) was an English woodcarver (ornamental sculptor) of the Restoration period. He collaborated in the furnishing of the churches of the City of London rebuilt by Sir Christopher Wren after the Great Fire of London. A number of his works survive including some of his preparatory drawings. It has been emphasised that, despite the persistent idea that Grinling Gibbons was responsible for much of the carving in the rebuilt City churches, in the building accounts and parish minute-books Gibbons's name appears only once, in connection with the exceptional altarpiece at St Mary Abchurch, a church which also contains carvings by William Newman and William Emmett.

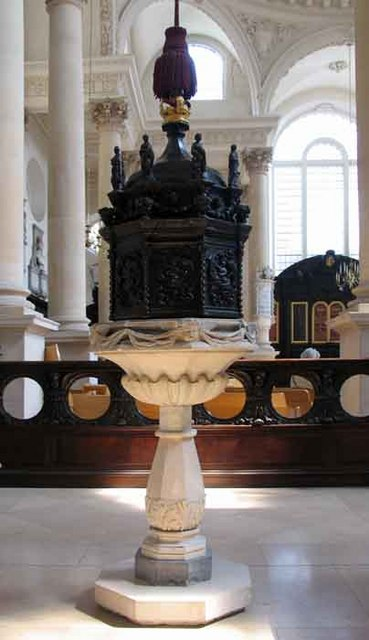
Font-cover at St Stephen Walbrook.

== The Weavers' Company Hall ==
Accounts for the furnishing of the Weavers' Company Hall (which was rebuilt after the Fire by 1669) show that in 1671 and 1672 Newman was paid for carvings in the Parlour, and for various images on the Hall Stairs. These included heads of leopards and wyverns, probably derived from the Company's heraldry.

== St Stephen, Coleman Street ==
In 1676–77 Newman was employed for making the altar-table and rails, and the altar-piece, for Wren's rebuilding of St Stephen Coleman Street. The church was destroyed by bombing in 1940. The following description exists: "Communion Table and Rails. Table: with moulded top carved with acanthus-ornament, moulded stretchers carved with flowers and raised in a segmental curve in the middle of the long sides; the table is supported at the angles by large carved eagles and in the middle of the front and back is a seated cherub. Rails: with carved and panelled standards, turned, twisted and carved balusters, carved upper and lower rails."

== St Stephen Walbrook ==
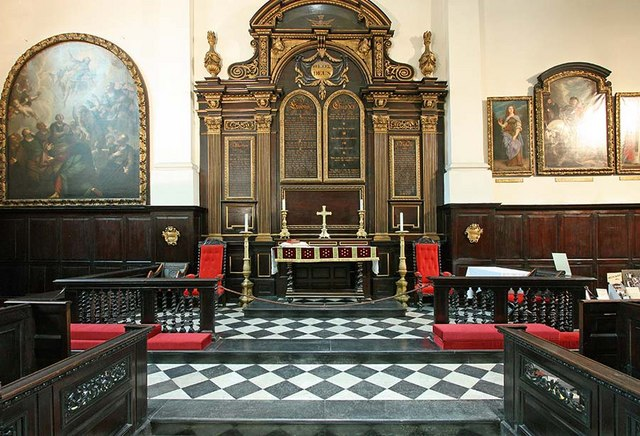
Reredos at St Martin Ludgate

The wooden furnishings of St Stephen Walbrook were prepared by the joiners Thomas Creecher and Stephen College, and the carvers William Newman and Jonathan Maine. Newman rendered accounts in 1677–78 for the altarpiece, which incorporated the Royal Arms now mounted on the organ-casing. The Guildhall Collections also include designs by Thomas Creecher and William Newman for the pulpit and font, which were submitted competitively for selection. Newman's accounts refer to '36-foot of huske at 6d. per ffoot': '6 Boys an ffestoones at 30s each': '30-foot of Lace at 2d per fft': '30 ffoot of large Rafel leaves at 1s per fft', and so forth. His work for the 'tipe and pulpit', the 'altarpiece', the 'raile and banesters' and the 'fonte' (he carved eight small figures for the font-cover) was appraised and valued on 27 April 1680. In 1681–82 Creecher and Newman were again employed to construct wainscots ten feet high for the Vestry room, and screens for the east and west doors.

== St Martin Ludgate ==
The surviving reredos at St Martin Ludgate may incorporate Newman's work, in the cherub heads, palm fronds and urns featured within the tall pedimented structure. Work at this church in 1683–86 was carried out by three joiners, Athew, Draper and Poulden, and by the carvers Cooper and William Newman.

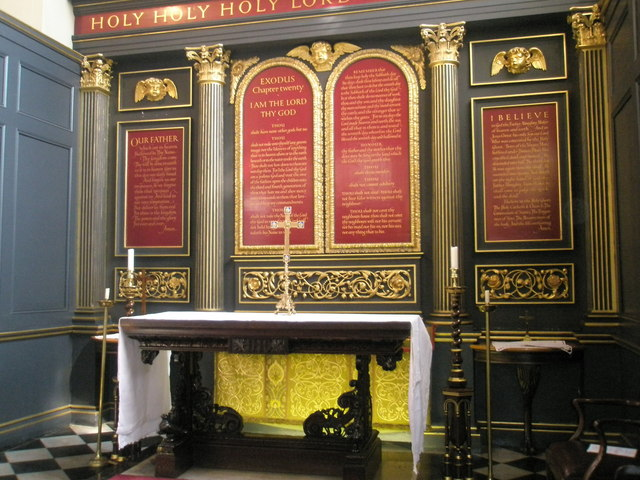
The reredos and communion table at St James Garlickhythe.

== St James Garlickhythe ==
The church of St James Garlickhythe was rebuilt by Wren between 1676 and 1683. The reredos (from which the pediment has been removed), the communion rail and communion table, and the churchwarden's pews, are among the original furnishings. 'The woodwork and carving throughout are exceptionally good, the joiners having been (J.) Fuller and (William) Cleer and the carver William Newman.' (In the present church there are also furnishings brought from St Michael Queenhithe when the parishes were combined in 1876.)

== Family ==
On 6 September 1679 a Licence was issued for the marriage of William Newman, Carver, of St Alphege London Wall, then a bachelor aged about 30, to Anne Machell of Cobham, Surrey, then a spinster aged about 25. She was the daughter of Mathew Machell of West Horsley by his second wife Jane Smither née Downe, sister and coheir of John Downe of Cobham. Anne was the half-sister of John Machell.
