= List of governors of Kingston upon Hull =

Below is a list of those who have held the office of Governor of Kingston upon Hull:

== Governors of Kingston upon Hull ==
- 1536: John Hallam
- 1546–1552: Sir Michael Stanhope (beheaded, 1552)
- ?-1639: Sir John Hotham, 1st Baronet
- 1639–1641: Sir Thomas Glemham
- 1642–?: William Cavendish, 1st Duke of Newcastle (Royalist)
- 1642–?1645: Sir John Hotham, 1st Baronet (Parliamentary) (beheaded by Parliament, 1645)
- 1645: Ferdinando Fairfax, 2nd Lord Fairfax of Cameron (Parliamentary)
- 1645: Sir Thomas Fairfax (Parliamentary) Robert Overton served as his nominee until 1648;
- 1648–1654: Robert Overton (arrested for his alleged involvement in the Wildman conspiracy)
- 1655-1659: Henry Smith
- 1659: Robert Overton
- 1660–1661: Charles Fairfax
- 1661–1673: John Belasyse, 1st Baron Belasyse
- 1673–1679: James Scott, 1st Duke of Monmouth
- 1679–1682: John Sheffield, 3rd Earl of Mulgrave
- 1682–1687: Thomas Hickman-Windsor, 1st Earl of Plymouth
- 1687–1689: Marmaduke Langdale, 2nd Baron Langdale
- 1689–1699: Thomas Osborne, 1st Duke of Leeds
- 1699–1711: John Holles, 1st Duke of Newcastle-upon-Tyne
- 1711–1715: Richard Sutton
- 1715–1721: Rich Ingram, 5th Viscount of Irvine
- 1721–1725: Thomas Stanwix
- 1725–1732: George Cholmondeley, 2nd Earl of Cholmondeley
- 1732–1738: Edward Montagu
- 1738–1740?: Charles Spencer, 3rd Duke of Marlborough
- 1740–1741: James Dormer
- 1743–1766: Harry Pulteney
- 1766–1785: Philip Honywood
- 1785–1794: James Murray
- 1794–1795: George Townshend, 1st Marquess Townshend
- 1795–1801: William Harcourt, 3rd Earl Harcourt
- 1801–1808: John de Burgh, 13th Earl of Clanricarde
- 1808–1813: Sir William Medows
- 1813–1814: Charles Lennox, 4th Duke of Richmond
- 1814–1830: Rowland Hill, 1st Baron Hill
- 1830–1843: William Cathcart, 1st Earl Cathcart

== Lieutenant-Governors of Hull ==
- 1645–1648: Robert Overton
- 1711–1714: Bernard Granville
- 1749–1782: Lord Robert Manners
- 1782–1789: William Cashell
- 1789–1801: Thomas Jones
- 1801–1816: Francis Cunynghame
- 1816–1854: Sir Charles Wade Thornton
