= Isabella Ingram-Seymour-Conway, Marchioness of Hertford =

English landowner, courtier, and royal mistress (1759–1834)

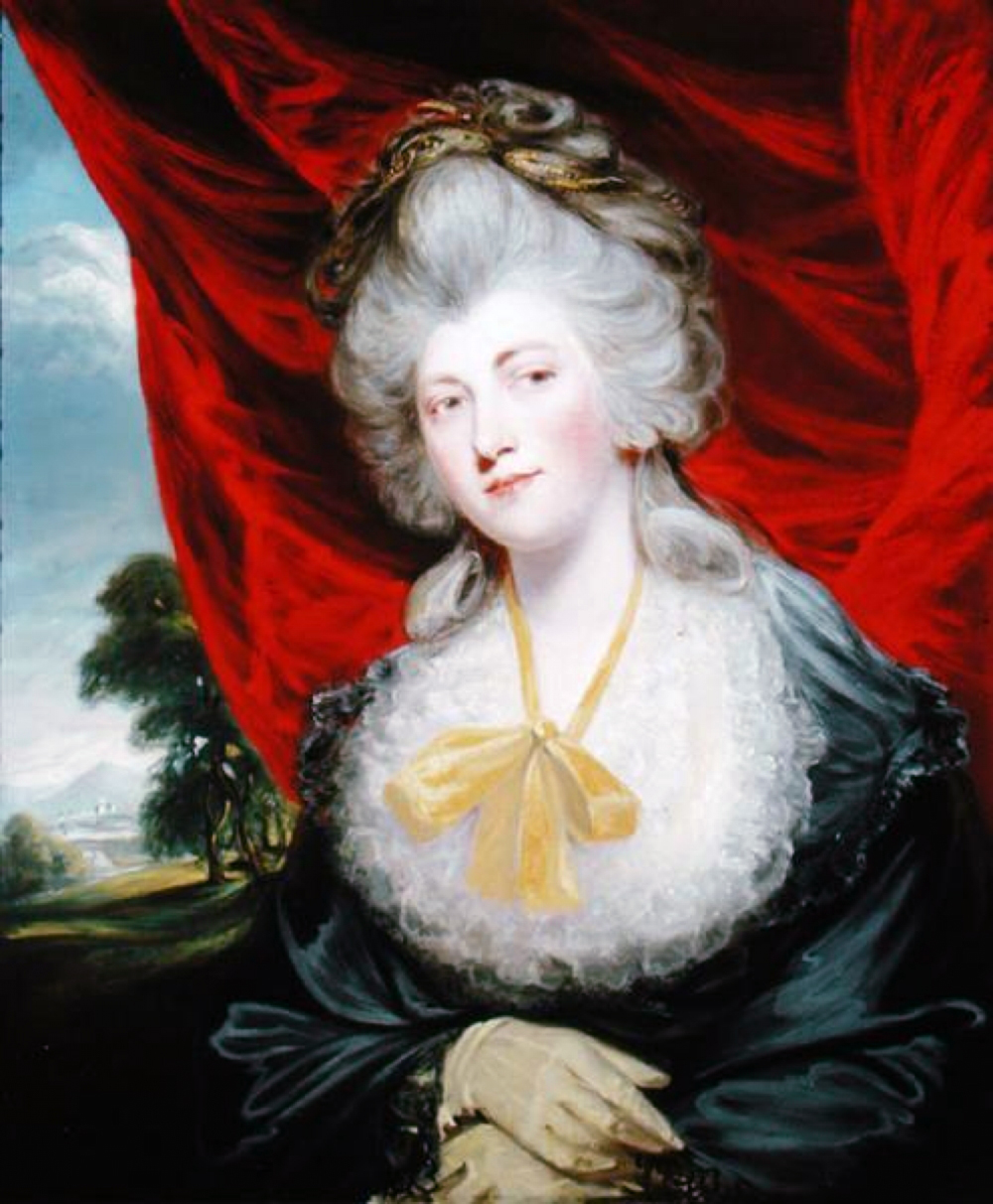
Lady Hertford, as painted by John Hoppner, ca. 1800

Isabella Anne Seymour-Conway, Marchioness of Hertford (7 July 1759 – 12 April 1834) was an English landowner and courtier and a mistress of King George IV when he was Prince of Wales. She was born at Temple Newsam in Leeds, and was the eldest daughter of Charles Ingram, 9th Viscount of Irvine, and his wife Frances Gibson Shepheard Ingram. She married Francis Ingram-Seymour-Conway, 2nd Marquess of Hertford, in 1776, at age sixteen, being his second wife. She was known as Lady Beauchamp until 1794 when her husband succeeded his father.

Isabella was co-heiress to Temple Newsam along with her four sisters, and owned properties in Worcestershire, Norfolk, Ireland and London.

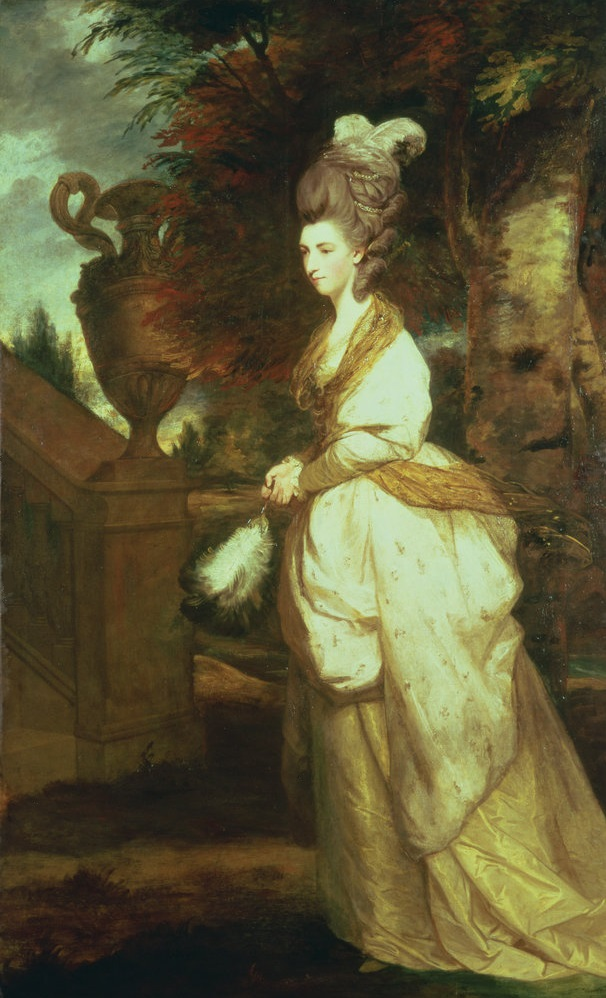
Lady Beauchamp by Joshua Reynolds, 1777 or 1778

Tall, handsome, and elegant, she caught the attention of the Prince of Wales most likely at a ball or concert at Manchester House, the London home of the Hertfords. George was also friends with Isabella's son, Lord Yarmouth, born in 1777. In 1806, the Hertfords became guardians to Mary 'Minney' Seymour, a favourite of the Prince. Charles was made Master of the Horse in 1804 and a Knight of the Garter in 1807.

At first, Isabella rejected George's advances, causing him to become depressed. He made a visit to Isabella's mother at Temple Newsam in 1806 whilst attending Doncaster races as an excuse to see Isabella. George became obsessed with Isabella and became ill when parted from her so that the Hertfords travelled to London to see him and George was miraculously cured. In 1807, Isabella, now almost fifty, began a relationship with George who was then in his mid-forties. As a result, the Prince was a regular guest at Hertford House, Hertford's London residence, and Ragley Hall in Warwickshire. A Tory herself, she was influential in turning the Prince toward the Tories and away from the Whigs, and used her London residence as the headquarters for Tory sympathisers. Isabella was criticised by the House of Lords and in the press for her influence on George; satirical prints by George Cruikshank and others were produced.

The Marchioness's predecessor as the Prince Regent's mistress had been Maria Fitzherbert, a Roman Catholic. Other Catholics disapproved of the Marchioness's influence over the prince, referring to "the fatal witchery of an unworthy secret influence" that they felt had turned him against the idea of Catholic emancipation. George Canning, speaking for the party in power, made use of these comments to say that, if Lady Hertford was really responsible for the prince's political decisions, she was "Britain's guardian angel". Isabella made a point of humiliating Mrs Fitzherbert and by 1811 the Prince had formally separated from her.

On the death of her mother in 1807, she inherited Temple Newsam in West Yorkshire, where the Prince of Wales had paid her a visit. She and her husband added the name of Ingram to their surname due to the fortune they inherited from her family. Lavish entertainments were held at Hertford House attended by the Prince, members of the royal family and visiting nobles, including for victory celebrations in 1814. Isabella's dresses were reported in the press including a Greek-style ostrich feather head-dress worn in 1813 styled on the Prince's crest.

Lady Hertford's relationship with the Prince, now prince regent, ended in 1819, when he turned his attentions to Elizabeth Conyngham, Marchioness Conyngham. According to Greville’s diary for 9 June 1820:

Somebody asked Lady Hertford if she had been aware of the King's admiration for Lady Conyngham, and whether he had ever talked to her about Lady C. She replied that 'intimately as she had known the King, and openly as he had always talked to her upon every subject, he had never ventured to speak to her upon that of his mistresses'.

Isabella continued to spend the season in London, but otherwise lived at Temple Newsam. Here she busied herself with charitable works, being the patron or member of many events and societies, and was noted for her benevolence to the poor as well as her generosity to the servants at Temple Newsam who held an annual ball and supper in the house. Lady Hertford died in 1834 after catching a cold on her way from Temple Newsam to London by carriage. Her obituary in The Leeds Intelligencer described her as 'Her intellectual character, and high attainments, formed the least part of her excellencies; however enlightened her mind, her heart was warmer still. To the poor and the distressed her munificence was all but unbounded'.

== See also ==
- English royal mistress
