= Borrowby =

Borrowby may refer to:

- Borrowby, Hambleton, North Yorkshire, England
- Borrowby, Scarborough, North Yorkshire, England
