= Lord Lieutenant of the East Riding of Yorkshire =

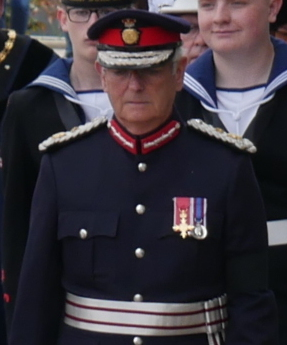
James Dick, Lord Lieutenant of the East Riding of Yorkshire

This is a list of people who have served as Lord Lieutenant for the East Riding of Yorkshire. The office was established after the English Restoration in 1660, when a Lord Lieutenant was appointed for each Riding of Yorkshire. Since 1721, all Lord Lieutenants have also been Custos Rotulorum of the East Riding of Yorkshire, and for part of the period also Lieutenants of the Town and County of the Town of Kingston upon Hull. It was abolished on 31 March 1974 with the creation of the county of Humberside, but was re-created upon the abolition of Humberside on 1 April 1996.

== Lord Lieutenants of the East Riding of Yorkshire to 1974 ==
- John Belasyse, 1st Baron Belasyse 26 July 1660 – 12 April 1673
- James Scott, 1st Duke of Monmouth 12 April 1673 – 20 December 1679
- John Sheffield, 3rd Earl of Mulgrave 20 December 1679 – 17 November 1682
- Charles Seymour, 6th Duke of Somerset 17 November 1682 – 13 October 1687
- John Sheffield, 3rd Earl of Mulgrave 13 October 1687 – 5 October 1688
- Henry Cavendish, 2nd Duke of Newcastle-upon-Tyne 5 October 1688 – 26 March 1689
- William Pierrepont, 4th Earl of Kingston-upon-Hull 26 March 1689 – 17 September 1690
- Thomas Osborne, 1st Duke of Leeds 21 March 1691 – 11 August 1699
- John Holles, 1st Duke of Newcastle-upon-Tyne 11 August 1699 – 15 July 1711
- vacant
- Peregrine Osborne, 2nd Duke of Leeds 29 March 1713 – 16 December 1714
- Rich Ingram, 5th Viscount of Irvine 16 December 1714 – 10 April 1721
- William Pulteney, 1st Earl of Bath 7 December 1721 – 15 July 1728
- Arthur Ingram, 6th Viscount of Irvine 15 July 1728 – 30 May 1736
- Sir Conyers Darcy July 1736 – 22 February 1738
- Henry Ingram, 7th Viscount of Irvine 22 February 1738 – 4 April 1761
- vacant
- Francis Osborne, Marquess of Carmarthen 1 August 1778 – 22 March 1780
- Frederick Howard, 5th Earl of Carlisle 22 March 1780 – 8 April 1782
- Francis Osborne, 5th Duke of Leeds 8 April 1782 – 31 January 1799
- Frederick Howard, 5th Earl of Carlisle 1 March 1799 – 29 September 1807
- Henry Phipps, 1st Earl of Mulgrave 29 September 1807 – 10 September 1824
- George Howard, 6th Earl of Carlisle 10 September 1824 – 31 January 1840
- Paul Thompson, 1st Baron Wenlock 31 January 1840 – 18 June 1847
- George Howard, 7th Earl of Carlisle 18 June 1847 – 5 December 1864
- Beilby Lawley, 2nd Baron Wenlock 6 December 1864 – 6 November 1880
- Marmaduke Constable-Maxwell, 11th Lord Herries of Terregles 21 December 1880 – 6 October 1908‡
- Charles Wilson, 2nd Baron Nunburnholme 14 November 1908 – 15 August 1924‡
- Robert Wilfrid de Yarburgh-Bateson, 3rd Baron Deramore 30 December 1924 – 1 April 1936‡
- Michael Willoughby, 11th Baron Middleton 8 June 1936 – 17 April 1968‡
- Charles Wood, 2nd Earl of Halifax 17 April 1968 – 31 March 1974 †

The position was abolished on 31 March 1974 by the Local Government Act 1972 and re-established in 1996.

‡His Majesty's Lieutenant of and in the East Riding of the County of York and the Town and County of the Town of Kingston-upon-Hull

† Became Lord Lieutenant of Humberside on 1 April 1974.

== Lord Lieutenants of the East Riding of Yorkshire from 1996 ==
- Richard Marriott, 1 April 1996 – 19 December 2005
- Dame Susan Cunliffe-Lister, 19 December 2005 – 2 November 2019
- James Dick, 2 November 2019 – present

== Deputy Lieutenants ==
A deputy lieutenant of the East Riding of Yorkshire is commissioned by the Lord Lieutenant of the East Riding of Yorkshire. Deputy lieutenants support the work of the lord-lieutenant. There can be several deputy lieutenants at any time, depending on the population of the county. Their appointment does not terminate with the changing of the lord-lieutenant, but they usually retire at age 75.

=== 19th Century ===
- 19 February 1831: Charles Langdale
- 19 February 1831: Sir Thomas Aston Clifford-Constable
- 19 February 1831: Rev. William Blow
- 19 February 1831: Thomas Clark
- 19 February 1831: Robert Denison
- 19 February 1831: William Constable Maxwell
- 19 February 1831: Rev. William Parker
- 19 February 1831: William Scholfield
- 24 February 1831: William Hall
- 24 February 1831: Joseph Robinson Pease
- 24 February 1831: Rev. Christopher Sykes
- 24 February 1831: Avison Terry
- 24 February 1831: Joseph Sykes
- 24 February 1831: Robert Thoroton
- 24 February 1831: Charles Whitaker
- 9 March 1831: Rev. Danson Richardson Currer
- 9 March 1831: Rev. Daniel Ferguson
- 9 March 1831: Mark Foulis
- 9 March 1831: Rev. Henry Ramsden
- 9 March 1831: Sir George Strickland, 7th Baronet
- 9 March 1831: Edward Taylor
- 9 March 1831: Henry Willoughby
- 9 March 1831: Joseph Smyth Windham
- 10 March 1831: Sir Edmund Beckett, 4th Baronet
