= Henry Ingram, 7th Viscount of Irvine =

English landowner and politician

Henry Ingram, 7th Viscount of Irvine (30 April 1691 – 4 April 1761), styled The Honourable Henry Ingram until 1736, was an English landowner and politician.

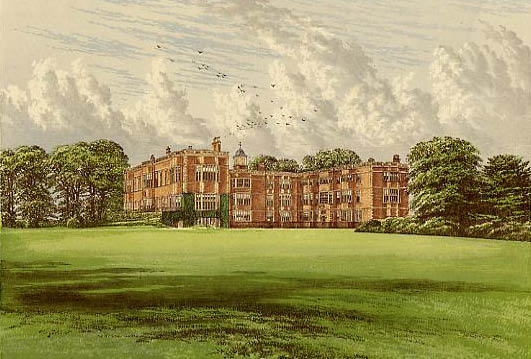
Temple Newsam House from Morris's Country Seats (1880) - Seat of the Viscounts Irvine

Irvine was the fourth son of Arthur Ingram, 3rd Viscount of Irvine, by Isabella Machell, daughter of John Machell, Member of Parliament for Horsham, of Hills, Sussex. He was returned to Parliament for Horsham in 1721 (succeeding his elder brother Arthur), a seat he held until 1736, when he succeeded Arthur in the viscountcy. This was a Scottish peerage and did not entitle him automatically to a seat in the House of Lords although he was forced to resign his seat in Parliament as Scottish peers were barred from sitting in the House of Commons. He also succeeded Arthur as Lord-Lieutenant of the East Riding of Yorkshire, which he remained until his death.

Lord Ingram married Anne Scarborough, daughter and co-heiress of Charles Scarborough, of Windsor, Berkshire, Clerk of the Green Cloth. There were no children from the marriage. He died in April 1761, aged 69, and was succeeded in the viscountcy by his brother George (the sixth son). The Viscountess of Irvine (Anne, wife of the 7th Viscount) died in March 1766.

The portrait of Henry Ingram, 7th Viscount Irwin and his wife Anne, by Philippe Mercier, is at Temple Newsam.

Parliament of Great Britain
| Preceded by Hon. Arthur Ingram; Charles Eversfield | Member of Parliament for Horsham; 1721–1736; With: Charles Eversfield | Succeeded by Charles Eversfield; Hon. Charles Ingram |
Honorary titles
| Preceded by Sir Conyers Darcy | Lord-Lieutenant of the East Riding of Yorkshire; 1738–1761 | Succeeded by The Marquess of Carmarthen |
Peerage of Scotland
| Preceded by Arthur Ingram | Viscount of Irvine; 1736–1761 | Succeeded by George Ingram |
