= Kinross-shire (UK Parliament constituency) =

Parliamentary constituency in the United Kingdom, 1801–1832

- Former county constituency for the House of Commons
- Subdivisions of Scotland: Kinross-shire

1708–1832
- Seats: one
- Created from: Kinross-shire
- Replaced by: Clackmannanshire and Kinross-shire

Kinross-shire was a county constituency of the House of Commons of Great Britain from 1708 until 1800, and of the House of Commons of the United Kingdom from 1801 to 1832.

== Creation ==
Kinross-shire was Scotland's second-smallest county. The British parliamentary constituency was created in 1708 following the Acts of Union, 1707 and replaced the former Parliament of Scotland shire constituency of Kinross-shire. Kinross-shire was paired as an alternating constituency with neighbouring Clackmannanshire. The freeholders of Kinross-shire elected one Member of Parliament (MP) to one Parliament, while those of Clackmannanshire elected a Member to the next.

== History ==
The constituency elected one Member of Parliament (MP) by the first past the post system until the seat was abolished for the 1832 general election. The Representation of the People (Scotland) Act 1832 abolished the alternating constituencies. Kinross-shire was merged with Clackmannanshire into the single constituency of Clackmannanshire and Kinross-shire, electing one Member between them to each Parliament.

== Members of Parliament ==
| Election | Member | Notes | Ref |
|---|---|---|---|
| 1708 | none | | |
| 16 October 1710 | Mungo Graham | Graham's election was overturned on petition and Malcolm replaced him. | |
| 10 February 1711 | Sir John Malcolm, 1st Baronet | Graham's election was overturned on petition and Malcolm replaced him. | |
| 1713 | none | | |
| 28 February 1715 | William Douglas | | |
| 1722 | none | | |
| 9 November 1727 | John Hope (succeeded as Sir John Bruce Hope, 7th Baronet, in 1729) | | |
| 1734 | none | | |
| 21 May 1741 | Sir John Bruce Hope, 7th Baronet | | |
| 1747 | none | | |
| 25 April 1754 | Robert Colvile | | |
| 1761 | none | | |
| 5 April 1768 | Robert Adam | | |
| 1774 | none | | |
| 30 September 1780 | George Graham | | |
| 1784 | none | | |
| 6 July 1790 | George Graham | | |
| 1796 | none | | |
| 2 August 1802 | William Douglas Maclean Clephane | Appointed Commissioner at Trinidad, April 1803. | |
| 23 August 1803 | David Clephane | | |
| 1806 | none | | |
| 16 May 1807 | William Adam | Chose to sit for Kincardineshire. | |
| 17 August 1807 | David Clephane | Appointed a Commissioner of the Excise for Scotland, March 1811. | |
| 25 June 1811 | Thomas Graham | | |
| 1812 | none | | |
| 6 July 1818 | Thomas Graham | Died 28 July 1819. | |
| 16 September 1819 | George Edward Graham | | |
| 1820 | none | | |
| 28 June 1826 | George Edward Graham | | |
| 1830 | none | | |
| 20 May 1831 | Charles Adam | | |
