= Sir Lionel Pilkington, 5th Baronet =

British Member of Parliament

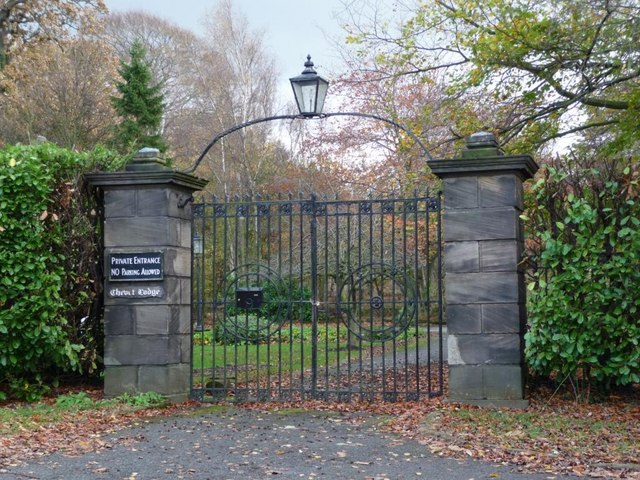
Gates of former Chevet Hall

Sir Lionel Pilkington, 5th Baronet (c.1707 – 11 August 1778) was a British Member of Parliament.

He was the eldest son of Sir Lyon Pilkington, 4th Baronet of Stanley, near Wakefield, Yorkshire and educated at Westminster School (1721) and Christ Church, Oxford (1725). He succeeded his father in 1716.

He was appointed High Sheriff of Yorkshire for 1740–41 and elected MP for Horsham in a by-election in 1748, sitting until 1768. He bought Chevet Hall near Wakefield from his sister-in-law, Anne, where he lived until his death.

He died unmarried in 1778 and was buried at Wakefield. He was succeeded by his brother Sir Michael Pilkington, 6th Baronet.

Baronetage of Nova Scotia
| Preceded by Lyon Pilkington | Baronet (of Stanley); 1716–1778 | Succeeded by Michael Pilkington |
