= Henry Ingram, 1st Viscount of Irvine =

The Right Honourable The Viscount of Irvine

Personal details
- Born: Henry Ingram; 1640 Whitkirk, Yorkshire
- Died: 1666 (aged 25–26)
- Spouse: Lady Essex Montagu (m. 1661)
- Relations: Sir Arthur Ingram (grandfather); Sir Henry Slingsby (grandfather); Sir Thomas Ingram (uncle)
- Children: 3
- Parent(s): Eleanor Slingsby; Sir Arthur Ingram

Henry Ingram (1640 – 1666) was the first to hold the title Lord Ingram, and Viscount Irvine, in the Peerage of Scotland, which in English sources is usually written Viscount Irwin. The Viscountcy existed in four generations of his family before becoming extinct: the seat was at Temple Newsam near Leeds, in Yorkshire.

== Early life ==
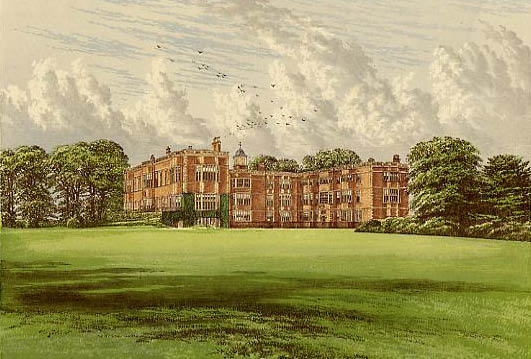
Temple Newsam House, seat of the Viscounts Irvine (from Morris's Country Seats, 1880).

Henry Ingram was baptized at Whitkirk, Yorkshire in 1641. He was the third of four sons (and three daughters) born to the former Eleanor Slingsby (a daughter of Sir Henry Slingsby, MP). and Sir Arthur Ingram Jr. of Temple Newsam (d. 1655), the Sheriff of Yorkshire in 1629 to 1630. His brother, the eldest son, died in infancy. After the death of his mother in 1647, his father remarried to Katherine Fairfax (the second daughter of Thomas Fairfax, 1st Viscount Fairfax of Emley).

His paternal grandparents were the notable landowner and Member of Parliament Sir Arthur Ingram Sr. (1565–1642) and his first wife, the former Susan Brown (daughter of Richard Brown). After his grandmother's death in 1613, his grandfather's remarried to Alice Ferrers, and they were the parents of his half-uncle, Sir Thomas Ingram, who became Chancellor of the Duchy of Lancaster from 1664 to 1672. After Alices' death, Sir Arthur married for a third time to Mary Greville (d. 1661) (a daughter of Sir Edward Greville of Milcote).

His grandfather purchased Temple Newsam in 1622 and, through a destruction by fire in March 1635/6, rebuilt the mansion over the next 20 years, incorporating part of the house formerly belonging to the Earls and Dukes of Lennox in which Henry Stuart, Lord Darnley, father of King James I, had been born in 1545. Henry's father inherited his grandfather's estate upon his death in 1642.

== Career ==
Soon after his father's death in 1655, his elder brother (the second son), Thomas Ingram, married Mary Payler (a daughter of Watkinson Payler of Thoralby and his wife, a sister of Katherine Fairfax). However, Mary died almost immediately, and Thomas died in 1660, so Henry (the third son) became the heir to Sir Arthur at the age of 20, inheriting Temple Newsam and other estates. His stepmother Katherine died in February 1666/7.

On 23 May 1661, Henry was created a Peer of Scotland under the titles Viscount Irvine and Lord Ingram, by Patent, as hereditary titles limited to the male heirs of his body.

== Personal life ==
On 7 June 1661, less than a month after being raised to the peerage, he married Lady Essex Montagu, daughter of Edward Montagu, 2nd Earl of Manchester by his wife Essex Cheke, daughter of Sir Thomas Cheke of Pyrgo and the former Lady Essex Rich (a daughter of Robert Rich, 1st Earl of Warwick). There were three children:

- Edward Ingram (1662-1688), who became the 2nd Viscount. He married Hon. Elizabeth Sherard, sister of Bennet Sherard, 1st Earl of Harborough and eldest daughter of the 2nd Baron Sherard and Elizabeth Christopher (a daughter and co-heiress of Sir Robert Christopher). After his death she married Hon. John Noel of Walcot, a son Baptist Noel, 3rd Viscount Campden.
- Lady Essex Ingram (b. 1664/5), who died in childhood.
- Arthur Ingram (1666–1702), who became the 3rd Viscount and was the progenitor of the later Viscounts.

The 1st Viscount made his will on 9 August 1666, asking to be buried at Whitkirk as near as possible to his father, and making ample provision for his widow, two sons and daughter and his principal servants. He made particular mention of his brother Arthur Ingram, whose line remained important in the immediate circle of the family in the next generations and was seated at Barrowby in Garforth, Yorkshire. His executors were the Earl of Manchester, Lord Henry Stapleton, bart., Henry Slingsby and George Townsend, to all of whom tutelage of the heir Edward was committed, and who all swore to administer at probate on 11 October 1666. Henry was buried at Whitkirk on 13 August 1666. His widow Essex, Viscountess Irvine, died in 1677.

=== Legacy ===
There is a portrait of Henry Ingram, 1st Viscount Irwin, from the school of Peter Lely, in the collections at Temple Newsam, and a portrait of Essex Montagu, Viscountess Irwin, of the same.

Peerage of Scotland
New creation	Viscount of Irvine; 1661–1666	Succeeded by Edward Ingram
