= Henry Cowper (1668–1707) =

English politician

Member of Parliament for Horsham
- In office February 1701 – November 1701
- In office 1702 – 22 March 1707

Personal details
- Born: 1668
- Died: 22 March 1707 (aged 38–39)

Henry Cowper (1668–1707), of Strood Park, Slinfold, Sussex, was an English politician.

He was a member (MP) of the parliament of England for Horsham from February to November 1701 and from 1702 to 22 March 1707.
