= Temple Newsam =

Tudor-Jacobean house in Leeds, West Yorkshire, England

Coordinates: 53.7842°N 1.4595°W

Temple Newsam House
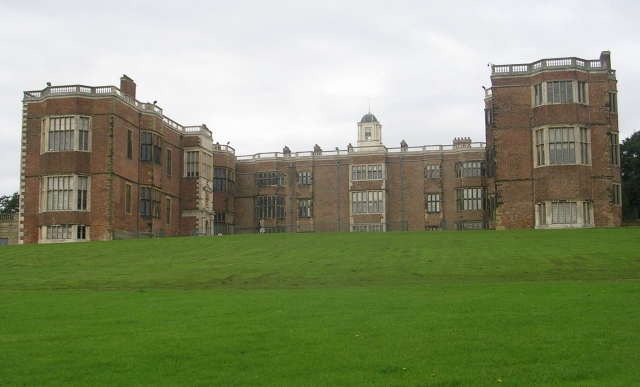
- Temple Newsam House – front view
- Interactive map of Temple Newsam House
- Type: English Country House
- Location: Temple Newsam, Leeds
- OS grid reference: SE357322

History
- Built: 1500–1520

Site notes
- Area: West Yorkshire, England
- Architectural style: Tudor-Jacobean
- Governing body: Leeds Museums and Galleries

Listed Building – Grade I
- Official name: Temple Newsam House
- Designated: 18 October 1951
- Reference no.: 1255943

Temple Newsam (historically Temple Newsham), is a Tudor-Jacobean house in Leeds, West Yorkshire, England, with grounds landscaped by Capability Brown. The house is a Grade I listed building, one of eight Leeds Museums and Galleries sites and part of the research group, Yorkshire Country House Partnership.

The estate lends its name to the Temple Newsam ward of Leeds City Council, in which it is situated, and lies to the east of the city, just south of Halton Moor, Halton, Whitkirk and Colton.

== History ==
=== 1066 to 1520 ===
In the Domesday Book of 1086 the manor is listed as Neuhusam (meaning new houses) and was held by Ilbert de Lacy and his sons. Before the Norman Conquest of 1066 it had been held by Dunstan and Glunier, Anglo-Saxon thanes. In about 1155, Henry de Lacy gave it to the Knights Templar, who built Temple Newsam Preceptory on a site near the present house. The Templars farmed the estate very efficiently, with 1,100 animals. In 1307 the Templars were suppressed, and Edward II granted the manor to Sir Robert Holland who held it until 1323 when he was deprived of his estates. The Knights Hospitaller tried to acquire the estate but they were forced to surrender and in 1327 it was granted to Mary de St Pol, the Countess of Pembroke, who held the manor for 50 years. In 1377 by royal decree the estate reverted to Philip Darcy, 4th Baron Darcy de Knayth (1341–1398). It then passed through several members of the Darcy family, until it was inherited by the 21-year old Thomas Darcy, 1st Baron Darcy de Darcy in 1488. Between 1500 and 1520 a Tudor manor house, known as Temple Newsam House, was built on the site. It has also been spelled "Newsham" in the past.

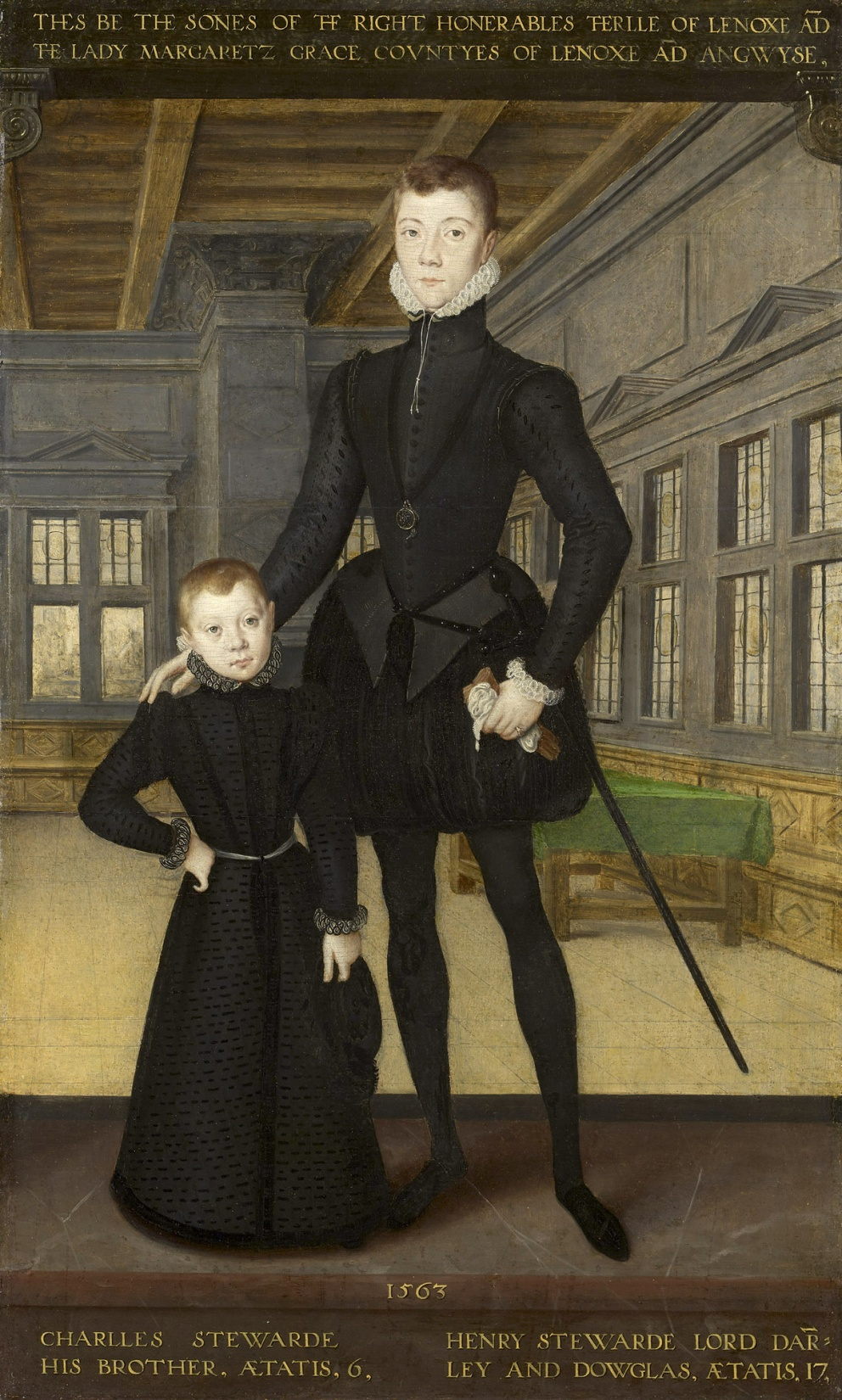
An oil on panel painting from 1563 by Hans Eworth of Henry Stuart, Lord Darnley, and his brother Charles Stuart in a grand interior based on a print by Hans Vredeman de Vries. The continental source for the interior suggests this is not Temple Newsam as it has been wishfully ascribed in the past.

=== 1500 to 1650 ===
In 1537 Thomas, Lord Darcy was executed for the part he played in the Pilgrimage of Grace and the property was seized by the Crown. In 1544 Henry VIII gave it to his niece Lady Margaret Douglas (Countess of Lennox), and she lived there with her husband Matthew Stewart, 4th Earl of Lennox. Their son Henry Stuart, Lord Darnley, who was born in the house in 1545 and educated there, married Mary, Queen of Scots, by whom he was the father of King James VI of Scotland and I of England. A portrait of Henry and his brother was perhaps intended to represent the interior of Temple Newsam despite being based on a continental print of an interior. Following the marriage in 1565, Temple Newsam was seized by Queen Elizabeth I and was managed by an agent.

In 1609 King James I, successor to Elizabeth, granted the estate to his Franco-Scottish second cousin Ludovic Stewart, 2nd Duke of Lennox (1574–1624), who was a favourite of the King and given many titles and estates, including farmland and coalmines in the local area. Despite his opportunities, Ludovic was in constant debt and he mortgaged the estate in 1614 for the sum of £9,000 (around £860,000 in today's money). In 1622 Lennox began the sale of the estate to Sir Arthur Ingram (c. 1565 – 1642), a Yorkshire-born London merchant, civil servant, investor in colonial ventures and arms dealer, for £12,000, which he paid in two instalments, the last in July 1624, after Lennox's death. During the next 20 years the mansion was rebuilt, incorporating some of the previous house in the west wing. The north and south wings were rebuilt and the east wing was demolished after a bad fire in 1635. Arthur's son, also called Arthur, inherited the estate with its debts and continued the building and renovation work. Six months after Charles I was beheaded in 1649, Arthur Ingram the younger was declared delinquent and he compounded his estates and retired to Temple Newsam.

=== 1650 to 1900 ===
After the death of Arthur the younger's eldest son, Thomas, in 1660, Temple Newsam was inherited by Arthur's second son, Henry Ingram, 1st Viscount of Irvine (created a peer of Scotland as Baron Ingram and Viscount of Irvine in 1661 – although the family used the English form "Irwin"). In 1661, Henry married Lady Essex Montagu, daughter of Edward Montagu, 2nd Earl of Manchester, a favourite of Charles II. The estate then passed through Henry's two sons and five grandsons, the last being Henry Ingram, 7th Viscount of Irvine. The 4th Viscount brought back paintings from his Grand Tour of 1704–07. Extant receipts from 1692 show women as well as men were employed to work the estate in haymaking. In 1712, William Etty designed a new approach to the house, with a bridge and ponds. In 1714, Temple Newsam was inherited by Rich Ingram, 5th Viscount of Irvine, and his wife Anne who spent a vast fortune furnishing the house and creating the East Avenue. Between 1738 and 1746, Henry Ingram, 7th Viscount of Irvine remodelled the west and north wings of the house, creating new bedrooms and dressing rooms and the picture gallery. A painting in Leeds Art Gallery by Philippe Mercier of c. 1745 shows Henry and his wife standing in front of Temple Newsam House.

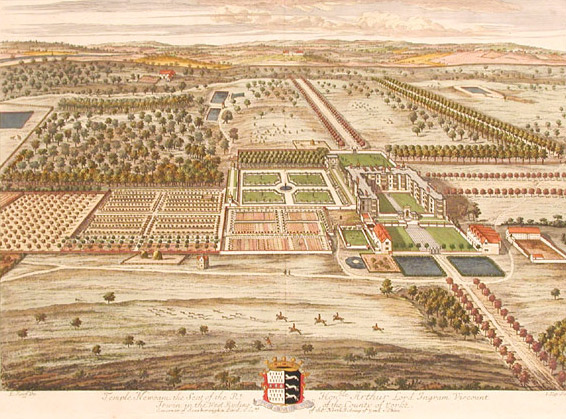
1699 Engraving by Jan Kip after a drawing by Leonard Knyff

In the 1760s, Charles Ingram, 9th Viscount of Irvine, employed Capability Brown to re-landscape the park on the insistence of his wife, Frances Shepheard, daughter of Samuel Shepheard. Reflecting her interest in pastoral landscape design, Frances is depicted as a shepherdess in a portrait by Benjamin Wilson at Temple Newsam. Both Frances and Charles were actively involved in the design and implementation. Some aspects of Brown's plan, such as a large lake depicted in a painting by Michael Angelo Rooker, were never completed. Extant financial records show that in 1759 women as well as men were employed as garden labourers. After Charles died in 1778, Frances rebuilt the south wing in 1796; she lived at Temple Newsam until her death in 1807. Charles and Frances's eldest daughter Isabella Ingram, (later Marchioness of Hertford) (d.1834) who inherited Temple Newsam, was the mistress of the Prince of Wales (later King George IV) from 1806 to 1819. In 1806, George visited Temple Newsam and presented Isabella with Chinese wallpaper, which she hung in the small Drawing Room next to the Great Hall in around 1827, which she later embellished with cut out birds from Audubon's The Birds of America. Lady Hertford inherited the house in 1807; after her husband died in 1822 she spent the season in London, and the rest of the time at Temple Newsam where she involved herself in charitable works including distributing food and clothing to the local people. She allowed the servants to hold an annual supper and ball at Temple Newsam. Reports of poachers were made during 1826 and 1827. During the last years of Isabella's life, the canal, railway and roads encroached on the estate as well as coal mining; and she dealt with the companies setting these up. In 1820 the novelist Sir Walter Scott published Ivanhoe featuring a Templar preceptory named Temple Stowe, believed to have been modelled on Temple Newsam; the name is preserved in local road names such as Templestowe Crescent. At her death in 1834, Isabella left Temple Newsam to her widowed sister, Frances Ingram Shepheard, wife of Lord William Gordon, who died in 1841.

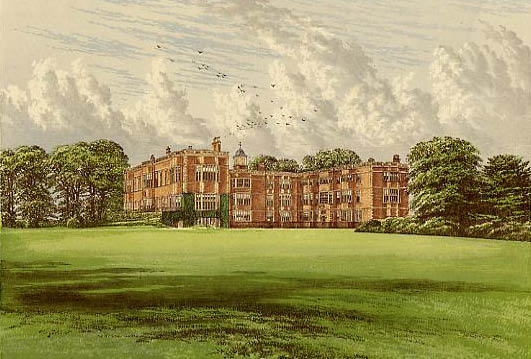
Temple Newsam House from Morris's Country Seats (1880)

In 1841 the estate was inherited by Hugo Charles Meynell Ingram (d. 1869), son of Elizabeth Ingram, sister of Frances Ingram (Lady Gordon), who made no alterations to the estate. In 1868, the Prince of Wales stayed at Temple Newsam during his visit to Leeds to open the Fine Art Exhibition in the New Leeds General Infirmary; temporary triumphal arches were erected on the estate. Following Hugo Charles's death, his son Hugo Meynell-Ingram (d.1871) inherited Temple Newsam; two years later, at his death, his wife Emily Meynell-Ingram (d.1904) inherited the estate. Emily spent a large part of her widowhood at Temple Newsam; she developed it considerably by replacing the sash windows and remodelling the dining room, great staircase and Lord Darnley's room. Emily bequeathed Temple Newsam to her nephew Edward Wood, 1st Earl of Halifax.

=== 20th century ===
In 1909, 610 acres (250 ha) of the estate at Knostrop were compulsorily purchased by Leeds Corporation to build a sewage plant. During the First World War (1914–17) the south wing of the house was turned into a hospital by Edward Wood and his wife Dorothy. Edward Wood fought in France as part of the Yorkshire Hussars, whilst Dorothy oversaw the running of the hospital as part of the Mayors War Committee. In 1922 Edward Wood sold the park and house to Leeds Corporation for a nominal sum, placing covenants over them to ensure their preservation for the future. An offer to purchase the contents for a reduced sum was turned down by the council, resulting in most being sold in 1922.

On 19 October 1923, Temple Newsam was opened to the public along with a golf course. In the Derby Daily Telegraph newspaper, Temple Newsam was compared to Hampton Court Palace. Despite many people visiting the house and using the golf course, the Corporation lost money during the first decade mostly due to poor farming practices. In July 1932, the Great Yorkshire Show was held at Temple Newsam and was a great success. Preparations for war were made as early as April 1939, and in August, small items were being packed up for storage. In September 1939, Temple Newsam was closed to the public and items were moved there for storage from Leeds Art Gallery. It was decided that objects would be displayed, and the house was officially reopened in November 1939, when it was again likened to Hampton Court in the press.

== Architecture ==
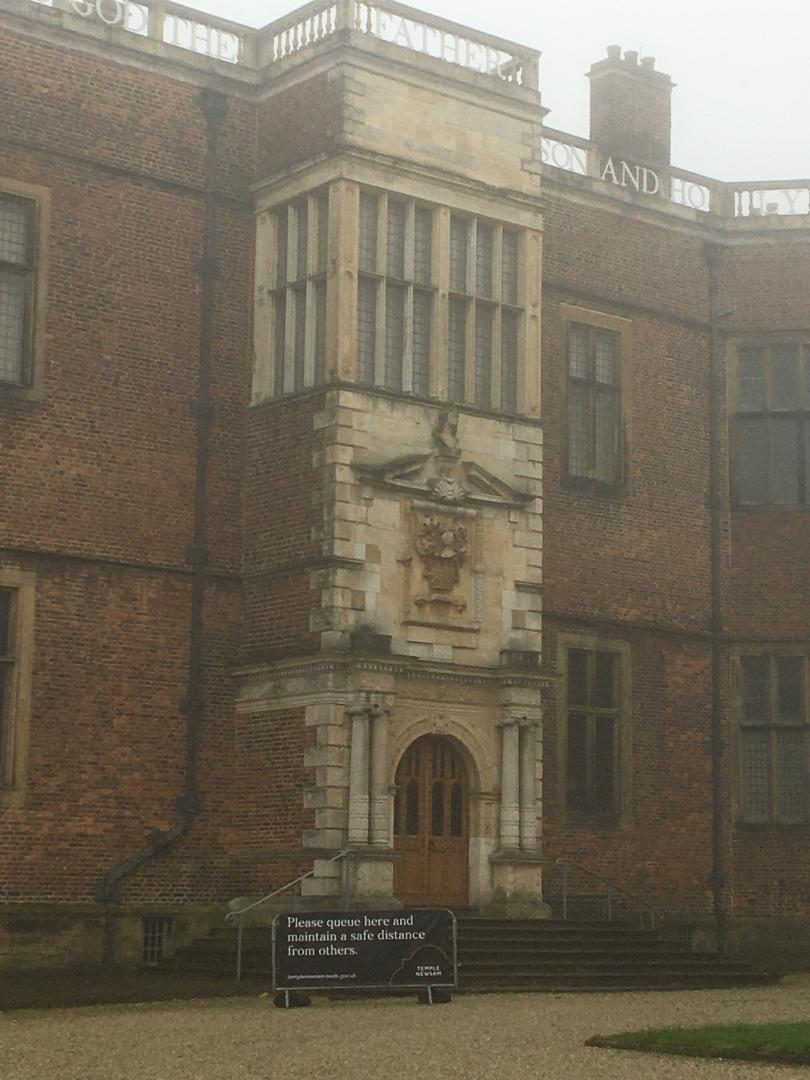
Entrance Porch 17th century

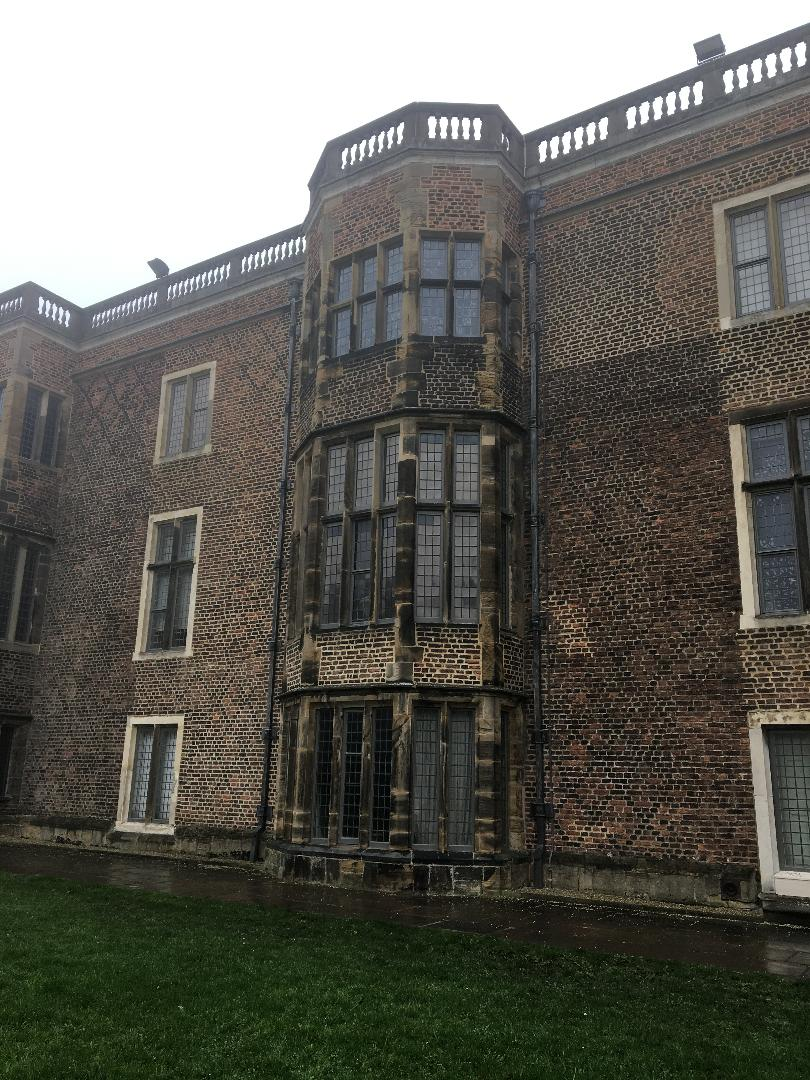
Centre of Temple Newsam west front

Remains of the early 16th century house were retained in the new building, including the brickwork and bay windows in the centre of the west front. The plan of the new house was a conservative E-shape. The Long Gallery and entrance hall in the south wing followed Elizabethan and early Jacobean styles. The entrance porch has Classical columns but they are of Flemish design, rather than following correct Italian design. There are Tudor doorways and timberwork in the cellars, which are largely Tudor in date. Tudor features have also been discovered beneath later layers of decoration, including Lord Darcy's crest scratched into the plaster in the Blue Damask room. An inventory of 1565 indicates that the hall, great chamber (later the dining room), gallery and chapel (later the kitchen) were probably where they are now. There is a Tudor doorway in the north wing which was probably the entrance to the original chapel.

In the 17th century, the south and north wings were rebuilt and the east wing demolished, replaced by a low wall with an arched gateway, giving the house a fashionable 'half-H' appearance. It is possible that the man who made plans for the alteration was Bernard Dinninghof of York. There is also some resemblance to designs by Inigo Jones. Round the top of the house, letters appear in a balustrade, declaring the piety and loyalty of Sir Arthur Ingram: "All Glory And Praise Be Given To God The Father The Son And Holy Ghost On High Peace On Earth Good Will Towards Men Honour And True Allegiance To Our Gracious King Loving Affection Amongst His Subjects Health And Plenty Be Within This House" The chapel in the north wing retains some 17th century features, such as armorial stained glass, probably by Henry Gyles and a carved wooden pulpit by Thomas Ventris, made around 1636, with geometric patterns, pilasters and friezes. The walls had panels of Old Testament figures, painted by John Carleton. An inventory dated 1667 records that the House had 66 rooms and 11 outhouses. An engraving by Kip and Knyff dated 1699 is an accurate representation of the house, showing the varying height of the house and some buildings that were later demolished, including the arched gateway flanked by two small lodges and a detached garden building dating from the mid-1670s.

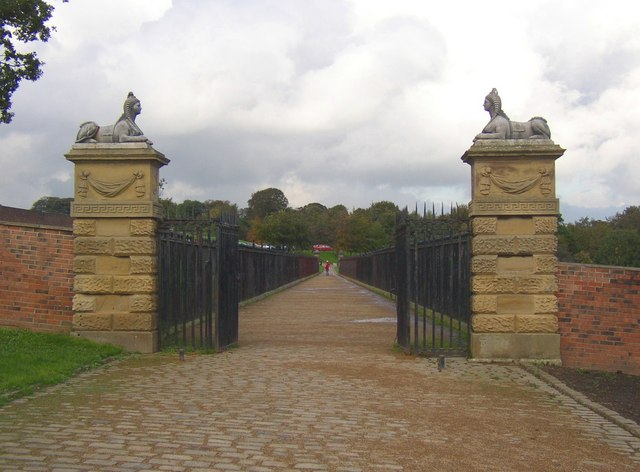
Sphinx gate piers, c. 1760

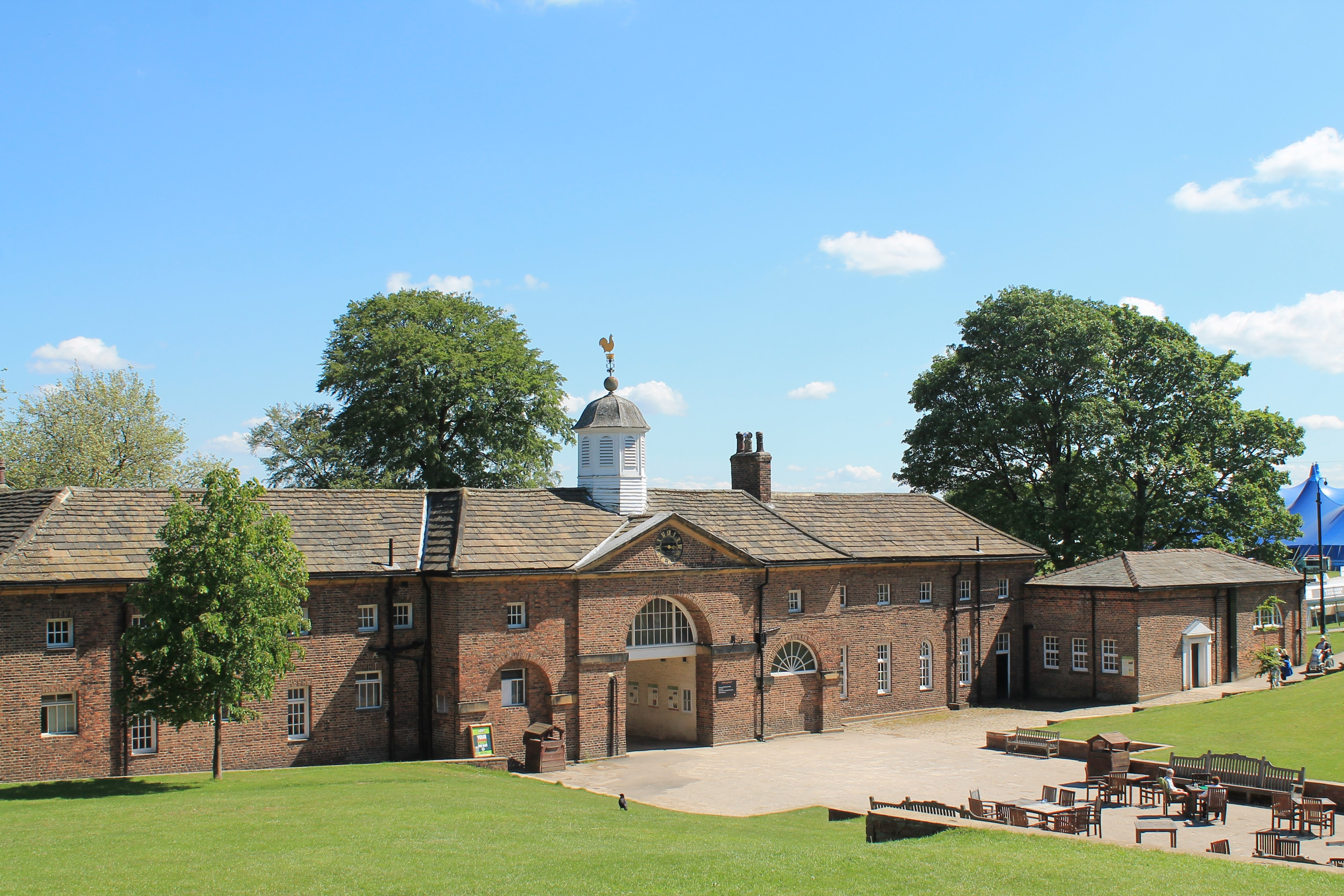
Stable Block at Temple Newsam, added by Henry, 7th Lord Irwin

In 1718, the steward of Temple Newsam suggested an underground service passage to link the north and south wings to the 5th Viscount, who agreed. This tunnel linked the original kitchens in the south wing to the rest of the house. In 1738, Henry, 7th Viscount Irwin wrote to his mother describing the neglected state of the house with windows coming away and cracked brickwork. The house was almost entirely remodelled by Henry. He wanted to follow Palladian design and used craftsmen from York to do so. He widened the gallery, improved the ceiling and windows and created additional rooms. The gallery, completed around 1746, has fine Rococo carvings with overmantle paintings of classical scenes by Antonio Joli. There are also elaborate gilded Rococo ornamental candle holders. The gallery ceiling has detailed stucco work including a medallion of George I. The ceilings in the new Saloon and Library, made from the old Long Gallery, were decorated by Thomas Perritt and Joseph Rose. The doorcases are elaborately carved, probably by Richard Fisher. Two chimney pieces in the Saloon were based on designs by William Kent. The distinctive sphinx gate piers by Lancelot Brown constructed in 1768 were based on designs published by Richard Boyle, 3rd Earl of Burlington in 1738 and used at Chiswick House. The main rooms in the west wing were redecorated and the windows were replaced with sliding sash windows. A large pedimented stable block was built to the north of the house, in 1742 and probably designed by Daniel Garrett, also in the Palladian style. A painting by Mercier of around 1749, also shows a planned block to the south and a low wall connecting the north and south wings which were never completed.

In 1796, Frances Shepheard employed a Mr Johnson to alter and reface the south wing in a style which tried to copy that of Sir Arthur Ingram's original house. Her approach was a departure from the designs for the wing commissioned by her dead husband from John Carr and Robert Adam, as well as the landscaping by Capability Brown who was also consulted about rebuilding the south wing. The wing was made two storeys high throughout with a suite of reception rooms on the ground floor with state bedchambers above. In the 1790s, the kitchens were moved to the north wing and the original kitchen became a brushing room where servants brushed down nobles returning from hunting parties.

At the end of the 19th century, Emily Meynell-Ingram replaced the sash windows with stone mullions and leaded lights and rebuilt the north porch adding the Meynell-Ingram coat of arms over the doorway. She redecorated several rooms and had the great oak staircase installed. The dining room, great staircase and Lord Darnley's room were remodelled in Elizabethan style. In 1877, Emily converted the library at the east end of the gallery into a chapel.

== Coal mining on the estate ==
Estate records show the existence of coal pits in and around the park in the seventeenth century and Bell Wood to the south of the house would have had bell pits for coal extraction. A colliery at Halton village was leased to a number of different individuals from 1660 through to at least the 1790s. The leases generally required the leaseholder to supply coals to Temple Newsam house.

In 1815, William Fenton, one of the 'Coal Kings' of Yorkshire, began the sinking of a mine shaft on the estate at Thorpe Stapleton. The colliery was named Waterloo to commemorate the famous battle of that year. Waterloo Colliery was operated as a royalty concession with contracted 'rents' for coal extracted going to the Temple Newsam landowner. Fenton also had a village built for his workers on land between the River Aire and the Aire and Calder Navigation. The village was initially called Newmarket but then became Irwin Square on ordnance survey maps and Ingram Place on census lists, but it was commonly simply known as Waterloo. The Yorkshire, Lancashire and England cricketer Albert Ward was born here in 1865. The village had two rows of cottages and a school building. It was connected to the colliery by a wooden footbridge over the river. Deep coal mining on the estate ended with the closure of the Temple Pit of Waterloo Main Colliery in 1968.

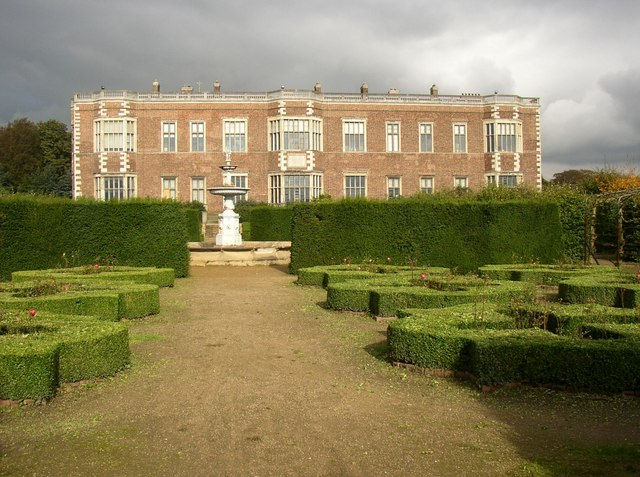
Temple Newsam House

Opencast mining on the estate began in May 1942. Seven sites were exploited to the south of the house almost entirely destroying Capability Brown's landscape. One site reached within 330 feet (100 m) of the South Terrace. It continued at the Gamblethorpe site as far as Dawson's Wood, in full view of the house, until 1987. No trace of the opencast remains now as the parkland was re-landscaped.

In 2019 there was a temporary exhibition about coal mining at Temple Newsam which was called 'Blot on the Landscape'.

== House and estate today ==
The house and estate are owned by Leeds City Council and open to the public. The house has undergone substantial restoration to its exterior. There is an established programme of restoring rooms back to known previous configurations, reversing the numerous intrusive installations and modifications that took place during the building's "art museum" phase.

The wider estate is made up of woods (the second largest part of the Forest of Leeds). There are sporting facilities for football, golf, running, cycling, horse-riding and orienteering. There is an innovative children's playground opened in 2011 which caters for both disabled and able-bodied children. An area designated for learning to cycle was created in 2026.

Pegasus Wood, to the south of the house, commemorates veterans of the Normandy Landing at Pegasus Bridge in 1944.

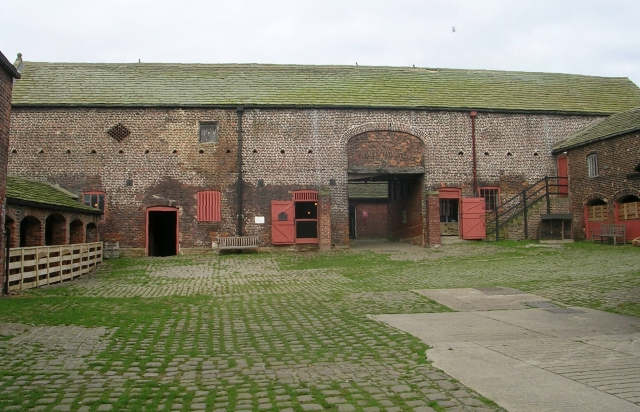
Great Barn, Home Farm, Temple Newsam

The Home Farm, open to the public, has a barn built in 1694 and is the largest working rare breeds farm in Europe, and only one of 16 nationally approved by the Rare Breeds Survival Trust. Breeds include Gloucester, Kerry, Irish Moiled, Red Poll, White Park, British White, Beef Shorthorn, Vaynol and Belted Galloway cattle; Kerry Hill; Whitefaced Woodland and Portland sheep, and Golden Guernsey goats. The farm was targeted by arsonists twice in 2011 with damage caused to buildings, and some animals killed.

There are extensive gardens, with a celebrated rhododendron walk and six National Plant Collections: Aster novi-belgii (Michaelmas daisies), Phlox paniculata, Delphinium elatum (Cultivars), Solenostemon scutellarioides (sys. Coleus blumei), Primula auricula and Chrysanthemum (Charm and Cascade cultivars). Within the Walled Garden there are 800 yards of herbaceous borders.

In 2026 parched areas of grass on an old photograph led to the discovery of a 'lost building' on the estate with foundations of an outbuilding uncovered by members of the South Leeds Archaeology team (SLA).

=== Heritage designations ===
The main house of Temple Newsam is a Grade I listed building. The grounds are designated as Grade II on the Register of Historic Parks and Gardens of Special Historic Interest in England. The neo-classical stable block and the Little Temple are both Grade II* listed. The north lodges and the nearby boundary walls are Grade II listed as are several buildings at Home Farm: the dovecote and laundry, a barn and the farmhouse. Several other structures at Temple Newsam are also Grade II listed, these are the Sphinx Gates, the walled garden, a cast-iron fountain, and a stone bridge.

== Collections ==
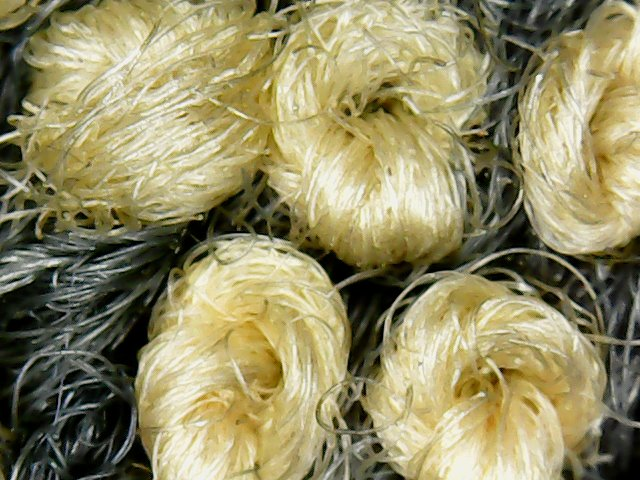
High magnification of French knots used to depict sunflower seeds on the upholstery of the daybed in the Temple Newsam Picture Gallery

There are substantial holdings of fine and decorative art which are designated by the Department of Culture, Media and Sport (DCMS) as being of national significance.

The Picture Gallery, itself an important example of early English rococo style, includes artwork brought back from Europe by Edward 4th Viscount in the first decade of the 18th century, and ranging from paintings of seascapes, landscapes and battle scenes by Antonio Marini, whose portrait is also on display.

The Picture Gallery also houses a fine suite of furniture commissioned from London furniture maker James Pascall. The suite's floral upholstery was made using techniques including petit point needlework and French knots to depict sunflower seeds on the daybed. The Temple Newsam Picture Gallery Suite was the focus of a project in 2021 using microscopic technology to magnify the needlework up to 1,000 times and reveal detail down to individual threads.

Of most significant historical and cultural interest is the Chippendale Society collection of Chippendale works that are on permanent loan. In his book "Britain's Best Museums and Galleries", Mark Fisher (a former Department for Culture, Media and Sport minister) gave the museum an excellent review. When interviewed on Front Row, BBC Radio 4, November 2004 Fisher placed Temple Newsam House in the top three non-national museums in the country, along with Birmingham's Barber Institute and the Dulwich Picture Gallery.

== Events ==
Party in the Park and Opera in the Park were annual ticketed concerts organised by Leeds City Council and Radio Aire, which respectively have accommodated 70,000 and 50,000 spectators. Both were held in July on the site from 1994 to 2014. They took place on the grassed area which slopes down at the front of the house.

An amphitheatre near the stables block is used for occasional open-air theatre performances, and the fields to the north of the Home Farm are used for various events such as steam fairs and dog shows.

In August 1997 and 1998 the estate was the site of the V Festival but, after the success of the event, this was replaced by a new northern leg of the Reading and Leeds Festivals from 1999, taking place the weekend after the regular V festival slot in August. The Leeds Festival however moved to Bramham Park after the 2002 event when the festival was marred by riots and violence in the festival grounds, and trouble in the surrounding estates of east Leeds.

Sven Vath hosted Cocoon in the Park every July with the organisers behind Mint Club and Mint Festival from 2009 to 2019.

In 2019 it became the new home to Slam Dunk Festival as it had grown and moved out of the city centre of Leeds. In 2019, they launched a new festival called Newsam Park.

Many other events take place at Temple Newsam, such as the Leeds Waggy Walk event for Dogs Trust and Race for Life for Cancer Research UK. Since early 2013, there has been a weekly Parkrun event.

In February 2024, Temple Newsam hosted the BUCS Cross Country Championships. Athletes from British Universities and Colleges, competed in four races of distances between 6,560 metres and 9,690 metres across Temple Newsam Park.

== See also ==
- Grade I listed buildings in West Yorkshire
- Listed buildings in Leeds (Temple Newsam Ward)
- Chippendale Society
