= Admiral Brown =

Admiral Brown may refer to:

== Royal Navy ==
- Brian Brown (Royal Navy officer) (1934–2020), British Royal Navy admiral
- David Brown (Royal Navy officer) (1927–2005), British Royal Navy vice admiral
- Francis Clifton Brown (1874–1963), British Royal Navy vice admiral
- Harold Brown (Royal Navy officer) (1878–1968), British Royal Navy vice admiral
- William Brown (Royal Navy officer) (1764–1814), officer (Rear-Admiral) of the British Royal Navy during the Napoleonic Wars

== U.S. Coast Guard ==
- Erroll M. Brown (born 1950), Rear Admiral in the U.S. Coast Guard, and the first African-American promoted to flag rank
- Manson K. Brown (born 1956), U.S. Coast Guard vice admiral
- Peter J. Brown (fl. 2010s–2020s), U.S. Coast Guard rear admiral

== U.S. Navy ==
- Annette E. Brown, Rear Admiral of the U.S. Navy
- Brian B. Brown (born 1964), U.S. Navy vice admiral
- Charles R. Brown (1899–1983), U.S. Navy four-star admiral
- Clarence John Brown (1895–1973), U.S. Navy vice admiral
- F. Taylor Brown (1925–2011), U.S. Navy rear admiral
- George Brown (admiral) (1835–1913), American naval officer
- John H. Brown Jr. (1891–1963), U.S. Navy vice admiral
- Nancy Elizabeth Brown (born 1952), American Vice Admiral serving as the Director, Command, Control, Communications and Computer Systems
- Thomas L. Brown II (born 1960), U.S. Navy rear admiral
- William A. Brown (admiral) (born 1958), U.S. Navy vice admiral
- Wilson Brown (admiral) (1881–1957), World War II naval commander

== Other ==
- William Brown (admiral) (1777–1857), also known in Spanish as Guillermo Brown or Almirante Brown, a hero of Argentina
