= Baron FitzGerald =

Baron FitzGerald may refer to:

- William Vesey-FitzGerald, 2nd Baron FitzGerald and Vesey, and 1st Baron FitzGerald (1783–1843), Irish statesman
- John FitzGerald, Baron FitzGerald (1816–1889), British law lord and life peer

== See also ==
- Baron FitzGerald and Vesey
