= Clifton Brown =

Clifton Brown or Clifton-Brown may refer to:

Full name

- Clifton Brown (kickboxer), (born 1976) Canadian light-heavyweight Muay Thai kickboxer

Surname

- Douglas Clifton Brown, 1st Viscount Ruffside (1879–1958), British Conservative MP and Speaker
- Geoffrey Clifton-Brown (Bury St Edmunds MP) (1899–1983), British Conservative MP
- Geoffrey Clifton-Brown (born 1953), British Conservative MP

== See also ==
Middle name Clifton, surname Brown

- James Clifton Brown (1841–1917), British Liberal politician
- Howard Clifton Brown (1868–1946), British army officer and Conservative MP
- Francis Clifton Brown (1874–1963), British naval officer
