= 1882 Ennis by-election =

Late 19th Century Irish election

The 1882 Ennis by-election took place on 14 November 1882. The by-election, to the UK House of Commons constituency of Ennis, arose due to the resignation of the incumbent MP, James Lysaght Finegan, a supporter of the Home Rule League.

Twenty-one year old Matthew Joseph Kenny, a barrister, was nominated as candidate of the Home Rule League. Robert Carey Reeves, Deputy Lieutenant and a local landlord, was nominated as the Liberal-Conservative candidate. With just 263 registered voters, the turnout was small. Kenny received 136 votes, as against 95 for Carey Reeves, a Home Rule majority of 41.

In the General Election of 1885, Reeves contested the West Clare seat, but failed to be elected.
