= William Rydelere =

William Rydelere may refer to:

- William Rydelere (fl. 1381–1397), MP for Horsham
- William Rydelere (fl. 1393), MP for Horsham
