= Clare Militia =

Irish Militia regiment from 1798 to 1909

Clare Militia Clare Artillery
- Active: 1793–1909
- Country: Ireland (1793–1800); United Kingdom (1801–1909)
- Branch: Militia
- Type: Infantry (1793–1882); Artillery (1882–1909)
- Part of: North Irish Division, Royal Artillery; Southern Division, Royal Artillery
- Garrison/HQ: Ennis
- Engagements: Irish Rebellion of 1798: Battle of New Ross; Battle of Vinegar Hill

The Clare Militia was an Irish Militia regiment from 1798 to 1909. It was based in County Clare (now in the Republic of Ireland). At first an infantry unit, it was converted to artillery in 1882, making it the last artillery militia unit raised in the British forces. It was disbanded in 1909.

== Background ==
Although there are scattered references to town guards in 1584, no organised militia existed in Ireland before 1660. After that date, some militia forces were organised in the reign of King Charles II but it was not until 1715 that the Irish Militia came under statutory authority. During the 18th Century there were various Volunteer Associations and unofficial militia units controlled by the landowners, concerned mainly with internal security. During the War of American Independence, the threat of invasion by the Americans' allies, France and Spain, appeared to be serious. While most of the Regular Army was fighting overseas, the coasts of England and Wales were defended by the embodied Militia, but Ireland had no equivalent force. The Parliament of Ireland passed a Militia Act, but this failed to create an effective force. However it opened the way for the paramilitary Irish Volunteers to fill the gap. The Volunteers were outside the control of either the parliament or the Dublin Castle administration. When the invasion threat receded they diminished in numbers but remained a political force. On the outbreak of the French Revolutionary War In 1793, the Irish administration passed an effective Militia Act that created an official Irish Militia, while the paramilitary volunteers were essentially banned. The new Act was based on existing English precedents, with the men conscripted by ballot to fill county quotas (paid substitutes were permitted) and the officers having to meet certain property qualifications.

== Clare Militia ==
County Clare was given a quota of 356 men to find, to be organised into a battalion of six companies. However, there were anti-ballot riots in the county: two attempts to carry out the ballot at Tulla were met with opposition. Viscount Conyngham, who had been nominated to raise and command the regiment, gathered a force of volunteers and the opposition died away. The regiment was raised at Clarecastle, near the county town of Ennis, its headquarters thereafter remaining at Ennis throughout its existence. Many of the men enlisted were volunteers who were paid a bounty out of an insurance scheme contributed to by those liable to balloting.

=== French Revolutionary War ===
The French Revolutionary and Napoleonic Wars saw the British and Irish militia embodied for a whole generation, becoming regiments of full-time professional soldiers (though restricted to service in Britain or Ireland respectively), which the regular army increasingly saw as a prime source of recruits. They served in coast defences, manned garrisons, guarded prisoners of war, and carried out internal security duties. In Ireland the latter role assumed greater importance, with frequent armed clashes between militia detachments and the self-styled 'Defenders' in the 1790s. By the end of August 1794 the regiment was stationed at Ballyshannon in County Donegal, with one company detached at Manorhamilton in County Leitrim.

Anxiety about a possible French invasion grew during the autumn of 1796 and preparations were made for field operations. A large French expeditionary force appeared in Bantry Bay on 21 December and troops from all over Ireland were marched towards the threatened area. However, the French fleet was scattered by winter storms, several ships being wrecked, and none of the French troops succeeded in landing; there was no sign of a rising by the United Irishmen. The invasion was called off on 29 December, and the troop concentration was dispersed in early 1797.

Early in 1797 the light companies of the militia were detached to join composite battalions drawn from several militia regiments. The Clare contingent was attached to 4th Light Battalion, stationed at Loughlinstown. The militia regiments were each issued with two light six-pounder 'battalion guns', with the gun detachments trained by the Royal Artillery. When the militiamen of 1793 reached the end of their four-year enlistment in 1797, most of the Irish regiments were able to maintain their numbers through re-enlistments (for a bounty). The Clare Militia was augmented in July 1797 and its establishment now totalled 460 all ranks. Conygham appears to have given up the command of the Clare Militia in 1797, because his twin brother the Hon Francis Nathaniel Burton was appointed colonel on 27 October.

=== Irish Rebellion ===
The expected Irish Rebellion finally broke out in May 1798. The Light Company with 4th Light Battalion was present at the battles of New Ross on 5 June, after which Major Vandeleur of the regiment (probably John Ormsby Vandeleur, Member of Parliament for Ennis) was Mentioned in dispatches by Major-General Henry Johnson. The 4th Light Battalion was also present at the Vinegar Hill on 21 June.

The rebellion was effectively ended at Vinegar Hill, and although a small French invasion force landed in August and inflicted a defeat on the government troops at the Battle of Castlebar it was too late to have any real effect, and soon surrendered. By that time the Clare Militia had resumed recruiting heavily. After the rebellion the Irish Militia settled down to garrison duty once more. While stationed at Londonderry the band of the Clare Militia entertained the local people with Sunday concerts.

By the end of 1801 peace negotiations with the French were progressing and recruiting and re-enlistment for the Irish Militia was stopped in October. The men received the new clothing they were due on 25 December, but the Treaty of Amiens was signed in March 1802 and the regiments were disembodied over the next two months, leaving only the permanent staffs of non-commissioned officers (NCOs) and drummers under the regimental adjutant.

=== Napoleonic Wars ===
However, the Peace of Amiens was short-lived and preparations to re-embody the militia begun in November 1802. Early in 1803 the regiments were ordered to begin re-enrolling former militiamen and new volunteers as well as using the ballot. The proclamation to embody the militia was issued on 15 March and carried out on 25 March.

Anti-invasion preparations were now put in hand and the reconstituted militia regiments underwent training, although most were not considered well enough trained to go into camp during the summer of 1804. The light battalions were reformed in September 1803 but were discontinued in 1806. Over the following years the regiments carried out garrison duties at various towns across Ireland, attended summer training camps.They also provided volunteers to transfer to the Regular Army. In 1805 the militia establishment was raised to allow for this.

An 'Interchange Act' was passed in July 1811 permitting British and Irish militia units to volunteer for service across the Irish Sea. By the end of July 34 out of 38 Irish militia regiments had volunteered for this service, including the Clare Militia. The Clare, Louth and Mayo militia regiments boarded transport ships but were unable to leave Dublin Bay for some time because of contrary wind, and then the convoy was driven by a storm into Milford Haven with some damage. Furthermore, contagious fever broke out among the men in the ships, and they were put in quarantine when the first landed. Over the following months the Clare Militia were successively stationed at Ipswich, Woodbridge, Harwich, Horsham, Brighton, Chichester, Haslar and Gosport. The Irish Militia regiments returned home during 1813. The war ended in 1814 with the abdication of Napoleon in April. Militia recruiting was halted and the regiments could be progressively disembodied.

Napoleon escaped from Elba in 1815 and the Irish Militia were called out again on 26 June as the bulk of the regular army crossed to the Continent for the short Waterloo campaign and occupation duties in its aftermath. There were some disturbances in. Ireland during this period, but these had died down by February 1816 and the militia could be gradually reduced. The last regiments had been disembodied by the end of April 1816.

=== Long Peace ===
After Waterloo there was a long peace. Although officers continued to be commissioned into the militia and ballots might still be held, the regiments were rarely assembled for training and the permanent staffs of militia regiments were progressively reduced. Francis Conyngham, Earl of Mount Charles, later 2nd Marquess Conyngham, was appointed Lt-Col of the Clare Militia on 28 December 1825. At the time he was a half-pay captain, having served in several cavalry regiments, and was the Parliamentary Under-Secretary of State for Foreign Affairs.) William Vesey-FitzGerald, 2nd Baron FitzGerald and Vesey, who had been a major in the regiment since 1805 and was Lord Lieutenant of Clare, was promoted to colonel of the regiment in 1832. After FitzGerald's death on 11 May 1843, Crofton Moore Vandeleur (probably the son of the Maj Vandeleur who distinguished himself at New Ross) was appointed colonel in succession on 24 June 1843.

== 1852 Reforms ==
The United Kingdom Militia was revived by the Militia Act 1852, enacted during a period of international tension. As before, units were raised and administered on a county basis, and filled by voluntary enlistment (although conscription by means of the Militia Ballot might be used if the counties failed to meet their quotas). Training was for 56 days on enlistment, then for 21–28 days per year, during which the men received full army pay. Under the Act, Militia units could be embodied by Royal Proclamation for full-time home defence service in three circumstances:

1. 'Whenever a state of war exists between Her Majesty and any foreign power'.
2. 'In all cases of invasion or upon imminent danger thereof'.
3. 'In all cases of rebellion or insurrection'.

=== Crimean War ===
The outbreak of the Crimean War in 1854 and the despatch of an expeditionary force led to the militia being called out for home defence. The Clare Militia was reformed and embodied by early March 1855. It remained at Clarecastle until it moved to the Curragh outside Dublin during the autumn. In December it went to Newport. The war ended with the Treaty of Paris on 30 March, and the militia were stood down at the end of May.

The militia now settled into a routine of annual training (though there was no training for the Irish Militia from 1866 to 1870 at the time of the Fenian crisis). The militia regiments now had a large cadre of permanent staff (about 30) and a number of the officers were former Regulars. Around a third of the recruits and many young officers went on to join the Regular Army. The Militia Reserve introduced in 1867 consisted of present and former militiamen who undertook to serve overseas in case of war.

== Cardwell and Childers Reforms ==
Under the 'Localisation of the Forces' scheme introduced by the Cardwell Reforms of 1872, militia regiments were brigaded with their local linked regular regiments. For the Clare Militia this was in Sub-District No 70 (Counties of Kerry, Cork and Clare) in Cork District of Irish Command:

- 101st Regiment of Foot (Royal Bengal Fusiliers)
- 104th Regiment of Foot (Bengal Fusiliers)
- South Cork Light Infantry
- Clare Militia
- Kerry Militia
- North Cork Rifles
- Royal Limerick County Militia
- No 70 Brigade Depot was formed at Tralee, the Kerry Militia's HQ.

Although often referred to as brigades, the sub-districts were purely administrative organisations, but in a continuation of the Cardwell Reforms a mobilisation scheme began to appear in the Army List from December 1875. This assigned Regular and Militia units to places in an order of battle of corps, divisions and brigades for the 'Active Army', even though these formations were entirely theoretical, with no staff or services assigned. The Clare were assigned to 2nd Brigade of 1st Division, VI Corps. The brigade would have mustered at Conwy in North Wales in time of war.

The Childers Reforms took Cardwell's reforms further, with the militia regiments becoming numbered battalions of their linked regiments. On 1 July 1881 the 101st and 104th Regiments became the 1st and 2nd Battalions of the Royal Munster Fusiliers, and the Clare Militia became the 3rd (Clare Militia) Battalion, Royal Munster Fusiliers. However, in a change of policy, the Clare Militia was instead converted to artillery the following year. It became the 7th Brigade, South Irish Division, Royal Artillery on 1 April 1882. This was the last Militia Artillery unit ever formed by the British Home forces.

== Clare Artillery ==
On 1 July 1889 the South Irish Division of the Royal Artillery was abolished and the unit became the Clare Artillery (Southern Division RA).

Between 19 February and 16 November 1900 the unit was embodied for the Second Boer War. In 1902 it was renamed The Clare Artillery, Royal Garrison Artillery (Militia).

After the Boer War, the future of the Militia was called into question. There were moves to reform all the Auxiliary Forces (Militia, Yeomanry and Volunteers) to take their place in the six Army corps proposed by St John Brodrick as Secretary of State for War. For this, some batteries of Militia Artillery were to be converted to field artillery. However, little of Brodrick's scheme was carried out.

Under the more sweeping Haldane Reforms of 1908, the Militia was replaced by the Special Reserve, a semi-professional force whose role was to provide reinforcement drafts for Regular units serving overseas in wartime. Although the Clare RGA (M) transferred to the Special Reserve Royal Field Artillery on 31 May 1908 (taking the title Clare Royal Field Reserve Artillery), it was disbanded in 1909.

== Commanders ==
=== Colonels ===
Colonels of the Regiment included;

- Henry Conyngham, 1st Marquess Conyngham 1793
- Hon Francis Nathaniel Burton, 27 October 1797
- William Vesey-FitzGerald, 2nd Baron FitzGerald and Vesey, promoted 1832, died 11 May 1843
- Crofton Moore Vandeleur, 24 June 1843, Hon Col 30 April 1873

=== Lieutenant-Colonels ===
Lieutenant-colonels (commandants after 1873) included:

- Augustine FitzGerald, 11 May 1803
- Francis Conyngham, 2nd Marquess Conyngham, 28 December 1825, resigned 1854
- Francis Macnamara, former Captain, 8th Hussars, 4 November 1854
- William E. Armstrong-Macdonnell, promoted 16 November 1871, commandant from 1873
- J. O'Callaghan, former Captain, 62nd Foot, 12 November 1883
- Daniel M. Massy, promoted 1 August 1893
- George O'Callaghan-Westropp, former Captain, Royal Irish Rifles, promoted 3 December 1898

=== Honorary colonels ===
The following served as Honorary Colonel of the unit:

- Crofton Moore Vandeleur, appointed 30 April 1873, died 8 November 1881
- Edward O'Brien, 14th Baron Inchiquin, appointed 26 April 1882, died 9 April 1900
- Lucius O'Brien, 15th Baron Inchiquin, appointed 17 October 1900

NCO's

Sergeant Major

James Morgan appointed 1905 until disbanded 1909. Clare Militia, Clare Militia Barracks, Ennis County Clare, Ireland

== Heritage & ceremonial ==
=== Uniform ===
The uniform of the Clare Militia was a red coat with yellow facings.

On conversion to artillery the corps adopted the blue uniform and red facings of the Royal Artillery. The officers wore the standard South Irish Division helmet plate and embroidered pouch, each with 'CLARE ARTILLERY' on the lower scroll. In 1907 the other ranks bore the brass titles 'RGA' over 'CLARE' on the shoulder straps of the khaki service dress.

=== Precedence ===
On the outbreak of the French Revolutionary War the English counties had drawn lots to determine the relative precedence of their militia regiments. In 1798 the new Irish militia regiments received their own table of precedence, in which County Wicklow came 26th. In 1833 King William IV drew the lots to determine an order of precedence for the whole of the United Kingdom. Those regiments raised before 1783 took the first 69 places, followed by the 60 regiments (including those in Ireland) raised for the French Revolutionary War: the Wicklow Militia took 94th place, and this remained unchanged when the list was updated in 1855. When the regiment converted to artillery in 1882, the unit was put at the end of the artillery militia list, at 37th. Most regiments took little notice of the numeral.

== See also ==
- Irish Militia
- Militia (United Kingdom)
- South Irish Division, Royal Artillery
- Militia Artillery units of the United Kingdom and Colonies

== Notes ==
- W. Y. Baldry, 'Order of Precedence of Militia Regiments', Journal of the Society for Army Historical Research, Vol 15, No 57 (Spring 1936), pp. 5–16. JSTOR 44227944.
- Beckett, Ian F. W. (2011). Britain's Part Time Soldiers. The Amateur Military Tradition 1558—1945 (2 ed.). Barnsley: Pen & Sword. ISBN 978-1-84884-395-0.
- Burke's Peerage, Baronetage and Knightage, 100th Edn, London, 1953.
- Col John K. Dunlop, The Development of the British Army 1899–1914, London: Methuen, 1938.
- J. B. M. Frederick, Lineage Book of British Land Forces 1660–1978, Vol I, Wakefield: Microform Academic, 1984, ISBN 1-85117-007-3.
- J. B. M. Frederick, Lineage Book of British Land Forces 1660–1978, Vol II, Wakefield: Microform Academic, 1984, ISBN 1-85117-009-X.
- Lt-Col James Moncrieff Grierson (Col Peter S. Walton, ed.), Scarlet into Khaki: The British Army on the Eve of the Boer War, London: Sampson Low, 1899/London: Greenhill, 1988, ISBN 0-947898-81-6.
- Lt-Col H. G. Hart, The New Annual Army List, and Militia List (various dates from 1840).
- Col George Jackson Hay, An Epitomized History of the Militia (The Constitutional Force), London: United Service Gazette, 1905/Ray Westlake Military Books, 1987, ISBN 0-9508530-7-0/Uckfield: Naval & Military Press, 2015 ISBN 978-1-78331-171-2.
- Roger Knight, Britain Against Napoleon: The Organization of Victory 1793–1815, London: Allen Lane, 2013/Penguin, 2014, ISBN 978-0-14-103894-0.
- Norman E. H. Litchfield, The Militia Artillery 1852–1909 (Their Lineage, Uniforms and Badges), Nottingham: Sherwood Press, 1987, ISBN 0-9508205-1-2.
- Ernest J. Martin, 'Order of Precedence of Irish Militia Regiments, 1798', Journal of the Society for Army Historical Research, Vol 34, No 138 (June 1956), p. 86. JSTOR 44226698.
- Sir Henry McAnally, The Irish Militia 1793–1816: A Social and Military Study, Dublin: Clonmore & Reynolds/London: Eyre & Spottiswoode, 1949.
- Henry Alexander Richey, A Short History of the Royal Longford Militia, 1793–1893, Dublin: Hodges, Figgis, 1894.
- Arthur Sleigh, The Royal Militia and Yeomanry Cavalry Army List, April 1850, London: British Army Despatch Press, 1850/Uckfield: Naval and Military Press, 1991, ISBN 978-1-84342-410-9.
- Edward M. Spiers, The Army and Society 1815–1914, London: Longmans, 1980, ISBN 0-582-48565-7.
- War Office, A List of the Officers of the Militia, the Gentlemen & Yeomanry Cavalry, and Volunteer Infantry of the United Kingdom, 11th Ed., London: War Office, 14 October 1805/Uckfield: Naval and Military Press, 2005, ISBN 978-1-84574-207-2.

== External sources ==
- History of Parliament Online
