= Boteler =

Boteler is a surname. Notable people with the surname include:

- Alexander Boteler (1815–1892), 19th-century American politician and clerk from Virginia
- Arnold le Boteler, late-11th- and early-12th-century Norman squire with a penchant for property development
- Henry Boteler (disambiguation)
- John Boteler, 1st Baron Boteler of Brantfield (1565–1647), English politician, MP from 1625 to 1626
- John Boteler Parker (1786–1851), British Army general
- Joseph C. Boteler III, American politician elected in 2002 to represent District 8 of the Maryland House of Delegates in Baltimore County
- Philip Boteler (disambiguation)
- Ralph Boteler, 1st Baron Sudeley (1394–1473), Captain of Calais and Treasurer of England (from 7 July 1443)
- Samuel Boteler Bristowe QC (1822–1897), English barrister and Liberal Party politician from Nottinghamshire
- Wade Boteler (1888–1943), American film actor
- William Boteler (fl. 1640s and 1650s), Roundhead and one of the major-generals during the Rule of the Major Generals
- William Boteler (disambiguation)

== See also ==
- Baron Boteler (sometimes modernly Baron Butler or Baron Botiler), a title that has been created three times in the Peerage of England
- Boteler baronets created for persons with the surname Boteler, all in the Baronetage of England
- Sir Thomas Boteler Church of England High School, comprehensive school in Warrington
