= Horsham (constituency) =

UK Parliament constituency (since 1983)

Coordinates: 51.04°N 0.33°W

- County constituency for the House of Commons
- Interactive map of boundaries since 2024
- Boundary within South East England
- County: West Sussex
- Electorate: 76,981 (2023)
- Major settlements: Billingshurst; Faygate; Horsham; Warnham

Current constituency
- Created: 1983
- Member of Parliament: John Milne (Liberal Democrats)
- Seats: One

1945–1974
- Seats: One
- Type of constituency: County constituency
- Created from: Horsham and Worthing
- Replaced by: Horsham and Crawley

1885–1918
- Seats: One
- Type of constituency: County constituency
- Created from: Horsham, Midhurst and West Sussex
- Replaced by: Horsham and Worthing

1295–1885
- Seats: Until 1832: Two; Until 1885: One
- Type of constituency: Borough constituency
- Replaced by: Horsham

Horsham (/ˈhɔːrʃəm/) is a constituency (Note: A county constituency (for the purposes of election expenses and type of returning officer)) represented in the House of Commons of the UK Parliament, (Note: As with all constituencies, the constituency elects one Member of Parliament (MP) by the first past the post system.) centred on the eponymous town in West Sussex. The seat was won in 2024 by John Milne of the Liberal Democrats, making it the first time since 1876 that a non-Conservative Party candidate has held the seat.

== Constituency profile ==
The Horsham constituency is located in West Sussex and covers most of Horsham District. It is centred on the historic market town of Horsham, which has a population of around 52,000, and covers a large rural area surrounding the town. This area includes the large villages of Billingshurst and Southwater. The Arun Valley railway line travels through Horsham and Billingshurst and connects them to the south coast, Crawley, Gatwick Airport and London, making the area home to many commuters. The constituency is generally affluent with low levels of deprivation, particularly in Southwater and its surroundings, which fall within the top 10% least-deprived areas of England. House prices in the constituency are higher than regional and national averages.

In general, residents of the constituency have high levels of education and income. A high proportion of residents work in retail and in professional or scientific occupations. White people made up 92% of the population at the 2021 census. Most of the constituency, including the town of Horsham, is represented by Liberal Democrats at the local council level. Some Conservatives were elected in the rural areas. An estimated 51% of voters in the constituency supported remaining in the European Union in the 2016 referendum, marginally higher than the nationwide figure of 48%.

== History ==
Horsham has existed as a constituency for three distinct periods. It first sent members to Parliament in 1295. However, the constituency was abolished in 1918 to make way for Horsham and Worthing. In 1945 the constituency was recreated, until 1974 when Horsham and Crawley was created. In 1983 the constituency of Horsham was again created and has existed since.

Until the 1885, the seat was constituted as a Parliamentary Borough, sending two MPs (burgesses) to the House of Commons up to 1832, when its representation was reduced to one member by the Reform Act 1832. Under the Redistribution of Seats Act 1885, the parliamentary borough was abolished, but the name of Horsham was retained as a division of the parliamentary county of Sussex, covering northern areas of what is now West Sussex. Further to the Representation of the People Act 1918, the seat was abolished and largely absorbed into the new constituency of Horsham and Worthing, which also incorporated the coastal towns of Worthing, Shoreham-by-Sea and Southwick – previously part of the Lewes division of Sussex.

By the 1940s, the Horsham and Worthing seat had an electorate of over 100,000 and, for the 1945 general election, the seat was divided in two with the re-establishment of Horsham and the creation of a separate constituency of Worthing. For the following election in 1950, Horsham lost Shoreham and Southwick to the new seat of Arundel and Shoreham. Under the Second Periodic Review of Westminster constituencies which came into effect for the February 1974 election, the seat was renamed Horsham and Crawley to reflect the growing proportion of the electorate coming from the new town of Crawley.

Under the Third Periodic Review, the Boundary Commission decided Crawley now justified a constituency in its own right and Horsham was again re-created as a constituency for the 1983 general election.

=== Political history ===
The constituency (including the two versions under other names) was held by members of the Conservative Party from 1880 to 2024, when it was taken by the Liberal Democrats at the 4th July general election. Edward Turnour held the seat for 47 years from a 1904 byelection until the 1951 general election, which included the whole period of Horsham and Worthing's existence. Similarly, Peter Hordern held the seat for 33 years from 1964 to 1997, including the whole period of Horsham and Crawley's existence.

Its Member of Parliament (MP) was Francis Maude between 1997 and 2015; followed by fellow Conservative Jeremy Quin until 2024 when the seat was taken from Quin by John Milne of the Liberal Democrats, making it the first time since 1876 that a non-Conservative Party candidate has won the seat. The Liberal Democrats (or one of its predecessors, the Social Democratic Party) had come second to the Conservatives at every general election from 1983 to 2019, except 2015 (UKIP) and 2017 (Labour).

== Boundaries ==
=== Historic ===
1885–1918: The Sessional Divisions of Horsham, Midhurst, Petworth, the civil parish of Crawley.

1945–1950: The Urban Districts of Horsham, Shoreham-by-Sea, Southwick, the Rural Districts of Chanctonbury and Horsham.

1950–1974: The Urban District of Horsham, the Rural Districts of Horsham, Midhurst, Petworth.

1983–1997: The District of Horsham.

1997–2010: The District of Horsham wards of Billingshurst, Broadbridge Heath, Cowfold, Denne, Forest, Holbrook, Itchingfield and Shipley, Nuthurst, Riverside, Roffey North, Rudgwick, Rusper, Slinfold, Southwater, Trafalgar, Warnham, the District of Mid Sussex wards of Balcombe, Copthorne and Worth, Crawley Down, Slaugham, Turners Hill, the District of Chichester wards of Plaistow and Wisborough Green.

Map of boundaries 2010–2024

2010–2024: The District of Horsham wards of Billingshurst and Shipley, Broadbridge Heath, Denne, Forest, Holbrook East, Holbrook West, Horsham Park, Itchingfield, Slinfold and Warnham, Nuthurst, Roffey North, Roffey South, Rudgwick, Rusper and Colgate, Southwater, and Trafalgar, and the District of Mid Sussex wards of Ardingly and Balcombe, Copthorne and Worth, and Crawley Down and Turners Hill.

2024–present: The District of Horsham wards of Billingshurst, Broadbridge Heath, Colgate & Rusper, Cowfold, Shermanbury & West Grinstead, Denne, Forest, Holbrook East, Holbrook West, Itchingfield, Slinfold & Warnham, Nuthurst & Lower Beeding, Roffey North, Roffey South, Rudgwick, Southwater North, Southwater South & Shipley, and Trafalgar.

Electorate reduced to bring it within the permitted range by transferring rural wards to the east and south of Crawley to the newly created constituency of East Grinstead and Uckfield. The Cowfold, Shermanbury & West Grinstead ward was added from Arundel and South Downs.

== Members of Parliament ==
=== MPs before 1660 ===
| Parliament | First member | Second member |
|---|---|---|
| 1386 | Henry Boteler | (?William Rydelere I) |
| 1388 (Feb) | Roger Wyldegose | William Rydelere I |
| 1388 (Sep) | John Baker | Thomas Jewdry |
| 1390 (Jan) | Henry Boteler | |
1390 (Nov)
| 1391 | Henry Boteler | Thomas Jewdry |
| 1393 | William Chode | William Rydelere II |
1394
| 1395 | Henry Boteler | Roger Eylove |
| 1397 (Jan) | William Rydelere I | Roger Wyldegose |
| 1397 (Sep) | Henry Boteler | Richard Coudene |
| 1399 | William Chode | Richard Coudene |
1401
| 1402 | Thomas Bolter | Robert atte Lynde |
1404 (Jan)
1404 (Oct)
| 1406 | Thomas Chode | John Stoute |
| 1407 | Thomas Bolter | Thomas Chode |
1410
1411
1413 (Feb)
| 1413 (May) | Henry Boteler II | Thomas Pylfold |
1414 (Apr)
| 1414 (Nov) | Thomas Chode | Thomas Wodehach |
1415
| 1416 (Mar) | Henry Boteler II | Walter Urry |
1416 (Oct)
| 1417 | John Haselhurst | William Hynekere |
| 1419 | William Stoute | Walter Ury |
| 1420 | William Hynekere | William Stoute |
| 1421 (May) | Thomas Chode | Peter Hent |
| 1421 (Dec) | Henry Boteler II | Roger Elyot |
| 1510–1523 | No names known | |
| 1529 | Alfred Berwick | Henry Hussey |
| 1536 | ? | |
| 1539 | ? | |
| 1542 | ? | |
| 1545 | Sir Anthony Wingfield | Francis Knollys |
| 1547 | Andrew Baynton | John Vaughan |
| 1553 (Mar) | Henry Hussey | Edward Lewknor |
| 1553 (Oct) | Anthony Hussey | John Michell |
| 1554 (Apr) | Richard Baker | John Baker |
| 1554 (Nov) | William Tooke | John Purvey |
| 1555 | Robert Colshill | William Hogan |
| 1558 | John Blennerhassett | Richard Fulmerston |
| 1558 (Dec) | Richard Lestrange | Nicholas Mynn |
| 1562/3 | Peter Osborne | Robert Buxton |
| 1571 | John Hussey | John Gresham |
| 1572 | Nicholas Hare | John Hare |
| 1584 | Nicholas Hare | John Hare |
| 1586 | Nicholas Hare | John Hare |
| 1588/9 | Nicholas Hare | John Hare |
| 1593 | John Hare | Richard Franke |
| 1597 | John Hare | James Booth |
| 1601 | Sir William Hervey | Michael Hicks |
| 1604 | John Dodderidge | Michael Hicks |
| 1614 | John Middleton | Sir Thomas Vavasour |
| 1621 | Thomas Cornwallis | John Middleton |
| 1624 | John Borough | John Middleton |
| 1625 | John Borough | John Middleton |
| 1626 | John Borough | John Middleton |
| 1628 | Dudley North | John Middleton |
| 1629–1640 | No Parliaments summoned | |

=== MPs 1660–1832 ===
| Year | First member | First Party | Second member | Second Party |
|---|---|---|---|---|
| 1660 | Thomas Middleton | | Hall Ravenscroft | |
| 1661 | Sir John Covert, Bt | | Henry Chowne | |
| 1669 | Sir John Covert, Bt | | Orlando Bridgeman | |
| 1679 | Anthony Eversfield | | John Michell | |
| 1681 | John Machell | | John Michell | |
| 1685 | John Machell | | Anthony Eversfield | |
| 1690 | John Machell | | Thomas White | |
| 1695 | John Machell | | Henry Yates | |
| January 1701 | Henry Cowper | | Henry Yates | |
| November 1701 | John Wicker | | Henry Yates | |
| 1702 | John Wicker | | Henry Cowper | |
| 1705 | Charles Eversfield | | Henry Cowper | |
| 1707 | Charles Eversfield | | Henry Goring | |
| 1708 | Charles Eversfield | | John Wicker | |
| 1710 | John Middleton | | John Wicker | |
| 1713 | John Middleton | | Charles Eversfield | |
| January 1715 | Sir Henry Goring, Bt | | Charles Eversfield | |
| June 1715 | Hon. Arthur Ingram | | Arthur Ingram | |
| 1721 | Charles Eversfield | | Arthur Ingram | |
| 1722 | Charles Eversfield | | Hon. Henry Ingram | |
| 1737 | Charles Eversfield | | Hon. Charles Ingram | |
| 1741 | Sir Richard Mill, Bt | | Hon. Charles Ingram | |
| 1747 | Charles Ingram | | Hon. Charles Ingram | |
| 1748 | Charles Ingram | | Sir Lionel Pilkington, Bt | |
| 1763 | Robert Pratt | | Sir Lionel Pilkington, Bt | |
| 1768 | Robert Pratt | | James Grenville | |
| 1770 | Robert Pratt | | James Wallace | Tory |
| 1774 | Jeremiah Dyson | Tory | James Wallace | Tory |
| 1776 | Charles Moore | Tory | James Wallace | Tory |
| September 1780 | George Legg | Tory | James Wallace | Tory |
| November 1780 | Sir George Osborn, Bt | Tory | James Wallace | Tory |
| 1783 | Sir George Osborn, Bt | Tory | James Craufurd | |
| 1784 | Jeremiah Crutchley | | Philip Metcalfe | |
| 1790 | Timothy Shelley | Whig | Wilson Braddyll | |
| 1792 | Lord William Gordon | | James Baillie | |
| 1793 | Lord William Gordon | | William Fullarton | |
| 1796 | Sir John MacPherson | | James Fox-Lane | |
| 1802 | Edward Hilliard | | Patrick Ross | |
| 1804 | Edward Hilliard | | James Harris | Tory |
| 1806 | Francis John Wilder | Whig | Love Jones-Parry | Whig |
| 1807 | Sir Samuel Romilly | Whig | Love Jones-Parry | Whig |
| 1808 | Joseph Marryat | Tory | Henry Goulburn | Tory |
| 1812 | Arthur Piggott | Whig | Robert Hurst | Whig |
| 1818 | George Phillips | Whig | Robert Hurst | Whig |
| 1820 | Sir John Aubrey, Bt | Whig | Robert Hurst | Whig |
| 1826 | Henry Fox | Whig | Robert Hurst | Whig |
| 1827 | Nicholas Ridley-Colborne | Whig | Robert Hurst | Whig |
| 1829 | Nicholas Ridley-Colborne | Whig | The Earl of Arundel | Whig |

- Representation reduced to one (1832)

=== MPs 1832–1918 ===
| Election | Member | Party |
|---|---|---|
| 1832 | Robert Henry Hurst | Radical |
| 1841 | Robert Scarlett | Conservative |
| 1844 by-election | Robert Henry Hurst | Radical |
| 1847 | John Jervis | Radical |
| 1848 by-election | William Vesey-FitzGerald | Conservative |
| 1848 by-election | Lord Edward Howard | Whig |
| 1852 | William Vesey-FitzGerald | Conservative |
| 1865 | Robert Henry Hurst | Liberal |
| 1868 | John Aldridge | Conservative |
| 1868 | Robert Henry Hurst | Liberal |
| 1874 | Sir William Vesey-FitzGerald | Conservative |
| 1875 by-election | Robert Henry Hurst | Liberal |
| 1876 by-election | James Clifton Brown | Liberal |
| 1880 | Sir Henry Aubrey-Fletcher, Bt | Conservative |
| 1885 | Sir Walter Barttelot, Bt | Conservative |
| 1893 by-election | John Heywood Johnstone | Conservative |
| 1904 by-election | Edward Turnour | Conservative |
| 1918 | Constituency abolished: see Horsham and Worthing | |

=== MPs 1945–1974 ===
| Election | Member | Party |
|---|---|---|
| 1945 | Edward Turnour | Conservative |
| 1951 | Frederick Gough | Conservative |
| 1964 | Sir Peter Hordern | Conservative |
| Feb 1974 | constituency abolished: see Horsham and Crawley | |

=== MPs since 1983 ===
| Election | Member | Party |
|---|---|---|
| 1983 | Sir Peter Hordern | Conservative |
| 1997 | Francis Maude | Conservative |
| 2015 | Sir Jeremy Quin | Conservative |
| 2024 | John Milne | Liberal Democrats |

== Elections ==
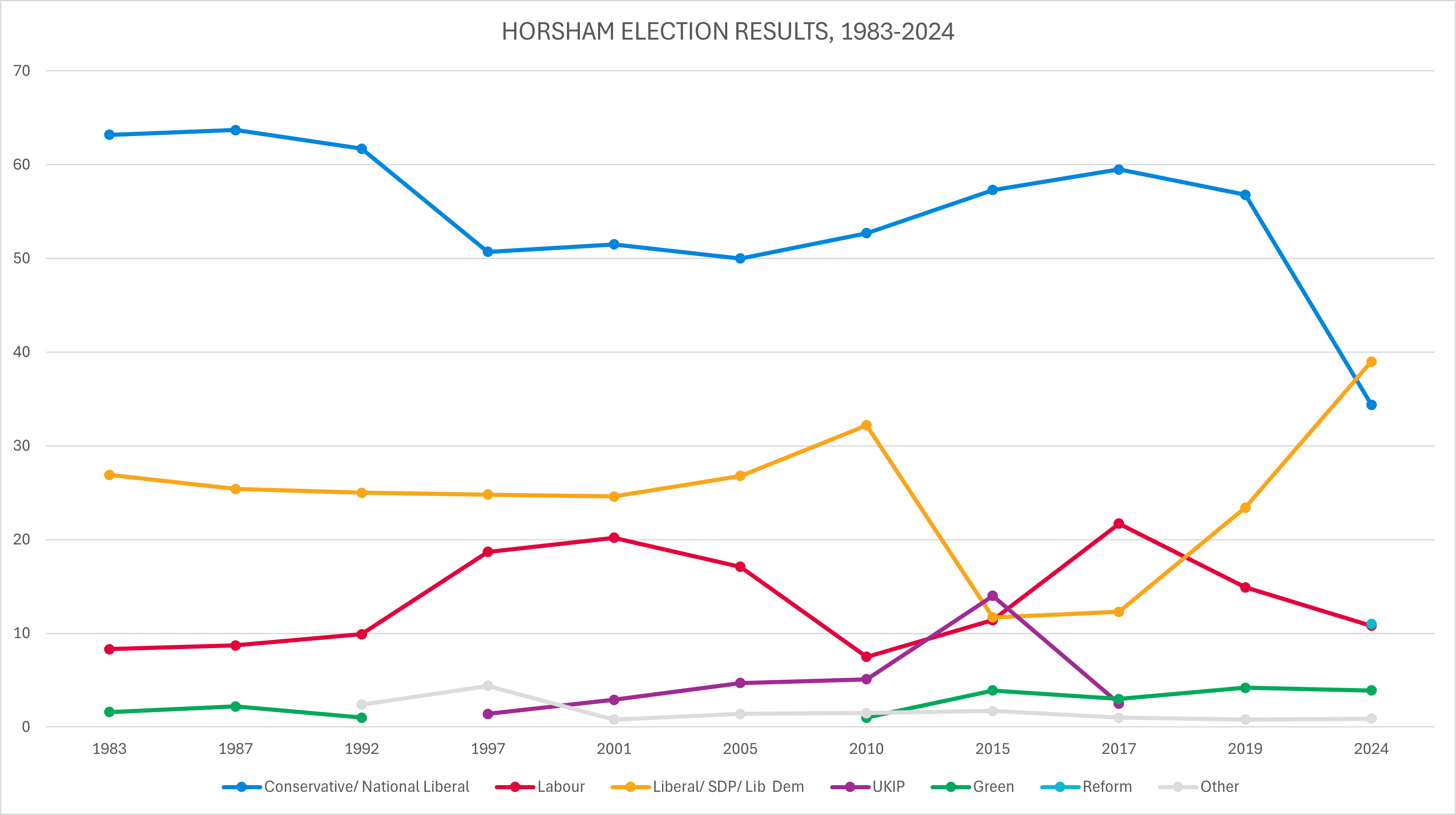
Election results 1983-2024

=== Elections in the 2020s ===
General election 2024: Horsham
| Party | Candidate | Votes | % | ±% |
|---|---|---|---|---|
| Liberal Democrats | John Milne | 21,632 | 39.0 | +14.3 |
| Conservative | Jeremy Quin | 19,115 | 34.4 | −21.4 |
| Reform UK | Hugo Miller (Note: Reform UK withdrew their support for Miller on 7 June 2024, after nominations closed the same day, so he still appeared as the Reform UK candidate on the ballot paper.) | 6,116 | 11.0 | New |
| Labour | James Field | 5,979 | 10.8 | −4.8 |
| Green | Catherine Ross | 2,137 | 3.9 | +0.9 |
| Peace | Jim Duggan | 276 | 0.5 | −0.4 |
| SDP | Paul Abbott | 244 | 0.4 | New |
| Majority | | 2,517 | 4.6 | N/A |
| Turnout | | 55,499 | 70.1 | −2.5 |
| Registered electors | | 79,150 | | |
| Liberal Democrats gain from Conservative | | Swing | +19.0 | |

=== Elections in the 2010s ===
2019 notional result
| Party | Vote | % |
|---|---|---|
| Conservative | 31,155 | 55.8 |
| Liberal Democrats | 13,802 | 24.7 |
| Labour | 8,736 | 15.6 |
| Green | 1,680 | 3.0 |
| Others | 477 | 0.9 |
| Turnout | 55,850 | 72.6 |
| Electorate | 76,981 | |

General election 2019: Horsham
| Party | Candidate | Votes | % | ±% |
|---|---|---|---|---|
| Conservative | Jeremy Quin | 35,900 | 56.8 | −2.7 |
| Liberal Democrats | Louise Potter | 14,773 | 23.4 | +11.1 |
| Labour | Michael Jones | 9,424 | 14.9 | −6.8 |
| Green | Catherine Ross | 2,668 | 4.2 | +1.2 |
| Peace | Jim Duggan | 477 | 0.8 | +0.4 |
| Majority | | 21,127 | 33.4 | −4.4 |
| Turnout | | 63,202 | 72.9 | −2.0 |
| Conservative hold | | Swing | −6.9 | |

General election 2017: Horsham
| Party | Candidate | Votes | % | ±% |
|---|---|---|---|---|
| Conservative | Jeremy Quin | 36,906 | 59.5 | +2.2 |
| Labour | Susannah Brady | 13,422 | 21.7 | +10.3 |
| Liberal Democrats | Morwen Millson | 7,644 | 12.3 | +0.6 |
| Green | Catherine Ross | 1,844 | 3.0 | −0.9 |
| UKIP | Roger Arthur | 1,533 | 2.5 | −11.5 |
| Something New | James Smith | 375 | 0.6 | −0.1 |
| Peace | Jim Duggan | 263 | 0.4 | −0.1 |
| Majority | | 23,484 | 37.8 | −5.5 |
| Turnout | | 61,987 | 74.9 | +2.1 |
| Conservative hold | | Swing | −4.05 | |

General election 2015: Horsham
| Party | Candidate | Votes | % | ±% |
|---|---|---|---|---|
| Conservative | Jeremy Quin | 32,627 | 57.3 | +4.6 |
| UKIP | Roger Arthur | 7,969 | 14.0 | +8.9 |
| Liberal Democrats | Morwen Millson | 6,647 | 11.7 | −20.5 |
| Labour | Martyn Davis | 6,499 | 11.4 | +3.9 |
| Green | Darrin Green | 2,198 | 3.9 | +2.9 |
| Something New | James Smith | 375 | 0.7 | New |
| Peace | Jim Duggan | 307 | 0.5 | 0.0 |
| Independent | Jim Rae | 303 | 0.5 | New |
| Majority | | 24,658 | 43.3 | +22.8 |
| Turnout | | 56,925 | 72.8 | +0.7 |
| Conservative hold | | Swing | −2.15 | |

General election 2010: Horsham
| Party | Candidate | Votes | % | ±% |
|---|---|---|---|---|
| Conservative | Francis Maude | 29,447 | 52.7 | +2.7 |
| Liberal Democrats | Godfrey Newman | 17,987 | 32.2 | +5.4 |
| Labour | Andrew Skudder | 4,189 | 7.5 | −9.6 |
| UKIP | Harry Aldridge | 2,839 | 5.1 | +0.4 |
| Green | Nick Fitter | 570 | 1.0 | New |
| Christian | Steve Lyon | 469 | 0.8 | New |
| Peace | Jim Duggan | 253 | 0.5 | New |
| Independent | Derek Kissach | 87 | 0.2 | New |
| Majority | | 11,460 | 20.5 | −2.7 |
| Turnout | | 55,841 | 72.1 | +4.0 |
| Conservative hold | | Swing | | |

=== Elections in the 2000s ===
General election 2005: Horsham
| Party | Candidate | Votes | % | ±% |
|---|---|---|---|---|
| Conservative | Francis Maude | 27,240 | 50.0 | −1.5 |
| Liberal Democrats | Rosie Sharpley | 14,613 | 26.8 | +2.2 |
| Labour | Rehman Chishti | 9,320 | 17.1 | −3.1 |
| UKIP | Hugo Miller | 2,552 | 4.7 | +1.8 |
| Independent | Jim Duggan | 416 | 0.8 | 0.0 |
| People of Horsham First Party | Martin Jeremiah | 354 | 0.6 | New |
| Majority | | 12,627 | 23.2 | −3.7 |
| Turnout | | 54,495 | 68.1 | +4.3 |
| Conservative hold | | Swing | −1.9 | |

General election 2001: Horsham
| Party | Candidate | Votes | % | ±% |
|---|---|---|---|---|
| Conservative | Francis Maude | 26,134 | 51.5 | +0.8 |
| Liberal Democrats | Hubert Carr | 12,468 | 24.6 | −0.2 |
| Labour | Janet Sully | 10,267 | 20.2 | +1.5 |
| UKIP | Hugo Miller | 1,472 | 2.9 | +1.5 |
| Independent | Jim Duggan | 429 | 0.8 | New |
| Majority | | 13,666 | 26.9 | +1.0 |
| Turnout | | 50,770 | 63.8 | −11.5 |
| Conservative hold | | Swing | +0.5 | |

=== Elections in the 1990s ===
General election 1997: Horsham
| Party | Candidate | Votes | % | ±% |
|---|---|---|---|---|
| Conservative | Francis Maude | 29,015 | 50.7 | −11.5 |
| Liberal Democrats | Morwen Millson | 14,153 | 24.8 | +2.0 |
| Labour | Maureen Walsh | 10,691 | 18.7 | +6.8 |
| Referendum | Robin Grant | 2,281 | 4.0 | New |
| UKIP | Hugo Miller | 819 | 1.4 | New |
| Independent | Malcolm Courbould | 206 | 0.4 | New |
| Majority | | 14,862 | 25.9 | −10.8 |
| Turnout | | 57,165 | 75.3 | −6.0 |
| Conservative hold | | Swing | −6.8 | |

This constituency underwent boundary changes between the 1992 and 1997 general elections and thus change in share of vote is based on a notional calculation.

General election 1992: Horsham
| Party | Candidate | Votes | % | ±% |
|---|---|---|---|---|
| Conservative | Peter Hordern | 42,210 | 61.7 | −2.0 |
| Liberal Democrats | Julie Stainton | 17,138 | 25.0 | −0.4 |
| Labour | Stephen PP Uwins | 6,745 | 9.9 | +1.2 |
| Liberal | Judith A. Elliot | 1,281 | 1.9 | New |
| Green | Trevor J. King | 692 | 1.0 | −1.2 |
| Independent | Jim Duggan | 332 | 0.5 | New |
| Majority | | 25,072 | 36.7 | −1.6 |
| Turnout | | 68,398 | 81.3 | +8.8 |
| Conservative hold | | Swing | −0.8 | |

=== Elections in the 1980s ===
General election 1987: Horsham
| Party | Candidate | Votes | % | ±% |
|---|---|---|---|---|
| Conservative | Peter Hordern | 39,775 | 63.7 | +0.5 |
| Alliance (SDP) | Jennifer Pearce | 15,868 | 25.4 | −1.5 |
| Labour | Michael Shrimpton | 5,435 | 8.7 | +0.4 |
| Green | Terence Metheringham | 1,383 | 2.2 | +0.6 |
| Majority | | 23,907 | 38.3 | +2.0 |
| Turnout | | 62,461 | 72.5 | −2.0 |
| Conservative hold | | Swing | +1.0 | |

General election 1983: Horsham
| Party | Candidate | Votes | % | ±% |
|---|---|---|---|---|
| Conservative | Peter Hordern | 37,897 | 63.2 | |
| Alliance (SDP) | Giles Archibald | 16,112 | 26.9 | |
| Labour | Geoffrey Ward | 4,999 | 8.3 | |
| Ecology | Peter H. Spurrier | 925 | 1.6 | |
| Majority | | 21,785 | 36.3 | |
| Turnout | | 59,933 | 74.5 | |
| Conservative win (new seat) | | | | |

=== Elections in the 1970s ===
General election 1970: Horsham
| Party | Candidate | Votes | % | ±% |
|---|---|---|---|---|
| Conservative | Peter Hordern | 41,994 | 53.65 | +7.85 |
| Labour | Anthony J Edwards | 27,706 | 35.40 | −1.80 |
| Liberal | Anthony Gill | 8,574 | 10.95 | −6.05 |
| Majority | | 14,288 | 18.25 | +9.64 |
| Turnout | | 78,274 | 73.99 | |
| Conservative hold | | Swing | +4.82 | |

=== Elections in the 1960s ===
General election 1966: Horsham
| Party | Candidate | Votes | % | ±% |
|---|---|---|---|---|
| Conservative | Peter Hordern | 32,139 | 45.80 | −1.58 |
| Labour | John Bowyer | 26,098 | 37.19 | +4.28 |
| Liberal | Owen Burne | 11,930 | 17.00 | −1.43 |
| Majority | | 6,041 | 8.61 | −5.86 |
| Turnout | | 70,167 | 78.95 | −0.53 |
| Conservative hold | | Swing | −2.93 | |

General election 1964: Horsham
| Party | Candidate | Votes | % | ±% |
|---|---|---|---|---|
| Conservative | Peter Hordern | 32,318 | 47.39 | −13.43 |
| Labour | Alfred E Pegler | 22,450 | 32.92 | −6.26 |
| Liberal | Owen GN Burne | 12,570 | 18.43 | New |
| Christian Progressive | James Lee | 865 | 1.27 | New |
| Majority | | 9,868 | 14.47 | −7.17 |
| Turnout | | 68,203 | 79.48 | −0.51 |
| Conservative hold | | Swing | −3.59 | |

=== Elections in the 1950s ===
General election 1959: Horsham
| Party | Candidate | Votes | % | ±% |
|---|---|---|---|---|
| Conservative | Frederick Gough | 37,275 | 60.82 | |
| Labour | Alfred E Pegler | 24,012 | 39.18 | |
| Majority | | 13,263 | 21.64 | |
| Turnout | | 61,287 | 79.99 | |
| Conservative hold | | Swing | | |

General election 1955: Horsham
| Party | Candidate | Votes | % | ±% |
|---|---|---|---|---|
| Conservative | Frederick Gough | 28,598 | 62.60 | |
| Labour | William Baker | 17,088 | 37.40 | |
| Majority | | 11,510 | 25.20 | |
| Turnout | | 45,686 | 76.43 | |
| Conservative hold | | Swing | | |

General election 1951: Horsham
| Party | Candidate | Votes | % | ±% |
|---|---|---|---|---|
| Conservative | Frederick Gough | 25,204 | 66.31 | |
| Labour | Russell Kerr | 12,803 | 33.69 | |
| Majority | | 12,401 | 32.62 | |
| Turnout | | 38,007 | 77.71 | |
| Conservative hold | | Swing | | |

General election 1950: Horsham
| Party | Candidate | Votes | % | ±% |
|---|---|---|---|---|
| Conservative | Edward Turnour | 21,627 | 56.36 | |
| Labour | HR Nicholls | 11,204 | 29.20 | |
| Liberal | Ella Margaret Marchant | 5,539 | 14.44 | |
| Majority | | 10,423 | 27.16 | |
| Turnout | | 38,370 | 79.78 | |
| Conservative hold | | Swing | | |

=== Elections in the 1940s ===
General election 1945: Horsham
| Party | Candidate | Votes | % | ±% |
|---|---|---|---|---|
| Conservative | Edward Turnour | 21,814 | 54.96 | |
| Labour | Augustus Lindner | 11,664 | 29.38 | |
| Liberal | Charles Williamson | 6,216 | 15.66 | |
| Majority | | 10,150 | 25.58 | |
| Turnout | | 39,694 | 68.40 | |
| Conservative win (new seat) | | | | |

=== Elections in the 1910s ===
General election December 1910: Horsham
| Party | Candidate | Votes | % | ±% |
|---|---|---|---|---|
| Conservative | Edward Turnour | Unopposed | | |
| Conservative hold | | | | |

General election January 1910: Horsham
| Party | Candidate | Votes | % | ±% |
|---|---|---|---|---|
| Conservative | Edward Turnour | 6,324 | 64.2 | +10.8 |
| Liberal | R. L. Outhwaite | 3,534 | 35.8 | −10.8 |
| Majority | | 2,790 | 28.4 | +21.6 |
| Turnout | | 9,858 | 85.8 | −1.6 |
| Registered electors | | 11,484 | | |
| Conservative hold | | Swing | +10.8 | |

=== Elections in the 1900s ===
General election 1906: Horsham
| Party | Candidate | Votes | % | ±% |
|---|---|---|---|---|
| Conservative | Edward Turnour | 4,903 | 53.4 | N/A |
| Liberal | Lestocq Robert Erskine | 4,286 | 46.6 | N/A |
| Majority | | 617 | 6.8 | N/A |
| Turnout | | 9,189 | 87.4 | N/A |
| Registered electors | | 10,508 | | |
| Conservative hold | | Swing | N/A | |

1904 Horsham by-election
| Party | Candidate | Votes | % | ±% |
|---|---|---|---|---|
| Conservative | Edward Turnour | 4,388 | 54.9 | N/A |
| Liberal | Lestocq Robert Erskine | 3,604 | 45.1 | N/A |
| Majority | | 784 | 9.8 | N/A |
| Turnout | | 7,992 | 78.5 | N/A |
| Registered electors | | 10,183 | | |
| Conservative hold | | Swing | N/A | |

General election 1900: Horsham
| Party | Candidate | Votes | % | ±% |
|---|---|---|---|---|
| Conservative | John Heywood Johnstone | Unopposed | | |
| Conservative hold | | | | |

=== Elections in the 1890s ===
General election 1895: Horsham
| Party | Candidate | Votes | % | ±% |
|---|---|---|---|---|
| Conservative | John Heywood Johnstone | Unopposed | | |
| Conservative hold | | | | |

1893 Horsham by-election
| Party | Candidate | Votes | % | ±% |
|---|---|---|---|---|
| Conservative | John Heywood Johnstone | 4,150 | 60.9 | −4.6 |
| Liberal | Reginald Garton Wilberforce | 2,666 | 39.1 | +4.6 |
| Majority | | 1,484 | 21.8 | −9.2 |
| Turnout | | 6,816 | 74.4 | +0.9 |
| Registered electors | | 9,157 | | |
| Conservative hold | | Swing | −4.6 | |

General election 1892: Horsham
| Party | Candidate | Votes | % | ±% |
|---|---|---|---|---|
| Conservative | Walter Barttelot | 4,303 | 65.5 | N/A |
| Liberal | Reginald Garton Wilberforce | 2,268 | 34.5 | N/A |
| Majority | | 2,035 | 31.0 | N/A |
| Turnout | | 6,571 | 73.5 | N/A |
| Registered electors | | 8,938 | | |
| Conservative hold | | Swing | N/A | |

=== Elections in the 1880s ===
General election 1886: Horsham
| Party | Candidate | Votes | % | ±% |
|---|---|---|---|---|
| Conservative | Walter Barttelot | Unopposed | | |
| Conservative hold | | | | |

General election 1885: Horsham
| Party | Candidate | Votes | % | ±% |
|---|---|---|---|---|
| Conservative | Walter Barttelot | 4,483 | 64.5 | +9.9 |
| Liberal | Samuel Barrow | 2,467 | 35.5 | −9.9 |
| Majority | | 2,016 | 29.0 | +19.8 |
| Turnout | | 6,950 | 81.0 | −10.4 |
| Registered electors | | 8,582 | | |
| Conservative hold | | Swing | +9.9 | |

By-election, 16 July 1885: Horsham
| Party | Candidate | Votes | % | ±% |
|---|---|---|---|---|
| Conservative | Henry Aubrey-Fletcher | Unopposed | | |
| Conservative hold | | | | |

- Caused by Aubrey-Fletcher's appointment as a Groom in Waiting.

General election 1880: Horsham
| Party | Candidate | Votes | % | ±% |
|---|---|---|---|---|
| Conservative | Henry Aubrey-Fletcher | 605 | 54.6 | −8.1 |
| Liberal | James Clifton Brown | 504 | 45.4 | +8.1 |
| Majority | | 101 | 9.2 | −16.2 |
| Turnout | | 1,109 | 91.4 | +4.5 |
| Registered electors | | 1,214 | | |
| Conservative hold | | Swing | −8.1 | |

=== Elections in the 1870s ===
1876 Horsham by-election
| Party | Candidate | Votes | % | ±% |
|---|---|---|---|---|
| Liberal | James Clifton Brown | 478 | 53.0 | +15.7 |
| Conservative | Hardinge Giffard | 424 | 47.0 | −15.7 |
| Majority | | 54 | 6.0 | N/A |
| Turnout | | 902 | 89.6 | +2.7 |
| Registered electors | | 1,007 | | |
| Liberal gain from Conservative | | Swing | +15.7 | |

- Caused by the by-election being declared void on petition.

1875 Horsham by-election
| Party | Candidate | Votes | % | ±% |
|---|---|---|---|---|
| Liberal | Robert Henry Hurst | 437 | 50.5 | +13.2 |
| Conservative | John Aldridge | 424 | 49.0 | −13.7 |
| Permissive Bill | Thomas Richardson | 5 | 0.6 | New |
| Majority | | 13 | 1.5 | |
| Turnout | | 866 | 87.3 | +0.4 |
| Registered electors | | 992 | | |
| Liberal gain from Conservative | | Swing | +13.4 | |

- Caused by Vesey-FitzGerald's appointment as Chief Charity Commissioner for England and Wales.

General election 1874: Horsham
| Party | Candidate | Votes | % | ±% |
|---|---|---|---|---|
| Conservative | William Vesey-FitzGerald | 520 | 62.7 | +12.7 |
| Liberal | Robert Henry Hurst | 310 | 37.3 | −12.7 |
| Majority | | 210 | 25.4 | |
| Turnout | | 830 | 86.9 | −8.2 |
| Registered electors | | 955 | | |
| Conservative gain from Liberal | | Swing | +12.7 | |

=== Elections in the 1860s ===
General election 1868: Horsham
| Party | Candidate | Votes | % | ±% |
|---|---|---|---|---|
| Liberal | Robert Henry Hurst | 380 | 50.0 | −0.8 |
| Conservative | John Aldridge | 380 | 50.0 | +0.8 |
| Majority | | 0 | 0.0 | −1.6 |
| Turnout | | 760 | 95.1 | +14.3 |
| Registered electors | | 799 | | |
| Liberal hold | | Swing | −0.8 | |
| Conservative win | | | | |

- Both candidates received the same number of votes, and both were declared elected, with petitions lodged against both. However, on 3 May 1869, Aldridge withdrew his claim to the seat allowing Hurst to be the sole MP.

General election 1865: Horsham
| Party | Candidate | Votes | % | ±% |
|---|---|---|---|---|
| Liberal | Robert Henry Hurst | 164 | 50.8 | N/A |
| Conservative | William Vesey-FitzGerald | 159 | 49.2 | N/A |
| Majority | | 5 | 1.6 | N/A |
| Turnout | | 323 | 80.8 | N/A |
| Registered electors | | 400 | | |
| Liberal gain from Conservative | | Swing | N/A | |

=== Elections in the 1850s ===
General election 1859: Horsham
| Party | Candidate | Votes | % | ±% |
|---|---|---|---|---|
| Conservative | William Vesey-FitzGerald | Unopposed | | |
| Registered electors | | 387 | | |
| Conservative hold | | | | |

General election 1857: Horsham
| Party | Candidate | Votes | % | ±% |
|---|---|---|---|---|
| Conservative | William Vesey-FitzGerald | 173 | 59.7 | N/A |
| Independent Whig | James Scott | 117 | 40.3 | N/A |
| Majority | | 56 | 19.4 | N/A |
| Turnout | | 290 | 82.9 | N/A |
| Registered electors | | 350 | | |
| Conservative hold | | Swing | N/A | |

General election 1852: Horsham
| Party | Candidate | Votes | % | ±% |
|---|---|---|---|---|
| Conservative | William Vesey-FitzGerald | Unopposed | | |
| Registered electors | | 350 | | |
| Conservative gain from Radical | | | | |

=== Elections in the 1840s ===
By-election, 28 June 1848: Horsham
| Party | Candidate | Votes | % | ±% |
|---|---|---|---|---|
| Conservative | William Vesey-FitzGerald | 182 | 61.3 | +12.7 |
| Whig | Edward Fitzalan-Howard | 115 | 38.7 | −12.7 |
| Majority | | 67 | 22.6 | |
| Turnout | | 297 | 84.6 | −8.9 |
| Registered electors | | 351 | | |
| Conservative gain from Radical | | Swing | +12.7 | |

- Held due to the 1847 general election result being declared void on petition, due to treating, on 23 March 1848. After a further petition arising from the by-election, Vesey-Fitzgerald was declared unduly elected, due to bribery and treating by both him and his agents, and Fitzalan-Howard was declared elected on 8 September 1848.

General election 1847: Horsham
| Party | Candidate | Votes | % | ±% |
|---|---|---|---|---|
| Radical | John Jervis | 164 | 51.4 | N/A |
| Conservative | William Vesey-FitzGerald | 155 | 48.6 | N/A |
| Majority | | 9 | 2.8 | N/A |
| Turnout | | 319 | 93.5 | N/A |
| Registered electors | | 341 | | |
| Radical gain from Conservative | | Swing | N/A | |

By-election, 1 May 1844: Horsham
| Party | Candidate | Votes | % | ±% |
|---|---|---|---|---|
| Radical | Robert Henry Hurst | Unopposed | | |
| Radical gain from Conservative | | | | |

- Caused by Scarlett's succession to the peerage, becoming 2nd Baron Abinger

General election 1841: Horsham
| Party | Candidate | Votes | % | ±% |
|---|---|---|---|---|
| Conservative | Robert Scarlett | Unopposed | | |
| Registered electors | | 377 | | |
| Conservative gain from Radical | | | | |

=== Elections in the 1830s ===
General election 1837: Horsham
| Party | Candidate | Votes | % | ±% |
|---|---|---|---|---|
| Radical | Robert Henry Hurst | 147 | 50.3 | −0.3 |
| Conservative | Thomas Broadwood | 145 | 49.7 | +0.3 |
| Majority | | 2 | 0.6 | −0.6 |
| Turnout | | 292 | 91.5 | +1.9 |
| Registered electors | | 319 | | |
| Radical hold | | Swing | −0.3 | |

General election 1835: Horsham
| Party | Candidate | Votes | % | ±% |
|---|---|---|---|---|
| Radical | Robert Henry Hurst | 127 | 50.6 | −10.0 |
| Conservative | Thomas Broadwood | 124 | 49.4 | New |
| Majority | | 3 | 1.2 | −20.0 |
| Turnout | | 251 | 89.6 | +16.4 |
| Registered electors | | 280 | | |
| Radical hold | | Swing | | |

General election 1832: Horsham
| Party | Candidate | Votes | % |
|---|---|---|---|
| Radical | Robert Henry Hurst | 114 | 60.6 |
| Whig | Edward Blount | 74 | 39.4 |
| Majority | | 40 | 21.2 |
| Turnout | | 188 | 73.2 |
| Registered electors | | 257 | |
| Radical gain from Whig | | | |

General election 1831: Horsham
| Party | Candidate | Votes | % |
|---|---|---|---|
| Whig | Nicholas Ridley-Colborne | Unopposed | |
| Whig | Henry Howard | Unopposed | |
| Registered electors | | c. 103 | |
| Whig hold | | | |
| Whig hold | | | |

General election 1830: Horsham
| Party | Candidate | Votes | % |
|---|---|---|---|
| Whig | Nicholas Ridley-Colborne | Unopposed | |
| Whig | Henry Howard | Unopposed | |
| Whig hold | | | |
| Whig hold | | | |

== See also ==
- Parliamentary constituencies in West Sussex
- List of parliamentary constituencies in the South East England (region)
- Horsham

== Sources ==
- Election result, 2010 (BBC)
- Election result, 2005 (BBC)
- Election results, 1997 – 2001 (BBC)
- Election results, 1997 – 2001 (Election Demon)
- Election results, 1983 – 1992 (Election Demon)
- Election results, 1992 – 2010 (Guardian)

Parliament of the United Kingdom
| Preceded by Caernarvon Boroughs | Constituency represented by the father of the House; 1945–1951 | Succeeded by Antrim North |
