= Sir John Covert, 1st Baronet =

English politician

Sir John Covert, 1st Baronet (6 June 1620 – 11 March 1679), was an English politician.

Covert was the son of Sir Walter Covert, of Maidstone, Kent, by Ann Covert, daughter and heiress of John Covert, of Slaugham, Sussex. He was created a baronet, of Slaugham in the County of Sussex, on 2 July 1660. The following year he was returned to parliament as one of two representatives for Horsham, a seat he held until his death in 1679.

Covert married Isabella Leigh, daughter of Sir William Leigh, of Longborow, Gloucestershire. They had one son, Walter Covert (d. 1672), and four daughters. The third daughter, Mary, was the second wife of Henry Goring. Covert died in March 1679, aged 58, when the baronetcy became extinct. Lady Covert died in September 1680.

Parliament of England
Preceded by Thomas Middleton; Hall Ravenscroft	Member of Parliament for Horsham; 1661–1679; With: Henry Chowne 1661–1669; Orlando Bridgeman 1669–1679	Succeeded by Anthony Eversfield; John Michell
Baronetage of England
New creation	Baronet (of Slaugham); 1660–1679	Extinct
