= Thomas Middleton (Sussex) =

English politician, died c.1662

Thomas Middleton (1 March 1589 – c. 1662) of Horsham and Hangleton, Sussex was an English politician who sat in the House of Commons variously between 1640 and 1660. He supported the Parliamentarian side in the English Civil War.

Middleton was the son of John Middleton of Hill's Place, Horsham and his wife Frances Fowle, daughter of Nicholas Fowle of Rotherfield, Sussex. His father was MP for Horsham between 1614 and 1629. Middleton attended Trinity College, Cambridge in 1606 and was a student of Inner Temple in 1607. He succeeded to his father's estates at Horsham in 1636.

In April 1640, Middleton was elected Member of Parliament for Horsham in the Short Parliament. He was re-elected MP for Horsham in November 1640 for the Long Parliament Middleton supported the Parliamentarian side, but in December 1643 he did not show any force against the Royalist troops in Sussex and was later charged with providing support to the Royalists. He was absolved of the charges against him but was re-arrested in 1648 in connection with a rising that took place at Horsham that year.

In 1660, Middleton was re-elected MP for Horsham in the Convention Parliament.

Middleton married Barbara Shelley, daughter of Henry Shelley of Warminghurst, Sussex on 29 May 1610 and had six sons and five daughters.

Parliament of England
Parliament suspended since 1629	Member of Parliament for Horsham; 1640–1653; With: Hall Ravenscroft	Parliament suspended until 1640
Preceded by William Freeman; Henry Chowne	Member of Parliament for Horsham; 1659–1660; With: Hall Ravenscroft	Succeeded by Sir John Covert, Bt; Henry Chowne
