= Francis Macnamara =

Irish politician

Francis Macnamara (1802 – 27 June 1873) was an Irish politician.

Born in London, Macnamara was the son of William Nugent Macnamara, a landowner and the Member of Parliament for County Clare. He was educated in Brussels, and then studied from 1820 until 1824 at Christ's College, Cambridge, without graduating.

Macnamara served as a lieutenant in the 8th Hussars before standing in Ennis at the 1832 UK general election. He was elected for the Repeal Association, but stood down at the 1835 UK general election. He also served as Sheriff of County Clare, and as one of the county's deputy-lieutenants.

From 1854 until 1871, Macnmara served as Lieutenant-Colonel of the Clare Militia.

Parliament of the United Kingdom
Preceded by Augustine FitzGerald	Member of Parliament for Ennis; 1832–1835	Succeeded by Hewitt Bridgeman
