= Henry Boteler =

Henry Boteler may refer to:

- Henry Boteler (fl. 1386–1397), MP for Horsham
- Henry Boteler (fl. 1413–1427), MP for Horsham

== See also ==
- Henry Butler (disambiguation)
