= 1875 Horsham by-election =

UK Parliamentary by-election

The 1875 Horsham by-election was fought on 17 December 1875. The by-election was fought due to the resignation of the incumbent Conservative MP, William Vesey-FitzGerald, who became Chief Charity Commissioner for England and Wales. It was won by the Liberal candidate Robert Henry Hurst (junior). who had previously been MP for the seat but was defeated at the previous General Election.

1875 Horsham by-election
Party	Candidate	Votes	%	±%
Liberal	Robert Henry Hurst	437	50.5	+13.2
Conservative	John Aldridge	424	49.0	−13.7
Permissive Bill	Thomas Richardson	5	0.6	New
Majority		13	1.5	N/A
Turnout		866	87.3	+0.4
Registered electors		992		
Liberal gain from Conservative		Swing	+13.4	

This election was declared void and Hurst did not stand in the by-election in 1876.
