= 1879 Ennis by-election =

UK Parliamentary by-election

The 1879 Ennis by-election was fought on 26 July 1879. The by-election was fought due to the death of the incumbent Home Rule MP, William Stacpoole. It was won by the Home Rule candidate James Lysaght Finegan.
