= Hall Ravenscroft =

Hall Ravenscroft (c. 1600 – c. 1673) was an English politician who sat in the House of Commons at various times between 1640 and 1660.

Ravenscroft was the son of John Ravenscroft of Horsham, Sussex and his wife Judith Ferne, daughter of George Ferne. He matriculated at Christ Church, Oxford on 8 November 1616 and was a student of Lincoln's Inn in 1618.

In April 1640, Ravenscroft was elected Member of Parliament for Horsham in the Short Parliament. He was re-elected MP for Horsham in November 1640 for the Long Parliament and survived Pride's Purge to sit in the Rump Parliament until 1653.

In May 1659 the Rump Parliament sat again and in 1660 Ravenscroft was re-elected MP for Horsham in the Convention Parliament.

Ravenscroft married Eliza Stapley, daughter of John Stapley of Hickstead in the parish of Twineham, Sussex. Their only child was a daughter Elizabeth who married Thomas Delves, son of Sir Henry Delves, 2nd Baronet.

Parliament of England
Vacant Parliament suspended since 1629	Member of Parliament for Horsham; 1640–1653; With: Thomas Middleton	Not represented in the Barebones Parliament
Preceded by William Freeman; Henry Chowne	Member of Parliament for Horsham; 1659–1660; With: Thomas Middleton	Succeeded by Sir John Covert, Bt; Henry Chowne
