= Henry Boteler (fl. 1413–1427) =

English politician

Henry Boteler (fl. 1413–1427), of Horsham, Sussex, was an English politician.

== Family ==
Boteler was the son of Henry Boteler, also an MP for Horsham.

== Career ==
He was a Member (MP) of the Parliament of England for Horsham in May 1413, March 1416, December 1421, 1422 and 1427.
