= 1876 Horsham by-election =

UK parliamentary by-election

The 1876 Horsham by-election was held on 29 February 1876. The by-election was fought due to the previous by-election being declared void. This had resulted in the election of the Liberal MP Robert Henry Hurst (junior).

The Conservative candidate, Sir Hardinge Giffard, had been appointed as Solicitor General the year before, although he had not yet got a seat in the Commons. It was won by the Liberal candidate James Clifton Brown.

== Result ==
Horsham by-election, 29 February 1876
| Party | Candidate | Votes | % | ±% |
|---|---|---|---|---|
| Liberal | James Clifton Brown | 478 | 53.0 | +15.7 |
| Conservative | Sir Hardinge Giffard | 424 | 47.0 | −15.7 |
| Majority | | 54 | 6.0 | N/A |
| Turnout | | 902 | 89.6 | +2.7 |
| Registered electors | | 1,007 | | |
| Liberal gain from Conservative | | Swing | +15.7 | |
