= Philip Boteler =

Philip Boteler may refer to:

- Sir Philip Boteler, 3rd Baronet (c. 1667–1719), MP for Hythe
- Sir Philip Boteler, 4th Baronet (c. 1695–1772), of the Boteler baronets
- Captain Phil(l)ip Boteler of HMS Ardent
- Philip Boteler (MP for Hertfordshire) (died 1545), Member of Parliament

== See also ==
- Boteler (surname)
