= John Middleton (MP for Horsham) =

John Middleton (died 1636) was an English landowner and politician who sat in the House of Commons between 1614 and 1629.

Middleton was born after 1558 to ironmaster Richard Middleton of Stoneham and his wife Mary Porter of Cuckfield. His father had built up an estate around Horsham, Sussex. Middleton came into possession of Hills Place, Horsham between 1610 and 1636.

In 1614, he was elected Member of Parliament for Horsham. He was re-elected MP for Horsham in 1621, 1624, 1625, 1626 and 1628. There, he sat, until 1629 when King Charles decided to rule without parliament for eleven years. He was appointed High Sheriff of Surrey and Sussex for 1617–18.

Middleton married Frances Fowle, daughter of Nicholas Fowle of Rotherfield, Sussex. His son Thomas was also later MP for Horsham.

Parliament of England
Preceded by John Dodderidge; Michael Hicks	Member of Parliament for Horsham; 1614–1629; With: Sir Thomas Vavasour 1614; Thomas Cornwallis 1621–1622; John Borough 1624–1626; Dudley North 1628–1629	Parliament suspended until 1640
