= William Rydelere (fl. 1393) =

English politician

William Rydelere (fl. 1393), of Horsham, Sussex, was an English politician.

== Family ==
His father was also an MP for Horsham, William Rydelere. He had one sister; the names of his mother and sister are unrecorded.

== Career ==
He was a Member (MP) of the Parliament of England for Horsham in 1393.

Parliament of England
Preceded by Henry Boteler; Thomas Jewdry	Member of Parliament for Horsham; 1393; With: William Chode	Succeeded by ? ?
