= George O'Callaghan-Westropp =

Colonel George O'Callaghan-Westropp JP (18 February 1864 – 30 July 1944), also known as The O'Callaghan, was an Irish landowner, soldier and political figure of the early 20th century.

== Biography ==
He was born George O'Callaghan, son of Colonel John O'Callaghan and Mary Johnson Westropp, and raised in the Church of Ireland.

He lived at Coolreagh, an Anglo-Irish big house in County Clare. In 1885, he added "Westropp" to his name under the terms of a bequest by his aunt Catherine's husband Ralph, who left him an estate at Fortanne. In 1895, he married Henrietta Cecile Rose Godbold; they had four children.

He was commissioned as a Lieutenant in the Royal Irish Rifles on 9 September 1882 and rose to the rank of Captain on 19 September 1888 before retiring. He then took a captain's commission on 20 February 1889 in the Clare Artillery (Southern Division, Royal Artillery), a part-time Militia unit. He was promoted to Major on 18 August 1897, and then to Lieutenant-Colonel in command on 3 December 1898. He remained in command of the unit (which became the Clare Royal Garrison Artillery (Militia) in 1902 and the Clare Royal Field Reserve Artillery in 1908) until its disbandment in 1909. In 1905, O'Callaghan-Westropp was named honorary Aide de Camp to King Edward VII in the 1905 Birthday Honours.

He inherited his father's estate in 1912, 4,000 acres (16 km^{2}) and five hundred tenants. He styled himself "The O'Callaghan", claiming chieftainship of the Gaelic O'Callaghan (Ó Ceallacháin) sept. They had lost their land in County Cork during the 17th-century Cromwellian conquest of Ireland and were transplanted beyond the River Shannon. The Chief Herald of Ireland in 1943 ruled that the rightful heir to the Chiefship was an O'Callaghan living in Spain.

O'Callaghan-Westropp was politically a Unionist and a leading member of the County Clare Unionist Club. In 1911, he addressed a meeting of the Hollywood Unionist Club in County Down. He issued a pamphlet, Notes on the Defence of Irish Country Houses.

In 1919, O'Callaghan-Westropp was named as High Sheriff of Clare.

During the Irish War of Independence, O'Callaghan publicly condemned British troops as "running wild" and "recruiting for Sinn Féin by their crimes"; he eventually changed to supporting dominion Home Rule. In reprisal, Black and Tans burned a hay barn and cattle shed on his property and issued a threatening letter.

He was nominated to the short-lived Senate of Southern Ireland in 1921.

In 1925, O'Callaghan-Westropp was proposed for election to the Seanad, but lost the by-election. He was a member of the Farmers' Party.

O'Callaghan-Westropp's wife died in 1929. He remarried in 1937 to Muriel Haidee Battley and died in 1944. He was buried at the family plot in the church of St Mochulla, Tulla.

Coat of arms of George O'Callaghan-Westropp

Notes
Granted 12 October 1885 by Sir John Bernard Burke, Ulster King of Arms.
Crest
1st out of an antique crown Or an eagle's head Sable (Westropp) 2nd a naked arm embowed holding a sword bendwise entwined with a snake all Proper, on a scroll above "FIDUS ET AUDAX".
Escutcheon
Quarterly 1st & 4th Sable a lion rampant per fess Argent and Or ducally crowned of the last armed and langued Gules (Westropp) 2nd & 3rd Argent in base a mount Vert on the dexter side a burst of oak trees therefrom issuant a wolf passant towards the sinister all Proper (O'Callaghan).
Motto
Je Tourne Vers L'Occident
