= Robert Henry Hurst (junior) =

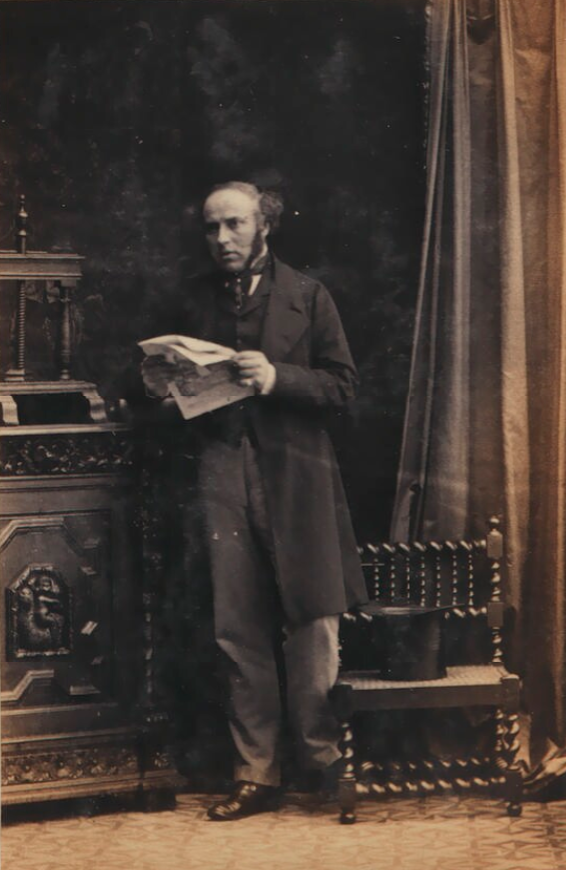
Robert Henry Hurst, 1862 photograph.

Robert Henry Hurst (1 June 1817 – 12 February 1905) was an English Liberal Party politician and Recorder for Hastings and Rye. He was Member of Parliament (MP) for Horsham from 1865 to 1868, and from 1875 to 1876.

== Early life and education ==
Hurst was born in Brighton, Sussex, the only son of Robert Henry Hurst and Dorothea Breynton. He was educated at Westminster School and studied jurisprudence at Trinity College, Cambridge.

== Career ==
Hurst was elected to the House of Commons on his first attempt at the 1865 general election, winning the seat previously held by his father. He was defeated at the 1868 by the Conservative Party candidate John Aldridge, but petitions were lodged against both candidates and Aldridge chose not to defend his claim so Hurst was declared elected in 1869.

He was defeated in the 1874 general election by the Conservative William Vesey-FitzGerald, but when Vesey-FitzGerald was appointed as Chief Charity Commissioner for England and Wales in 1875, he was required by the rules at the time to seek re-election. Hurst won the resulting Horsham by-election, but after a petition the by-election result was declared void. Hurst did not stand for Parliament again.

== Personal life ==
He married Matilda Jane Scott, daughter of James Scott of Rusper, Sussex. He was the father of judge Sir Cecil Hurst.

Parliament of the United Kingdom
| Preceded by William Vesey-FitzGerald | Member of Parliament for Horsham; 1865 – 1868 | Succeeded by John Aldridge |
| Preceded by John Aldridge | Member of Parliament for Horsham; 1869 – 1874 | Succeeded by William Vesey-FitzGerald |
| Preceded by William Vesey-FitzGerald | Member of Parliament for Horsham; 1875 – 1876 | Succeeded by James Clifton Brown |
