= Hewitt Bridgeman =

Irish Radical politician (died 1853)

Member of Parliament for Ennis
- In office 14 January 1835 – 3 August 1847
- Preceded by: Francis McNamara
- Succeeded by: James Patrick Mahon

Personal details
- Died: 13 February 1853
- Party: Radical

Hewitt Bridgeman (died 13 February 1853) was an Irish Radical politician.

After unsuccessfully contesting the 1832 general election at Ennis, Bridgeman was elected a Radical MP for the constituency at the 1835 election and held the seat until 1847 when he did not seek re-election.

Parliament of the United Kingdom
Preceded by Francis Macnamara	Member of Parliament for Ennis; 1835–1847	Succeeded by James Patrick Mahon
