= Roger Eylove (MP for Horsham) =

Member of the Parliament of England

Roger Eylove (fl. 1395) was a Member of Parliament for Horsham in 1395.
