= Ennis (UK Parliament constituency) =

UK parliamentary constituency in Ireland, 1801–1885

- Former borough constituency for the House of Commons
- County: County Clare
- Borough: Ennis

1801–1885
- Seats: 1
- Created from: Ennis
- Replaced by: East Clare

Ennis is a former United Kingdom Parliament constituency in Ireland, returning one MP. It was an original constituency represented in Parliament when the Union of Great Britain and Ireland took effect on 1 January 1801.

It was disfranchised under the Redistribution of Seats Act 1885, which took effect at the 1885 general election.

== Boundaries ==
This constituency was the parliamentary borough of Ennis in County Clare. In January 1832, boundary commissioners proposed boundaries for the borough. It was defined by the Parliamentary Boundaries (Ireland) Act 1832 as:

From the Clareen Bridge, in a straight Line in a South-westerly Direction, to the Point at which the Road round the Hill from Inch Bridge meets the Road to the Hermitage; thence along a Bye Road which runs Southward from the Point last described to the Point (about Two hundred and twenty Yards from the Point last described) at which such Bye Road is met by an Orchard Wall; thence in a straight Line to the Eastern Pier of a Gate on the Inch Bridge Road which is the Entrance to Mr. Crow's Farm; thence ina straight Line to the Eastern Pier of a Gate on the Kilrush Road about Two hundred and thirty Yards to the East of the Point at which a Road branches from the Kilrush Road to join the Inch Bridge Road; thence in a straight Line in a South-easterly Direction to the South-western Corner of Mr. Healy's Garden; thence along the Southern Wall of the same Garden to the Point at which the same meets the Clare Road; thence, Northward and Eastward, along the Mail Coach Road from Clare (for about Three Quarters of a Mile) to the Point at which the same is met by a Wall on the Northern Side thereof near a Well; thence in a straight Line to the North-western Corner of the Wall which surrounds a Distillery on the Banks of the River Fergus, but not now in use; thence along the last-mentioned Wall, including the Distillery, to the Point at which the same Wall meets the River Fergus; thence in a straight Line in a North-easterly Direction to the Point at which the Spancel Hill or Southern Gort Road is joined by a Cross Road from the Northern Gort Road, and which Point is distant about Four hundred Yards from the Bridge over the River Fergus; thence along the last-mentioned Cross Road to the Point at which the same joins the Northern Gort Road; thence along the same Northern Gort Road for Twenty-five Yards beyond the Point last described; thence in a straight Line in a North-westerly Direction to the Windmill Stump; thence in a straight Line to the Clareen Bridge.

== Members of Parliament ==
Election	Member	Party	Note
1801	John Ormsby Vandeleur	Tory	1801: Co-opted
1802	Rt Hon. James Fitzgerald	Tory	Resigned (appointed Escheator of Munster)
1808	Rt Hon. William Vesey-Fitzgerald	Tory	
1812	Rt Hon. James Fitzgerald	Tory	Resigned (appointed Escheator of Munster)
1813	Rt Hon. William Vesey-Fitzgerald	Tory	
1818	Spencer Perceval	Tory	Not the Prime Minister assassinated in 1812 but his son
1820	Sir Ross Mahon, Bt	Tory	Resigned (appointed Escheator of Munster)
1820	Richard Wellesley	Tory	
1826	Thomas Frankland Lewis	Tory	Resigned
1828	William Smith O'Brien	Tory (Note: Stooks Smith classifies O'Brien as a Whig MP, although the History of Parliament records, "He later recalled that during this session, 'I gave no regular support to the Tory ministry', but he sided with it against reducing the salary of the lieutenant-general of the ordnance, 4 July 1828".)	
1831	Rt Hon. William Vesey-Fitzgerald	Tory	Succeeded as the 2nd Baron FitzGerald and Vesey
1832	Sir Augustine Fitzgerald, Bt	Tory	
1832	Francis Macnamara	Repeal Association	
1835	Hewitt Bridgeman	Radical	
1847	James Patrick Mahon	Repeal Association	
1852	John Fitzgerald	Ind. Irish	Appointed Solicitor-General for Ireland, as a Whig
1855	John Fitzgerald	Whig	
1859	John Fitzgerald	Liberal	Appointed Judge of the Irish Queen's Bench
1860	William Stacpoole	Liberal	Sought re-election as a Home Rule League candidate
1874	William Stacpoole	Home Rule League	Died
1879	James Lysaght Finegan	Home Rule League	1880 United Kingdom general election: Supporter of Parnellite faction. Resigned.
1882	Matthew Joseph Kenny	Irish Parliamentary	
1885	Constituency abolished		

== Elections ==
=== Elections in the 1830s ===
General election 1830: Ennis
Party	Candidate	Votes	%
Tory	William Smith O'Brien	Unopposed	
Registered electors		13	
Tory hold			

General election 1831: Ennis
Party	Candidate	Votes	%
Tory	William Vesey-FitzGerald	Unopposed	
Registered electors		13	
Tory hold			

Vesey-FitzGerald succeeded to the peerage, becoming 2nd Baron FitzGerald and Vesey and causing a by-election.

By-election, 28 February 1832: Ennis
Party	Candidate	Votes	%
Tory	Augustine FitzGerald	Unopposed	
Registered electors		13	
Tory hold			

General election 1832: Ennis
Party	Candidate	Votes	%
Repeal	Francis Macnamara	111	53.4
Radical	Hewitt Bridgeman Snr.	84	40.4
Tory	Michael Finucane	10	4.8
Radical	Hewitt Bridgeman, Jnr.	3	1.4
Majority		27	13.0
Turnout		208	87.8
Registered electors		237	
Repeal gain from Tory			

General election 1835: Ennis
Party	Candidate	Votes	%	±%
Radical	Hewitt Bridgeman	100	51.5	+10.7
Conservative	Michael Finucane	94	48.5	+43.7
Majority		6	3.0	N/A
Turnout		194	81.5	−6.3
Registered electors		238		
Radical gain from Repeal		Swing	−16.3	

General election 1837: Ennis
Party	Candidate	Votes	%	±%
Radical	Hewitt Bridgeman	Unopposed		
Registered electors		353		
Radical hold				

=== Elections in the 1840s ===
General election 1841: Ennis
Party	Candidate	Votes	%	±%
Radical	Hewitt Bridgeman	Unopposed		
Registered electors		161		
Radical hold				

General election 1847: Ennis
Party	Candidate	Votes	%	±%
Repeal	James Patrick Mahon	Unopposed		
Registered electors		212		
Repeal gain from Radical				

=== Elections in the 1850s ===
General election 1852: Ennis
Party	Candidate	Votes	%	±%
Independent Irish	John FitzGerald	59	56.2	New
Whig	James Patrick Mahon	46	43.8	N/A
Majority		13	12.4	N/A
Turnout		105	73.4	N/A
Registered electors		143		
Independent Irish gain from Repeal		Swing	N/A	

FitzGerald was appointed Solicitor-General for Ireland, requiring a by-election.

By-election, 8 March 1855: Ennis
Party	Candidate	Votes	%	±%
Whig	John FitzGerald	Unopposed		
Registered electors		303		
Whig gain from Independent Irish				

FitzGerald was appointed Attorney-General for Ireland, requiring a by-election.

By-election, 8 April 1856: Ennis
Party	Candidate	Votes	%	±%
Whig	John FitzGerald	Unopposed		
Whig gain from Independent Irish				

General election 1857: Ennis
Party	Candidate	Votes	%	±%
Whig	John FitzGerald	Unopposed		
Registered electors		161		
Whig gain from Independent Irish				

General election 1859: Ennis
Party	Candidate	Votes	%	±%
Liberal	John FitzGerald	Unopposed		
Registered electors		191		
Liberal hold				

FitzGerald was appointed Attorney-General for Ireland, requiring a by-election.

By-election, 29 June 1859: Ennis
Party	Candidate	Votes	%	±%
Liberal	John FitzGerald	Unopposed		
Registered electors		191		
Liberal hold				

=== Elections in the 1860s ===
Fitzgerald resigned after being appointed a judge of the Queen's Bench, causing a by-election.

By-election, 20 February 1860: Ennis
Party	Candidate	Votes	%	±%
Liberal	William Stacpoole	Unopposed		
Liberal hold				

General election 1865: Ennis
Party	Candidate	Votes	%	±%
Liberal	William Stacpoole	97	72.9	N/A
Liberal	Chartres Brew Molony	36	27.1	N/A
Majority		61	45.8	N/A
Turnout		133	70.4	N/A
Registered electors		189		
Liberal hold		Swing	N/A	

General election 1868: Ennis
Party	Candidate	Votes	%	±%
Liberal	William Stacpoole	Unopposed		
Registered electors		231		
Liberal hold				

=== Elections in the 1870s ===
General election 1874: Ennis
Party	Candidate	Votes	%	±%
Home Rule	William Stacpoole	115	53.7	N/A
Home Rule	The O'Gorman Mahon	99	46.3	New
Majority		16	7.4	N/A
Turnout		214	88.4	N/A
Registered electors		242		
Home Rule gain from Liberal		Swing	N/A	

Stacpoole's death caused a by-election.

By-election, 26 July 1879: Ennis
Party	Candidate	Votes	%	±%
Home Rule	James Lysaght Finegan	83	38.8	N/A
Home Rule	William O'Brien	77	36.0	N/A
Conservative	William Henry Wilson Fitzgerald	54	25.2	New
Majority		6	2.8	−4.6
Turnout		214	86.6	−1.8
Registered electors		247		
Home Rule hold		Swing	N/A	

=== Elections in the 1880s ===
General election 1880: Ennis
Party	Candidate	Votes	%	±%
Parnellite Home Rule League	James Lysaght Finegan	124	56.6	N/A
Home Rule	William O'Brien	95	43.4	N/A
Majority		29	13.2	+5.8
Turnout		219	88.7	+0.3
Registered electors		247		
Home Rule hold		Swing	N/A	

Finegan resigned, causing a by-election.

By-election, 14 Nov 1882: Ennis
Party	Candidate	Votes	%	±%
Irish Parliamentary	Matthew Joseph Kenny	136	58.9	+2.3
Conservative	Robert William Carey Reeves	95	41.1	New
Majority		41	17.8	+4.6
Turnout		231	87.8	−0.9
Registered electors		263		
Irish Parliamentary hold		Swing	N/A	
