= William Stacpoole =

Irish politician (1830–1879)

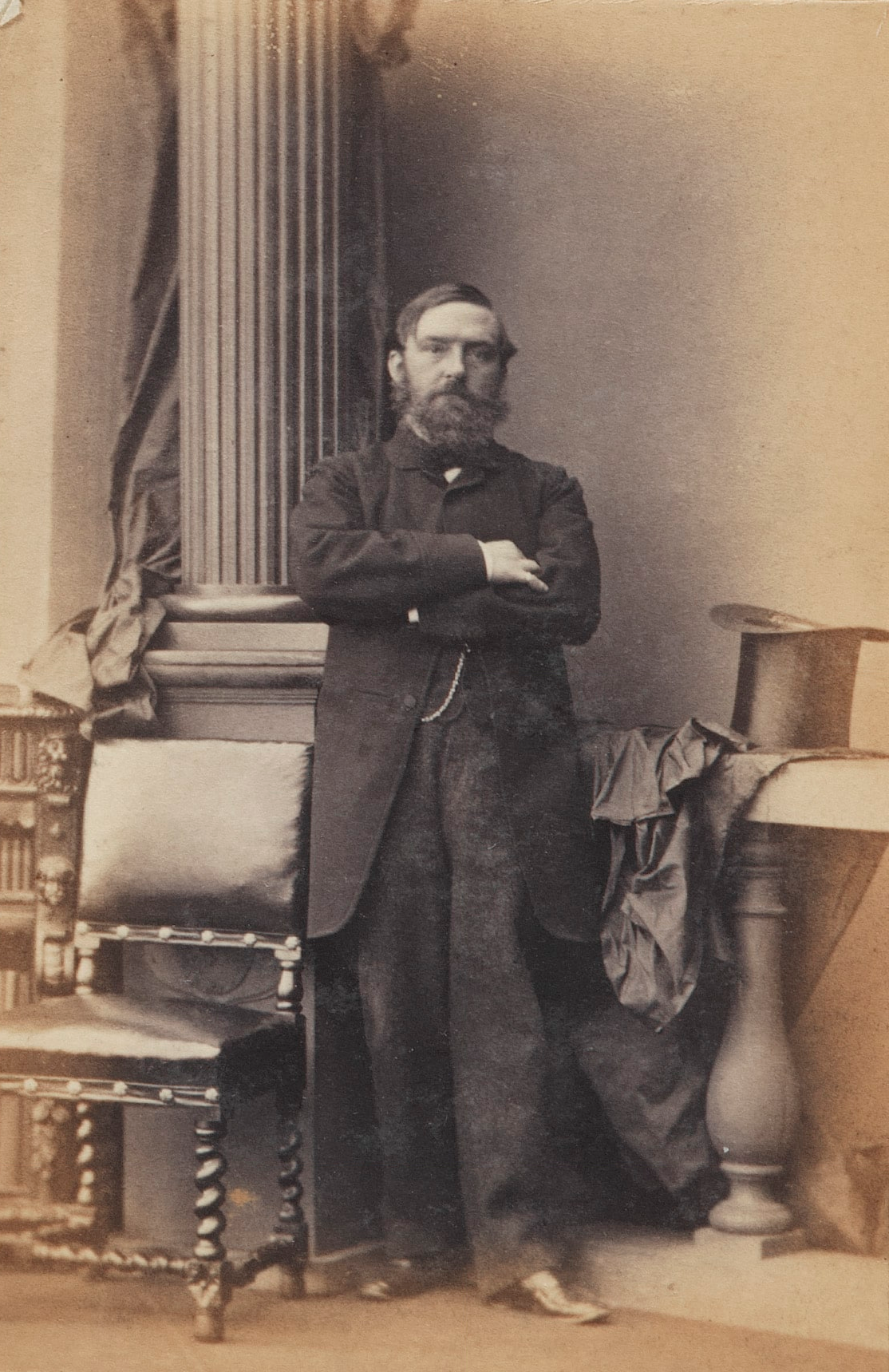
Portrait by Camille Silvy, 1861

William Stacpoole (1830 – 10 July 1879) was an Irish nationalist politician. From 1860 to 1879 he was Member of Parliament (MP) for Ennis in County Clare, taking his seat in the House of Commons of the United Kingdom of Great Britain and Ireland.

Stacpoole was elected to the Parliament at an unopposed by-election in February 1860, standing as a Liberal after the sitting Liberal MP John FitzGerald had been appointed as a judge. He was re-elected in 1865, easily defeating a rival Liberal candidate, and was returned unopposed in 1868. When he stood as a Home Rule League candidate in 1874, he faced opposition again, also from his own party. His opponent, The O'Gorman Mahon was a long-serving MP who had represented Ennis as for the Repeal Association from 1847 to 1852, but Stacpoole held the seat by 115 votes to 99. He died in office in 1879, aged 49.

Parliament of the United Kingdom
Preceded by John FitzGerald	Member of Parliament for Ennis; 1860 – 1879	Succeeded by James Lysaght Finigan
