= John Aldridge (British politician) =

John Aldridge MP

Member of Parliament for Horsham
- In office 18 November 1868 – 3 May 1869 Serving with Robert Henry Hurst
- Preceded by: Robert Henry Hurst
- Succeeded by: Robert Henry Hurst

Personal details
- Born: 4 January 1832
- Died: 23 February 1888 (aged 56)
- Resting place: Lower Beeding, Sussex, UK
- Party: Conservative
- Parent(s): Robert Aldridge; Caroline Beauclerk

Lieutenant-Colonel John Aldridge (4 January 1832 – 23 February 1888) was a British soldier, Conservative Party politician, and landowner in Sussex.

== Family ==
Aldridge was the son of Robert Aldridge and Caroline Anne, daughter of Charles George Beauclerk. He was married in 1863 to Mary Alethea, daughter of Samuel Matthews, and together they had five children:

- Emily Marian (1864–1897)
- Robert Beauclerk (1865–1892)
- Charles Powlett (1866–1941)
- Herbert Henry (1869–1922)
- John Barttelot (1871–1909)

== Military career ==
Aldridge served in the Royal Scots Fusiliers, rising to the rank of Captain in the regiment on 29 December 1854 and Brevet Major in the army on 6 June 1856. After his brief political career he was appointed Lieutenant-Colonel Commandant of the part-time Royal Sussex Light Infantry Militia (later the 3rd and 4th battalions of Royal Sussex Regiment) on 27 October 1875.

== Political career ==
He was elected MP for Horsham in 1868 alongside Robert Henry Hurst. This was unusual as the seat was only eligible to send one member. Although both candidates were declared elected, petitions were lodged against them both, and on 3 May 1869 Aldridge withdrew his claim to entitlement to the seat, leaving Hurst as the sole MP.

== St Leonard's House ==
Aldridge inherited the St Leonard's Forest estate, near Horsham, from his father, Robert Aldridge, in 1871. After 1878, he began selling land from the estate, perhaps due to the agricultural recession. Upon his death in 1888, the estate passed to his son, Robert Beauclerk Aldridge.

== Other activities ==
He was also a Justice of the Peace and a Deputy Lieutenant for Sussex.

Parliament of the United Kingdom
Preceded by Robert Henry Hurst	Member of Parliament for Horsham; 1868–1869; With: Robert Henry Hurst	Succeeded by Robert Henry Hurst
