= John Jervis (MP for Horsham) =

English politician (1826–1860)

John Jervis (1826–1860) was an English politician.

The son of John Jervis, he was briefly a Member of Parliament (MP) for Horsham from 28 July 1847 until his election was declared void on 23 March 1848.

Parliament of the United Kingdom
Preceded by Robert Henry Hurst (senior)	Member of Parliament for Horsham; 1847–1848	Succeeded by William Vesey-FitzGerald
