= Robert Henry Hurst (senior) =

British politician (1788–1857)

Robert Henry Hurst (1788–1857) was an English Whig politician. He was Member of Parliament (MP) for Horsham from 1832 to 1841, and from 1844 to 1847.

The Hursts were a major landowning family in Horsham, having purchased lands in 1812 when Horsham Common was enclosed. Between 1808 and 1814, Hurst served as an officer in the Grenadier Guards during the Peninsular War.

Hurst was elected to the House of Commons at the 1832 general election. He was re-elected in 1835 and 1837, but did not stand in 1841 general election. However his Conservative successor Robert Scarlett succeeded to the peerage in 1844, and Hurst was elected unopposed at the resulting by-election. He did not seek re-election in 1847.

Hunt married Dorothy Breynton, the daughter of John Breynton of Haunch Hall, Lichfield. Their son Robert Henry Hurst (junior) was later MP for Horsham.

Parliament of the United Kingdom
Preceded by The Earl of Arundel and Nicholas Ridley-Colborne	Member of Parliament for Horsham; 1832 – 1841	Succeeded by Robert Scarlett
Preceded by Robert Scarlett	Member of Parliament for Horsham; 1844 – 1847	Succeeded by John Jervis
