= William Rydelere (fl. 1381–1397) =

English politician

William Rydelere (fl. 1381–1397), of Horsham, Sussex, was an English politician.

== Family ==
Rydelere had two children, a son, the MP, William Rydelere, and a daughter. Her name and that of their mother are unrecorded.

== Career ==
He was a Member (MP) of the Parliament of England for Horsham in 1381, April 1384, November 1384, 1386, February 1388 and January 1397.
