= Seymour Vesey-FitzGerald =

British politician and colonial administrator (1818–1885)

The Right Honourable Sir Seymour Vesey-FitzGerald GCSI GCIE PC
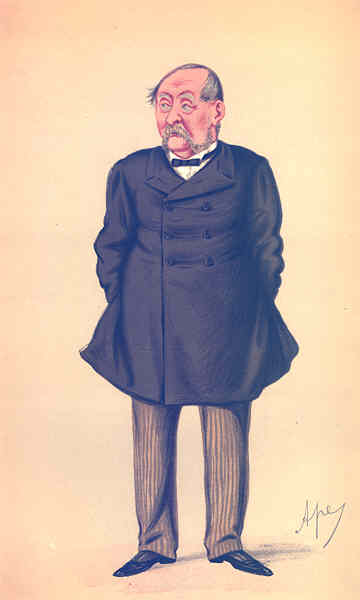
- Caricature by "Spy", 1874

Governor of Bombay
- In office 6 March 1867 – 6 May 1872
- Monarch: Victoria
- Preceded by: Sir Bartle Frere
- Succeeded by: Sir Philip Wodehouse

Personal details
- Born: 1818 County Clare
- Died: 28 June 1885 Oxford, Oxfordshire
- Party: Conservative
- Spouse: Maria Seymour
- Education: Christ Church, Oxford; Oriel College, Oxford

Sir William Robert Seymour Vesey-FitzGerald, GCSI, GCIE, PC (1818 – 28 June 1885), was an Anglo-Irish politician and colonial administrator. He served as Under-Secretary of State for Foreign Affairs between 1858 and 1859 and as Governor of Bombay between 1867 and 1872.

== Background and education ==
FitzGerald was the illegitimate son of the 2nd Baron FitzGerald and Vesey. He was educated at both Christ Church, Oxford and Oriel College, Oxford, graduating with a degree in Classics in 1837.

== Political career ==
FitzGerald was elected member for Horsham in 1848, but was unseated on petition. In 1852 he was once again elected for Horsham and was able to hold the seat until 1865. He served under the Earl of Derby as Under-Secretary of State for Foreign Affairs between 1858 and 1859.

In 1866 he was appointed Governor of Bombay, admitted to the Privy Council and (17 August 1887) made a Knight Commander of the Order of the Star of India, and Knight Grand Commander of the Order of the Indian Empire.

On his return to Britain, he again represented Horsham in parliament from 1874 to 1875. In 1875, he was appointed Chief Charity Commissioner.

== Personal life ==
In 1840, Vesey-FitzGerald married Maria Tryphena Seymour (1821–1865), a daughter of Edward Seymour, and their children included William Gerald Seymour (1841–1910), Tryphena Elizabeth Seymour (born 1843), Edward Percy Seymour (1853–1924), who was the father of the naturalist and author Brian Vesey-Fitzgerald, and Carlotta Edith Beatrix Seymour (1859–1939).

== See also ==
- Baron FitzGerald and Vesey

Parliament of the United Kingdom
| Preceded by John Jervis | Member of Parliament for Horsham; 1848 | Succeeded by Lord Edward Fitzalan-Howard |
| Preceded by Lord Edward Fitzalan-Howard | Member of Parliament for Horsham; 1852–1865 | Succeeded by Robert Henry Hurst |
| Preceded by Robert Henry Hurst | Member of Parliament for Horsham; 1874–1875 | Succeeded by Robert Henry Hurst |
Political offices
| Preceded by Earl of Shelburne | Under-Secretary of State for Foreign Affairs; 1858–1859 | Succeeded by The Lord Wodehouse |
Government offices
| Preceded by Sir Bartle Frere | Governor of Bombay; 1867–1872 | Succeeded by Sir Philip Wodehouse |
