= James Clifton Brown =

British politician

James Clifton Brown JP
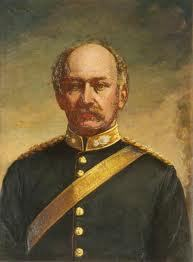

Member of Parliament for Horsham
- In office 1876–1880
- Preceded by: Robert Henry Hurst
- Succeeded by: Sir Henry Fletcher

Personal details
- Born: 13 February 1841
- Died: 5 January 1917 (aged 75)
- Party: Liberal
- Spouse: Amelia Rowe Brown (after 1866)
- Relations: Sir William Richmond Brown (brother); Sir Alexander Brown (brother); Sir William Brown (grandfather)
- Children: 10, including Howard, Douglas
- Parent(s): Alexander Brown; Sarah Benedict Brown

James Clifton Brown JP (13 February 1841 – 5 January 1917) was a British Liberal Party Member of Parliament (MP).

== Early life ==
He was the second son of Alexander Brown and his wife Sarah Benedict Brown, daughter of James Brown. His elder brother was Sir William Richmond Brown, 2nd Baronet, the High Sheriff of Northamptonshire, and his younger brother was the Liberal politician Sir Alexander Brown, 1st Baronet. His paternal grandfather was the banker and merchant Sir William Brown, 1st Baronet.

Brown was educated at Trinity Hall, Cambridge, where he graduated with a Master of Arts.

== Career ==
He was elected to the House of Commons at a by-election in 1876 for Horsham in Sussex, and held the seat until his defeat at the 1880 general election.

Brown served as Lieutenant-Colonel of both the Royal Lancashire Militia Artillery and the 1st Lancashire Artillery Volunteers and on his retirement in 1884 became the Honorary Colonel of the militia unit. He was a justice of the peace and in 1888, he was appointed High Sheriff of Sussex.

== Personal life ==
On 21 March 1866, he married Amelia Rowe, daughter of Charles Rowe and Sarah Amelia Pfeiffer. His father-in-law Charles Rowe (1819–1876) was born in Jamaica and was of mixed race.

Charles Rowe was son of planter Charles Rowe, Sr. and his 28-years younger mistress Mary Gauntlett (b. 1782), a free black woman who owned slaves herself.

Mary Gauntlett was born out of wedlock to Elizabeth Roche (De La Roche, Delaroche; 1761–1812), a half black woman described in 1795 as "a free mulatto", and Lieutenant William Gauntlett; Elizabeth Roche was the daughter of Mary, "a freed Negro" born around 1740, and white planter John De La Roche.

Clifton Brown's mother-in-law was born in Lima, Peru in 1825 to Friedrich (Frederick) Pfeiffer, an Hanoverian-born flour merchant, and his Quakeress wife who left her sect to join her husband's faith; the Pfeiffers moved to Lima in 1821. James Clifton Brown and Amelia had ten children, four daughters and six sons, including:

- Elsie Clifton Brown (1861–1958), who married Sir Evelyn Ridley Bradford, 2nd Bt
- Brigadier General Howard Clifton Brown (1868–1946), who represented Newbury as a member of parliament.
- Lieutenant-colonel Douglas Clifton Brown (1879–1958), who served as Speaker of the House of Commons from 1943 to 1951 and was elevated to the Peerage of the United Kingdom as the Viscount Ruffside in 1951.
- Vice Admiral Francis Clifton Brown (1874–1963)
- Mildred Clifton Brown (1876–1949), married Charles George Ashburner Nix, of Tilgate House in Crawley

Brown died on 5 January 1917.

=== Descendants ===
One of his grandsons, Geoffrey Clifton-Brown (1899–1983), followed him into Parliament, and his great-great-grandson, also Geoffrey Clifton-Brown (b. 1953), is currently serving in Parliament.

Parliament of the United Kingdom
Preceded by Robert Henry Hurst	Member of Parliament for Horsham; 1876 – 1880	Succeeded by Sir Henry Fletcher
