= Thomas L. Brown II =

U.S. Navy officer (1960–2021)

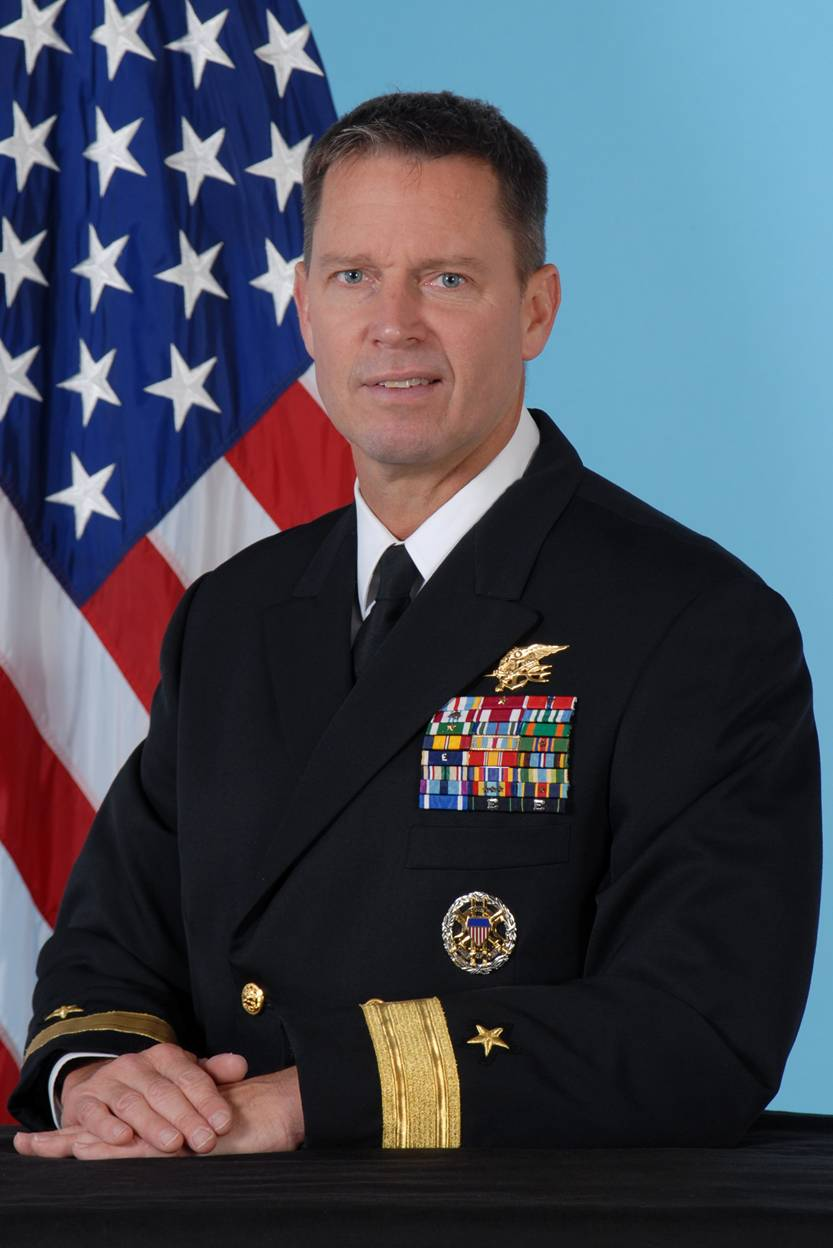
- Born: July 1, 1960; Michigan, U.S.
- Died: February 24, 2021 (aged 60); California, U.S.
- Burial place: Arlington National Cemetery
- Military career
- Allegiance: United States of America
- Branch: United States Navy
- Service years: 1983–2014
- Rank: Rear admiral
- Commands: Special Operations Command South
- Awards: Defense Superior Service Medal; Legion of Merit; Bronze Star Medal with Combat Distinguishing Device

Thomas Lee Brown II (July 1, 1960 – February 24, 2021) was a United States Navy officer and the first Navy officer to command Special Operations Command South, based in Homestead Joint Air Reserve Base, Florida.

== Early life and education ==
Brown was born in Michigan, but raised in Danbury, Connecticut, where his parents Thomas L. Brown and Marjorie G. Brown still reside. The elder Brown is a retired U.S. Navy Commander and Naval Aviator who flew the P-5 Marlin and P-3 Orion aircraft. After retiring from the military, Commander Brown was a pilot for Trans World Airlines. Rear Admiral Brown was commissioned as a Naval officer from the University of New Mexico's Naval Reserve Officer Training Corps (NROTC) in 1983.

Brown graduated Tau Beta Pi with a Bachelor of Science in Chemical Engineering, and is a distinguished graduate of the Paul H. Nitze School of Advanced International Studies (SAIS) of Johns Hopkins University, where he earned a Master of Arts in International Relations with a concentration in Latin American and Strategic Studies. He also holds a Master of Science degree in National Resource Strategy and the DoD Chief Information Officer Certificate from the National Defense University.

== Career ==
Brown volunteered for Basic Underwater Demolition/SEAL training and graduated with BUD/S class 125 in 1983. He completed Army Airborne School at Fort Benning prior to his assignment to SEAL Team FIVE in 1984. Following SEAL Tactical Training (STT) and completion of a six month probationary period, he received the 1130 designator as a Naval Special Warfare Officer, entitled to wear the Special Warfare insignia also known as "SEAL Trident". In 1987 he studied Spanish at the Defense Language Institute and then reported to SEAL Team ONE to serve as platoon commander and operations officer. Brown’s staff assignments include executive officer, SEAL Team EIGHT where he deployed as Naval Special Warfare Task Unit (NSWTU) commander NSWTU-Wasp under commander Amphibious Task Group 185.2; and then as commander NSWTU-America under CTF60. Brown commanded Naval Special Warfare Unit FOUR, Puerto Rico, under U.S. Southern Command from 1999-2001.

Brown’s other assignments include the Office of the Assistant Secretary of Defense for Special Operations and Low Intensity Conflict, United States Special Operations Command, and Navy section chief, U.S. Military Advisory Group El Salvador. In 2002 Brown reported to the Directorate of Operations of the Joint Staff, Deputy Directorate Special Operations, and served as the Global War on Terrorism branch chief until September 2005. He was then assigned as assistant chief of staff for Ops and Plans at Naval Special Warfare Command until June 2007, when he took command of Naval Special Warfare Group ONE from 2007 to 2009. Prior to commanding SOCSOUTH, Brown served as the deputy commander of Special Operations Command Europe. Currently Brown is employed by Knowledge Point and working in Abu Dhabi, UAE as well as CEO of Boston based investment firm, GVP Global Corporation.

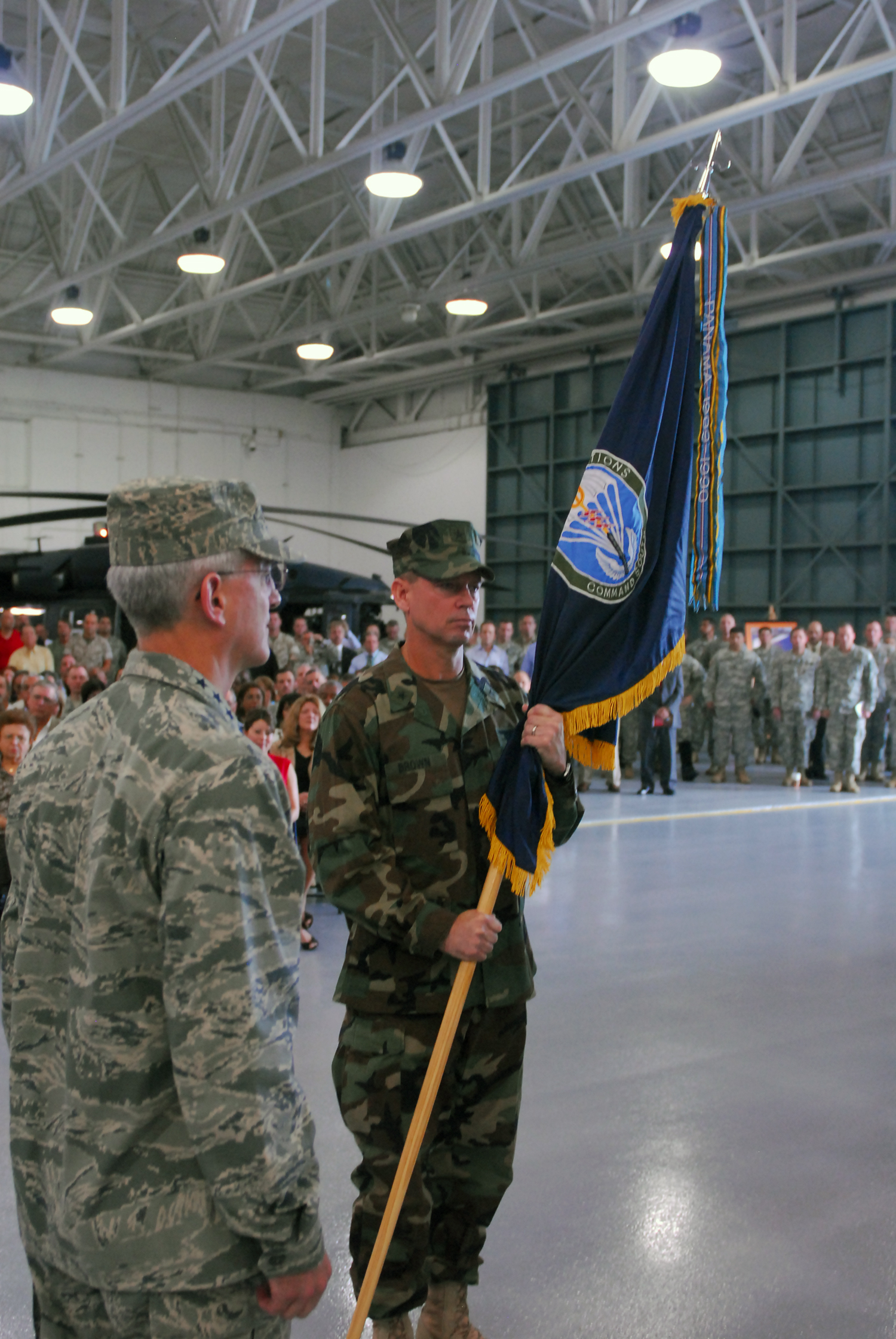
Brown taking command of SOCSOUTH on September 17, 2010

=== Taking command of Special Operations Command South ===
On Sept 17, 2010, Brown officially took charge of U.S. special operations forces in Latin America as the commander of United States Special Operations Command South at Homestead Air Reserve Base, Florida. The command is part of U.S. Southern Command, which is based in Miami and oversees U.S. military operations in Latin America and the Caribbean.

SOCSOUTH oversees Special Operations Forces including civil affairs and information support teams in Latin America and the Caribbean. The command manages some 300 special operations personnel within 15 countries. SOCSOUTH has a number of assigned forces including Charlie Company, 3rd Battalion of the 7th Special Forces Group; Naval Special Warfare Detachment South, and Charlie Company of the 160th Special Operations Aviation Regiment. One of Brown's first duties as SOCSOUTH commander was to host the Combating Terrorism Fellowship Program (CTFP) Conference in Miami, FL on Sept 20-24,2010.

RDML Brown retired after 30 years of service completing a nearly two year assignment as the military deputy of the National Geospatial Agency (NGA), Springfield, VA; one of the most prominent members of the US Intelligence Community (IC) as well as serving SECDEF as a Combat Support Agency.

== Death ==
Brown died in California on February 24, 2021, at the age of 60. He was buried at Arlington National Cemetery on December 16, 2022.

== Awards and decorations ==
Among Brown's military awards and decorations are the following:

- Defense Superior Service Medal (2)
- Legion of Merit (2)
- Bronze Star with Valor Device
- Defense Meritorious Service Medal (2)
- Meritorious Service Medal
- Joint Service Commendation Medal
- Navy Commendation Medal (second award)
- Joint Service Achievement Medal
- Navy Achievement Medal (second award)
- Combat Action Ribbon
- Joint Meritorious Unit Award
- Navy Meritorious Unit Commendation
- Navy E Ribbon
- Southwest Asia Service Ribbon
- Armed Forces Expeditionary Medal
- Humanitarian Service Ribbon
- NATO Meritorious Service Medal

Badges

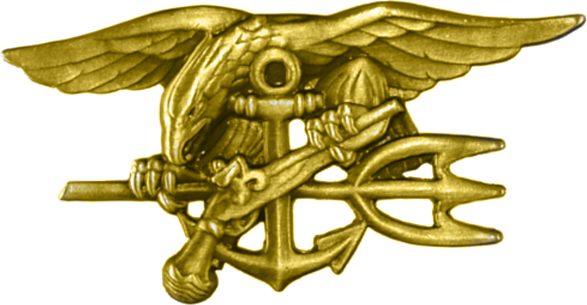
- United States Navy Special Warfare insignia
