= William Vesey-FitzGerald, 2nd Baron FitzGerald and Vesey =

British politician (1783–1843)

The Right Honourable The Lord FitzGerald and Vesey PC PC (Ire) FRS FSA
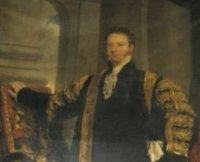

President of the Board of Trade
- In office 11 June 1828 – 2 February 1830
- Monarch: George IV
- Prime Minister: The Duke of Wellington
- Preceded by: Charles Grant
- Succeeded by: John Charles Herries

President of the Board of Control
- In office 23 October 1841 – 17 May 1843
- Monarch: Victoria
- Prime Minister: Sir Robert Peel, Bt
- Preceded by: The Lord Ellenborough
- Succeeded by: The Earl of Ripon

Personal details
- Party: Tory
- Born: 24 July 1783
- Died: 11 May 1843 (aged 59); Belgrave Square, London
- Education: Christ Church, Oxford
- Children: Sir William Vesey-FitzGerald (son)
- Parents: James Fitzgerald (father); Catherine, 1st Baroness FitzGerald and Vesey (mother)

William Vesey-FitzGerald, 2nd Baron FitzGerald and Vesey, PC, PC (Ire), FRS, FSA (24 July 1783 – 11 May 1843) was an Anglo-Irish statesman. A Tory, he served in the governments of Lord Wellington and Robert Peel, but is best known for his defeat in the 1828 County Clare by-election, hastening Catholic emancipation across the United Kingdom of Great Britain and Ireland.

== Background and education ==
FitzGerald was the elder son of James FitzGerald and Catherine, 1st Baroness FitzGerald and Vesey, daughter of Reverend Henry Vesey. He was educated at Christ Church, Oxford. Through his father he was of both Old English and Gaelic Irish descent.

== Political career ==
FitzGerald first entered parliament in 1808 as the member for Ennis (succeeding his father), a seat he held until October 1812, when he was replaced by his father, and again between January 1813 and 1818. He was implicated in the scandal involving the Duke of York and his mistress Mary Anne Clarke, but after bringing valuable evidence of the case to the courts he was rewarded when he was appointed a Lord of the Irish Treasury and sworn of the Irish Privy Council in 1810. In 1812 he was admitted to the British Privy Council and made a Lord of the Treasury in England, Chancellor of the Exchequer of Ireland and First Lord of the Irish Treasury. He held the Irish offices until they were merged with the English treasury in 1816. In 1820 FitzGerald was returned to Parliament for County Clare. In 1820 he was appointed Ambassador to Sweden. He tried to make Charles XIV John, the king of Sweden, repay the large sums of money given to him during the Napoleonic Wars, but this was to no avail and he returned to Britain in 1823. He served as Paymaster of the Forces under successively Lord Liverpool, George Canning and Lord Goderich between 1826 and 1828.

In 1828 the Duke of Wellington appointed him President of the Board of Trade and Treasurer of the Navy. This required him to contest the Clare constituency once again, but he was defeated. The election was noteworthy in terms of Irish history because it led directly to Catholic Emancipation spearheaded by his successor, Daniel O'Connell as a result of his win. However, FitzGerald managed to get elected for Newport in 1829, and served as President of the Board of Trade and Treasurer of the Navy until February 1830, when he resigned. He briefly represented Lostwithiel in 1830 and then Ennis from 1831 until 1835.

FitzGerald succeeded his mother as second Baron FitzGerald and Vesey in 1832. As this was an Irish peerage it did not entitle him to a seat in the House of Lords. However, in 1835 he was created Baron FitzGerald, of Desmond and of Clan Gibbon in the County of Cork, in the Peerage of the United Kingdom, and was able to take a seat in the House of Lords. He again held office as President of the Board of Control under Sir Robert Peel between 1841 and 1843. Apart from his political career FitzGerald was Lord Lieutenant of County Clare from 1831 to 1843, a trustee of the British Museum, President of the Royal Institute of the Architects of Ireland from its foundation in 1839 to 1843, and a Fellow of the Society of Antiquaries.

== Personal life ==
Lord FitzGerald and Vesey died in May 1843, aged 59. He was unmarried and on his death the barony of 1835 became extinct. He was succeeded in the Irish title by his younger brother, Henry. Lord FitzGerald and Vesey's illegitimate son Sir William Vesey-FitzGerald became a successful Conservative politician.

Parliament of the United Kingdom
Preceded by James FitzGerald	Member of Parliament for Ennis; 1808 – 1812	Succeeded by James FitzGerald
Preceded by James FitzGerald	Member of Parliament for Ennis; 1813 – 1818	Succeeded by Spencer Perceval
Preceded by Sir Edward O'Brien, Bt; Augustine FitzGerald	Member of Parliament for County Clare; 1818 – 1828; With: Sir Edward O'Brien, Bt 1818–1826; Lucius O'Brien 1826–1828	Succeeded by Lucius O'Brien; Daniel O'Connell
Preceded by Jonathan Raine; Hon. Charles Greatheed Bertie Percy	Member of Parliament for Newport (Cornwall); 1829 – 1830; With: Jonathan Raine	Succeeded by Jonathan Raine; John Doherty
Preceded by Viscount Valletort; Edward Cust	Member of Parliament for Lostwithiel; 1830; With: Edward Cust	Succeeded by Edward Cust; Viscount Valletort
Preceded by William Smith O'Brien	Member of Parliament for Ennis; 1831 – 1832	Succeeded by Sir Augustine Fitzgerald, Bt
Political offices
Preceded by Hon. William Wellesley-Pole	Chancellor of the Irish Exchequer; 1812–1816	Succeeded by Nicholas Vansittart
Preceded by Charles Long	Paymaster of the Forces; 1826–1828	Succeeded by John Calcraft
Preceded by Charles Grant	President of the Board of Trade; 1828–1830	Succeeded by John Charles Herries
Preceded by Charles Grant	Treasurer of the Navy; 1828–1830	Succeeded by Thomas Frankland Lewis
Preceded by The Lord Ellenborough	President of the Board of Control; 1841–1843	Succeeded by The Earl of Ripon
Diplomatic posts
Preceded by The Viscount Strangford	Ambassador to Sweden; 1820–1823	Succeeded by Sir Benjamin Bloomfield
Honorary titles
New office	Lord Lieutenant of Clare; 1831–1843	Succeeded by Sir Lucius O'Brien, Bt
Professional and academic associations
New office	President of the Royal Institute of the Architects of Ireland; 1839–1843	Succeeded by Richard Wingfield, 6th Viscount Powerscourt
Peerage of Ireland
Preceded by Catherine FitzGerald	Baron FitzGerald and Vesey; 1832–1843	Succeeded by Henry Vesey-FitzGerald
Peerage of the United Kingdom
New creation	Baron FitzGerald; 1835–1843	Extinct
