= F. Taylor Brown =

F. Taylor Brown (August 11, 1925 – July 11, 2011) was a rear admiral in the United States Navy.

Brown was born Francis Taylor Brown in Ashland, Wisconsin. He attended Marquette University and George Washington University. Brown died following an automobile accident in Little Rock, Arkansas, on July 11, 2011.

== Career ==
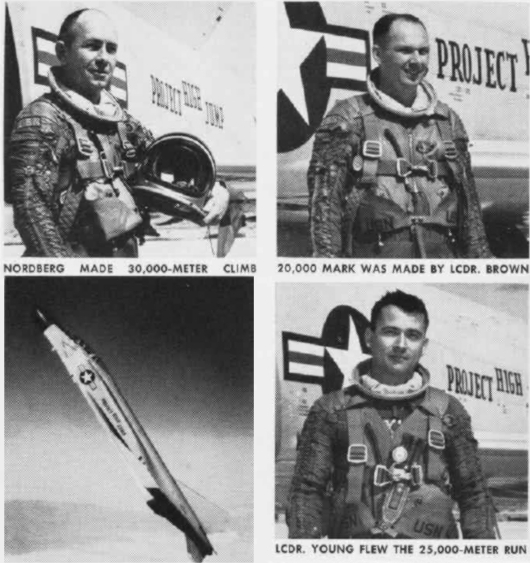
Three pilots testing Phantom II in 1962, Brown in the top right corner. In the bottom right corner future famous astronaut J. Young is pictured

Brown originally enlisted in the United States Navy Reserve during World War II. Following the war, he was commissioned an officer and designated a Naval Aviator. In 1948, he transferred to the Regular Navy. That year, he also won the Bendix Trophy in the jet division. From 1958 to 1959, he served with Attack Squadron 174. After attending the Naval War College, Brown was stationed at the Naval Air Test Center. In 1962, he set world record when he reached 65,000 feet in two minutes, fifty-eight point five seconds from a standing start while piloting a McDonnell Douglas F-4 Phantom II.

During the Vietnam War, he commanded Carrier Air Wing Nine, stationed aboard the USS Enterprise (CVN-65), and as executive officer of the USS Oriskany (CV-34). After attending the National War College and taking a sabbatical from the Navy, Brown returned to service in the Vietnam War as commanding officer of the USS Guadalupe (AO-32). In 1970, he was assigned to The Pentagon as deputy electromagnetic coordinator of the Navy. From 1971 to 1972, he served as commanding officer of the USS Inchon (LPH-12). He was then deputy director of operations, Joint Chiefs of Staff and the National Military Command Center in The Pentagon. After holding command of the Naval Air Test Center from 1974 to 1976, Brown served as defense attaché at the Embassy of the United States, London from 1976 to 1978. Brown became deputy director for international programs in the Office of the Assistant Secretary of Defense for Research and Engineering before retiring from active duty in 1978.

Awards he received include the Distinguished Flying Cross with service star and the Air Medal with service star.
