= Baron FitzGerald and Vesey =

Baron FitzGerald and Vesey, of Clare and of Inchicronan in County Clare, was a title in the Peerage of Ireland. It was created on 31 July 1826 for Catherine FitzGerald, with the remainder to her heirs male by her husband James FitzGerald. James Fitzgerald was a member of the Irish House of Commons for many years and also represented Ennis in the House of Commons of the United Kingdom. He refused a peerage in 1826 and the honour was instead bestowed upon his wife. Lady Fitzgerald and Vesey was the daughter of Reverend Henry Vesey. She was succeeded by her eldest son, the second Baron. He was a prominent Tory politician and notably served as President of the Board of Trade between 1841 and 1843. On 10 January 1835 he was created Baron FitzGerald, of Desmond and of Clan Gibbon in the County of York, in the Peerage of the United Kingdom. He was unmarried and on his death in 1843 the barony of 1835 became extinct. He was succeeded in the Irish barony by his younger brother, the third Baron and Dean of Kilmore. The latter had no sons and on his death in 1860 this title also became extinct.

Sir William Vesey-FitzGerald, the illegitimate son of the second Baron, was a politician.

== Barons FitzGerald and Vesey (1826) ==
- Catherine FitzGerald, 1st Baroness FitzGerald and Vesey (1759–1832)
- William Vesey-FitzGerald, 2nd Baron FitzGerald and Vesey, 1st Baron FitzGerald (1783–1843)
- Henry Vesey-FitzGerald, 3rd Baron FitzGerald and Vesey (c. 1786–1860)
