= Matthew Joseph Kenny =

Irish lawyer and Nationalist politician

Matthew Joseph Kenny KC (1 February 1861 – 8 December 1942) was an Irish lawyer and Nationalist politician from County Clare. He was elected to the United Kingdom House of Commons at the age of 21, qualified as a barrister whilst still a member of parliament (MP), and later became a judge in the Irish Free State.

== Early life ==
Kenny was born at Freaghcastle, near Milltown Malbay in County Clare, to the solicitor Michael Kenny and his wife Bridget, née Frost. The family were major landholders.

He attended Ennis College, an Erasmus Smith school. Thom's Irish Who's Who states that he attended Stonyhurst, and Trinity College Dublin,. This seems to be incorrect and all other contemporary sources confirm that he in fact attended Ennis School and Queen's Univ. While serving at as an MP, he was called to the bar at Gray's Inn in 1886 and at the King's Inns, Dublin, in 1889. In 1899 he went bankrupt and his estates were sold off. He became a King's Counsel in 1914.

== Political career ==
Kenny was just 21 years of age when he was selected as the Home Rule League candidate for a by-election for Ennis in November 1882.

Ennis's Home Rule MP James Lysaght Finegan had resigned his seat on 15 September 1882, owing to ill health. According to Kieran Sheedy's The Clare Elections (p. 269),

the Home Rule party candidate was Matthew J. Kenny who was selected at the request of local electors and with the agreement of Parnell. He was the son of Matthew [sic, but impossible!] Kenny, Freagh Castle and a nephew of Fr Matt Kenny. (founder member of Clare Farmers association and later active in the Land League movement while PP of Scarriff) and he was working in Manchester where he was president of the Irish Labour League. [...] Matthew (M.J.) Kenny arrived in Ennis accompanied by John Redmond, the Home Rule member for New Ross, and they addressed a crowd from a window in Carmody's Hotel before attending a nomination meeting which was chaired by Edward Finucane. [...] Polling took place on Tuesday 14 November and the Miltown Brass Band was in attendance from an early hour to support Kenny. The election booths were open from 8 a.m. to 5 p.m. and the sheriff declared the result before six o clock: KENNY 136 R. W. CAREY REEVES 95. Spoiled votes 3.'

According to Hugh Weir's Houses of Clare (1999, p. 131), Kenny was the youngest Member of Parliament at the time.

The Redistribution of Seats Act 1885 abolished Ennis's separate parliamentary representation, with effect from the 1885 general election. The former two-seat County Clare constituency was divided for parliamentary purposes into the new single-member constituencies of East Clare and West Clare with one member to be elected in each division. Kenny did not contest either of the new Clare seats, standing instead in Mid Tyrone, where he was elected. However he continued to interest himself in political developments in Clare.

Kenny held the Mid-Tyrone seat from 1885 to 1895. When the Irish Parliamentary Party split in 1890, he opposed Parnell, joining the Irish National Federation. Indeed, he suffered a black eye at the hands of a Parnellite member Pierce Mahony.

Kenny retired from political life in 1895 and apart from his activities as a breeder of pedigree horses, cattle and sheep devoted himself to the practice of law.

In 1887, he married Elizabeth Robertson Stewart, daughter of W. R. Stewart, of Lairsill or Lairdshill, Aberdeenshire. They had two sons and two daughters.

He was appointed Senior Crown Prosecutor for County Kerry in 1916, and was appointed circuit court judge for Cork City and County in 1925, retiring in 1933. Maurice Healy notes that his term of office had been extended due to the universal respect in which he was held.

The Irish Times of 6 October 1941 published Matthew Kenny's memories of Charles Stewart Parnell to mark the 50th anniversary of the latter's death.

Matthew Kenny, initially a Parnellite MP, was a cousin of William Kenny, a Liberal Unionist MP. The two cousins' tenures on opposite sides in the House of Commons overlapped between 1892 and 1895. Both were descended from Mathias Kenny of Treanmanagh, Kilmurry Ibricken and Dysert, Dysert, Co. Clare.

Maurice Healy in his memoirs describes Matthew Kenny with great affection as a judge of exceptional dignity and integrity who was universally liked and respected; his fault, if it was a fault, was the severity of his sentences in criminal cases.

Parliament of the United Kingdom
Preceded by James Lysaght Finigan	Member of Parliament for Ennis; 1882 – 1885	Constituency abolished
New constituency	Member of Parliament for Mid-Tyrone; 1885 – 1895	Succeeded by George Murnaghan
