= John FitzGerald, Baron FitzGerald =

Irish judge and politician (1816–1889)

The Right Honourable The Lord FitzGerald PC, PC (Ire)
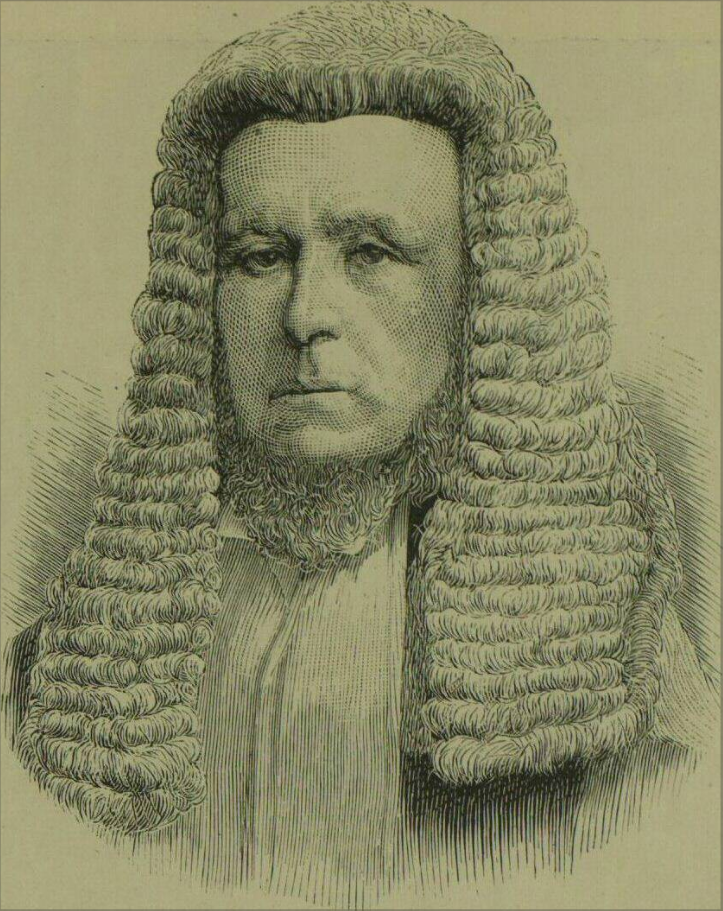

Lord of Appeal in Ordinary
- In office 1882–1889

Personal details
- Born: John David FitzGerald

John David FitzGerald, Baron FitzGerald, PC, PC (Ire) (1 May 1816 – 16 October 1889) was an Irish judge and Liberal politician.

== Background ==
Born in Dublin, he was the son of the merchant David FitzGerald and his wife Catherine, eldest daughter of David Leahy. His sister Kate was married to Charles Robert Barry and his youngest sister Emily to Denis Caulfield Heron. FitzGerald was educated privately and was called to the bar by King's Inns in 1838. In 1870, he received an Honorary Doctorate of Laws by the University of Dublin.

== Career ==
FitzGerald became a Queen's Counsel in 1847, and was a judge of the Munster circuit. He entered the House of Commons in 1852, sitting for Ennis the next eight years. In 1855, FitzGerald was first elected a bencher, then nominated Solicitor-General for Ireland. He became Attorney-General for Ireland a year later, on which appointment he was sworn of the Privy Council of Ireland. FitzGerald held the former post until 1858 and after a break for a year, again until 1860, when he was appointed Judge on the Court of Queen's Bench (Ireland). On 23 June 1882, he was created a Lord of Appeal in Ordinary with the life peerage title of Baron FitzGerald, of Kilmarnock, in the County of Dublin. Six days later, he was additionally sworn of the Privy Council of the United Kingdom, entitling him to sit on the Judicial Committee.

=== Judgments ===
- Foakes v Beer [1884] UKHL 1, [1881-85] All ER Rep 106, (1884) 9 App Cas 605; 54 LJQB 130; 51 LT 833; 33 WR 233 - a leading case from the House of Lords on the legal concept of consideration

== Family ==
In 1846, he married Rose, second daughter of John Donohoe, and had by her three sons. She died in 1850, and FitzGerald remarried Hon. Jane Matilda Mary, daughter of Lieutenant-Colonel Arthur Francis Southwell and Mary Ann Agnes Dillon, and sister of Thomas Southwell, 4th Viscount Southwell. By his second wife, he had four sons and six daughters. The former Conservative politician Amber Rudd is his great-great-granddaughter.

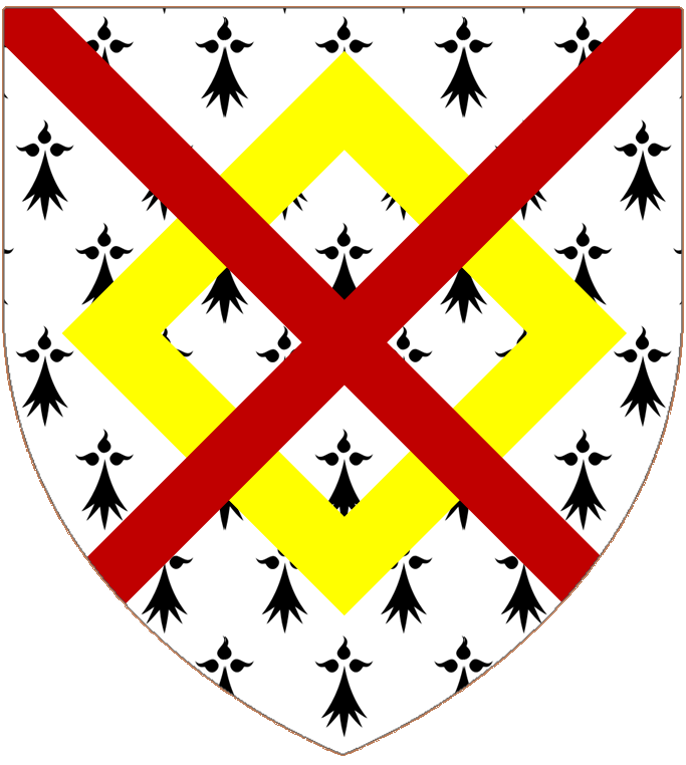
The arms of Fitzgerald: Ermine a Mascle Or over all a Saltire Gules

Parliament of the United Kingdom
Preceded by James Patrick O'Gorman Mahon	Member of Parliament for Ennis; 1852 – 1860	Succeeded by William Stacpoole
Legal offices
Preceded by William Keogh	Solicitor-General for Ireland; 1855 – 1856	Succeeded by Jonathan Christian
Preceded by William Keogh	Attorney-General for Ireland; 1856 – 1858	Succeeded by James Whiteside
Preceded by James Whiteside	Attorney-General for Ireland; 1859 – 1860	Succeeded by Rickard Deasy
