= James Lysaght Finegan =

Irish barrister, soldier, merchant and politician

James Lysaght Finegan or Finigan (1844–8 September 1900) was an Irish barrister, soldier, merchant and politician. He was educated by the Congregation of Christian Brothers and described as an "Anti-clericalist", and with his family engaged in the tea trade, while supporting the Nationalist cause. In 1867 a nationalist called Michael Breslin was forced to leave Ireland, and only avoided arrest thanks to documents given to him by Finegan certifying him as a tea trader.

Finegan later served in the French Foreign Legion during the Franco-Prussian War, leaving in 1871 at the conclusion of the war. In the 1879 by-election in Ennis he was proposed as an alternative candidate to that of the Home Rule League by Charles Stewart Parnell; he won by only six votes, out of 247 electors. His service in parliament was brief; he resigned in 1882.

Parliament of the United Kingdom
Preceded by William Stacpoole	Member of Parliament for Ennis; 1879–1882	Succeeded by Matthew Joseph Kenny
