= Francis Clifton Brown =

Royal Navy vice-admiral

Vice-Admiral Francis Clifton Brown CB CMG
- Brown in 1917
- Born: 10 July 1874; Lower Beeding, Horsham District, West Sussex
- Died: 6 September 1963 (aged 89); Pusey, Oxfordshire
- Military career
- Service years: 1889–1922
- Rank: Vice-Admiral

Vice-Admiral Francis Clifton Brown CB CMG (10 July 1874 – 6 September 1963) was an officer of the Royal Navy.

== Early life ==
Brown was born 10 July 1874 in Lower Beeding in the Horsham District of West Sussex, England. He was the son of James Clifton Brown and Amelia Rowe and during his childhood the family lived in Holmbush House. He was educated at Cheam School.

== Navy career ==
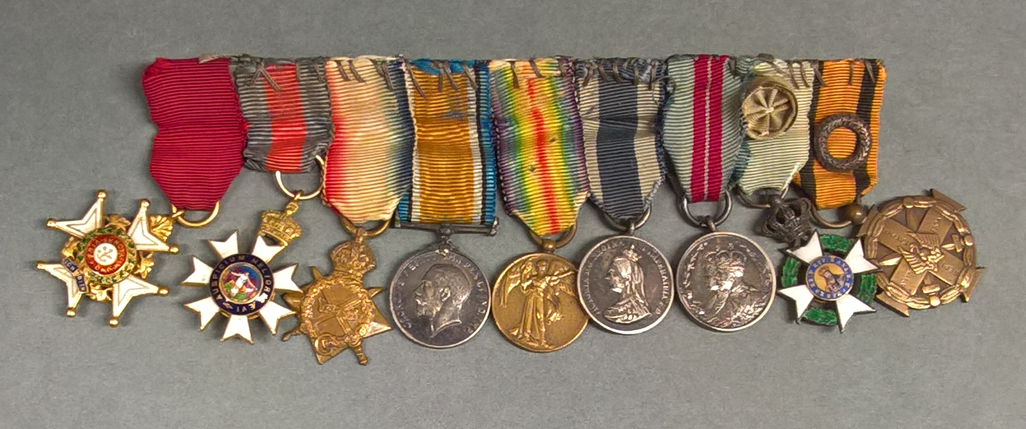
Vice-admiral Francis Clifton Brown (1874-1963) medals

Brown trained at the Britannia Royal Naval College and was appointed to HMS Dreadnought in 1890. On 23 April 1895 he was promoted to Sub-lieutenant and then 14 October 1894 to Lieutenant. In April 1900 he was posted as gunnery lieutenant on the cruiser HMS Argonaut, commissioned for service on the China station. Four years later on 31 December 1904, he was promoted to the rank of Commander. In January 1910, he was appointed to command the Apollo-class 2nd class protected cruiser HMS Thetis. On 1 July 1912, he was promoted to the Captain.

During World War I Brown commanded HMS Skirmisher and HMS Edgar and was mentioned in despatches for his work. From 1917 to 1919 he was appointment as Head of the Naval Mission to Greece. On 1 July 1922 he was promoted to Rear admiral and then later promoted to the rank of Vice admiral (retired) on 3 August 1927. Brown received the C.M.G., the Order of the Redeemer and C.B.

== Retirement ==
In retirement Brown remained active in public life. During 1931, he served as the High Sheriff of Berkshire and was on the governing body of Abingdon School from 1929 and was the Chairman of the Governors from 1944 to 1958.
