= Augustine FitzGerald =

Irish politician

Augustine FitzGerald (c.1765 – 4 December 1834) was an Irish politician. He was Lieutenant-Colonel of the Clare Militia from 11 May 1803, Member of Parliament (MP) for County Clare from 1808 to 1818, and MP for Ennis briefly in early 1832.

Baronetage of the United Kingdom
New creation	Baronet (of Newmarket on Fergus); 1822–1834	Succeeded by William Fitzgerald
