= Henry Chowne =

English politician

Henry Chowne (c 1613 – 1668) was an English politician who sat in the House of Commons at various times between 1659 and 1668.

Chowne was the son of Thomas Chowne of Place House, Alfriston and his wife Rachel Campion, daughter of William Campion of Combwell, Goudhurst, Kent. He was apprenticed to the father of Sir Robert Cordell, and by 1639 was acting as his factor at Smyrna. In 1651, he succeeded his nephew William to the family estate, including property in Horsham. He held stock in the East India Company, and later arranged for his son to take a post at Surat. In 1659, he was elected Member of Parliament for Horsham in the Third Protectorate Parliament, but was involved in a double return and his election was declared void. He was commissioner for assessment for Sussex from August 1660 until his death. In 1661 he was elected MP for Horsham in the Cavalier Parliament. He was a J.P. from 1662 until his death.

Chowne died at the age of about 54 and was buried at Horsham on 22 October 1668.

Chowne married Barbara Middleton daughter of Thomas Middleton of Horsham on 26 April 1642 and had seven sons and a daughter. His grandson Thomas Chowne was elected MP for Seaford in 1702 and 1710.

Parliament of England
Preceded by Not represented in Second Protectorate Parliament	Member of Parliament for Horsham; 1659; With: William Freeman	Succeeded by William Freeman; John Fagg
