= Henry Boteler (fl. 1386–1397) =

English politician

Henry Boteler (fl. 1386–1397), of Horsham, Sussex, was an English politician.

He was a Member (MP) of the Parliament of England for Lancashire in 1386, January 1390, 1391, 1395 and September 1397.
