= Julius Ingram =

American politician (1832–1917)

- Born: May 31, 1832; Saratoga County, New York, U.S.
- Died: May 13, 1917 (aged 84)
- Resting place: Lake View Cemetery, Eau Claire, Wisconsin, U.S.
- Occupation: Politician
- Political party: Republican Party
- Spouses: Mary Linda Van Wagenen; Ella Moffat
- Children: 4
- Relatives: Orrin Henry Ingram (brother); Erskine B. Ingram (nephew); Orrin Henry Ingram Sr. (great-nephew); E. Bronson Ingram II (great-great-nephew); Frederic B. Ingram (great-great-nephew); Martha R. Ingram (great-great-niece-in-law); Ingrid Goude (great-great-niece-in-law); David Bronson Ingram (great-great-great-nephew); Orrin H. Ingram II (great-great=great-nephew); John R. Ingram (great-great-great-nephew)

Julius G. Ingram (May 31, 1832 – May 13, 1917) was a member of the Wisconsin State Assembly.

== Early life ==
Julius Ingram was born on May 31, 1832, in Saratoga County, New York. His brother, Orrin Henry Ingram, was a lumber baron.

== Career ==
Ingram was a member of the Assembly in 1878 and 1879. He was a Republican.

Ingram served on the board of trustees of the Eau Claire asylum.

== Personal life ==
He first married Mary Linda Van Wagenen. They had three children before her death on September 13, 1879. Ingram later married Ella Moffat on June 24, 1886. They had one child. Ingram was a Congregationalist.

== Death and legacy ==
Ingram died at his home on May 13, 1917. He was buried at the Lake View Cemetery, Eau Claire, Wisconsin, U.S.

His nephew, Erskine B. Ingram, became a high-profile businessman. His descendants are the owners of Ingram Industries and its subsidiaries, which include Ingram Barge Company, Ingram Content Group, Ingram Entertainment Holdings Inc., Ingram Micro and Lightning Source.
