= Martha Rivers Ingram =

American billionaire and business executive (1935–2026)

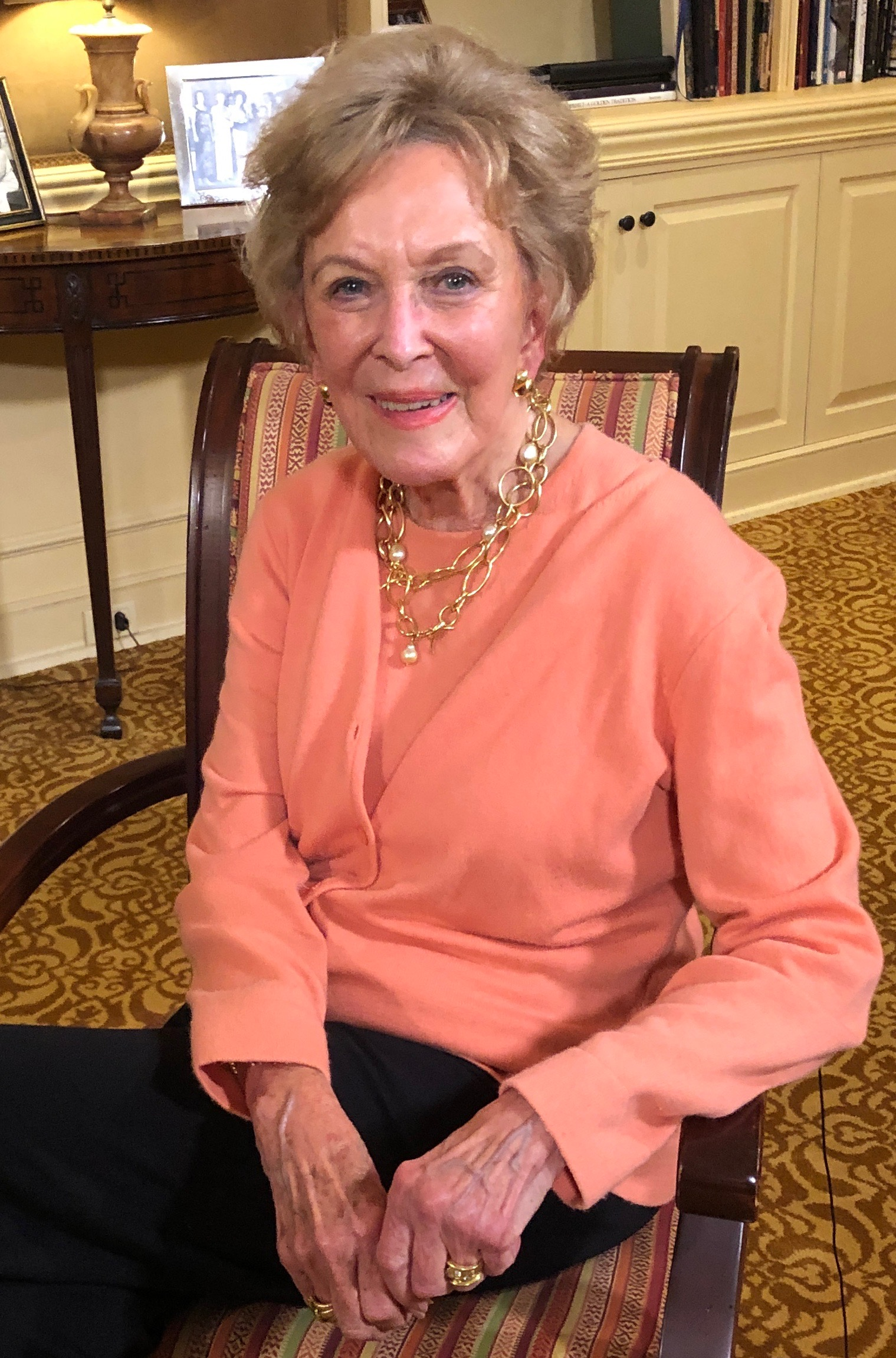
- Ingram in 2020
- Born: Martha Robinson Rivers; August 20, 1935; Charleston, South Carolina, U.S.
- Died: August 6, 2026 (aged 90); Nashville, Tennessee, U.S.
- Education: Vassar College
- Occupation: Businesswoman
- Known for: Philanthropist, arts patron
- Title: Former chairman, Ingram Industries; Former chairman, Vanderbilt University Board of Trust
- Spouse: E. Bronson Ingram (m. 1958; died 1995)
- Children: 4, including Orrin H. Ingram II; John R. Ingram; David Bronson Ingram
- Relatives: Frederic B. Ingram (brother-in-law); Ingrid Goude (sister-in-law); Sarah LeBrun Ingram (daughter-in-law)

Martha Robinson Rivers Ingram (August 20, 1935 – August 6, 2026) was an American billionaire businesswoman and philanthropist. In 1995, Ingram succeeded her late husband as chairman and chief executive officer (CEO) of Ingram Industries, one of America's largest privately held companies. She was the co-author of three books, including two biographies and a history of the performing arts in Nashville, Tennessee.

== Early life ==
Martha Robinson Rivers was born on August 20, 1935 in Charleston, South Carolina, the daughter of John Minott Rivers and Martha Elizabeth Robinson. She was educated at Ashley Hall in Charleston. She graduated from Vassar College with a Bachelor of Arts in history in 1957.

== Career ==
Upon graduation, she found employment at WCSC-AM/FM and WCSC-TV, a radio and television station, respectively, owned by her father. While at Vassar College, she had also worked as a classical music disc jockey, using the pseudonym "Elizabeth Crawford".

Ingram was appointed by her husband as director of public affairs at Ingram Industries in 1979. After her husband's death in 1995, she became chairman and CEO. Her involvement in civic and nonprofit organizations preceded her leadership of Ingram Industries. By the time she was 63, Forbes named her 24th wealthiest person in America with an estimated $4.7 billion net worth.

She was the co-author of three books. Her first book was a biography of her husband published in 2001, six years after his death. In her second book, published in 2004, Ingram wrote about the performing arts scene in Nashville during the Antebellum era. She argued that it was destroyed by the American Civil War and that it never fully recovered. Her third book, published in 2006, was a biography of Kenneth Schermerhorn, the music director of the Nashville Symphony.

=== Philanthropy ===
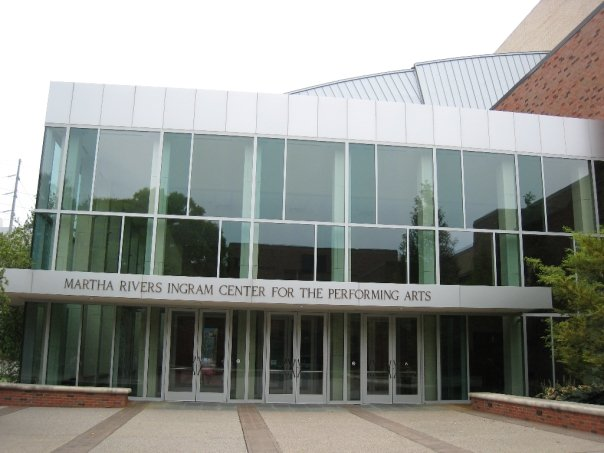
The Martha Rivers Ingram Center for the Performing Arts

Ingram was a co-founder of the Schermerhorn Symphony Center which opened in 2005. She was a longtime supporter of the performing arts in Nashville and held leadership or board roles with a number of cultural organizations, including the Tennessee Performing Arts Center, Nashville Symphony Association, Tennessee Repertory Theatre, Nashville Opera, and Nashville Ballet. She also served as a board member of Spoleto Festival USA and as chairman of the board for three years.

She was an early supporter of efforts to establish Nashville as a regional cultural center. By 2000, the Tennessee Performing Arts Center had an endowment of more than $20 million, supporting arts programming that had reached more than one million Tennessee children.

Ingram served as Chairman of the Board of Trust of Vanderbilt University in Nashville. The Vanderbilt Blair School of Music has been the recipient of $300 million of Ingram company stock.

She was named in Business Week as the 50th most generous philanthropist, for her donations from 2000 to 2004. In 2006 she was honored by the Community Foundation of Middle Tennessee as the 2006 recipient of the 13th Annual Joe Kraft Humanitarian Award for her philanthropic efforts. She received the Eli & Edythe Broad Award for Philanthropy in the Arts.

Ingram was a member of the Junior League of Nashville, TN, and served on the board of Trustees when it opened the Junior League Convalescent Home in the Children's Regional Medical Center at Vanderbilt Children's Hospital in 1972. She was also the recipient of the Mary Harriman Community Leadership Award of Junior League International, Inc. in 1999.

Her involvement with the Junior League extended beyond Nashville. She participated as a Provisional in the Junior Leagues of Charleston, South Carolina, New Orleans, and Nashville before becoming an Active member of the Junior League of Nashville. Her Junior League experience formed part of her early civic and nonprofit leadership, preceding her later leadership of Ingram Industries.

== Personal life and death ==
On October 4, 1958, she married E. Bronson Ingram II (1931–1995) at St. Philip's Episcopal Church in Charleston, South Carolina. Her husband was the son of business magnate Orrin Henry Ingram, Sr., grandson of Erskine B. Ingram, and great-grandson of Orrin Henry Ingram. They had three sons and a daughter:

- Orrin H. Ingram II (born 1960), the CEO of Ingram Industries and the chairman of Ingram Barge Company.
- John R. Ingram (born c. 1961), the chairman of the Ingram Content Group, Lightning Source, and Ingram Industries.
- David Bronson Ingram (born c. 1962), the chairman and president of Ingram Entertainment.
- Robin Ingram Patton.

Ingram died on August 6, 2026, at the age of 90.

== Political activity ==
In 2015, Ingram donated to Democratic candidate Megan Barry's campaign to become the new Mayor of Nashville.

== Awards and honors ==
- 1999, South Carolina Business Hall of Fame
- 1999, Junior Achievement National Business Hall of Fame
- 1999, Mary Harriman Community Leadership Award of Junior League International, Inc.
- 2004, Golden Plate Award of the American Academy of Achievement presented by Awards Council member Naomi Judd
- 2006, Joe Kraft Humanitarian Award, Community Foundation of Middle Tennessee
- 2017, Music City Walk of Fame

== Works ==
- Rivers Ingram, Martha (2001). E. Bronson Ingram: Complete These Unfinished Tasks of Mine. Franklin, Tennessee: Hillsboro Press. ISBN 9781577362166. OCLC 48551547.
- Rivers Ingram, Martha; Kellogg, D. B. (2004). Apollo's Struggle: A Performing Arts Odyssey in the Athens of the South, Nashville, Tennessee. Franklin, Tennessee: Hillsboro Press. ISBN 9781577363101. OCLC 55675624.
- Rivers Ingram, Martha; Kellogg, D. B. (2006). Kenneth Schermerhorn: He Will Always Be the Music. Nashville, Tennessee: Nashville Symphony Association. OCLC 73171322.
