= Orrin H. Ingram II =

American businessperson

- Born: July 5, 1960 (age 66)
- Education: Vanderbilt University
- Occupations: Businessman, philanthropist
- Children: Orrin H. Hank Ingram III; Aaron Forest Barrett; Virginia Ingram
- Parent(s): E. Bronson Ingram II; Martha R. Ingram
- Relatives: Orrin Henry Ingram (great-great-grandfather); Julius Ingram (great-great-great-uncle); Erskine B. Ingram (great-grandfather); Frederic B. Ingram (uncle); Ingrid Goude (aunt by marriage); David Bronson Ingram (brother); John R. Ingram (brother); Sarah LeBrun Ingram (sister-in-law); Orrin Henry Ingram Sr.

Orrin H. Ingram II (born July 5, 1960) is an American heir, businessman, philanthropist and polo player. He is the chief executive officer (CEO) of Ingram Industries and the chairman of Ingram Barge Company.

== Early life ==
Orrin H. Ingram II was born on July 5, 1960. His late father was E. Bronson Ingram II and his mother is Martha R. Ingram. His brothers are David Bronson Ingram, CEO of Ingram Entertainment, and John R. Ingram, CEO of Ingram Book Group. His sister is Robin Ingram Patton. His paternal grandfather five times removed, David Ingram, was an immigrant from Leeds, England. His paternal great-great-grandfather, also Orrin Henry Ingram, was a lumber baron in Eau Claire, Wisconsin and early invested in Friedrich Weyerhäuser's timber investments, later known as the Weyerhaeuser Corporation.

Ingram received a B.A. from Vanderbilt University in 1982.

== Business career ==
Ingram started his career at Ingram Materials Company and Ingram Barge Company. He has been the President of Ingram Industries since 1996, and its CEO since 1999. He has served on the boards of eSkye Solutions, Ingram Micro, Ingram Barge Company, SunTrust Banks, Coca-Cola Enterprises, The Krystal Company, FirstBank, and the United States Chamber of Commerce. He has served on the Strategic Advisory Boards of SunCom and Tennessee Valley Ventures. In July 2011, he sold Ingram Materials Company to Pine Bluff Sand. He has sat on the Boards of the United States Chamber of Commerce and the Nashville Area Chamber of Commerce.

== Polo and hunting ==
Ingram is a former Chairman of the United States Polo Association and the Polo Training Foundation, where he still serves as an Honorary Director. He is a member of the Nashville Polo Club. In 1996, he played on the American team in South Africa with James Armstrong, Adolfo Cambiaso and Tod Rackley. He has organized charity polo games at his RiverView Farm in Franklin, Tennessee. He is the patron of the Riverview Polo Team. He has won the USPA Bronze Trophy, the Eastern Challenge, the International Cup and the Continental Cup.

Ingram is a "waterfowler, turkey, and big game hunter." He also practices fox hunting. He is the Masters of the Hillsboro Hounds. In 2010, he went fox-hunting with Olympic show-jumper Markus Fuchs.

== Philanthropy ==
Ingram serves on the Board of Directors of Boys & Girls Clubs of America for Middle Tennessee, Nashville Public Education Foundation, the executive committee of the United Way for Metropolitan Nashville, the Wetlands America Trust Board for Ducks Unlimited. He is the 2005 recipient of the Dr. Thomas F. Frist, Jr. Excellence in Volunteer Leadership Award of the United Way. He is a member of the Vanderbilt Board of Trust, and the U.S. Sportsmen's Alliance.

== Political activity ==
A Republican, Ingram supported George W. Bush in 2000 and 2004, John McCain in 2000 and 2008. He has also supported Fred Thompson, Lindsey Graham, Tom DeLay, Rick Santorum, Mitt Romney, and the National Republican Senatorial Committee.

In 2015, Ingram donated $1,500 to David Fox's failed campaign to become the new Mayor of Nashville.

== Personal life ==
Ingram is divorced, and has two sons, Orrin H. "Hank" Ingram III and Aaron Forest Barrett, and one daughter, Virginia Ingram. Son Orrin was born to his first wife, Terri Drummond Lyon.
