= David Bronson Ingram =

American businessman (born 1962/3)

David B. Ingram
- Born: David Bronson Ingram; 1962 or 1963 (age 62–63)
- Education: Duke University; Owen Graduate School of Management at Vanderbilt University
- Occupation: Businessman
- Spouse: Sarah LeBrun Ingram
- Parent(s): E. Bronson Ingram II; Martha Rivers Ingram
- Relatives: Orrin Henry Ingram (great-great-grandfather); Julius Ingram (great-great-great uncle); Erskine B. Ingram (great-grandfather); Frederic B. Ingram (uncle); Ingrid Goude (aunt by marriage); Orrin H. Ingram II (brother); John R. Ingram (brother)

David Bronson Ingram is an American businessman. He was the chairman and president of Ingram Entertainment, a distributor of DVDs and video games. He is the founder and chairman of DBI Beverage, a distributor of California beers and non-alcoholic drinks.

== Early life ==
Ingram's late father was E. Bronson Ingram II, founder of Ingram Industries. His mother is Martha Rivers Ingram and his brothers are Orrin H. Ingram II and John R. Ingram.

Ingram received a bachelor's degree in history from Duke University in 1985 and an MBA from the Owen Graduate School of Management at Vanderbilt University in May 1989.

== Business career ==
He was development officer of Duke University from 1985 to 1987. He was CEO of Ingram Entertainment until 2012.

He is the chairman of Ingram Entertainment, and the founder and chairman of DBI Beverage.

As of September 2019, Ingram and his wife Sarah LeBrun Ingram had donated a combined $5,600 to U.S. President Donald Trump's 2020 reelection campaign.

== Personal life ==
In 1989, he married Sarah LeBrun, a member of the Duke University women's golf team whom he met when they were students. She won the U.S. Women's Mid-Amateur three times and was elected to the Tennessee Golf Hall of Fame. She elected not to turn pro in order remain in Nashville to raise their two sons.
