= Robert F. McPartlin =

American politician (1926–1987)

- Born: November 2, 1926; Austin, Chicago, Illinois, U.S.
- Died: April 15, 1987 (aged 60)
- Resting place: Queen of Heaven Cemetery, Hillside, Illinois, U.S.
- Education: Campion High School
- Occupation: Politician
- Spouse: Geraldine
- Children: 9

Robert F. McPartlin (November 2, 1926 – April 15, 1987) was an American Democratic politician. He was a member the Illinois House of Representatives for the 16th district from 1960 to 1976, when he was indicted for taking part in a $1.3 million bribery scheme over a "$48 million Chicago sewage contract" alongside billionaire heirs E. Bronson Ingram II and Frederic B. Ingram. McPartlin was sentenced to eight years in prison in 1979, and he died at the end of his sentence.

== Early life ==
Robert F. McPartlin was born on November 2, 1926, in Austin, Chicago. His father, Frank L. McPartlin, was the Democratic committeeman of the 30th ward on the Chicago City Council.

McPartlin was educated at Campion High School. He served in the United States Marine Corps in the Pacific during World War II.

== Career ==
McPartlin was an electrical engineer for the city of Chicago.

McPartlin served as a Democratic member of the Illinois House of Representatives for the 16th district from 1960 to 1976, when he was indicted for taking part in a $1.3 million bribery scheme over a "$48 million Chicago sewage contract" alongside billionaire heirs E. Bronson Ingram II and Frederic B. Ingram. He was convicted of bribery in 1977 alongside Frederic, while Bronson was acquitted. McPartlin was given an eight-year prison sentence in 1979.

== Personal life ==
McPartlin had a wife, Geraldine, and nine children. He was a member of the Knights of Columbus.

He died in April 1987. He was buried in the Queen of Heaven Cemetery in Hillside, Illinois.

== See also ==
- Corruption in the United States
