= CourseSmart =

American education materials company

- Type: Private
- Industry: Education; Software; Publishing
- Founded: 2007
- Founder: Macmillan; Cengage Learning; John Wiley & Sons; McGraw-Hill Education; Pearson
- Defunct: 2016
- Fate: Acquired by Ingram Content Group and integrated into VitalSource eTechnologies
- Successor: VitalSource
- Headquarters: San Mateo, California
- Products: E-textbooks; Digital course materials; Distribution software; eReader software
- Parent: Ingram Content Group
- Website: www.vitalsource.com

CourseSmart, a privately held company headquartered in San Mateo, California, founded in 2007, was a provider of eTextbooks and digital course materials. It was acquired by Ingram Content Group subsidiary VitalSource Technologies in early 2014, and was integrated into the parent company under the VitalSource name and platform by 2016.

== Company history ==
=== Launch and growth ===
CourseSmart was founded in 2007 by the higher education publishers Macmillan, Cengage Learning, John Wiley & Sons, McGraw-Hill Education, and Pearson.

CourseSmart offered access to e-textbooks via web browser from its foundation in 2007. The company allowed readers to rent e-books, rather than buying physical textbooks at an increased cost. Readers had access to both downloadable and online versions of texts. In August 2009 CourseSmart launched an iPhone app, followed by an iPad app in August 2010, and an Android app in April 2011. By September 2011, its eTextbooks catalogue had more than 20,000 digital titles, and purchased books could be printed at no extra charge.

By 2014, the company had partnered with around 50 publishers and provided an estimated 90% of the e-textbooks used in higher education. Despite being one of the two largest ebook providers at the time, CourseSmart had remained fairly small at the time of its acquisition by VitalSource Technologies.

=== Acquisition by VitalSource Bookshelf ===
CourseSmart was acquired by Ingram Content Group subsidiary VitalSource Technologies Inc. in early 2014. Prior to full integration, VitalSource eTextbooks could not be read on the CourseSmart eTextbook platform and vice versa, and both platforms operated separately with no crossover. Full integration under the VitalSource platform was completed by 2016.
