= John R. Ingram (businessman) =

American businessman

- Born: John Rivers Ingram; 1961 or 1962 (age 64)
- Education: Princeton University (BA); Vanderbilt University (MBA)
- Occupation: Businessman
- Spouse: Stephanie Currey Ingram
- Children: 4
- Parent(s): E. Bronson Ingram II; Martha Rivers Ingram
- Relatives: Orrin Henry Ingram (great-great-grandfather); Julius Ingram (great-great-great uncle); Erskine B. Ingram (great-grandfather); Frederic B. Ingram (uncle); Ingrid Goude (aunt by marriage); Orrin H. Ingram II (brother); David Bronson Ingram (brother); Brownlee O. Currey, Jr. (father-in-law)

John Rivers Ingram (born 1961/1962) is an American heir, businessman and philanthropist. He is the chairman of the Ingram Content Group, Lightning Source and Ingram Industries. He is the owner of Nashville SC.

== Early life ==
John Ingram's father is E. Bronson Ingram II, the billionaire founder of Ingram Industries. His mother is Martha Rivers Ingram and his brothers are Orrin H. Ingram II and David Bronson Ingram.

His paternal, fifth-generation grandfather, David Ingram, was an immigrant from Leeds, England. His paternal great-great-grandfather, Orrin Henry Ingram, was a lumber baron in Eau Claire, Wisconsin, and an early investor in Friedrich Weyerhäuser's timber interests, later known as the Weyerhaeuser corporation.

Ingram received a bachelor's degree in English from Princeton University in 1984, and an MBA from the Owen Graduate School of Management at Vanderbilt University in 1986.

== Career ==
=== Ingram Industries ===
Ingram joined the family business, Ingram Industries, in 1986. He worked for Ingram Micro, in Santa Ana, California, then in Belgium, during the 1990s. He was vice-chairman of Ingram Industries, from 1999 to 2008, is now chairman. He also is CEO and chairman of the Ingram Content Group. He has been a member of the board of directors of Ingram Micro since 1996, and sits on the advisory board of FCA Venture Partners.

=== Nashville SC ===
In August 2017, Ingram became "the lead investor in the effort to bring a Major League Soccer team to Nashville, later known as the Nashville SC, alongside fellow billionaires Mark Wilf, Zygi Wilf and Leonard Wilf. To avoid a "conflict of interest," Ingram decided not to participate in negotiations on behalf of Vanderbilt University, where he is a trustee (as does Mark Wilf), about a new stadium potentially built by the university; the university decided to opt out of the plan in September.

In November 2017, Nashville Mayor Megan Barry suggested giving away "10 acres of city-owned fairgrounds land for a mix-use development next to the stadium" to the developers, including Ingram. Some councilmembers objected to the plan, but Ingram called it "an essential part of our proposal in the private/public partnership."

As of December 2017, Ingram is expected to offset the construction costs of the $275 million Nashville Fairgrounds Stadium. In particular, he is expected to pay "$25 million up front and $9 million a year over 30 years to help retire Metro's annual $13 million debt for the $225 bond issuance."

== Political activity and civic engagements ==
Ingram contributed US$1,500 to Republican David Fox's unsuccessful mayoral campaign in 2015.

Ingram sits on the boards of trustees of the National Book Foundation and the National Center for Learning Disabilities, Vanderbilt University, the Montgomery Bell Academy, Western Governors University (WGU) Tennessee, and the Harpeth Hall School in Nashville. He is a member of the Charles Davis Foundation and the Princeton Varsity Club Advisory Committee. The John R. Ingram '83 Endowed Fund for Athletics in the Department of Athletics at Princeton is named for him.

== Personal life ==
Ingram is married to Stephanie Currey, the daughter of Brownlee O. Currey, Jr. They have four children. They reside in Belle Meade, Tennessee.
