= Orrin Henry Ingram =

American lumber baron

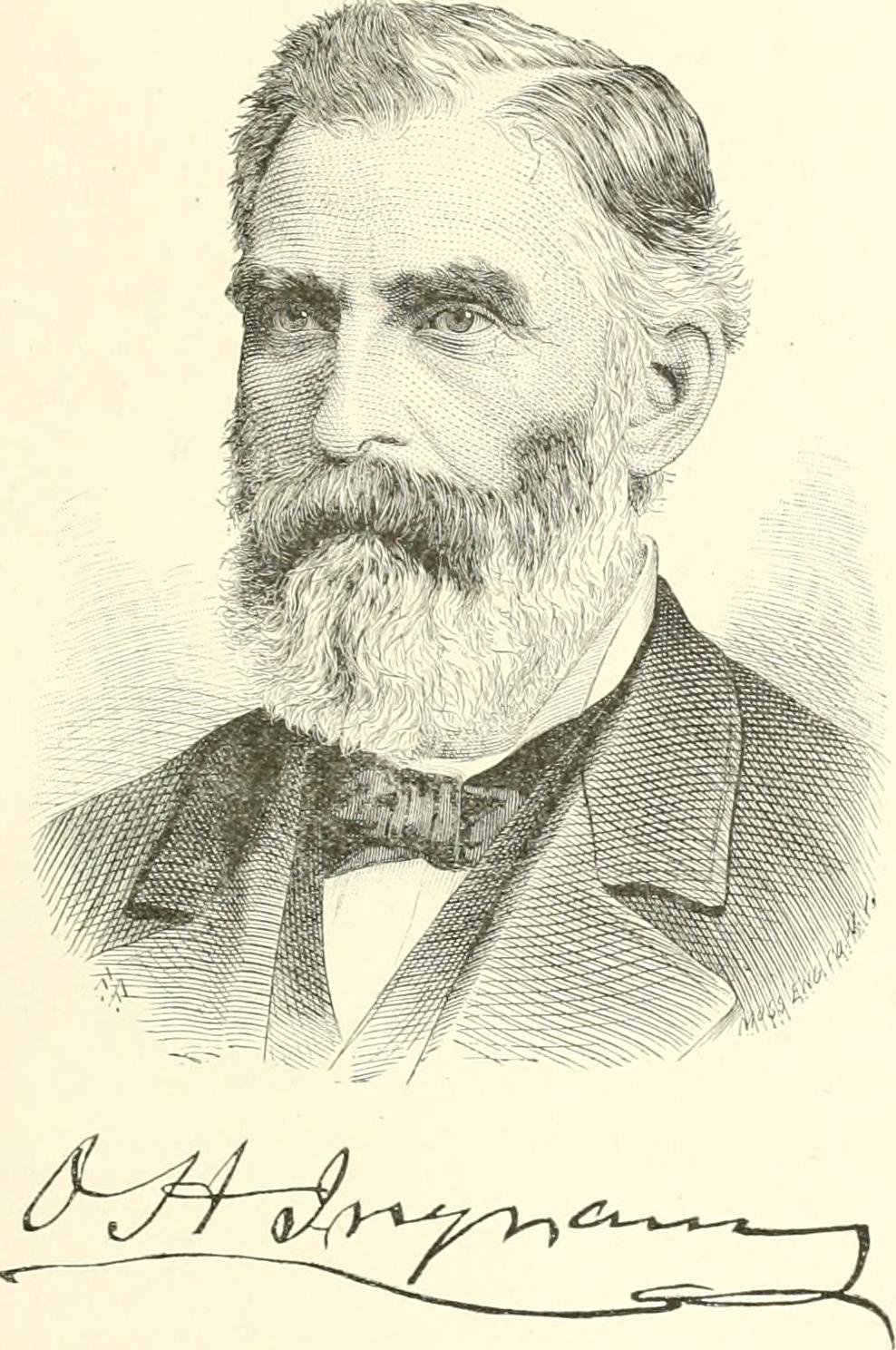
- Born: May 13, 1830; Westfield, Massachusetts
- Died: October 16, 1918 (aged 88); Eau Claire, Wisconsin
- Resting place: Lake View Cemetery
- Occupations: Businessman, philanthropist
- Spouse: Cornelia Pierce Ingram
- Children: Charles Ingram; Erskine B. Ingram; Fanny Ingram; Miriam Hayes
- Parent(s): David A. Ingram; Fanny Granger
- Relatives: Julius Ingram (brother); Edward S. Hayes (son-in-law); Orrin Henry Ingram, Sr. (grandson); E. Bronson Ingram II (great-grandson); Frederic B. Ingram (great-grandson); Martha R. Ingram (great-granddaughter-in-law); Ingrid Goude (great-granddaughter-in-law); David Bronson Ingram (great-great-grandson); Orrin H. Ingram II (great-great-grandson); John R. Ingram (great-great-grandson)

Orrin Henry Ingram (May 13, 1830 – October 16, 1918) was an American lumber baron and philanthropist from Eau Claire, Wisconsin. Orphaned at age 11, he established sawmills in Ontario, Canada, and the Chippewa Valley of Wisconsin. He was a banker and philanthropist in Eau Claire.

== Early life ==
Ingram was born on May 13, 1830, in Westfield, Massachusetts. His paternal grandfather, David Ingram, had immigrated from Leeds, England, in 1780. He grew up in Saratoga, New York, and he was orphaned at eleven, as his father died in 1841. He worked on a farm from the age of eleven to seventeen. After his mother remarried, they lived on Lake George. Orrin's brother, Julius Ingram, would become a member of the Wisconsin State Assembly.

== Career ==
Ingram started his career at Harris & Bronson Lumber Company in New York City in 1847. The company was active at Pharaoh Lake and after working there for two years, Ingram took over managing the mill.

Later, he worked for Fox & Englin, building a sawmill on the Rideau Canal and several sawmills on the Moira River, both of which are in Canada. Shortly after, he built another sawmill in Ottawa, Canada, for Harris & Bronson. He was then hired by Gilmour & Company, another Canadian lumber company. He invented the gang edger, but failed to patent it, leaving that opportunity to someone else.

In 1857, Ingram established a sawmill in the Chippewa Valley of Wisconsin with Donald Kennedy and Alexander M. Dole. Their systematic deforestation led to the establishment of new towns across the valley. They established lumber yards in Wabasha, Minnesota, and Dubuque, Iowa. By 1881, the concern became known as the Empire Lumber Company. It was headquartered in Eau Claire, Wisconsin. Meanwhile, the lumber yard in Wabasha became the Wabasha Lumber Company and the one in Dubuque became known as the Standard Lumber Company. Ingram served as the president of both companies. He was also the founder and president of the Rice Lake Lumber Company in Rice Lake, Wisconsin. Additionally, he was an early investor in Friedrich Weyerhäuser's timber investments, later known as the Weyerhaeuser corporation.

Ingram played an active role in the development of Eau Claire. He served as the President of the Eau Claire Water Works Company. He also served as the President of the Eau Claire National Bank and the Union National Bank.

In Canada, Ingram served as the Treasurer of the Anthracite Coal Company, which operated in Anthracite, Alberta.

Ingram published his autobiography.

== Philanthropy ==
Ingram was an active philanthropist in Eau Claire, where he was a member of YMCA locally and paid for the construction of its headquarters. He donated the statue of Adin Randall which stands in Randall Park, a public park in Eau Claire. He served on the board of trustees of the Wisconsin Congregational Church and Ripon College, as well as on the Wisconsin State Capitol commission. He made financial contributions to the American Red Cross.

Upon losing his son Charles, he built the Charles H. Ingram Memorial Congregational Church in Washington, D.C. Its foundation stone was laid by President William Howard Taft, when he was joined by Senator Robert M. La Follette and Congressman John J. Esch. The church included a school and a swimming pool. Ingram rationalized the presence of a swimming pool by stressing, "Cleanliness Is Next to Godliness." The church still stands today on the corner of Massachusetts Avenue and 10th Street, across from Lincoln Park The building was purchased in March 1986 by the Capitol Hill Seventh-day Adventist Church congregation.

After he was widowed, Ingram established the Cornelia Pierce Ingram Memorial Community House in honor of his wife.

== Personal life ==
He married Cornelia Pierce Ingram on December 11, 1851. They had two sons, Charles H. Ingram, who predeceased him, and Erskine B. Ingram, as well as two daughters, Fanny, who predeceased him, and Miriam, who married Edward S. Hayes. They resided on Third Avenue and Hudson Street in Eau Claire, Wisconsin. His wife predeceased him, dying in 1911.

== Death ==
He died on October 16, 1918, at the age of 88, leaving an estate estimated to be worth over one million dollars. He was buried at the Lake View Cemetery in Eau Claire.

== Secondary source ==
- Charles Twining. Downriver: Orrin H. Ingram and the Empire Lumber Company. Madison, Wisconsin: Wisconsin Historical Society. 1975.
