= Toby S. Wilt =

American businessman and golfer

- Born: c. 1945
- Education: Vanderbilt University
- Occupations: Businessman, golfer, philanthropist

Toby Wilt (born c. 1945) is an American businessman and golfer. He is a member of the Tennessee Golf Hall of Fame and the Vanderbilt Athletics Hall of Fame. He was one of the founders of the Golf Club of Tennessee and was director the Tennessee Golf Foundation (TGF) for its first 19 years. In 2013, he was paired with Brandt Snedeker and the duo won the 2013 Pebble Beach National Pro-Am Golf Tournament. Beginning in 2008, Wilt began an annual role as the "starter" on the first tee for Masters Tournament at Augusta National Golf Club before an international television audience. Wilt says, "Fore please, (player's name) now driving".

== Early life ==
Wilt was born circa 1945 in Evanston, Illinois, and played wingback on Evanston Township High School's Wildkits in 1960. He attended Vanderbilt University on a football scholarship, and he also played on the golf team there in the 1960s. He has a degree in civil engineering and he is also a certified public accountant (non-practicing).

== Career ==
He serves as the president of the TSW Investment Company. He is the chairman of the Christie Cookie Company and a director of the CapStar Bank. Wilt has served on numerous corporate boards across six different industries. He has two sons and a daughter. One son, T.J. Wilt, as of 2013, was a majority owner of "Cumberland Transit", a bicycle and outdoor-goods business in Nashville. Fleming Wilt is the president of Christie Cookies, founded in 1983 as a single store in Nashville. In 2019, the company was acquired by Rich Products, a New York-based company. His daughter, Jodi Wilt Banks, is a homemaker in Nashville. His grandson, Toby Wilt, won the 116th Texas Amateur in 2025.

== Golf ==
At Vanderbilt University, he created the Toby S. Wilt athletic scholarship, originally for football, but later expanded to include golf. Former recipients include PGA Tour players Luke List and Brandt Snedeker. In 2013, Wilt teamed with Snedeker and won the Pebble Beach National Pro-Am Golf Tournament. Wilt was inducted into the Tennessee Golf Hall of Fame and the Vanderbilt Athletics Hall of Fame in 2017.

With billionaire businessman Bronson Ingram and George N. Gillett, Jr., Wilt co-founded the Golf Club of Tennessee in Kingston Springs in 1991. This is an 18-hole Tom Fazio course on 317–acres (218 hectares) near Nashville. It contains a 31,000 sq ft clubhouse and the Ingram Cabin and can accommodate 16 overnight guests. Wilt was director the Tennessee Golf Foundation for its first 19 years The Tennessee Golf Foundation's primary fundraiser is musician Vince Gill's Annual Golf tournament, "the Vinny", held at the Golf Club of Tennessee.

Each spring, Wilt serves as the starter on the first tee at the Masters Tournament at Augusta National Golf Club, of which he is a member.
