= VitalSource =

American education technology and content company

- VitalSource Technologies, Inc.
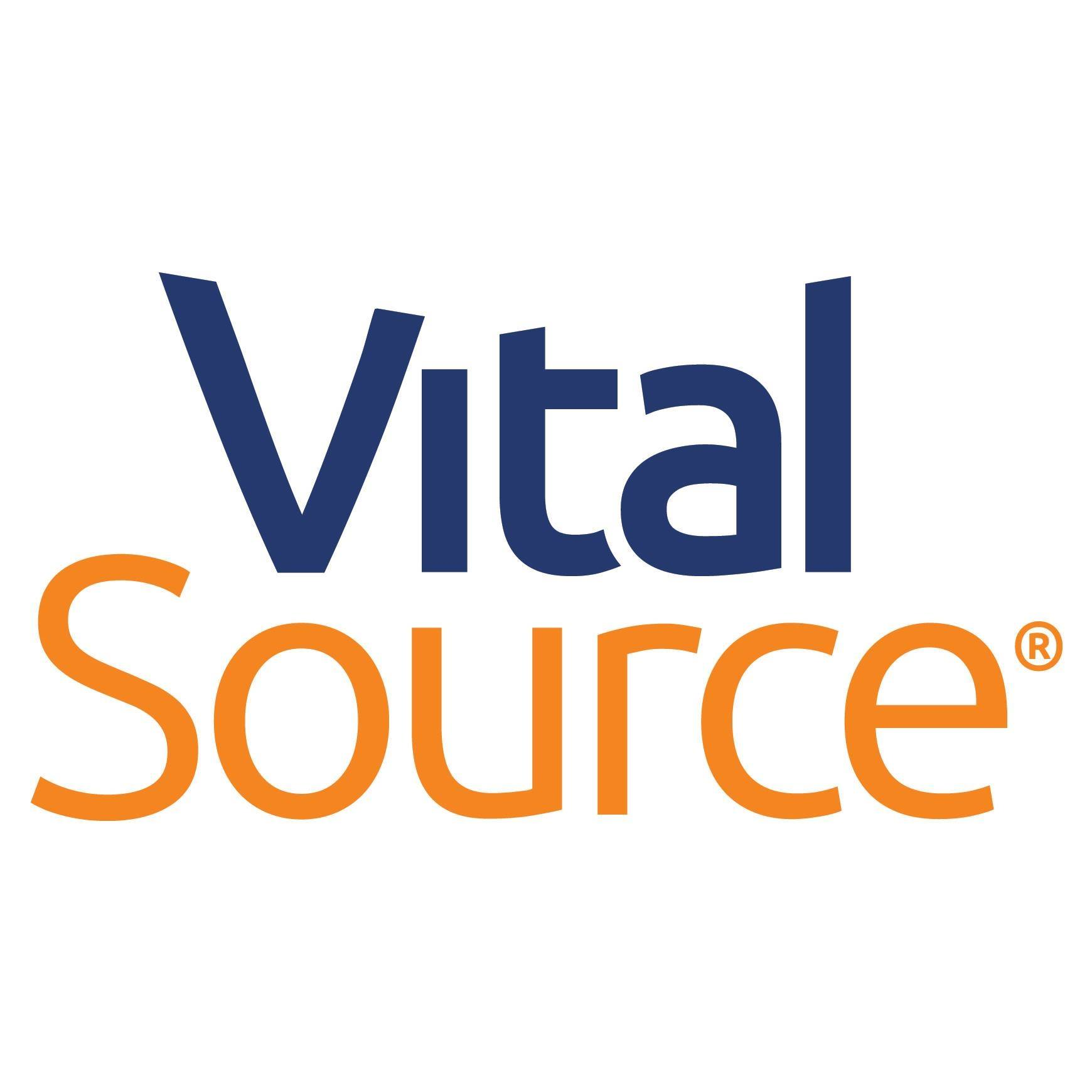
- Formation: 1994
- Headquarters: Raleigh, North Carolina, United States
- Products: Acrobatiq, SmartStart, Bookshelf, Intrepid, and Verba
- Services: Education Technology Solutions
- Parent organization: Francisco Partners
- Subsidiaries: Verba, Acrobatiq, Intrepid, Akademos
- Website: get.vitalsource.com

VitalSource Technologies is an education technology and digital content company founded in 1994. The company works with companies, universities, and publishers and resellers, providing digital course materials to users. VitalSource has offices in Raleigh, North Carolina; Boston, Massachusetts and Chicago, Illinois, as well as basing their international operations out of Milton Keynes in the UK.

== History ==
=== Launch and growth ===
VitalSource was founded in 1994 in San Antonio, Texas, by Dr. Robert Todd Watkins, Jr. The original team that came together to help Watkins launch the company included Rick Johnson, who had spent the previous twelve years at Apple; William Chesser, who joined from a position in the School of Education at the University of North Carolina at Chapel Hill; and Willie Abrams, who came over from the University of Oklahoma's Center for Telemedicine. The company was formed to look for ways technology could improve learning.

As a faculty member at the University of Texas Health Science Center at San Antonio in the early 1990s, Watkins' research projects focused on the impact of technology on teaching and learning. He was interested in how technology might infuse "new life" into what he saw as unconnected and non-interactive course materials that were being used for problem-based learning (PBL). With support from then-dean Dr. Ken Kalkwarf, Watkins began testing his ideas with both students and faculty in 1991. Apple Computer provided equipment grants to grow the original prototype into an integrated e-textbook platform called "Macinstein". Several medical publishers, including Williams & Wilkins and Little, Brown, provided content licenses and financial grants for digital inclusion of their books in the system. Drs. John Littlefield, Janise Richards, and Spencer Redding provided early educational, technological, and academic guidance for the fledgeling project. The University of Texas System facilitated a technology transfer of the intellectual property into Vital Source Technologies, Inc. in June 1994.

In January 1997, the company set up offices at 10010 San Pedro Blvd in San Antonio. During this early period, business was supported by a small group of angel investors and by SATEX Investment Partners, run by Danny Mills. In 1999, the team relocated to Raleigh, North Carolina, where the company added backing from a group of investors led by Frank Daniels III. The company remains headquartered in Raleigh. Kalkwarf coordinated a consortium of dental schools who were interested in implementing their books using the VitalBook format. These schools included University of Texas Health Science Center at San Antonio, University of Buffalo, New York University, University of Medicine and Dentistry of New Jersey (now Rutgers), and Boston University. Working collectively, these dental schools and Vital Source worked to develop the first commercial content licenses for implementation. It was the first digital book license that allowed for the mixing of content from multiple competing publishers in one curricular product.

The company's first commercial implementations kicked off in 2000 when the small group of dental schools piloted the use of an early course materials solution—DVDs that held full digital versions of each student's entire four years of textbooks, workbooks, lecture slides, manuals, and handbooks. The digital curriculum was updated each semester and stayed with students after graduation as a professional resource.

VitalSource's initial business was in dental education. However, in the early 2000s, as interest grew in its dental school offerings, the company added business by white-labelling versions of its software for publishers—initially for Elsevier Health in the nursing market with a product called Evolve Select. During the same early period, VitalSource launched a partnership with the PC division of IBM (later carried over to Lenovo) pre-loading large sets of organized, searchable, royalty-free content on laptops destined for education markets worldwide. The program was rolled out at select schools alongside IBM's "ThinkPad University" program.

By 2005, one in three dental students in America was receiving all their curriculum support materials digitally from VitalSource.

In its first decade in the market, VitalSource launched multiple innovations. These included the first digital full-curriculum product, the first multi-publisher digital-course-materials solution in higher education, the first synchronized online/offline digital reading platform, and the first LMS-integrated e-textbook delivery.

In July 2006, VitalSource was acquired by Ingram Content Group, a service provider to the publishing industry and a subsidiary of Ingram Industries.

Before the end of the decade, VitalSource had moved beyond health sciences and was powering the world's first fully integrated, campus-wide e-textbook programs for EDMC and DeVry University. By 2011, VitalSource began to extend the impact of its solutions outside the U.S., with department-wide (and later campus-wide) implementations at Plymouth University in the U.K., Swinburne Online University in Australia, and the Higher Colleges of Technology in the U.A.E, as well as in Brazil and South Africa through partnerships with Minha Biblioteça and Van Schaiks Booksellers.

Also at this time, VitalSource extended its support for adult learners in the corporate training space through a partnership with Gilmore Global.

Over the last decade, VitalSource has broadened its suite of services to better address issues of access and affordability in higher education. In 2011, they expanded their design and development capabilities by acquiring VPG Integrated Media, a Boston-based digital publisher-services provider. VPG founders Doug Latham and Chip Price joined VitalSource at that time. Then in March 2014, VitalSource announced the acquisition of CourseSmart, an academic e-publishing consortium that at the time made available an extensive inventory of e-textbooks that covered a large swath of the higher education market—including up to an estimated 90 percent of e-textbooks in use at that time in higher education. Today, VitalSource's digital distribution and access technologies are used at more than 80 percent of higher education institutions in the United States.

In April 2017, as the market for access to digital resources continued to accelerate both in the U.S. and around the world, VitalSource announced the acquisition of Verba Software, Inc. Founded in 2008 by Ryan Peterson and Jared Pearlman to help college students save money on textbooks, Verba grew to provide several web-based services enabling campus retailers to promote affordable course materials. These efforts culminated in the Verba Connect product, which facilitates the management of Inclusive Access and Equitable Access course-material delivery models. Later that same year, VitalSource announced the acquisition of Intrepid Learning, a collaborative learning-platform business serving the corporate training market. The Intrepid acquisition expanded VitalSource footprint into the corporate markets. Post-acquisition, the business operates as Intrepid by VitalSource, and Sam Herring, formerly CEO of Intrepid Learning, serves as Vice President and General Manager of the business.

In 2018, in a move to expand its learning platform options for learners, VitalSource acquired Acrobatiq, a learning and data analytics platform. Built on research from Carnegie-Mellon University, the Acrobatiq platform is an adaptive learning courseware platform designed to increase student engagement and allow for more personalization in the learning process.

In 2019, the company partnered with Barnes & Noble Education (BNED) to expand access to and implementation of BNED's "FirstDay" Inclusive Access program, which gives students access to course materials by or before the first day of class each term.

In June 2021, Ingram Content Group completed the sale of VitalSource to Francisco Partners.

In 2023, in a move to accelerate and enhance its equitable access programs, VitalSource acquired Akademos. In addition to their supply chain expertise and EA innovations, their work in analytics and syllabus management capabilities will enable VitalSource to provide a more complete set of capabilities to campus stores and institutions.

== Services ==
VitalSource offers four learning platforms: Acrobatiq by VitalSource (courseware), Bookshelf (digital content), Intrepid (corporate learning), and SmartStart (course creation), and a variety of digital content management tools spanning analytics, sampling, and campus store management.

Its partners include publishers, academic institutions, campus retailers, and training and certification associations.

== See also ==
- Academic publishing
- Educational technology
- Educational software
- Digital textbook
- E-book
- Digital rights management
