= Sarah LeBrun Ingram =

American amateur gofer

- Born: Sarah LeBrun; 1965 or 1966 (age 59–60)
- Education: Garrison Forest School; Duke University
- Occupation: Amateur golfer
- Spouse: David Bronson Ingram
- Relatives: E. Bronson Ingram II (father-in-law); Martha Rivers Ingram (mother-in-law); Orrin H. Ingram II (brother-in-law)

Sarah LeBrun Ingram (née LeBrun, born 1965/1966) is an American amateur golfer, a member of the Tennessee Golf Hall of Fame and the Tennessee Sports Hall of Fame. She is a former All-American golfer at Duke University who became a three-time winner of the U.S. Women's Mid-Amateur. (Note: A "mid-amateur" is defined by the USGA as an amateur golfer 25 years of age or older.) Ingram represented the U.S. on the Curtis Cup team in 1992, 1994 and 1996. She is a member of the Duke Athletics Hall of Fame. In 1993, Golf Digest, Golfweek and Golf World named her either number one amateur or Amateur Player of the Year. At age 30, despite winning many titles, she made the decision not to turn pro. She gave up her golf career because she wanted to raise a family and also because of a diagnosis of rheumatoid arthritis.

== Early life ==
Ingram grew up in Owings Mills, Maryland, a suburb of Baltimore. Her father, Henry Frances LeBrun, owned a real estate and insurance business. Her mother was Gillian D. LeBrun. Sarah has three sisters and attended Garrison Forest School. At Duke University, where she played golf, she met David Ingram who was on the men's golf team. They were married in 1989, one year after her graduation. The couple settled and remained in Nashville.

In the late 1980s and early 1990s Ingram became prominent in the world of women's golf. After winning many junior and collegiate titles, she won the 1990 Canadian Women's Amateur by nine strokes. Winning national titles catapulted Ingram into international competition – appearances on three U.S. Curtis Cup teams (1992, 1994, 1996) and the U.S. Women's World Amateur teams (1992, 1994).

== Career decision ==
At age 30, she began having pain in her joints and within a few months became unable to bend two fingers on each hand and couldn't grip a golf club; the diagnosis of rheumatoid arthritis was made in October 1996. She had a strong desire to raise a family to begin with, and to stay clear of the pro golf lifestyle. That desire plus the diagnosis convinced her not to turn pro. This was her last year of national competition. She has two sons.

She played very little golf in the next 20 years. In the golf hiatus Ingram became active in equestrian sports as a competitive hunter/jumper and was involved in an equestrian program for children with disabilities. She became immersed in charitable activities. Around 2016 she agreed to co-chair the 118th U.S. Women's Amateur held in Kingston Springs, Tennessee, at the Golf Club of Tennessee.

== Golf resurgence ==
After a 20 year hiatus from golf, a door opened to reintroduce her to the sport. The Golf Club of Tennessee, where her husband was president, was selected to host the 2018 U.S. Women's Amateur and she agreed to co-chair the event. She was then asked by USGA president Mark Newell to serve as captain of the 2020 U.S. Curtis Cup. The eight-player women's team was to compete against Great Britain in June, 2020, but was postponed due to the COVID-19 pandemic. The match was eventually held at Conwy Golf Club on the northern coast of Wales in August, 2021. After getting back to playing golf again, she won the 2020 Tennessee Women's Senior Amateur at Nashville's Richland Country club. Ingram said, "I've been back to golf over the last two years and been working on my game". "It's been really fun playing competitively again and this is my first win." The following year, Ingram won the 2021 inaugural Ladies National Golf Association Senior Championship, playing 54 holes at Anthem (Arizona) Golf Club in 10 over to finish six shots ahead of the runner-up.

== Amateur wins ==
- 1986 Maryland State Women's Amateur
- 1987 Maryland State Women's Amateur
- 1989 Mid-Atlantic Amateur
- 1990 Canadian Women's Amateur, Mid-Atlantic Amateur, Nashville Women's City Amateur
- 1991 U.S. Women's Mid-Amateur, Women's Western Amateur, Tennessee Women's State Amateur
- 1992 Broadmoor Women's Invitational
- 1993 U.S. Women's Mid-Amateur, Women's Southern Amateur
- 1994 U.S. Women's Mid-Amateur, Women's Southern Amateur
- 2020 Tennessee Women's Senior Amateur
- 2021 Ladies National Golf Association Senior Championship
- Captain of the USA 2021 Curtis Cup team

== U.S. national team appearances ==
Amateur

- Curtis Cup: 1992, 1994, 1996, 2021 (non-playing captain, winners), 2022 (non-playing captain, winners)
- Espirito Santo Trophy: 1992, 1994
