= Erskine B. Ingram =

American businessman (1866–1954)

- Born: September 29, 1866; Eau Claire, Wisconsin
- Died: January 18, 1954 (aged 87); Eau Claire, Wisconsin
- Occupation: Businessman
- Spouse: Harriet Louise Coggshall Ingram
- Children: Orrin Henry Ingram Sr.
- Parent(s): Orrin Henry Ingram; Cornelia Pierce Ingram
- Relatives: Julius Ingram (uncle); E. Bronson Ingram II (grandson); Frederic B. Ingram (grandson); Martha R. Ingram (granddaughter-in-law); Ingrid Goude (granddaughter-in-law); David Bronson Ingram (great-grandson); Orrin H. Ingram II (great-grandson); John R. Ingram (great-grandson)

Erskine B. Ingram (September 29, 1866 – January 18, 1954) was an American heir, lumber baron, and philanthropist.

== Early life ==
Erskine B. Ingram was born on September 29, 1866, in Eau Claire, Wisconsin. His father, Orrin Henry Ingram, was a lumber baron. His mother was Cornelia Pierce Ingram. His uncle, Julius Ingram, was a member of the Wisconsin State Assembly. His paternal great-grandfather, David Ingram, immigrated from Leeds, England.

== Career ==
Ingram inherited his father's concerns in the lumber industry. He served as the chairman of Investment Securities and Ingram Products Company. He served on the board of directors of the Union National Bank of Eau Claire, of which his father had served as president.

Additionally, he was a co-founder of the New Dells Lumber Company with Pearl Chambers, J. E. Hosford, and Judge James Wickham, and served as its president.

== Philanthropy ==
Ingram served on the board of advisors of the Salvation Army and on the board of directors of YMCA. He was a member of the Kiwanis.

== Personal life ==
Ingram married Harriet Louise Coggshall Ingram. They attended the First Congregational Church of Eau Claire. Their estate in Eau Claire was heavily burned by a rubbish fire at a local city dump in 1953. They had a son, Orrin Henry Ingram Sr., named after Erskine's father.

== Death ==
He died on January 18, 1954, in Eau Claire. He was eighty-two years old.
