= Petrolsoft =

Petrolsoft Corporation
- Type: Distribution software
- Industry: Petroleum
- Founded: 1989
- Founder: Bill Miller and David Gamboa
- Defunct: 2000
- Fate: Acquired by Aspen Technology
- Headquarters: San Diego, California
- Area served: Worldwide

Petrolsoft Corporation (1989–2000) was a supply chain management software company with a focus on the petroleum industry. Petrolsoft Corporation was founded at Stanford University in 1989 by Bill Miller and David Gamboa as Petrolsoft Software Group. It was later incorporated in 1992. Petrolsoft introduced demand-driven inventory management to the petroleum industry.

== History ==
The initial idea for Petrolsoft's inventory management product came from founder David Gamboa family's cash flow problems at their chain of retail gasoline stations. Mr. Miller's analysis showed that it was being caused by an inventory imbalance of gasoline stocks. When they approached Chevron with their solution, they discovered this was more than just a family problem, rather an industry-wide problem. The software solution to this problem became Petrolsoft's initial product, based on inventory proportionality.

Gordon Hartogensis, a Stanford computer science graduate, joined the company in 1993 as the third partner to lead product development. Petrolsoft's products grew to include sales forecasting, inventory management, demand aggregation, remote inventory and sales reporting, and transportation optimization for the downstream petroleum supply chain and other bulk liquid supply chains.

== Technology ==
Tank trucks in the oil industry are typically divided internally into 3 to 6 compartments of various sizes. Service stations typically sell three or four different grades of motor fuel. Each delivered grade of motor fuel must have a dedicated underground storage tank. For example, a four-compartment truck bringing up to four different products can be filled in 256 (4^{4}) different ways. Petrolsoft's technology would choose the optimal way to restore inventory proportionality to the station based on its forecasts of sales by product grade.

The technology would accurately forecast hourly demand for each grade of motor fuel at each service station, enabling it to determine when the first product would run out, the amounts of other products that would be left at that time, and when the optimal load chosen would fit in the underground storage tanks. The period of time from the forecasted time of fitting in the tanks to the point of product run out was called the “delivery window”. The delivery window represented the delivery flexibility of when the load could arrive at the service station so that it would fit in the tanks, and arrive prior to first product run out.

Based on all of the delivery windows for all of the forecasted deliveries for all of the stations in an oil company's directly supplied service station network, Petrolsoft's technology would optimize the distribution of motor fuel by scheduling fleets of tank trucks to meet the demand across the distribution network. This optimal automation of the replenishment process led to lower average inventories, better utilization of tank truck fleets, lower overall distribution costs, and reduced manpower requirements. This type of time-based demand-balanced replenishment (just-in-time) was extended up the supply chain from the filling stations to the bulk terminals, where the finished product was stored and then to the refinery where the product was made from crude oil feedstocks.

== Influence ==
Initial customers for the product included Sunoco, ARCO, Mobil, Exxon, and Tosco, expanding to many of the major oil companies in the United States, and eventually world-wide at companies such as YPF (Argentina) and Ampol (Australia). Petrolsoft grew quickly, eventually making the Inc. 500 list of America's fastest growing private companies in both 1998 and 1999. By this time, Petrolsoft had about 50 specialized employees working in three global offices: San Diego, London and Singapore and had released multi-lingual versions of their software for use worldwide. In September 2000, following an extended sales effort, on-site pilot program and the acquisition of Petrolsoft by Aspen Technology, Chevron became one of the largest US customers. The Chevron contract was executed on September 30, 2000 and announced on November 16, 2000. In May 2001, Petro-Canada became the largest Canadian customer, utilizing the software to manage the majority of their company-owned sites located in Ontario and Quebec. In 2003, Petro-Canada extended the solution nationwide. Irving Oil became the next largest Canadian customer, also executing a contract in 2001. Savings for these companies as a result of using Petrolsoft's solutions was in the millions of dollars each year.

Prior to the implementation of Petrolsoft's technology, the petroleum industry functioned as a "push" manufacturing system. That is, product was manufactured based on current market prices without regard to actual branded demand. Once Petrolsoft's demand forecasting based inventory management system was implemented, oil companies were able to track and aggregate demand from their end customers on a real time basis. This allowed them to optimize transportation resources such as tank trucks and pipelines, and to inform how much of their daily demand was constant branded demand versus spot price-driven demand. This real-time information flow changed the way the downstream petroleum industry operated and increased profitability across all adopters. Additionally, the technology prevented service stations from running out of gasoline, lowered inventory carrying costs, and lowered the cost per gallon delivered to the customer.

== Acquisition ==
On June 1, 2000, Petrolsoft Corporation was acquired by Aspen Technology, Inc. (AZPN), a public software company focused on the process manufacturing software space in an all-stock transaction valued at approximately $60 million at the time of acquisition. Over a several month period, Petrolsoft's Supply Retail software suite was integrated with Aspen Technology's PIMS crude selection and refinery operations planning and execution software. Petrolsoft's suite of supply chain management tools completed Aspen's fully integrated petroleum offering from the sourcing of crude oil, through the manufacturing process, and down to the end customer putting gasoline into their vehicle.

== See also ==
- Petroleum industry
- Supply chain management
