= Ingram Barge Company =

American barge company

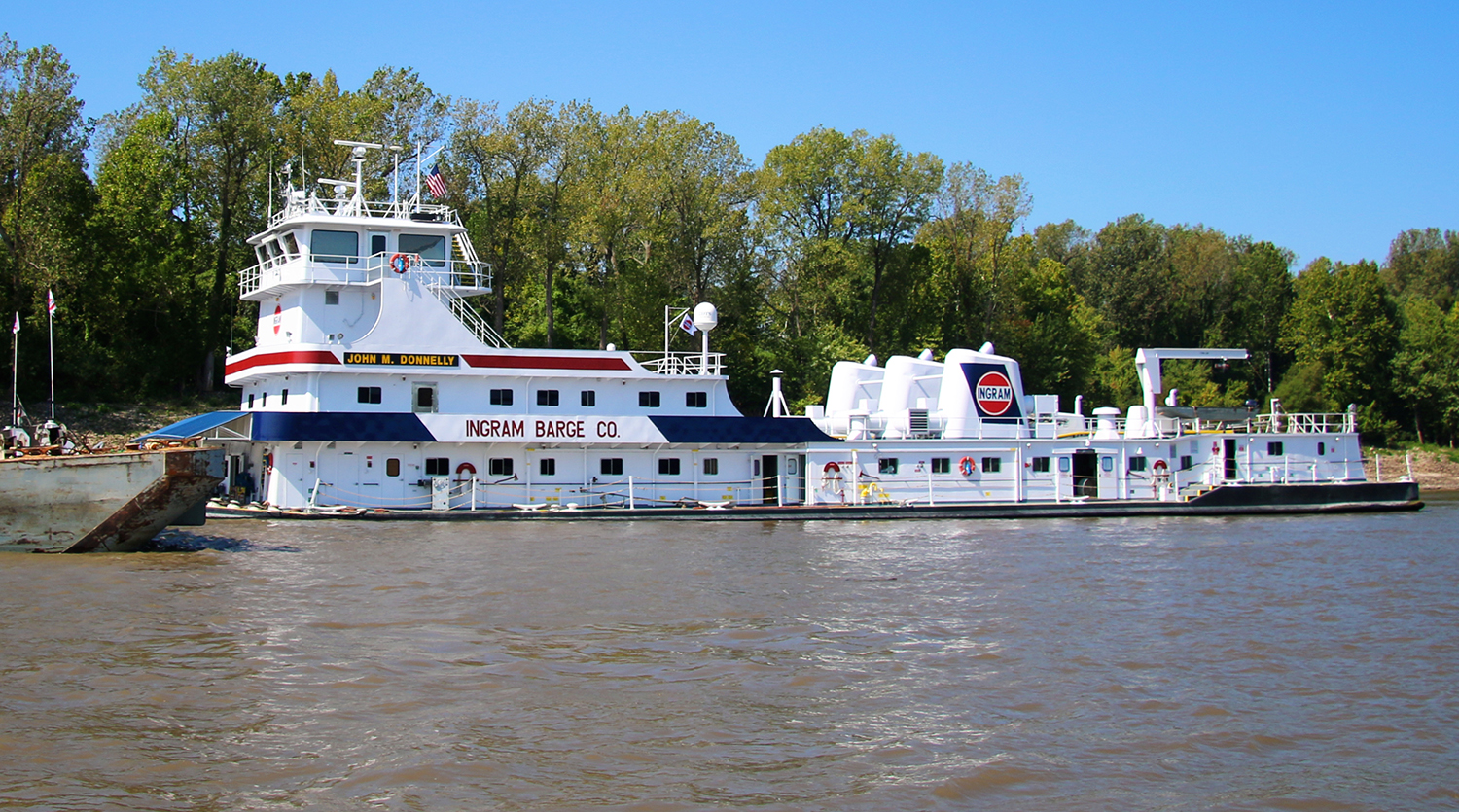
- Type: Private (subsidiary of Ingram Industries
- Industry: Transportation
- Founded: 1946; 80 years ago
- Founder: Orrin Henry Ingram, Sr.
- Headquarters: Nashville, Tennessee, U.S.
- Key people: Orrin Ingram (CEO)
- Services: Barge transport
- Parent: Ingram Industries
- Website: www.ingrambarge.com

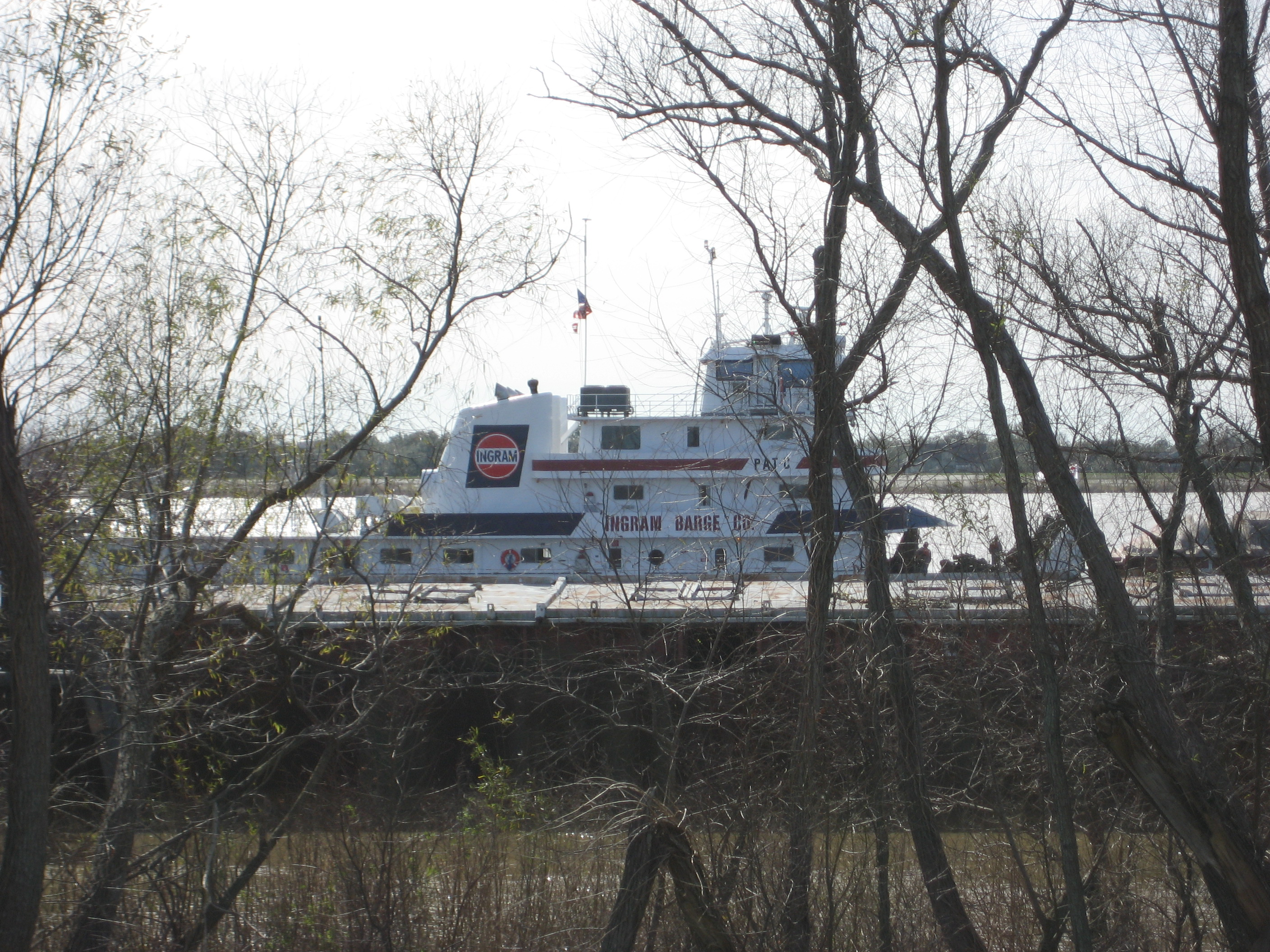
Ingram Barge Company M/V PAT C at Chalmette, Louisiana

The Ingram Barge Company is a barge company based in Nashville, Tennessee, United States.

According to the company website, Ingram operates nearly 4,000 barges with a fleet of over 80 linehaul vessels and over 30 tug boats. The company operates on the Mississippi River, Ohio River, Cumberland River, Tennessee River, Gulf Intracoastal Waterway, Kanawha River, Illinois River, and the Monongahela River. In 1994 Forbes magazine listed Ingram as the 14th largest privately held company in the United States. Ingram Barge is part of the Ingram Marine Group, in turn part of Ingram Industries.

== History ==
Ingram Barge Company (IBCO) was founded in 1946 by Orrin Henry Ingram, Sr., also known as Hank. The company started out as Ingram Products Company, transporting primarily petroleum and running terminals in St. Paul and Louisville. Over time, Hank expanded the barging side of the business and reorganized his fleet under a new subsidiary – Ingram Barge Company. He brought on his sons, Frederic B. Ingram and E. Bronson Ingram II, to be integral members of the company.

In the 1960s, IBCO acquired a sand and gravel yard, which would later become known as Ingram Materials Company, and officially put IBCO into the dry cargo transportation business. During this time of expansion, the family was hit with the unexpected: Hank Ingram died in April 1963.

After Hank’s death, Bronson and Fritz continued their father’s vision of growing their barging business. They expanded into off-shore marine construction and started moving other types of cargo, among them coal and crushed stone. In 1978, the brothers split up Ingram Corporation. Bronson began his leadership of Ingram Industries Inc., which encompassed IBCO.

In 1984, Ingram purchased Ohio Barge Line, formerly owned by U.S. Steel. Neil N. Diehl came on board as Chairman Emeritus of IBCO to oversee the acquisition. During the 1980s, Ingram bought many boats and barges from several different transportation companies, allowing IBCO to become the third largest for-hire river carrier in the U.S.

On June 15, 1995, E. Bronson Ingram died. Ingram Industries was then organized, naming two of Bronson’s sons, Orrin H. Ingram II and John R. Ingram, as Co-Presidents. In 1998, Orrin was appointed Chairman of IBCO and in 1999, became President and CEO of Ingram Industries. John became Vice Chairman of Ingram Industries and Craig E. Philip was named President and CEO of Ingram Barge Co. Following Craig's retirement in 2014, Orrin was named CEO of Ingram Barge Co.

In 2002, IBCO acquired Midland Enterprises LLC, which included The Ohio River Company LLC and Orgulf Transport LLC. In 2005, Ingram acquired Riverway Company. These strategic acquisitions allowed Ingram to become what it is today – the largest carrier on the inland waterway system.

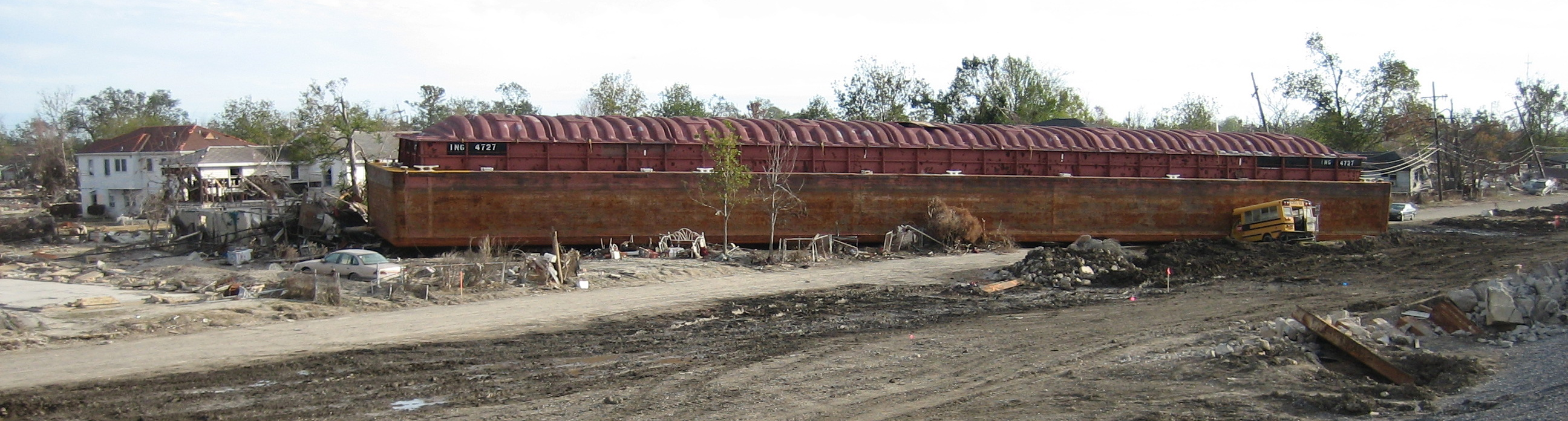
The ING 4727 in the ruins of the Lower 9th Ward of New Orleans. Note the school bus partially beneath the barge.

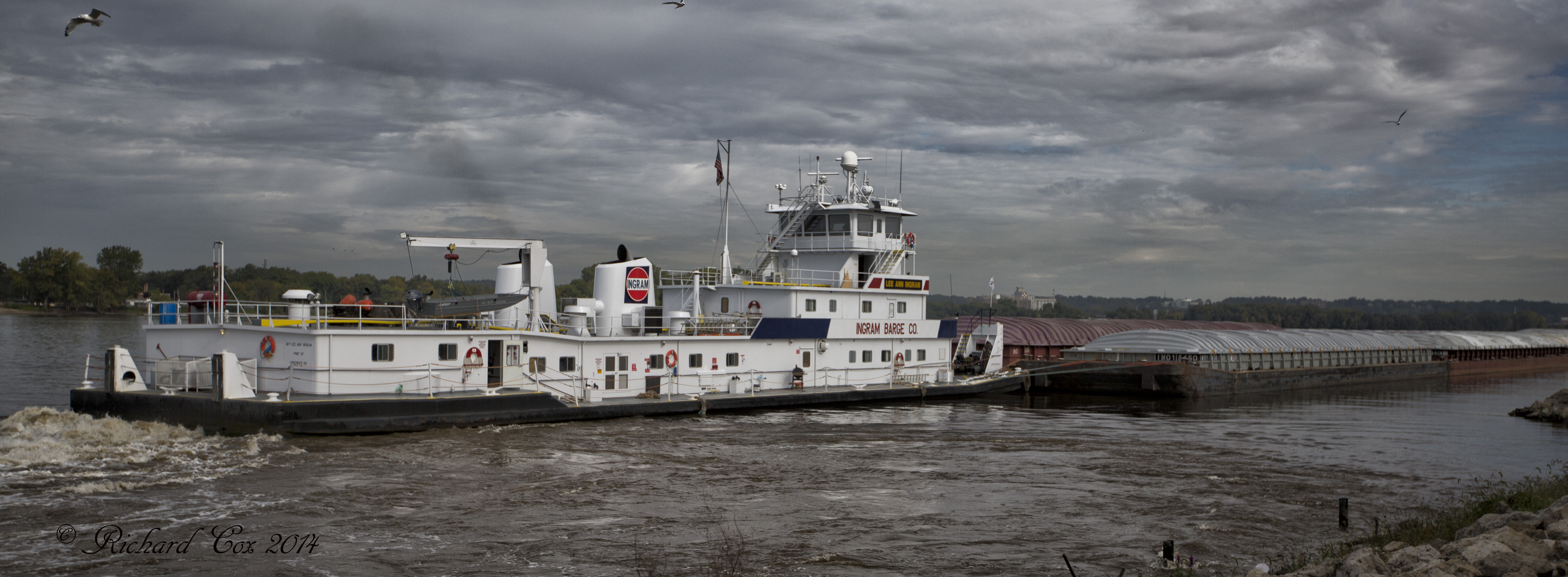
Ingram Barge Co.

== Ingram Barge and Hurricane Katrina ==
Perhaps the most famous Ingram barge was ING 4727, which broke free of its moorings during Hurricane Katrina and landed in what had been a residential neighborhood of the Lower 9th Ward of New Orleans, Louisiana. It was suggested that the ING 4727 was responsible for the major breach in the Industrial Canal, although several major studies concluded otherwise. The ING 4727 was in the custody of Lafarge North America at the time of the hurricane. In 2008, a federal district court in New Orleans found that Ingram Barge was not responsible or liable for the breakaway of the ING 4727. In 2009, the U.S. Court of Appeals for the Fifth Circuit dismissed an appeal of the district court’s ruling, thereby officially ending Ingram Barge’s involvement in the ING 4727 litigation.

== Competition ==
Competition includes Kirby, American Commercial Barge Line, Higman Barge and ARTCO.

== Gallery ==
M/V Bill Berry of the Ingram Barge Company pushing cargo barges up the Mississippi River at Dubuque, Iowa

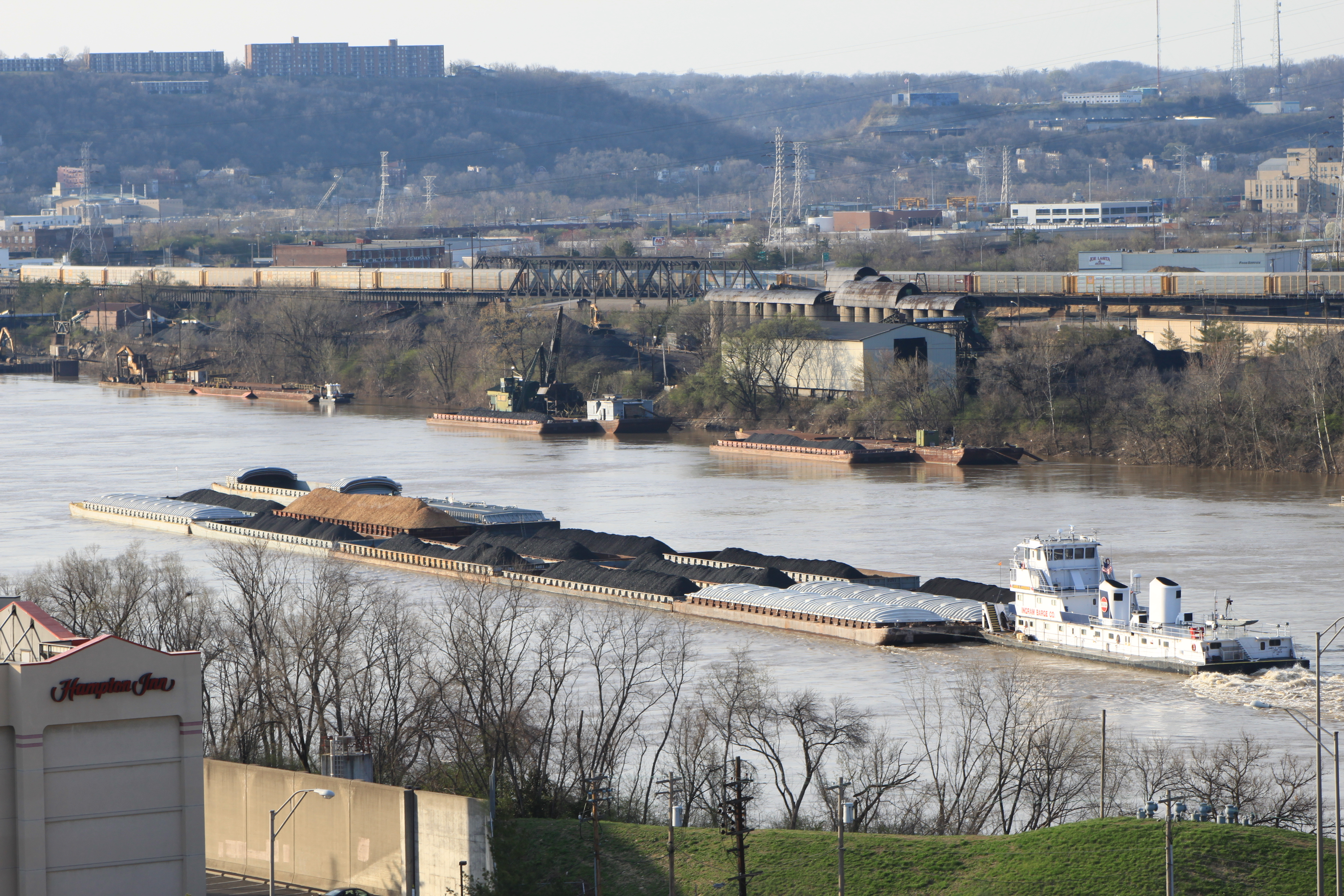
James E. Anderson pushing coal and sand on the Ohio River at Cincinnati, Ohio

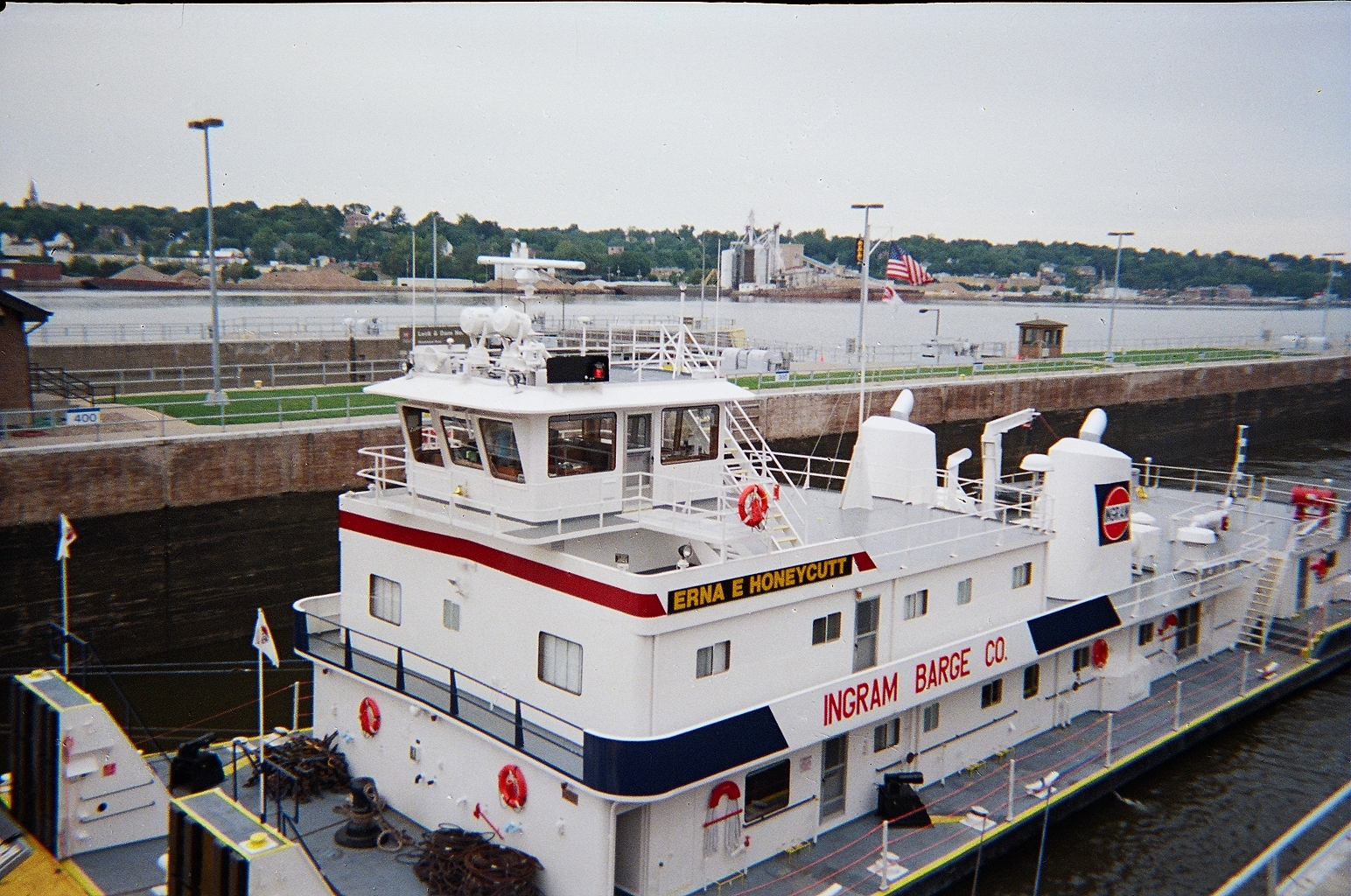
Ingram Barge Company towboat Erna E. Honeycutt at Lock and Dam No. 15.
