= Gordon Hartogensis =

American businessman (born 1970)

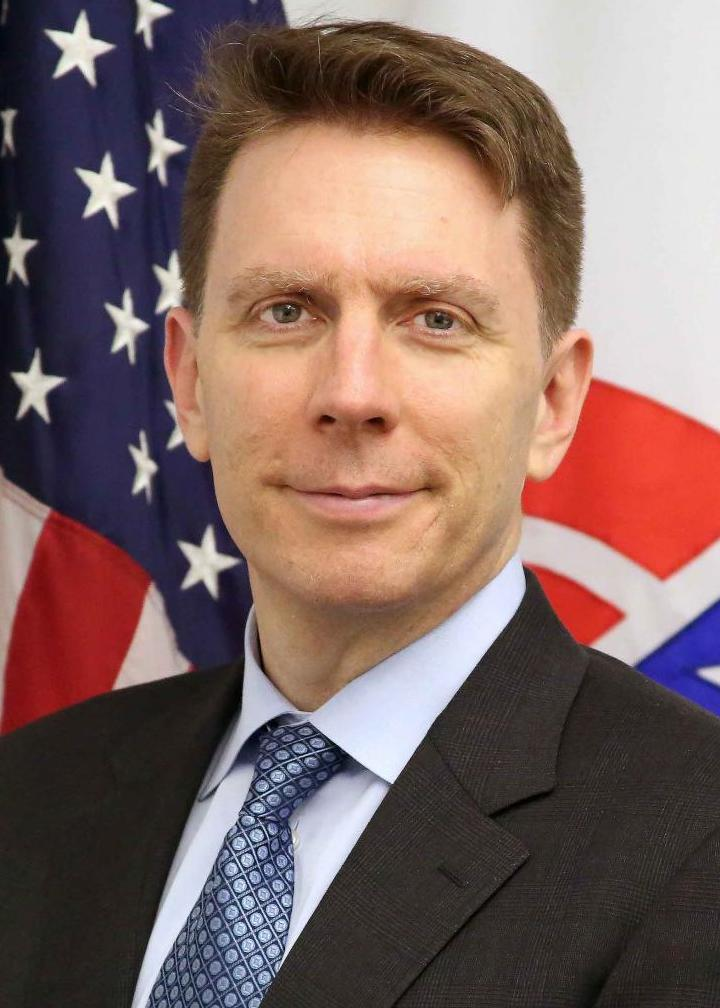

16th Director of the Pension Benefit Guaranty Corporation (PBGC)
- In office May 15, 2019 – April 30, 2024
- President: Donald Trump; Joe Biden
- Preceded by: Thomas Reeder
- Succeeded by: Janet Dhillon

Personal details
- Born: June 17, 1970 (age 56)
- Party: Republican
- Spouse: Grace Chao
- Education: Stanford University (BS in Computer Science); Columbia University (MS in Technology Management)

Gordon Hartogensis (born June 17, 1970) is an American businessman, investor, and government official who served as the 16th Director of the Pension Benefit Guaranty Corporation (PBGC) from 2019 to 2024. In May 2025, he received the Public Service Award from the International Foundation of Employee Benefit Plans (IFEBP) for his leadership of the PBGC during the multiemployer pension crisis.

== Business career ==
Hartogensis left a brief career at Credit Suisse in 1993 to join two classmates from Stanford as an equal partner in a startup supply chain management software company called Petrolsoft Corporation. After the company was acquired by Aspen Technology, Hartogensis served in a leadership role until June 2002.

Shortly after his departure from Aspen, Hartogensis founded and led Auric Technology, a customer relationship management (CRM) software company. Auric was sold to Telnorm in 2011.

After the sale of Auric Technology, Hartogensis became an angel investor who funded and advised several technology startup companies.

== Pension Benefit Guaranty Corporation (PBGC) ==
Hartogensis was nominated for the position of Director of the Pension Benefit Guaranty Corporation on May 15, 2018. He was confirmed for a five-year term by the United States Senate on April 30, 2019, by a vote of 72–27. He was sworn in as Director on May 15, 2019.

When Hartogensis took the helm of the PBGC in 2019, the agency's multiemployer insurance program was projected to be insolvent by 2025 and had a financial deficit of over 65 billion dollars. He worked with both parties in Congress to try to find a bipartisan solution to the crisis, and he testified before the Senate Finance Committee in December 2019. The American Rescue Plan Act of 2021 which was signed into law by President Biden on March 11, 2021, provided $86 billion to address the multiemployer pension crisis. The law created Special Financial Assistance (SFA), a rescue program for financially troubled multiemployer pension plans. The SFA program was implemented by the PBGC under Hartogensis' leadership.

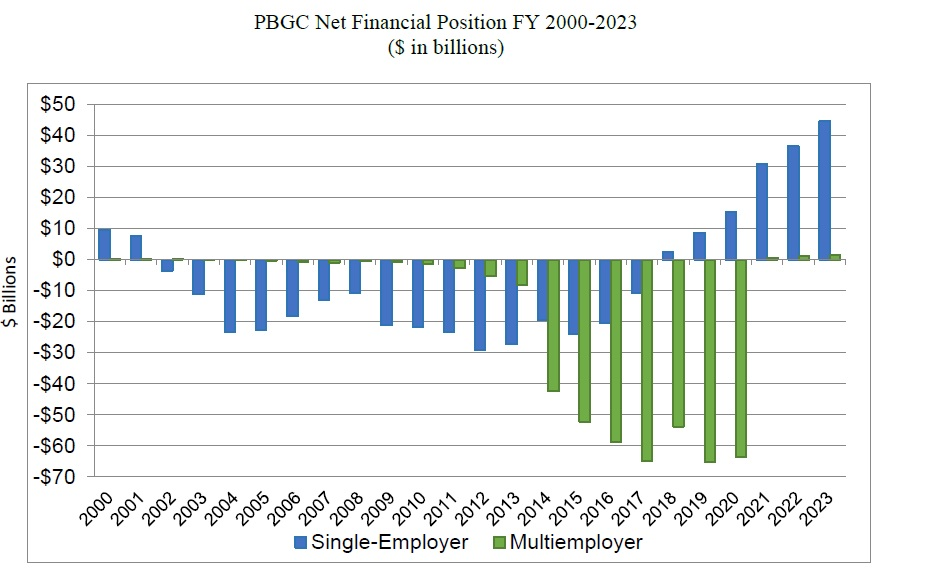
Annual financial position of PBGC single-employer and multiemployer insurance programs 2000–2023

PBGC's 2021 annual report reflected the impact of SFA, and the agency reported positive financial positions in both its single-employer and multiemployer insurance programs for the first time in over 20 years. As a result, the Government Accountability Office (GAO) removed PBGC from its High-Risk List for the first time since 2003.

On July 13, 2022, the Partnership for Public Service rated PBGC number one in "2021 Best Places to Work in the Federal Government" among small agencies. Hartogensis accepted the award on behalf of PBGC.

In 2023, Hartogensis supervised the agency's move to a new headquarters in the Portals II office building near The Wharf (Washington, D.C.).

His five-year term at the PBGC ended on April 30, 2024.

== Awards and honors ==
International Foundation of Employee Benefit Plans (IFEBP) 2025 Public Service Award

== Personal life ==
Hartogensis is married to Grace Chao, the sister of Elaine Chao, the Secretary of Labor under George W. Bush and the Secretary of Transportation under Donald Trump.

Hartogensis is the brother-in-law of Mitch McConnell, the former leader of the Senate Republican Conference.
