= Brownlee O. Currey Jr. =

American businessman (1928–2020)

- Born: Brownlee Owen Currey Jr. August 14, 1928; Nashville, Tennessee, U.S.
- Died: March 18, 2020 (aged 91); Nashville, Tennessee, U.S.
- Occupation: Businessman
- Spouse: Agneta Currey
- Children: Christian Brownlee Currey; Stephanie Currey Ingram and Frances Currey Briggs
- Parent: Brownlee O. Currey
- Relatives: John R. Ingram (son-in-law)

Brownlee Owen Currey Jr. (August 14, 1928 – March 18, 2020) was an American businessman and philanthropist.

== Early life ==
Currey was born in Nashville on August 14, 1928. Currey's father, Brownlee O. Currey, was the owner of the conservative newspaper Nashville Banner.

== Career ==
Currey co-founded Equitable Securities with his father, Brownlee O. Currey. In 1967, it merged with American Express, and he received a sizeable stock portfolio in the company. In 1979, he bought the Nashville Banner from the Gannett Company, and sold it back to them in 1998, for an additional $25 million. He sat on the Board of Directors of Thomas Nelson, where he held a $2.3 million stake. He served as President of Currey Investments. He served as Chairman of the Board of OCC, Inc., the Star Communications's principal subsidiary, since 1989.

== Philanthropy ==
Currey's donations have helped build Montgomery Bell Academy's Currey Gymnasium, Vanderbilt University's Brownlee O. Currey Jr. Tennis Center, and the Currey Ingram Academy in Williamson County, Tennessee. He served as Chairman of the Board of Trustees of the United States Equestrian Team and as a Trustee of the Phelps Media Group, a public relations and marketing firm dedicated to the equestrian industry. He also sat on the Board of Trustees of the National Foundation for Facial Reconstruction, the International Tennis Hall of Fame, and Vanderbilt University. Professor Richard L. Daft is the Brownlee O. Currey Jr. Professor of Management at Vanderbilt, as is Professor Bruce Barry. The Brownlee O. Currey Jr. Gallery at the Watkins College of Art, Design & Film in Nashville is named in his honor.

== Personal life ==
Currey was married to Agneta Currey. They had a son, Christian Brownlee Currey, and two daughters, Stephanie Currey Ingram (married to John R. Ingram) and Frances Currey Briggs. They owned River Circle Farm in Williamson County, a 300-plus-acre property around the Harpeth River. They also owned a home in Manhattan, Southampton, New York and Wellington, Florida. He was an avid tennis player. In 2002, he was named the tenth richest person in Middle Tennessee. He died on March 18, 2020, aged 91.
