= E. Bronson Ingram II =

American businessman (1931–1995)

- Born: Erskine Bronson Ingram II; November 27, 1931; Saint Paul, Minnesota, U.S.
- Died: June 15, 1995 (aged 63)
- Education: Phillips Academy; Montgomery Bell Academy
- Alma mater: Princeton University
- Occupation: Businessman
- Spouse: Martha Robinson Rivers
- Children: David Bronson Ingram; Orrin H. Ingram II; John R. Ingram; Robin Ingram Patton
- Parent(s): Orrin Henry Ingram, Sr. Hortense Bigelow Ingram
- Relatives: Orrin Henry Ingram (paternal great-grandfather); Julius Ingram (paternal great-great-uncle); Erskine B. Ingram (paternal grandfather); Frederic B. Ingram (brother); Ingrid Goude (sister-in-law); Sarah LeBrun Ingram (daughter-in-law)

E. Bronson Ingram II (1931–1995) was an American billionaire heir and business executive. He served as the Chairman of Ingram Industries from 1963 to 1995. He was a director and large shareholder of Weyerhaeuser. He was tried and acquitted of corruption regarding a Chicago sewage deal in the 1970s.

== Early life ==
Erskine Bronson Ingram II was born in Saint Paul, Minnesota on November 27, 1931, the son of millionaire businessman Orrin Henry Ingram, Sr. and Hortense Bigelow Ingram. He was named after his grandfather. His family moved to Nashville, Tennessee in 1948.

E. Bronson Ingram was educated at the Phillips Academy and Montgomery Bell Academy. He attended college at Vanderbilt University and transferred to Princeton University, graduating in 1953. At Princeton, he majored in English, and belonged to the Republican Club.

== Career ==
E.B. Ingram joined the United States Navy as a naval officer, when he sailed to Panama on a destroyer until 1955, when he resigned. He then started working for his father's company, the Ingram Oil & Refining Co., later known as the Ingram Corporation. In particular, he managed the company-owned service stations and helped build truck stops where Ingram truckers could sleep, shower, or eat.

After the death of his father in 1963, E.B. Ingram became President and his brother, Frederic B. Ingram, became Chairman of the Ingram Corporation. In 1976, E. Bronson and his brother Frederic were indicted for bribing officials in Illinois for a "$48 million Chicago sewage contract". E.B. Ingram was acquitted but his brother Frederic was convicted. By 1978, they split the company. Frederic kept the Ingram Corporation, which consisted of oil refineries and pipeline system, headquartered in New Orleans.

E.B. Ingram took over the Tennessee Book Company, Ingram Materials Company, Ingram Barge Company, and Bluewater Insurance Company. He called it Ingram Industries. By 1995, the Ingram Barge Company became the Inland Marine Transportation Group, the third-largest inland waterway carrier in the United States. In 1970, the Tennessee Book Company became known as the Ingram Book Company, and by 1995 it controlled 52 percent of the wholesale book distribution market to American retail bookstores. He also founded Ingram Software; in 1985 it acquired Micro D and morphed into Ingram Micro Incorporated. It quickly became the largest distributor of microcomputer hardware and software in the world.

E.B. Ingram Ingram also founded Ingram Entertainment, the largest wholesale distributor of pre-recorded videocassettes.

He served on the Board of Directors of Weyerhaeuser. In 1988, he owned 222,380 shares. He served as the President of the Nashville Area Chamber of Commerce in 1987, and later as Vice-Chairman of the Tennessee Industrial and Agricultural Development Commission.

== Philanthropy ==
E. Bronson Ingram held leadership positions in the Tennessee Performing Arts Center in the late 1970s and the state Bicentennial Celebration of 1996.

He joined the Vanderbilt Board of Trust in 1967, and served as its Chairman from 1991 to 1995. He donated US$25 million to Vanderbilt. Additionally, he helped fundraise US$500 million for the university.

In 1993, he nominated the first African-American accepted for membership in the Belle Meade Country Club. He also supported Inroads and the Nashville Symphony. He was a member and former Chair of the PENCIL Foundation, a non-profit organization whose aim is to improve public education in Nashville. He served as the Chairman of the steering committee of Nashville's Agenda.

== Personal life ==
In 1958, E. Bronson Ingram met Martha Robinson Rivers in New York City, and they got married the same year. They moved to New Orleans, where the Ingram Corporation was headquartered, but moved back to Nashville in 1961. They had three sons, David Bronson Ingram, Orrin H. Ingram II, and John R. Ingram, and one daughter, Robin Ingram Patton.

== Death and legacy ==
E.B. Ingram died of cancer on June 15, 1995. At the time of his death, he was Tennessee's only billionaire and 56th richest person in the United States. Golfer Arnold Palmer was a pallbearer at his funeral. He is buried in Mount Olivet Cemetery. The Vanderbilt-Ingram Cancer Center and the Ingram Studio Arts Center are named for him.

== Bibliography ==
=== About him ===
- Martha Rivers Ingram, E. Bronson Ingram: Complete These Unfinished Tasks of Mine (2001)
