= ING 4727 =

Barge grounded during Hurricane Katrina

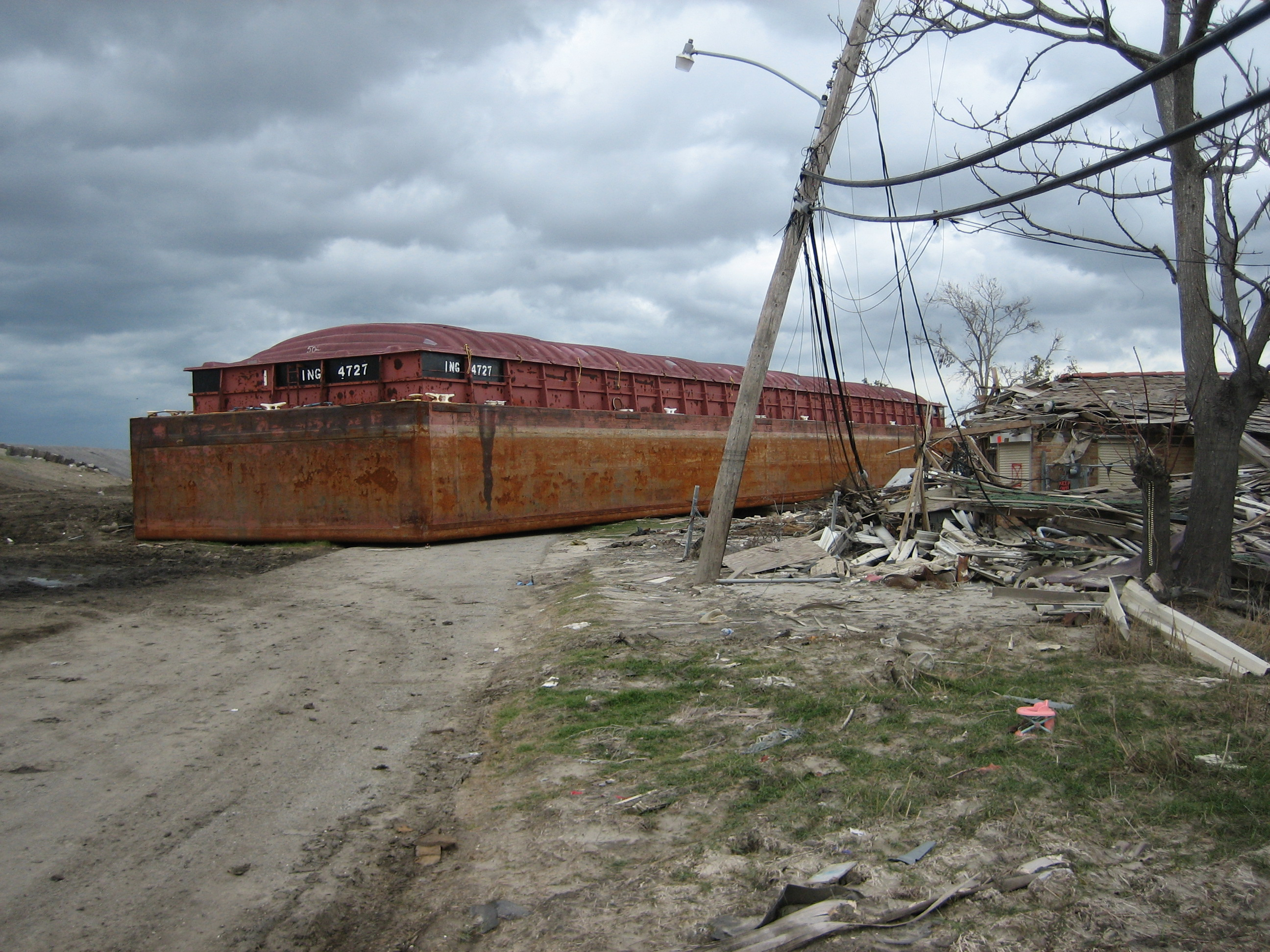
- ING 4727 in mid-December 2005

History

United States
- Owner: Lafarge North America
- Completed: 1990; 36 years ago
- Out of service: August 2005; 21 years ago
- Fate: Broken up and scrapped in March 2006 after running aground in 2005 due to complications from Hurricane Katrina
- Status: March 2006, scrapping completed

General characteristics
- Length: 200 feet (61 m)
- Beam: 35 feet (11 m)
- Draft: 10 feet (3.0 m) when loaded, 1 foot (0.30 m) when empty

ING 4727 was a barge belonging to Ingram Barge Company that became infamous when it went over or through a levee and landed in a residential neighborhood of New Orleans, Louisiana during Hurricane Katrina.

== Background and specifications ==
ING 4727 was built in 1990. It was a dry cargo cover-top barge with a steel hull. It had an overall length of 200 feet (61 m), a beam of 35 feet (11 m) and a height of 12 feet (3.7 m), plus a coaming height of approximately 4 feet (1.2 m) above the deck. The fiberglass covers atop the hopper added another approximately 5 feet (1.5 m) of height. The cargo hopper yielded 84659 cubes of volume. Fully loaded to a draft of 10 feet (3.0 m), the barge could carry 1,877 tons of cargo. Light (empty) draft was 1 foot 4 1/2 inches (0.419 m).

== ING 4727 and Hurricane Katrina ==
Shortly before Katrina, ING 4727 was under charter by Lafarge North America, having recently delivered a load of cement, and was reportedly empty just before the storm. ING 4727 was reportedly in the Mississippi River-Gulf Outlet Canal in New Orleans when the storm hit. Evidently not secured adequately for hurricane conditions, the barge found its way into the Industrial Canal (also known as the Inner Harbor Navigational Canal) where it went through a breach into the Lower 9th Ward neighborhood.

While many other vessels in southeast Louisiana broke their moorings during the storm, ING 4727 became particularly notable both due to its size and because of where it landed. Although its dimensions are standard for barges in commerce on the Mississippi River System (of which the Industrial Canal is a part), it is larger than most Louisianan houses. During and right after the storm, ING 4727 was moved around by currents in the flooded neighborhood, smashing houses and cars beneath it in an area of several city blocks.

== Speculation on the barge's role ==
Many locals blame the barge for the catastrophic inundation of the area. Some lawyers have blamed the barge, including its owners and the cement terminal that had moored the barge and which had the barge in its care, custody, and control at the time of the hurricane.

A week after the storm Army Corps of Engineers project manager Al Naomi gave his preliminary impression, saying, "One would think it's the barge that did it," and confirming that the barge striking the floodwalls would have "precipitated a tremendous collapse". However, in the preliminary report presented to Congress, experts say that the barge was drawn through an existing hole in the floodwall, and that it was the topping of the Industrial Canal floodwall, not the barge, that caused the break. The LSU report subsequently found that overtopping did not occur, rather, design failures precipited the levee failures.

By late 2007, several investigations were completed that included analysis of the question of whether the barge had a causative role in one or more of the failures in the floodwalls atop the Industrial Canal levees, or whether it came into the city from an already-existing breach. The investigators funded by the National Science Foundation—from the University of California at Berkeley—concluded that the barge went through an already-existing breach caused by foundation failure of the floodwall. Another group of investigators, funded by the State of Louisiana, came to the same conclusion. Finally, a $20 million study, funded by the Department of Defense/United States Army Corps of Engineers, blamed the Industrial Canal levee failures on overtopping of the floodwalls by the storm surge and resulting scour and undermining of the foundation and not the barge.

There is also speculation that the barge may have caused the other nearby breaches in the Industrial Canal by striking the floodwalls on the other side before bouncing back and going all the way through the levee near the end of Prieur Street, although all the scientists and engineers who investigated the failures regard such speculation as dubious and without any evidentiary basis.

== After Katrina ==
As the Lower 9th Ward was dewatered, ING 4727 at first came to rest atop a number of house sites on the east side of Jourdan Avenue. Hurricane Rita, however, subsequently raised the water level in the Industrial Canal sufficiently to top the still-incomplete levee repairs, reflooding the area and refloating the barge.

As waters were again drained from the area, the barge came to rest a few dozen yards from its earlier location, diagonally across Jourdan Avenue near the intersection of North Roman Street, partially atop former homes and a school bus.

In the months after Katrina, the barge became a morbid tourist attraction for those interested in the devastation.

On 22 February 2006, salvage work began which lifted the barge approximately 4 feet (1.2 m) into the air using inflatable bags so that the bottom of the vessel could be inspected for damage, and on 24 February Titan Maritime began the process of cutting up and removing it from the area. A number of pieces were under court order to be preserved as evidence in pending lawsuits, although that order has been modified to allow for the disposal of all remaining portions of the barge. Removal of the pieces of the barge from the Lower 9th Ward was completed the third week of March 2006.

On 4 June 2007, a federal trial looking into possible liability of Ingram and other parties for damage from the barge began in New Orleans.

On March 31, 2008, Judge Helen Berrigan, Chief Judge for the United States District Court for the Eastern District of Louisiana, issued an opinion that exonerated the barge owner, Ingram Barge Company, from any liability for the ING 4727 breaking free of its moorings during or after Hurricane Katrina passed through the New Orleans area.

== See also ==
- Effect of Hurricane Katrina on New Orleans
- Levee failures in Greater New Orleans, 2005
