= Nashville Repertory Theatre =

Coordinates: 36.13525°N 86.76551°W

- Formation: 1985
- Founders: Mac Pirkle and Martha Rivers Ingram
- Type: Theatre group
- Location: Nashville, Tennessee
- Artistic director: Micah-Shane Brewer
- Website: nashvillerep.org
- Formerly called: Tennessee Repertory Theatre

Nashville Repertory Theatre is a professional, Actors' Equity-affiliated regional theatre company based in Nashville, Tennessee.

Nashville Repertory Theatre was founded as Tennessee Repertory Theatre in 1985 by Mac Pirkle and Martha Rivers Ingram. The first production was Macbeth. The theatre's original home base for production was the 1100-seat James K. Polk Theater in the Tennessee Performing Arts Center. With an annual budget of more than $3 million, Pirkle emphasized the development of new musicals. Dream, a musical revue based on the lyrics of Johnny Mercer, was developed at Tennessee Rep and had a Broadway run in 1997.

After Pirkle's departure from Tennessee Rep in 1999, the leadership of the theatre changed hands frequently. David Grapes was artistic director until 2004, when David Alford took over. In 2007, René Copeland was named artistic director. During this period of transition, Tennessee Rep shifted its production base from the Polk Theater to the 250-seat black box Andrew Johnson Theater, still located within the Tennessee Performing Arts Center. With the production of Sweeney Todd in October 2014, Tennessee Rep was rechristened Nashville Repertory Theatre. Copeland held the artistic director position until her departure in May 2019, after which managing director Drew Ogle assumed leadership. 2021's production of Ragtime marked the Rep's return to the Polk Theater, with the company henceforth producing shows in both the Polk and the Johnson. In 2023 Micah-Shane Brewer was named artistic director of Nashville Rep. In 2024, Brewer's production of Indecent was deemed "the best Nashville Rep production in a decade" by reviewer Jef Ellis, and Brewer's production of A Christmas Carol, which he adapted and directed, was the highest grossing production in the Rep's 40-year history.

== Ingram New Works Project ==
Founded in 2009, Nashville Rep's Ingram New Works Project helps new playwrights develop their work, and has three parts:

- The Lab is a series of monthly workshops with in-house readings of the plays in development.
- The Fellowship invites established playwrights to develop new works and mentor the Lab playwrights. Sarah Ruhl, Christopher Durang, Doug Wright, Donald Margulies, John Patrick Shanley, Steven Dietz, and Theresa Rebeck have all participated.
- The Ingram New Works Festival presents public readings of all the plays under development.
