= Orrin Henry Ingram Sr. =

American businessman (1904–1963)

- Born: June 26, 1904; Eau Claire, Wisconsin, U.S.
- Died: April 25, 1963 (aged 58); Nashville, Tennessee, U.S.
- Occupation: Businessman
- Spouse: Hortense Bigelow
- Children: E. Bronson Ingram II; Frederic B. Ingram; Alice Hooker
- Parent(s): Erskine B. Ingram; Harriet Coggshall
- Relatives: Orrin Henry Ingram (paternal grandfather); Julius Ingram (paternal great-uncle); Martha Rivers Ingram (daughter-in-law); Ingrid Goude (daughter-in-law); Orrin H. Ingram II

Orrin Henry Ingram Sr. (June 26, 1904 – April 25, 1963) was an American heir and businessman.

== Early life ==
Orrin Henry Ingram Sr. was born on June 26, 1904, in Eau Claire, Wisconsin. His father, Erskine B. Ingram, was a lumber heir. His mother was Harriet Coggshall. His parents were members of the Congregational Church.

His paternal grandfather three times removed, David Ingram, had immigrated from Leeds, England, in 1780. His paternal grandfather, Orrin Henry Ingram, was a lumber baron in Wisconsin. His great-uncle, Julius Ingram, was a member of the Wisconsin State Assembly.

== Career ==
In 1928, Ingram ran a textile firm in Tennessee owned by his wife's family. He relocated it to Nashville, Tennessee. By 1937, at the time of the textile strike, he sold half his investment and acquired Wood River Oil and Refining, an oil company based in St. Louis, Missouri.

He was the owner of Ingram Oil & Refining, a chain of 240 gas stations headquartered in Meraux, Louisiana, just outside New Orleans. In 1961, he sold the company to Murphy Oil.

== Philanthropy ==
Ingram served as the Vice President of the Board of Trust of Vanderbilt University in Nashville from 1952 to 1963.

== Personal life ==
Ingram married Hortense Bigelow, the daughter of the president of the St. Paul Fire and Marine Insurance Co. (later known as The Travelers Companies). They resided in White Bear Lake, Minnesota, Hobe Sound, Florida, and Nashville, Tennessee. They had two sons, E. Bronson Ingram II and Frederic B. Ingram, and a daughter, Alice, who married Henry William Hooker.

== Death and legacy ==
He died of a heart attack on April 25, 1963, in Nashville, Tennessee. He was buried at Mount Olivet Cemetery in Nashville.

The Hank Ingram House on the campus of Vanderbilt University was named in his honor in 2006.
