= Golf Club of Tennessee =

Golf complex in Tennessee, USA

Coordinates: 36°4′5″N 87°5′26″W

The Golf Club of Tennessee is a private golf complex located near Nashville in Kingston Springs, Tennessee. It is an 18-hole Tom Fazio course on 317 acres (218 hectares). It was formed in 1988 by billionaire businessman Bronson Ingram along with Toby S. Wilt and George N. Gillett, Jr. It contains a 31,000 square foot (2,900 m^{2}) clubhouse and can accommodate 16 overnight guests including the Ingram Cabin.

As of 2017, Golf Digest rated the course as number 163 of Americas 200 Greatest Golf Courses.
