= Distribution software =

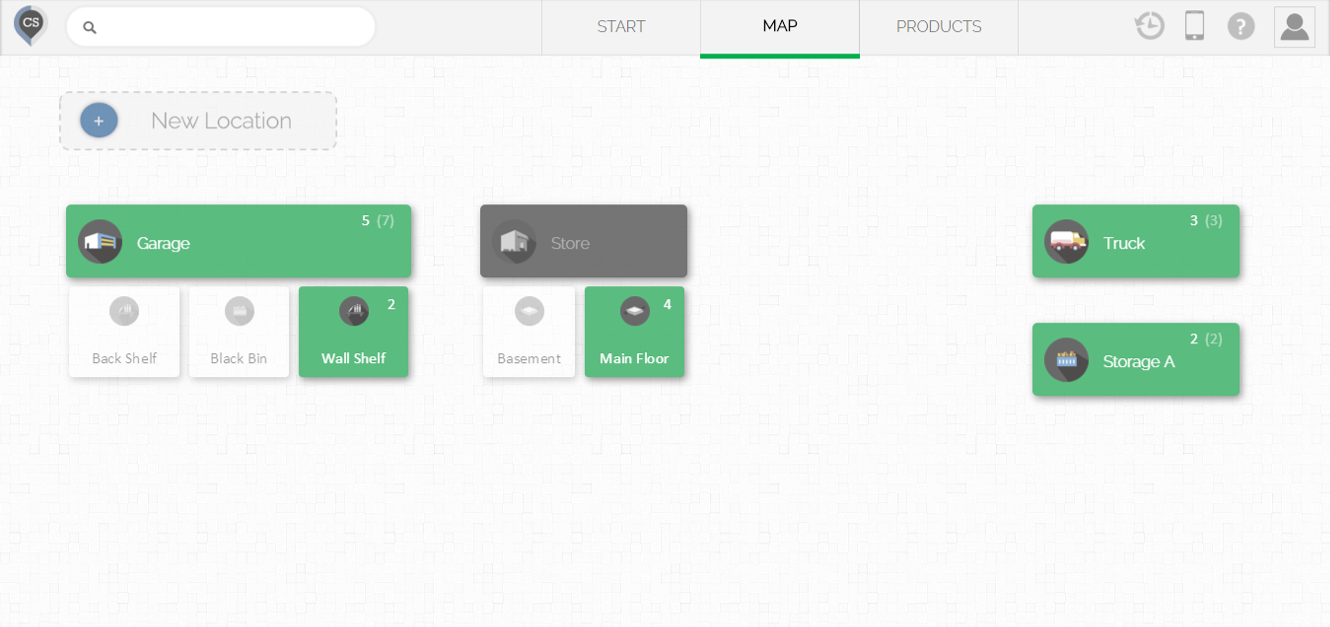
A critical requirement for distribution software is inventory visibility which includes both internal inventory visibility (above) as well as visibility across the supply chain (vendors and customers)

Distribution software supports businesses with order processing, logistics and inventory control, including tasks relating to accounting, purchasing and customer service, supply chain management, sales, customer relationship management, and finance management.

More sophisticated solutions can cover areas such as advanced forecasting and replenishment, warehouse management, pick, pack and shipping, Electronic Data Interchange, and trade spend management.

Distribution software helps companies to manage internal and external resources efficiently by minimizing stockouts while also ensuring that overstocking does not occur.

Cloud-based distribution software began its rise in popularity in approximately 2010. The benefits of cloud-based distribution solutions include the ability to access the application from any device that uses a web browser and cost-savings resulting from reduced hardware requirements.

== See also ==
- Enterprise resource planning
- Document automation
- Inventory control system
- Operations management
- Supply chain management
- Warehouse management system
