= Frederic B. Ingram =

American businessman

Frederic Bigelow Ingram
- Died: August 26, 2015
- Education: Phillips Exeter Academy
- Alma mater: Princeton University; Vanderbilt University
- Occupation: Businessman
- Spouse: Ingrid Goude (1983-2015)
- Children: 3
- Parents: Orrin Henry Ingram, Sr. (father); Hortense Bigelow (mother)
- Relatives: Orrin Henry Ingram (great-grandfather); Julius Ingram (great-great-uncle); Erskine B. Ingram (grandfather); E. Bronson Ingram II (brother); Martha Rivers Ingram (sister-in-law); Orrin H. Ingram II (nephew); John R. Ingram (nephew); David Bronson Ingram (nephew)

Frederic B. Ingram (a.k.a. Fritz Ingram) was an American-born Irish heir and businessman. Born to the Ingram dynasty of Nashville, Tennessee, he was charged with bribing government officials over a sewage contract in Chicago, and jailed for 16 months. His sentence was commuted by President Jimmy Carter in 1980. Shortly after, he renounced his United States citizenship and became an Irish citizen. He resided in California.

== Early life ==
Frederic B. Ingram grew up in Nashville, Tennessee. His father, Orrin Henry Ingram, Sr., was a business magnate. His mother is Hortense Bigelow. He had a brother, E. Bronson Ingram II, who died in 1995.

His great-great-great-grandfather, David Ingram, had immigrated from Leeds, England, in 1780. His great-grandfather, Orrin Henry Ingram, was a lumber baron in Wisconsin. His grandfather, Erskine B. Ingram, was a lumber baron and businessman.

Ingram was educated at Phillips Exeter Academy. He attended Vanderbilt University and Princeton University, graduating in 1952.

== Career ==
Ingram inherited Ingram Corp. with his brother from their late father in 1963. He served as its Chairman. In 1970, he acquired the Great Plains Construction Co., an oil and gas pipeline and water line construction company headquartered in Lubbock, Texas, which became a subsidiary of the Ingram Corp. The subsidiary built sections 5 and 6 of the Trans-Alaska Pipeline System; it also built a pipeline in Iran and bid for pipeline contracts in Saudi Arabia.

In 1976, Ingram and his brother were indicted for bribing officials in Illinois for a "$48 million Chicago sewage contract". Ingram pleaded innocent. However, while his brother was acquitted, Ingram was charged on 29 counts and sentenced to four years in prison. He was jailed in federal prison for 16 months. His sentence was commuted by President Jimmy Carter in December 1980, and he was released in May 1981.

His business ties were separated from his brother's in 1980; Ingram took the oil interests while his brother kept the distribution subsidiary. However, he "failed" after he lost $100 million over six weeks in 1983.

In 1985, Ingram sued William F. Earthman, the former Chairman of the Commerce Union Bank, a Nashville-based bank, over the repayment of a private loan. He won the lawsuit.

== Personal life and death ==
Ingram renounced his United States citizenship and moved to Monaco after his sentence was commuted. He later moved to Ireland and became an Irish citizen. He lived off the income from a Liechtenstein-based US$150 million trust fund until Ingram Corp. was reduced to insolvency in 1984 by large oil trading losses.

In 1982, Ingram was accused of raping a 25-year-old woman in New Orleans, where he resided. She received US$350,000 from a jury in the Civil District Court of Orleans Parish.

Ingram was married to Ingrid Goude, a Swedish-born model and actress. They resided in Beverly Hills, California.

Ingram died on August 26, 2015.

== See also ==
- List of people pardoned or granted clemency by the president of the United States
