= Lightning Source =

American book printer and distributor

Lightning Source Inc.
- Type: Private
- Industry: Printing; Ebooks
- Founded: 1996
- Headquarters: La Vergne, Tennessee, United States
- Key people: David Taylor, president
- Products: Books, wholesale and retail distribution
- Website: www.lightningsource.com

Lightning Source is a printer and distributor of print-on-demand books. The company is a business unit of Ingram Content Group. Originally incorporated in 1996 as Lightning Print Inc., the company is headquartered in La Vergne, Tennessee, United States. Its UK operations are based in Milton Keynes. They also have operations in Maurepas, France and Melbourne, Australia.

IngramSpark is a service operated by Lightning Source to cater for the needs of independent publishers and authors. Since it launched in 2013, IngramSpark has registered more than 7 million books, with 4,000 new books added each day.

== Espresso Book Machine ==
The Espresso Book Machine 2.0 is a compact (3.8 feet (120 cm) wide by 2.7 feet (82 cm) deep by 4.5 feet (140 cm) high) book-printing kiosk that can be installed in a bookshop or public place to print, bind and cut books on demand while the customer waits. The EBM 2.0 can download encrypted book files from Lightning Source (LS). Publishers must specifically give permission in order for their titles to be included in the scheme.

The EBM project can theoretically allow faster access to LS print-on-demand books in regions where there is no existing LS plant, and where shipping times would otherwise create significant supply delays. It also allows large bookshops to offer their customers almost immediate access to a wider range of titles than could be held onsite. However, to date, uptake of the Espresso Book Machine system has been low.

== E-book services ==
Lightning Source has an e-book supply system that can serve up protected PDF copies of books from their library through a vendor's site if a publisher chooses to participate.

Although the scheme originally allowed electronic LS editions to be sold on Amazon alongside "conventional" print-on-demand editions, Amazon withdrew from the scheme. Lightning Source still offers their e-book on-demand service to publishers who have a suitable vendor website, and supplies eBooks to their retail partners Powells.com, Ebookmall.com, Diesel-ebooks.com, Fictionwise.com, Booksonboard.com and eBooksAboutEverything.com, but have no online retail outlet themselves to sell eBooks.

In March 2010 Ingram Digital (a wholesaler part of the same group) warned its customers it might not be able to sell them e-books, as most large publishers were moving from the wholesale model (publishers offer wholesale discounts, and the final price is determined by retailers) to the agency model (publishers set the retail price and offer agents a commission, so retailers earn more by buying directly from the publisher rather than via a wholesaler). This was triggered by the eBook pricing dispute between Amazon and Macmillan, and the imminent launch of the iPad. However, in April 2012 the U.S. Department of Justice sued Apple, Macmillan, and others on the basis that the agency model was anti-competitive and a form of collusion used to fix the price of e-books. As of April 2012, Ingram Digital was still supplying e-books via its CoreSource programme.
