= Ingram Industries =

American manufacturing company

- Company type: Private
- Founded: 1978; 48 years ago
- Founder: E. Bronson Ingram II
- Headquarters: Belle Meade, Tennessee, United States
- Key people: Orrin H. Ingram II (CEO)
- Revenue: US$2.12 billion (2014)
- Owner: Ingram family
- Number of employees: 5,000

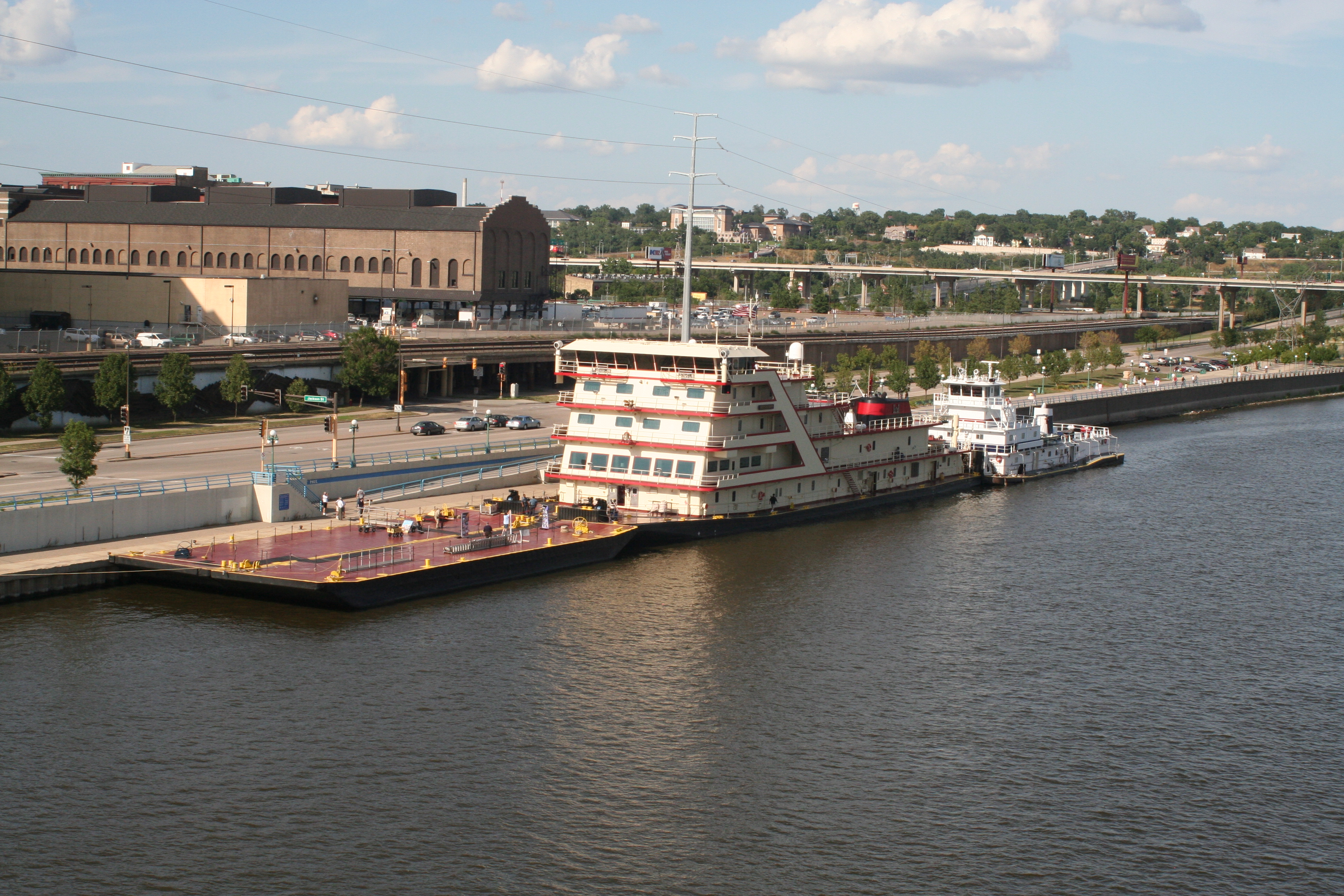
Ingram's Bruce R. Birmingham (on right, behind M/V Mississippi)

Ingram Industries is a manufacturing company headquartered in Nashville, Tennessee. The company consists of diversified businesses in marine transportation aggregate supply, book distribution, print on demand book manufacturing, management and distribution services. Ingram's businesses are divided into two units: Ingram Marine Group and Ingram Content Group.

== History ==
The company was founded by E. Bronson Ingram II in 1978. It is headquartered at One Belle Meade Place, in Belle Meade, West Nashville.

Its chief executive officer is Orrin H. Ingram II.

In 1989, Micro D, a wholesaler of personal computer products, agreed to be acquired by Ingram Industries in a $43.9-million deal. It evolved into Ingram Micro.

In 2002, Ingram Industries acquired Midland Enterprises, a company that owns 2,300 barges and 80 towboats. Ingram made the acquisition for $230 million and assumed $135 million of debt as a result.

== Subsidiaries ==
Ingram Industries includes Ingram Barge Company, Ingram Content Group, and Ingram Entertainment.
