= Ingram Entertainment =

American distributor of home entertainment

Ingram Entertainment Inc.
- Company type: Private
- Founded: 1981; 45 years ago
- Founder: David Bronson Ingram
- Headquarters: La Vergne, Tennessee, United States
- Number of locations: 14
- Key people: David Bronson Ingram (chairman & president); Bob Webb (president and CEO); Donnie Daniels (CFO)
- Products: DVD, Blu-ray, Videogames, Audiobooks, and Accessessories
- Number of employees: 540 associates with an average tenure of fifteen years
- Subsidiaries: DBI Beverage, Monarch Home Entertainment
- Website: www.ingramentertainment.com

Ingram Entertainment Inc. was an American distributor of home entertainment products, like DVDs, audiobooks, video game software and hardware. Ingram Entertainment Inc, was at one time the nation's largest distributor of DVD software.

== History ==
The company had 14 locations in the United States and offer services to video game stores, video game and electronic stores, supermarkets, drugstores, and internet retailers. Ingram Entertainment Holdings Inc. had total revenues of $616 million in 2010 processing approximately 100 million units of DVD and video game software. The company had an affiliate: video distributor Monarch Home Video.

== Assets ==
On January 11, 2019, Ingram purchased the music & video retail sales division and assets of Charlotte, North Carolina, based book distributor Baker & Taylor. Terms of the deal were not disclosed.

Monarch Home Entertainment was created in 1989 by Ingram Entertainment.

Ingram Entertainment sold beverage distributor DBI Beverage to Reyes Beverage Group in 2019.

In September 2023 the company announced its closure. “Expenses are exceeding sales [so it's] time to exit,” chairman and CEO David Ingram told Media Play News.
