= Ingram Content Group =

American service provider to the book publishing industry

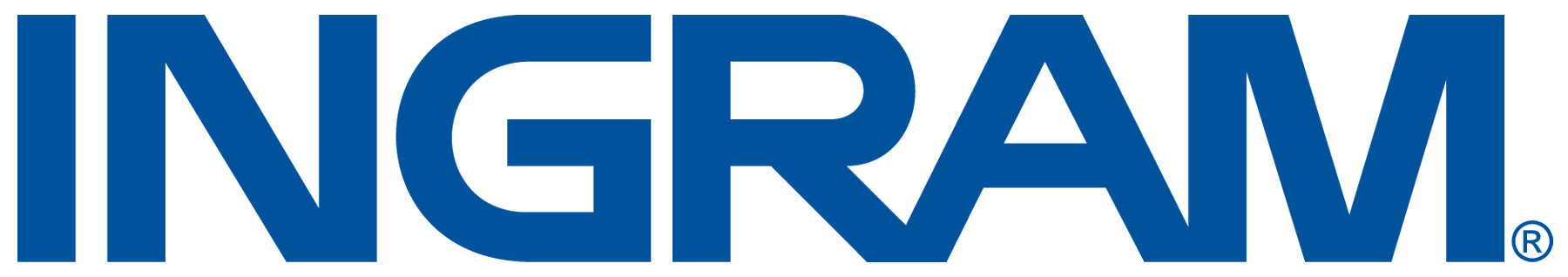
- Founded: 2009; 17 years ago
- Headquarters: La Vergne, Tennessee, United States
- Key people: John R. Ingram (chairman) Shawn Morin (CEO)
- Services: Book distribution
- Parent: Ingram Industries
- Website: ingramcontent.com

Ingram Content Group is an American service provider to the book publishing industry, based in La Vergne, Tennessee. It is a subsidiary of Ingram Industries.

Shawn Morin is CEO, and John R. Ingram is chairman of Ingram Industries.

== History ==
The Ingram Content Group was formed in 2009 when Ingram Lightning Group merged with Ingram Digital Group. Ingram Content Group's operating units are Ingram Book Company, Ingram International Inc., Ingram Library Services Inc., Ingram Publisher Services Inc., Ingram Periodicals Inc., Ingram Digital, Lightning Source Inc., Spring Arbor Distributors Inc., and Tennessee Book Company LLC.

During 1999 and 2000, Ingram Industries negotiated a sale to Barnes & Noble which was ultimately withdrawn after pressure from independent bookstores and the American Booksellers Association.

In July 2006, Ingram Industries acquired VitalSource Technologies, Inc, which it later sold to Francisco Partners in April 2021.

In June 2014, the company, in conjunction with Hachette Book Group USA and Perseus Books Group, announced that Hachette would buy Perseus, and then sell that company's client services businesses to Ingram, with financial details undisclosed.

On April 4, 2016, John Ingram stepped down as CEO, and was succeeded by Shawn Morin.

In December 2018, it was reported that Ingram Content extended an offer to purchase book distributor Baker & Taylor's retail and wholesale business from their parent company, Follett. As a result, Ingram informed the Federal Trade Commission (FTC) of the proposed deal, and a preliminary investigation was started. The FTC contacted leading book retailers, Amazon, and major and independent book publishers to help determine the impact, if any, from the sale. This deal fell through and Baker & Taylor left the retail book wholesale market after divesting some of its entertainment product distribution to Ingram Entertainment in January 2019. Baker & Taylor's departure left Ingram Book Company as the only major book wholesaler to retail stores in the United States.

== Services ==
The company has the industry's largest active book inventory with access to 7.5 million titles. The markets they serve include booksellers, librarians, educators and specialty retailers. Ingram employs approximately 3,000 people worldwide.

Ingram Content Group distributes to independent book stores throughout the United States, from warehouses in Oregon, Pennsylvania, Tennessee, and Indiana. It also operates a print-on-demand business, under the Lightning Source brand, with facilities in Tennessee, Pennsylvania, Ohio, California, United Kingdom, France and Australia. The company also provides full service distribution, including sales and marketing services via its Ingram Publisher Services division.

In addition to print distribution, Ingram also provides digital content services and distribution through CoreSource, VitalSource, and MyiLibrary.

In 2015, Ingram purchased Aer.io which allows websites based in the US to sell books from the Ingram catalog.

In June 2017, Ingram purchased Book Network International Limited, a book distributor based in Plymouth, U.K., from Rowman & Littlefield. Ingram subsequently formed Ingram Publisher Services UK (IPS UK) from these operations. Initially utilising the Plymouth facility, IPS UK relocated its primary UK warehousing and distribution operations to Milton Keynes, completing the move in 2020.

In June 2022, Ingram entered into a partnership with bookseller/social media site, Tertulia, to sell its library of books.

== See also ==
- List of book distributors
