= Ingrid Goude =

Swedish actress and model (born 1937)

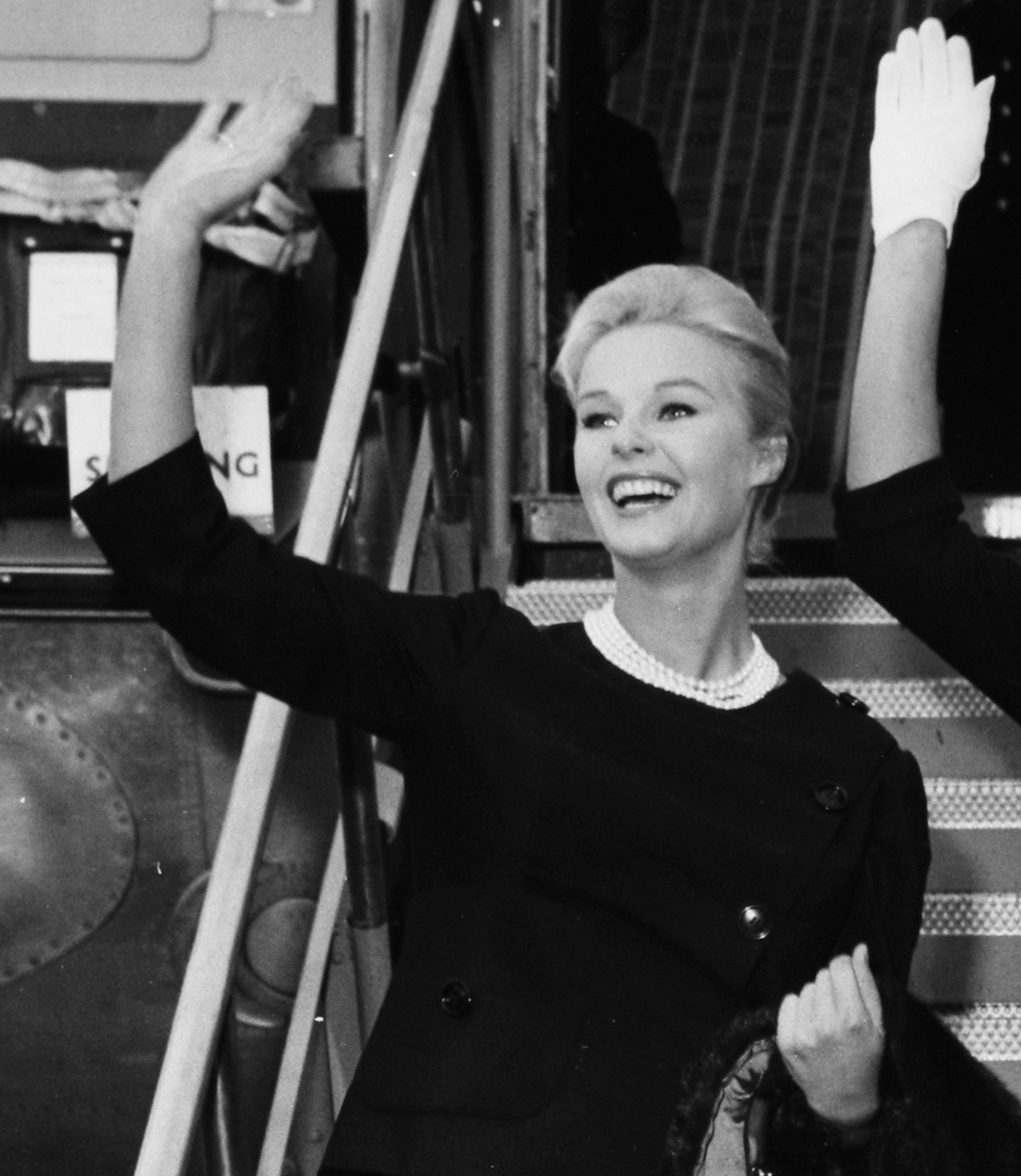
- Goude in Copenhagen, 1958
- Born: May 26, 1937 (age 89); Sandviken, Gävleborg County, Sweden
- Occupations: beauty contestant; actress
- Spouses: Jerome K. Ohrbach (m. 1962; div. 1976); Arthur Ryan (m. 1976; div. 1982); Frederic B. Ingram (m. 1983; died 2015)
- Children: 4
- Beauty pageant titleholder
- Title: Miss Sweden 1956
- Years active: 1957–1961
- Major competitions: Miss Sweden 1956 (Winner); Miss Universe 1956 (2nd Runner-Up)

Ingrid Goude (born May 26, 1937) is a Swedish retired actress, model and beauty pageant titleholder. She became an actress in B-movie and sci-fi motion pictures of the late 1950s and early 1960s. Her parents were Edward K. Goude, the manager of a steel plant in Sandviken, and Valdy Goude.

== Film contract ==
Goude won the 1956 Miss Sweden beauty pageant. As second runner-up in Miss Universe 1956, and 1st runner-up in Miss Europe contests, Goude signed a Universal Pictures film contract on July 25, 1956. The studio also offered contracts to the 1956 Miss Universe, Carol Morris, and Marina Orschel of Germany, the 1st runner-up. Universal picked up her option during Christmas 1956 and requested that she report back to the studio on January 8.

Goude won the right to manage all of the earnings from her Universal contract in September 1957. The contract was paying $250 per week at the time. It called for her to invest 20% of her earnings in government bonds. A superior court judge in Los Angeles waived this proviso. He noted that Goude would turn twenty-one on May 26, 1958. Also, he noted, the contract was signed thirteen months earlier, and she had lived within her means since then. Universal started her at $150 weekly with a maturation salary of $800 a week. After eighteen months with Universal, Goude asked for and was granted her release from her studio agreement in January 1958.

== Actress ==
Neither Morris nor Orschel was successful in movies. Goude earned a role as a secretary in The Big Beat (1958). The film is studded with musicians such as Harry James and Fats Domino in its cast. She played Beulah, a bride, in Once Upon a Horse... (1958). The comedy was written by Dan Rowan and Dick Martin and produced by Universal. Goude trained for this part at the Los Angeles Athletic Club. There she learned to use boxing gloves under the supervision of Duke Llewellyn, athletic director.

In July 1957 Goude went to Denver, Colorado, to play hostess for Night Passage (1957), a motion picture starring James Stewart and Audie Murphy.

Goude was cast with James Best and Ken Curtis in January 1959, in The Killer Shrews. A production of the Hollywood Pictures Corporation, the sci-fi movie was filmed on location in Dallas, Texas and was backed financially by Gordon and B.R. McClendon. Goude still had a Swedish accent, which presented a contradiction to the American accent of her onscreen father Baruch Lumet. The film's dialogue makes playful pokes at this, presenting the reason for her accent as an unrevealed secret.

== Television ==
In her brief career, Goude played in several television series, including Flight (1957), Steve Canyon (1959–1960), Johnny Staccato (1959), The Bob Cummings Show (syndicated as Love That Bob), and The Best of the Post (1961).

== Personal life ==
Goude married Jerome K. Ohrbach (d. 1990) in Palm Springs, California, in April 1962. He was president of Ohrbach's department stores. The couple made their home in Beverly Hills after a honeymoon in Europe. She was married to Arthur Ryan from 1976 to 1982. After her divorce, she married Fritz Ingram (d. 2015).
