= Ingram (surname) =

- Language: English

Origin
- Language: English
- Meaning: Ing + hraban (raven)
- Region of origin: England

Other names
- Variant forms: Ingeram, Ingelham, Ingyon, Ingraham

Ingram or Ingrams is an English surname, from the given name Ingram.

== People ==
- A. I. Gordon-Ingram, major in the Korean War, B Company commander in the Battle of Hill 282
- Adam Ingram (disambiguation)
  - Adam Ingram (born 1951), Scottish National Party (SNP) politician and MSP
  - Adam Ingram (born 1947), British Labour Party politician and MP
- Alex Ingram (1945–2022), Scottish footballer
- Arthur Ingram (disambiguation)
  - Sir Arthur Ingram (ca.1565–1642) was an English investor, landowner and politician
  - Arthur Ingram, 3rd Viscount of Irvine (1666–1702), English Member of Parliament and peer
  - Arthur Ingram, 6th Viscount of Irvine (1689–1736), British landowner and politician
  - Arthur B. Ingram, 19th century American farmer and politician
- Andre Ingram, (born 1985), American professional basketball player
- Andrew B. Ingram (1851–1934), Ontario real estate agent and political figure
- Barbara Ingram (1947–1994), American R&B singer/songwriter
- Bill Ingram (1898–1943), American college football coach
- Brandon Ingram (born 1997), American basketball player
- Sir Bruce Sterling Ingram, (1877–1963), British Publishing entrepreneur, philanthropist and editor of The Illustrated London News
- Byron Ingram (born 1964), American football player
- Catherine Ingram, American politician
- Charles Ingram (disambiguation)
  - Charles Ingram (1696–1748), British soldier and politician
  - Charles Ingram, 9th Viscount of Irvine (1727–1778), British courtier and politician, son of the above
  - Charles Ingram (1833–1868), British doctor of medicine and cricketer
  - C. A. Ingram (1867–1937), American lawyer and legislator
  - Charles Ingram, a former British Army major convicted of deception after cheating on Who Wants to Be a Millionaire? (UK game show)
- Chris Ingram (born 1976), Welsh footballer
- Clara Ingram Judson (1879–1960), American author who wrote over 70 books for children
- Cliff Raven Ingram (1932–2001), American artist and tattoo pioneer
- Clint Ingram (born 1983), American football player
- Colin Ingram (born 1985), South African cricketer
- Collingwood Ingram (1880–1981), British planting collector and breeder and author of garden books
- Connor Ingram (born 1997), Canadian ice hockey goaltender
- Daniel Ingram (born 1975), Canadian composer and songwriter in animation and television
- Dan Ingram (1934–2018), American radio disc jockey
- Dan Ingram (born 1982) Leading UK asbestos removal, remediation and demolition consultant
- David Ingram (disambiguation)
  - David Ingram (explorer), 16th-century English sailor and explorer
  - David S. Ingram (born 1941), British botanist
  - Dave Ingram (born 1969), British death metal vocalist
  - David Bronson Ingram, American businessman and philanthropist
  - David Bruce Ingram (born 1952), American philosopher
- Davina Ingrams, 18th Baroness Darcy de Knayth (1938–2008), British politician and member of the House of Lords
- E. Bronson Ingram II (1866–1954), American billionaire heir and business executive
- E. Snapper Ingram (1884–1966), served as a Los Angeles City Councilman
- Edward (Eddie) Ingram, (1910–1973), Irish cricketer
- Erskine B. Ingram (1866–1954), American businessman and philanthropist
- Frank Ingram (1907–1985), Canadian ice hockey-player
- Frederic B. Ingram, American businessman whose jail sentence for bribery was commuted by President Jimmy Carter, renounced his US citizenship.
- Sir Geoffrey Ingram Taylor (1886–1975), British physicist and mathematician
- George Ingram, 8th Viscount of Irvine, (1694–1763), English clergyman and peer
- George Morby Ingram (1889–1961), Australian recipient of the Victoria Cross
- Gordon Ingram (1924–2004), American firearm designer
- Harrison Ingram (born 2002), American basketball player
- Henry Ingram, 1st Viscount of Irvine, (1640–1666), British peer
- Henry Ingram, 7th Viscount of Irvine, (1691–1761), English landowner and politician
- Sir Herbert Ingram, (1811–1860), founder of The London Illustrated News and MP for Boston
- Cecil W. "Hootie" Ingram, (1933–2024), American football player, coach and athletics administrator
- Isabella Ingram-Seymour-Conway, Marchioness of Hertford (1759–1834), English landowner, courtier and mistress of King George IV
- Jack Ingram (disambiguation)
  - Jack Owen Ingram, (born 1970), country-western singer
  - Jack Ingram, (1902–1969), American actor, appeared in over 300 films between 1935 and 1966
  - Jack Ingram, (1936–2021), American former race car driver and champion
- Ja'Marcus Ingram (born 1997), American football player
- James Ingram (disambiguation)
  - James Ingram (1774–1850), English academic
  - James Ingram (born 1928), Australian company director, public servant and diplomat
  - James Ingram (1952–2019), American R&B singer, songwriter and producer
  - James Ingram Merrill (James Merrill) (1926–1995), Pulitzer Prize winning American poet
- Janaye Michelle Ingram, American beauty queen
- Jason Ingram, Christian music producer and songwriter
- Jay Ingram (born 1945), Canadian author and broadcaster
- Joan Ingram, Scottish journalist and broadcaster
- John Ingram (disambiguation)
  - John Ingram (engineer) (1924–2015), New Zealand engineer and businessman
  - John Ingram (engraver) (1721–1767 or later), English engraver
  - John Ingram (martyr) (1565–1594), English Jesuit and martyr
  - John Ingram (politician) (1929–2013), retired American Democratic politician, attorney, and insurance commissioner
  - John Ingram (revolutionary) (fl. 1644–1676), leader of Bacon's Rebellion after the death of Nathaniel Bacon
  - John 'Jack' Ingram (born 1957), professional ice hockey player
  - John Henry Ingram (1842–1916), English biographer and editor
  - John Kells Ingram (1823–1907), Irish poet and scholar
  - John Michael Ingram (1931–2014), British menswear designer and founder of Design Intelligence forecasting agency
  - John R. Ingram (businessman) (born 1961/1962), American heir, businessman and philanthropist, Director of the Ingram Micro, Inc.
  - John W. Ingram (1929–2008), Federal Railroad Administrator of the Chicago, Rock Island and Pacific Railway, 1971–1974
- Johnathan Ingram (born 1980), is a former American football offensive lineman
- Jonas H. Ingram, officer in the United States Navy during World War I and World War II
- Jonathan Ingram, BIM software developer
- Julius Ingram (1832–1917), American politician
- Lee Royston Ingram, (born 1965), former English cricketer
- Lorenzo Ingram, Jamaican cricketer
- Luther Ingram (1937–2007), American R&B and soul singer
- Keaontay Ingram (born 1999), American football player
- Keith Ingram, Arkansas politician
- Malcolm Ingram (born 1968), Canadian independent film director
- Marione Ingram (born 1935), German-born civil rights activist
- Mark Ingram Sr., former NFL wide receiver with the New York Giants
- Mark Ingram II, Heisman Trophy winner and current NFL running back currently with the Houston Texans
- Martha Rivers Ingram (born 1935), American billionaire
- Mary Ann Ingram, American electrical engineer
- Maurice Ingram (1890–1941), British diplomat
- Melissa Ingram (born 1985), New Zealand swimming competitor
- Nicholas Ingram (Nicholas Lee Ingram), executed in 1995 in Georgia by the electric chair
- Orrin Henry Ingram (1830–1918), American lumber baron and philanthropist
- Orrin H. Ingram II, American businessman and polo player
- Osmond Ingram (Osmond Kelly Ingram) (1887–1917), sailor in the US Navy during World War I who received the Medal of Honor posthumously
- Paul Ingram (nuclear disarmament expert), BASIC executive director
- Peter Ingram, (1869–1955), cricketer
- Peter John Ingram, (born 1978), cricketer from New Zealand
- Rae Ingram (born 1974), English football defender
- Reed Ingram, American politician
- Rex Ingram (actor), (1895–1969), American stage, film, and television actor
- Rex Ingram (director), (1892–1950), film director, producer, writer and actor
- Rich Ingram, 5th Viscount of Irvine, (1688–1721), English peer and politician
- Richard Ingrams (born 1937), British journalist, co-founder and second editor of the British satirical magazine Private Eye and editor of The Oldie magazine
- Robert R. Ingram (born 1945), recipient of the Medal of Honor
- Roger Ingram (born 1957), American musician, author, educator, and designer
- Reginald William Thomas "Roy" Ingram, South African boxer who competed in the 1920 and 1924 Summer Olympics
- Sam Ingram (born 1985), British paralympic judoka
- Sheila Ingram (1957–2020), American sprinter
- Takiora Ingram, academic and policy advisor on marine conservation from the Cook Islands
- Sir Thomas Ingram (1614–1672), English Royalist politician
- Tricia Ingrams (1946–1996), British journalist and interviewer
- Vernon Ingram (1924–2006), professor of biology at the MIT who discovered the biochemical cause of sickle cell disease
- William Ingram (disambiguation)
  - William Ayerst Ingram (1855−1913), Scottish landscape and marine painter
  - William Austin Ingram (1924–2002), former United States federal judge from California
  - William Ingram (writer) (1930–2013), writer
  - Sir William Ingram, 1st Baronet (1847–1924), managing director of The London Illustrated News and MP for Boston
  - William E. Ingram Jr. (born 1948), United States Army Lieutenant General and Director of the Army National Guard
  - William T. Ingram (1913–2001), first President of Memphis Theological Seminary
  - William Ingram (priest) (1834–1901), priest and Dean of Peterborough
  - William Ayerst Ingram (1855–1913), British painter and member of the Newlyn School
  - Bill Ingram, (1898–1943), American college football coach
  - Billy Ingram, English Footballer in 1890 FA Cup Final
  - W. K. Ingram, Arkansas politician
  - William Alfred Ingram (1876–1944), British tennis player
  - William Ingram (literature professor), (born 1930), American Professor of Literature
- Wally Ingram, American drummer and musician

== Fictional characters ==
- Blanche Ingram, a character in Charlotte Brontë's novel Jane Eyre
- Carl Ingram, one of Agent 47's targets in Dubai in Hitman 3
- Todd Ingram, Ramona's third evil ex in the Scott Pilgrim series

== See also ==
- Viscount of Irvine (or Irwin) and Lord Ingram, Scottish Peerages created 1661 for the Ingram family
- Ingram Baronets of Swineshead Abbey, British Baronetcy created 1893
- Ingraham (disambiguation), includes a list of people with surname Ingraham
- Engram (disambiguation), includes list of people with surname Engram
- Ingram, Northumberland
