= William Ingram =

William Ingram may refer to:

- Bill Ingram (1898–1943), American college football coach
- Billy Ingram (born 1865), English footballer
- W. K. Ingram (died 1981), Arkansas politician
- William Ingram (priest) (1834–1901), Anglican priest and dean of Peterborough
- Sir William Ingram, 1st Baronet (1847–1924), British publisher and MP
- William Ayerst Ingram (1855–1913), British painter and member of the Newlyn School
- William Alfred Ingram (1876–1944), British tennis player
- William T. Ingram (1913–2001), American theologian and president of Memphis Theological Seminary
- William Austin Ingram (1924–2002), former United States federal judge from California
- William Ingram (literature professor) (born 1930)
- William Ingram (writer) (1930-2013), Welsh writer and actor
- William E. Ingram Jr. (born 1948), United States Army Lieutenant General and Director of the Army National Guard
