= Battle of San Juan de Ulúa =

The Battle of San Juan de Ulúa may refer to:

- Battle of San Juan de Ulúa (1568)
- Battle of San Juan de Ulúa (1838)
