= David Ingram =

David or Dave Ingram may refer to:

- David Ingram (explorer), 16th-century English sailor
- David Ingram (linguist) (born 1944), American linguist
- David S. Ingram (born 1941), British botanist
- Dave Ingram (born 1969), British death metal vocalist
- David Bronson Ingram, American businessman and philanthropist
- David Bruce Ingram (born 1952), American philosopher
- David Ancrum, known in Greece as David Ingram, due to a transliteration error (born 1958), American former college and professional basketball player and coach
