= Joan Ingram =

Joan Ingram may refer to:

- Joan Ingram (broadcaster), Scottish broadcaster
- Joan Ingram (tennis) (1910–1981), English tennis and table tennis player
- Joan Ingram (actress) (1903–1974), British actress
