= Battle of San Juan de Ulúa (1568) =

Battle of the Anglo-Spanish War

- Part of the second Anglo-Spanish trade war (1568–1573)
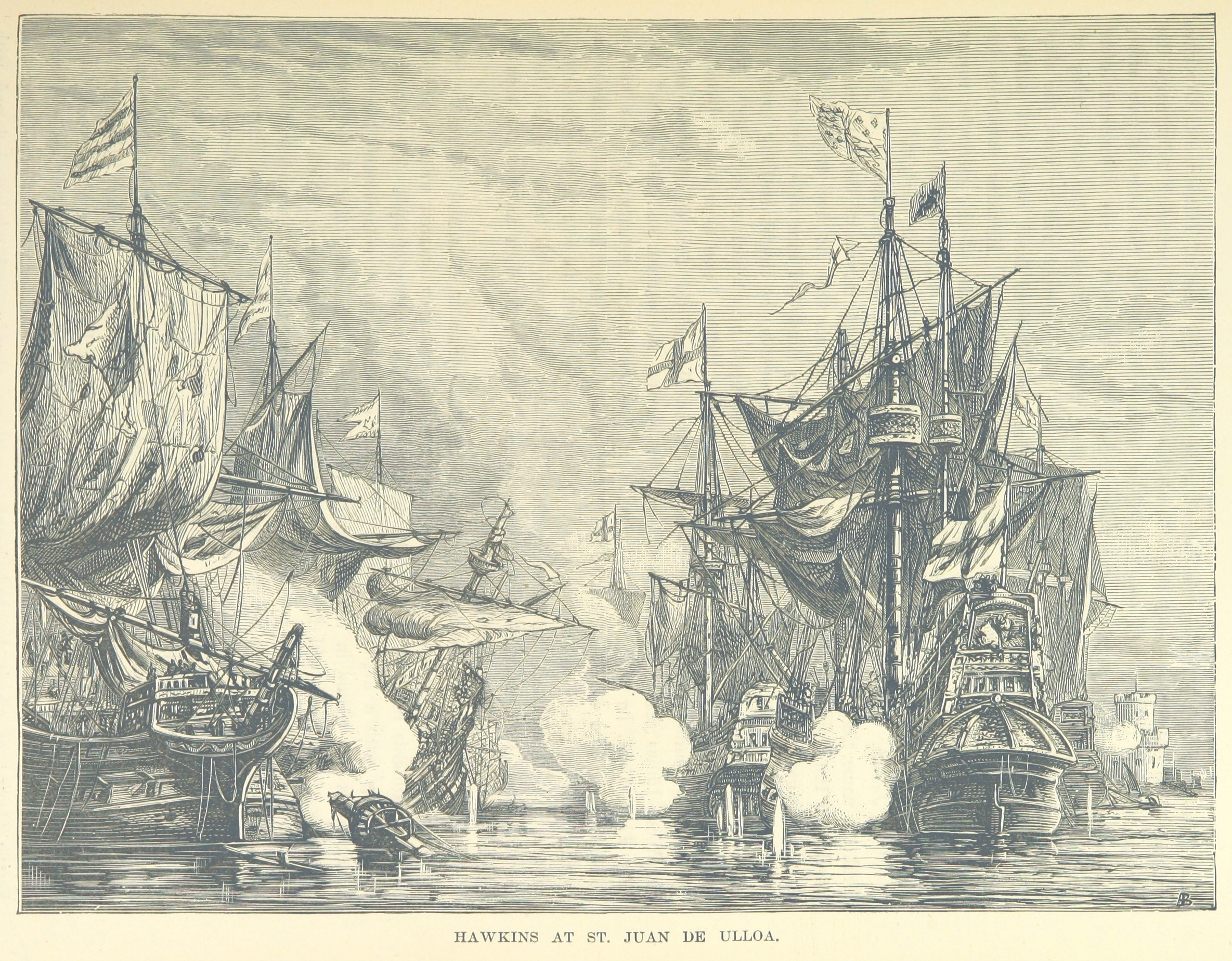
- An 1887 illustration of the battle
Date	24 September 1568
Location	San Juan de Ulúa, New Spain (present-day Veracruz, Mexico) 19°12′27″N 96°7′57″W
Result	Spanish victory

Belligerents
Spain: New Spain	Kingdom of England

Commanders and leaders
Francisco Luján; Juan de Ubilla	John Hawkins; Francis Drake

Strength
13 ships	6 ships 400 crew

Casualties and losses
1 ship 20 killed	4 ships 320 killed

The Battle of San Juan de Ulúa was fought between English privateers and Spanish forces at San Juan de Ulúa (in modern Veracruz, Mexico). The English flotilla of six armed merchant ships under John Hawkins had been trading along the Spanish Main with the cooperation of local Spanish officials. However, the central Spanish authorities considered this to be illegal smuggling that violated the Treaty of Tordesillas (which England did not recognise).

Hawkins' fleet anchored at San Juan de Ulúa to resupply and repair following a storm. They were found there by two Spanish galleons carrying Martín Enríquez de Almanza, the newly appointed viceroy of New Spain. The two commanders agreed a truce that would allow both fleets to use the anchorage. The Spanish never intended to follow its terms and secretly prepared to attack the English ships. When the English became suspicious of the preparations, Spanish forces began their attack by capturing English cannons on the shore and attempted to board the English ships. The boarding parties were initially repulsed, but the shore cannons were turned against the English ships, causing heavy damage.

Two English vessels escaped, and the other four were either sunk or captured. The Spanish lost one ship. The English considered the battle an example of Spanish treachery, and the Spanish considered it a necessary response to criminal activity. Resentment engendered by the battle was considered a cause of the Anglo-Spanish War which broke out 17 years later.

== Background ==
After the beginning of the Age of Discovery and the European exploration of the New World, the two major naval powers of the time, Spain and Portugal, agreed to split the new territories between them. In 1494, the two nations' monarchs and Pope Alexander VI signed the Treaty of Tordesillas, dividing the New World into Spanish and Portuguese zones. As a result, the Spanish crown considered everything west of the Tordesillas meridian its property, including the entire North American continent.

Following the Protestant Reformation in the early 16th century, Protestant nations did not recognize Papal spiritual or temporal authority, and so ignored the treaty. English merchants and adventurers engaged in trade with New Spain and founded their own colonies. Spain was deeply suspicious of any attempt by foreign powers to trade or establish colonies in the region they considered their zone of control. In 1565, Spain destroyed Fort Caroline in French Florida and massacred its several hundred Huguenot inhabitants after they surrendered.

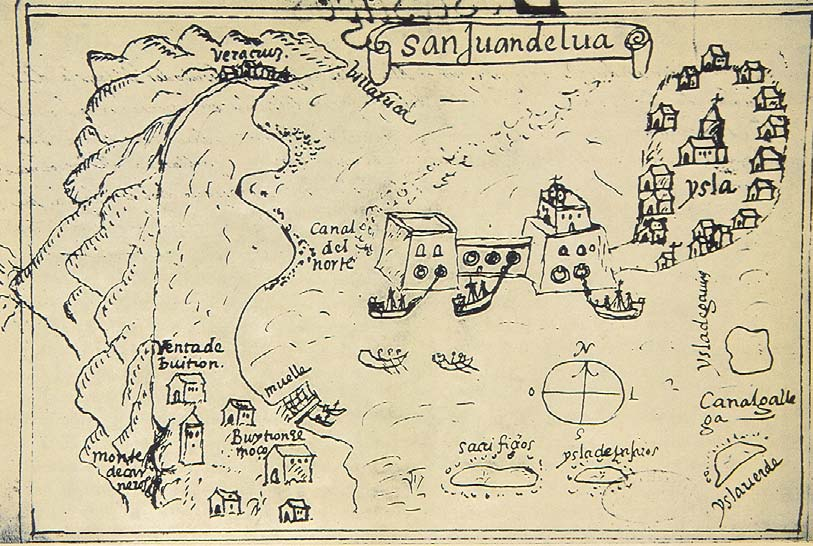
A 16th century map of the island; the mooring wall where the Spanish and English ships docked is at center. It is unclear if there were buildings on the island at the time of the battle.

John Hawkins, an English adventurer to the New World, engaged in trading voyages to Spanish colonies in the Americas in 1562–63 and in 1564–65, with tacit approval from the English Crown. On both occasions Hawkins had traded slaves for gold, silver, pearls, hides, and sugar with several Spanish colonial settlements, with varying degrees of success. Although this trade was illegal according to Spanish law, local colonial governors and magistrates were willing to trade with Hawkins provided he either proffered them bribes or sold his merchandise at a discount. On each occasion Hawkins received written testimonials from Spanish colonial officials confirming his good behaviour, and his voyages were profitable. During his second voyage, while stopping at Rio de la Hacha to sell slaves, wine, flour, biscuit, and linens, he accepted orders from Spanish clients for his next journey and obtained a letter from the local Spanish treasurer attesting to his fair dealings. Nevertheless, higher Spanish authorities were alarmed by this challenge to their monopoly, and the court of justice in Santo Domingo ordered any English ships in the region to be seized along with their cargoes.

Hawkins' third expedition to the region consisted of five ships: the Royal carracks Jesus of Lübeck (leased from Queen Elizabeth I) captained by Hawkins himself, the Minion under John Hampton, and three barques, the Judith under Hawkins' cousin Francis Drake, Angel, and Swallow. They travelled to Ghana to acquire slaves, where they competed with Portuguese slave traders. A captured Portuguese caravel was added to the flotilla and renamed Grace of God. A seventh ship, the barque William and John, had been part of Hawkins' expedition but sailed home before the battle; she reached Ireland in February 1569 but was then lost with all hands before arriving in England. The remaining fleet took on water and 400–500 slaves in Guinea in early February 1568 and reached Santo Domingo on 27 March. Hawkins began selling his cargoes to Spanish colonists for gold, silver, and jewels, as on his previous voyages, departing from Cartagena on 23 July.

After attempting to reach the coast of Florida in August, the fleet met a powerful storm that warped the Jesus of Lübeck's hull planking and damaged her rudder. Short on supplies, unable to reach Florida and unwilling to risk a transatlantic voyage in a damaged state, Hawkins changed course on 16 September to head for the nearest available port, San Juan de Ulua (the port of Veracruz at that time). While travelling to San Juan, Hawkins overtook three Spanish vessels carrying 100 passengers. Concerned about being intercepted by Spanish authorities, Hawkins hoped that with these he might be able to negotiate better terms to refit and resupply. Spanish officials originally mistook his fleet for an expected Spanish one and went aboard, then were dismayed to discover that they were on an English ship. Hawkins informed them that he did not seek plunder or pillage but instead desired only supplies and to repair his ship, which relieved the Spanish officials. The next day while the English ships were reprovisioning, two Spanish galleons under command of Don Francisco Luján arrived at the port, carrying Don Martin Enriquez de Almanza, the new viceroy of New Spain, to his post in Mexico City.

== Battle ==
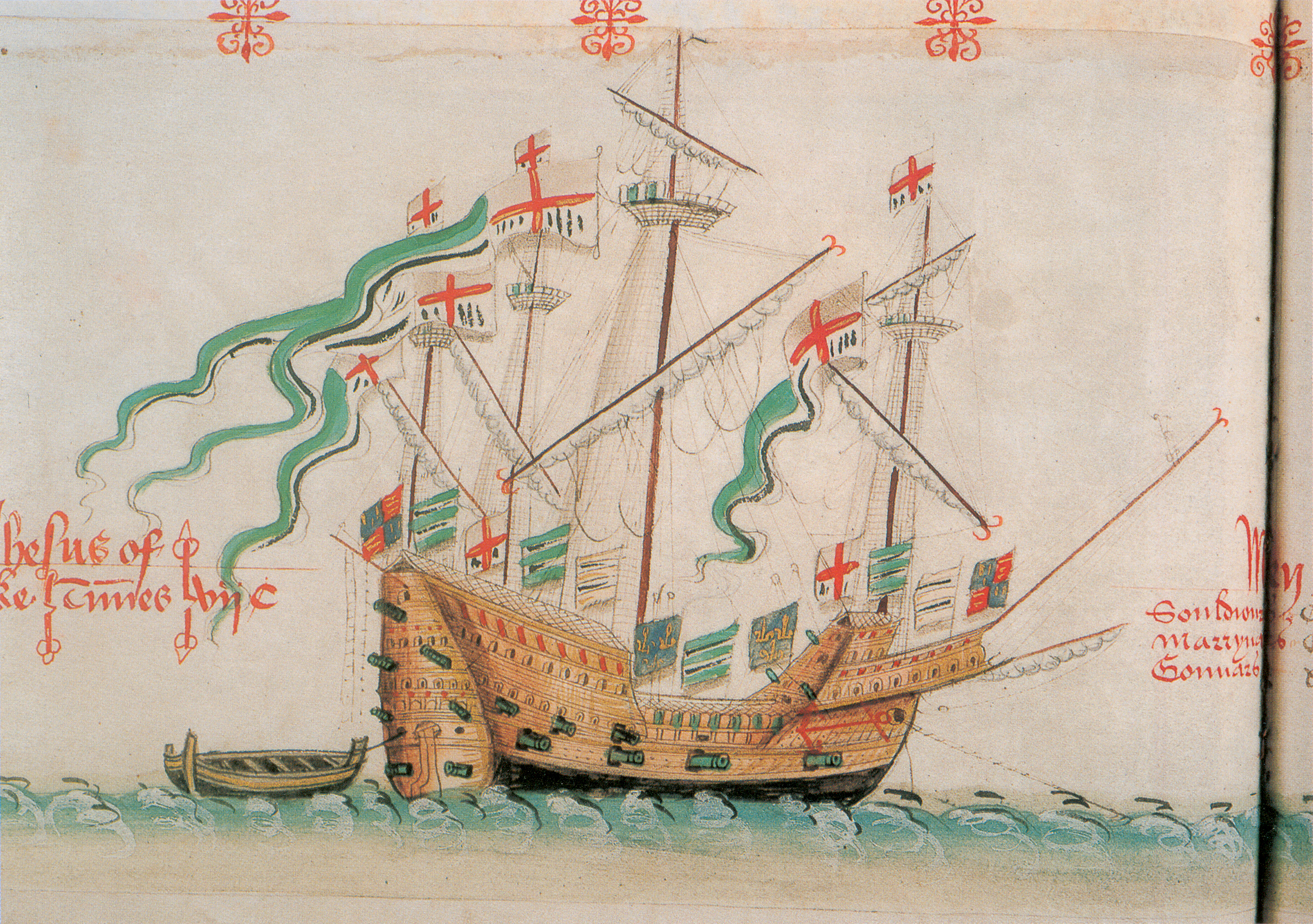
The English carrack Jesus of Lübeck, captured by the Spanish during the battle, as depicted in the Anthony Roll

San Juan's port facilities were extremely small and rudimentary, consisting of a mooring wall built by the Spanish on "a little yland of stones, not past three feet aboue water in the highest place, and not past a bow-shotte ouer any way at the most, and it standeth from the maine land, two bowshootes or more". As it would be difficult to accommodate both fleets in the anchorage, Hawkins sent a message to the Spanish fleet asking for an agreement on how the two fleets should treat each other, in order to avoid confrontation.

English privateers had repeatedly ignored the Treaty of Tordesillas by attacking merchant shipping but Hawkins expected the Spanish would respect a truce if one was agreed. After two days of negotiation, both sides agreed to terms and exchanged a dozen hostages. The Spanish fleet then entered the mooring and spent two further days anchoring. The ships of each country were separated and anchored apart from each other. Under the terms of the agreement the English were permitted by the Spanish to buy supplies for money, repair their ships, and occupy the island with 11 pieces of ordnance. The Spanish also agreed not to carry any arms onto the island. However, unbeknownst to Hawkins the Spanish fleet commander had been specifically charged with stopping English trade in New Spain and did not intend to honour the truce. The Spanish began secretly massing an attack force on the mainland near the harbour, with the goal of seizing the shore batteries which were defending the English ships at anchor. In addition, the Spanish hid another force of 150 men on board a hulk, the San Salvador, which was to be brought up between the English and Spanish ships.

The Spanish plan was to place the hulk between the Spanish and English fleets at midday on 24 September; once in position, a trumpet would sound, signalling the attack, ideally while the English were taking their lunch. However the English became suspicious after spotting Spanish crews shifting weapons between ships. Hawkins sent the captain of the Jesus of Lübeck, Robert Barret (who spoke fluent Spanish) to demand that the viceroy, Don Martin de Enriquez, disembark his men from the hulk and cease their threatening activities. Realizing that the plot had been detected, the viceroy ordered Barrett to be seized, the trumpet to sound and the Spanish to launch their attack immediately. The Spanish troops concealed on the mainland quickly rowed a pinnace to the island, under the command of Captain Delgadillo, They overwhelmed the English sailors who had been manning the cannons on the beach, with many of the sailors fleeing to the safety of their ships. No quarter was given. This action would be decisive for the outcome of the battle.

The Minion, the ship closest to the Spanish hulk, was the immediate target of the Spanish boarding action but was able to defend itself against the attack and hauled away. The next ship, Jesus of Lübeck, was boarded by the Spaniards from the hulk but after a violent struggle the Spaniards were repulsed; the Jesus of Lübeck was able to cut away and join the Minion. The French commander of the Grace of God, Robert Blondel, set her on fire to prevent capture before joining Hawkins on board the Jesus of Lübeck. The English opened fire on the Spanish, causing the vice-admiral's ship, the galleon Santa Clara, to catch fire and sink inside the port. The flagship San Pedro, the only fully-armed Spanish ship present, was also badly hit during an exchange of fire with Minion.

By this point the shore batteries were entirely in the possession of the Spaniards, who turned the cannons against the English ships. Jesus of Lübeck was heavily damaged and dismasted. The English manoeuvred the Jesus of Lübeck so that it stood between the Minion and the shore batteries, thus acting as a shield until the Minion could be moored out of range of the Spanish batteries on the shore. Angel sank after a few salvoes, and Swallow was seized by the Spanish soldiers manning the batteries. The crews of both ships, along with some members of the crew of the battered Jesus of Lübeck, were later rescued by a pinnace after Hawkins gave the order to abandon ship. Hawkins then took command of the Minion.

Only the Judith, commanded by Drake, and Minion escaped, leaving behind the Jesus of Lubeck with some members of her crew still on board. The surviving vessels sailed out of the anchorage when two fire ships were sent against them by the Spanish, but took no damage. During the night Francis Drake, commanding the 50-ton Judith, abandoned the fleet and sailed for home, leaving Hawkins alone on board the overcrowded and poorly provisioned 100-ton Minion. During the night the wind shifted and, according to the royal lieutenant-governor in Vera Cruz Francisco de Bustamente, this prevented the Spanish from following the English. The drifting Jesus of Lübeck, with some of her remaining crew, was eventually seized in a second attack by the men of the hulk San Salvador, under the command of Captain Francisco de Luján. Ubilla allowed his men to loot the booty left on the Jesus of Lübeck, while Delgadillo acquired the English flagship, sold at auction on the island.

== Abandoned crewmen ==
During their withdrawal, the Minion and the Judith were hopelessly overcrowded and short of food and water; 114 crew were abandoned (forced and voluntary) on the Mexican coast. Most headed south and were attacked by Chichimecs, imprisoned by Spaniards in Tampico, and then transferred to Mexico City. Upon eventual release from prison, they lived freely until the Inquisition.

Initially they were treated well by the Spanish, some were released and settled down to farming and started families. However, three years later, in 1571, the Inquisition arrived in Mexico, including the merciless Moya de Contreras and Fernandez de Bonilla. The released crewmen were rounded up and imprisoned. The captives were brought before the Inquisition; the eleven who had been juveniles (under 16 at the time of the battle) were deemed to have been too young to have received any Catholic catechism, and so were treated relatively leniently – for example, Miles Philips, born in 1554, was sentenced to three years in a Jesuit house in Mexico.

The rest were regarded as heretical lapsed Catholics, and in February 1574, after being tortured to obtain confessions, sentences were handed down, including:

- William Collins, of Oxford, age forty, seaman, ten years in the galleys;
- John Burton, of Bar Abbey, twenty-two, seaman, 200 lashes and six years in the galleys;
- John Williams, twenty-eight, of Cornwall, 200 lashes and eight years in the galleys;
- George Dee, thirty, seaman, 300 lashes and eight years in the galleys.

The following year John Martin of Cork, also known as Cornelius the Irishman, was burned at the stake; and some others were sentenced to penal servitude in the galleys for life.

A smaller group of sailors decided to head north and attempt to reach a French fort on the east coast of the mainland. After a journey of 12 months and over 5,000 km (3,000 mi), three sailors, David Ingram, Richard Twide, and Richard Browne arrived at Cape Breton where they were picked up by a French ship and returned eventually to England. in 1582, Ingram was interviewed about his travels, and an edited version thereof appeared in Richard Hakluyt's 1589 book, The Principal Navigations...

== Aftermath ==
Hawkins eventually arrived back in England with a crew of only 15. Drake had reached Plymouth one month earlier, in December. Only 70 or 80 sailors from the original expedition returned to England at all.

Hawkins accused the Spaniards of treachery for not honouring the truce. Don Enrique justified his actions as upholding his authority and the Spanish monopoly in the West Indies.

In the following decades, the battle of San Juan de Ulua was remembered by Englishmen as an egregious example of Spanish treachery. Drake's desertion with the Judith in the heat of the action, leaving his relative and patron to fend for himself, would haunt Drake for years to come and helped harden his attitudes towards Catholics in general and Spaniards in particular.

The battle was a precursor to the war that broke out 17 years later between Philip II of Spain and Elizabeth I of England in 1585.
