= John Ingram =

John Ingram may refer to:

- John Ingram (engineer) (1924–2015), New Zealand engineer and businessman
- John Ingram (engraver) (1721–1767 or later), English engraver
- John Ingram (martyr) (1565–1594), English Jesuit and martyr
- John Ingram (politician) (1929–2013), retired American Democratic politician, attorney, and insurance commissioner
- John Ingram (revolutionary) (b. before 1644), leader of Bacon's Rebellion after the death of Nathaniel Bacon
- Jack Ingram (ice hockey) (John Jasper Ingram, born 1957), professional ice hockey player
- John Henry Ingram (1842–1916), English biographer and editor
- John Kells Ingram (1823–1907), Irish poet and scholar
- John Michael Ingram (1931–2014), British menswear designer and founder of Design Intelligence forecasting agency.
- John R. Ingram (businessman) (born 1961/1962), American heir, businessman and philanthropist.
- John W. Ingram (1929–2008), Federal Railroad Administrator of the Chicago, Rock Island and Pacific Railway, 1971–1974

== See also ==
- Jack Ingram (disambiguation)
