= Alfred East =

English painter (1844–1913)

Sir Alfred East RA, RBA
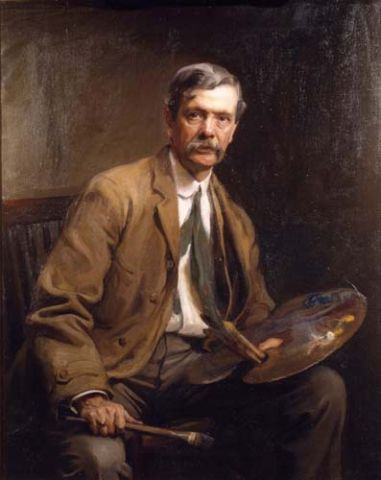
- Portrait of East (1907) by Philip de László
- Born: 15 December 1844; Kettering, Northamptonshire, England
- Died: 28 September 1913 (aged 68); London, England
- Education: Glasgow School of Art
- Elected: President of the Royal Society of British Artists, Associate of the Royal Society

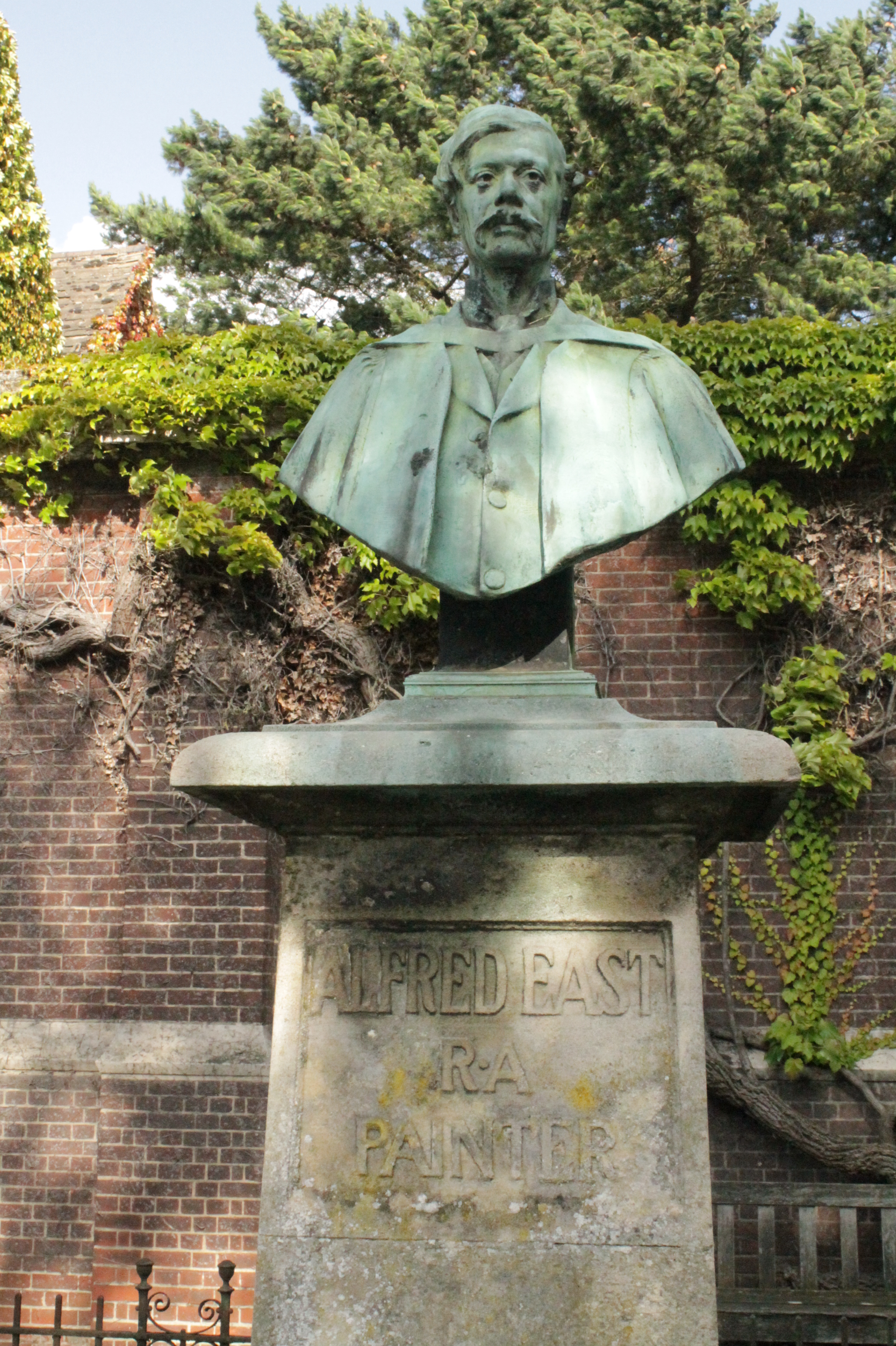
Memorial to Alfred East in Kettering

Sir Alfred Edward East (15 December 1844 – 28 September 1913) was an English painter.

== Life ==
East was born in Kettering in Northamptonshire and studied at the Glasgow School of Art. His romantic landscapes show the influence of the Barbizon school. His The Art of Landscape Painting in Oil Colour was published in 1906. In April 1888 he had shared an exhibition at the galleries of the Fine Art Society with T. C. Gotch and W. Ayerst Ingram, and was commissioned the following year by Marcus Huish, managing director of the Society, to spend six months in Japan to paint the landscape and the people of the country. When the exhibition of 104 paintings from this tour was held at the Fine Art Society in 1890 it was a spectacular success.

East visited Spain after 1892 when he visited Algeciras at the southern end of Iberia.

In 1906 he was elected president of the Royal Society of British Artists, a position he held until his death. In that year, he published his 107-page illustrated The Art of Landscape Painting in Oil Colour; in its preface, he made the observation: "The greatest errors in landscape painting are to be found – contradictory as it may appear – not so much in the matter of technique as in the painter's attitude toward Nature". In this book he described his techniques using colours, half-tones and pencil sketches.

He was awarded a knighthood in 1910 by King Edward VII. His portrait was painted by Philip de László. The Alfred East Art Gallery in Kettering, designed by John Alfred Gotch opened on 31 July 1913. The Alfred East Gallery is Northamptonshire's oldest purpose-built art gallery.

East was elected an Associate of the Royal Academy in 1899, having been a regular exhibitor since 1883 and elected to full membership in 1913.

On 28 September 1913, Alfred East died at his London residence in Belsize Park. His body was taken back to Kettering and lay in state in the Art Gallery, where it was surrounded by the pictures he had presented to the town, and attracted crowds of several thousands.

== Gallery ==
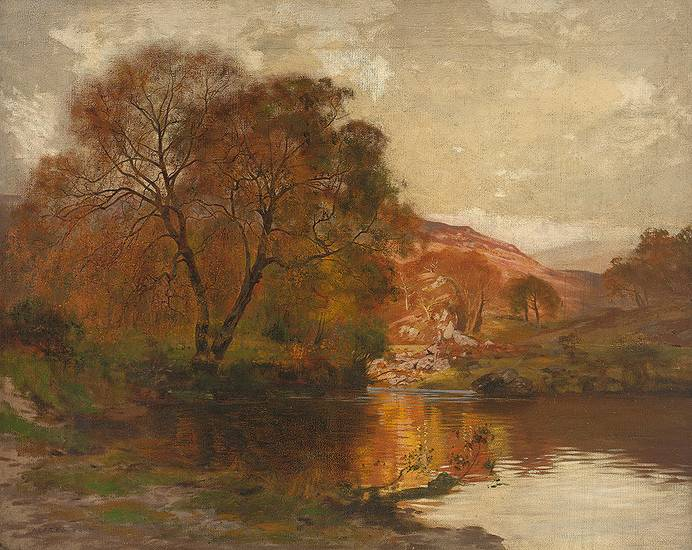
Lake in Autumn

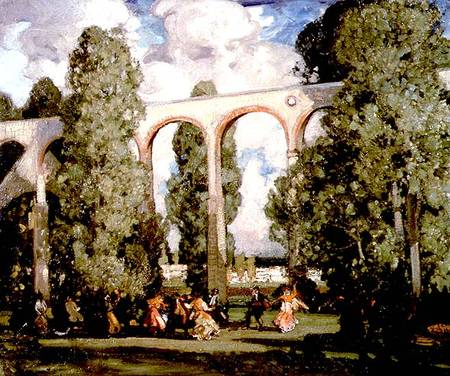
The Fiesta

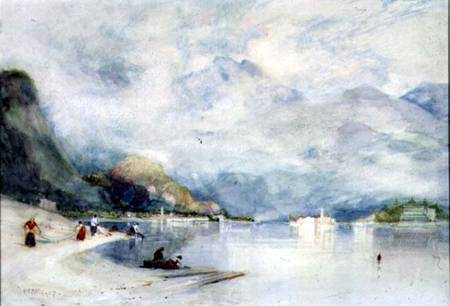
Lake Maggiore from Stresa

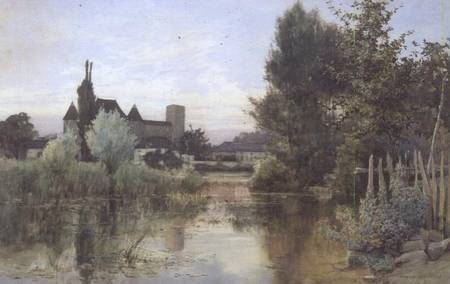
Château de Nemours

View at Kettering

The Valley of the Lambourne, 1902

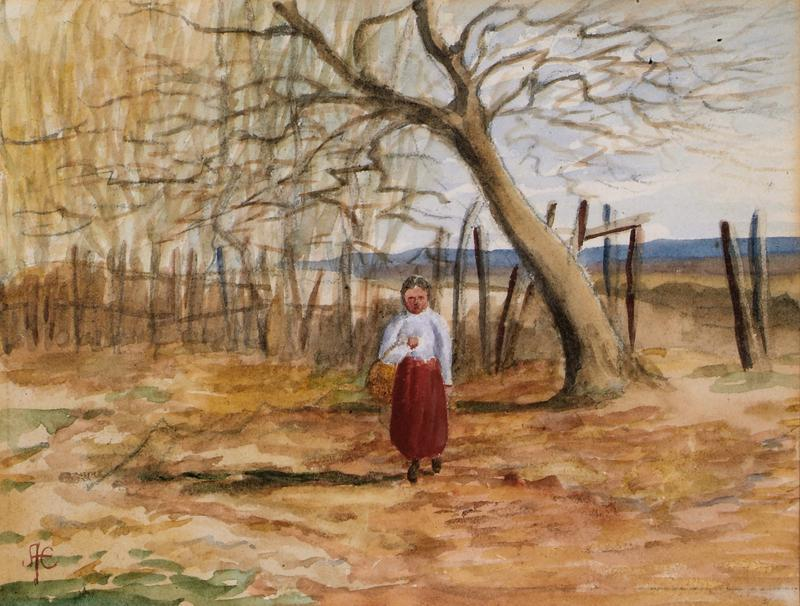
Landscape with a Child

== Bibliography ==
- Peyton Skipwith, 'An Enlightened Artist in Japan', Country Life 5 January 1984
- Sir Hugh Cortazzi, A British Artist in Meiji Japan, Print Pub, 1991
- 1991—East, Sir Alfred. A British Artist in Meiji Japan (ed., Hugh Cortazzi) - reprinted by Weatherhill, Boston, 1997. ISBN 978-1-873047-05-7 (cloth)
- Peyton Skipwith, 'The Monet of the Cotswolds', Country Life, 2 October 2013.
- John Ramm, 'From Barbizon With Love', Antique Dealer & Collectors Guide, August 1994, Vol 48, No.1
- Paul Johnson and Kenneth McConkey, Alfred East: lyrical landscape painter, Bristol: Sansom & Company, 2009. ISBN 978-1-906593-33-9.
- Alfred East, 'The Art of Landscape Painting in Oil Colour', Cassell & Company, 1906. Also see online 1907 reprint and modern reprint ISBN 978-1176203532.
