= Auchmuty High School =

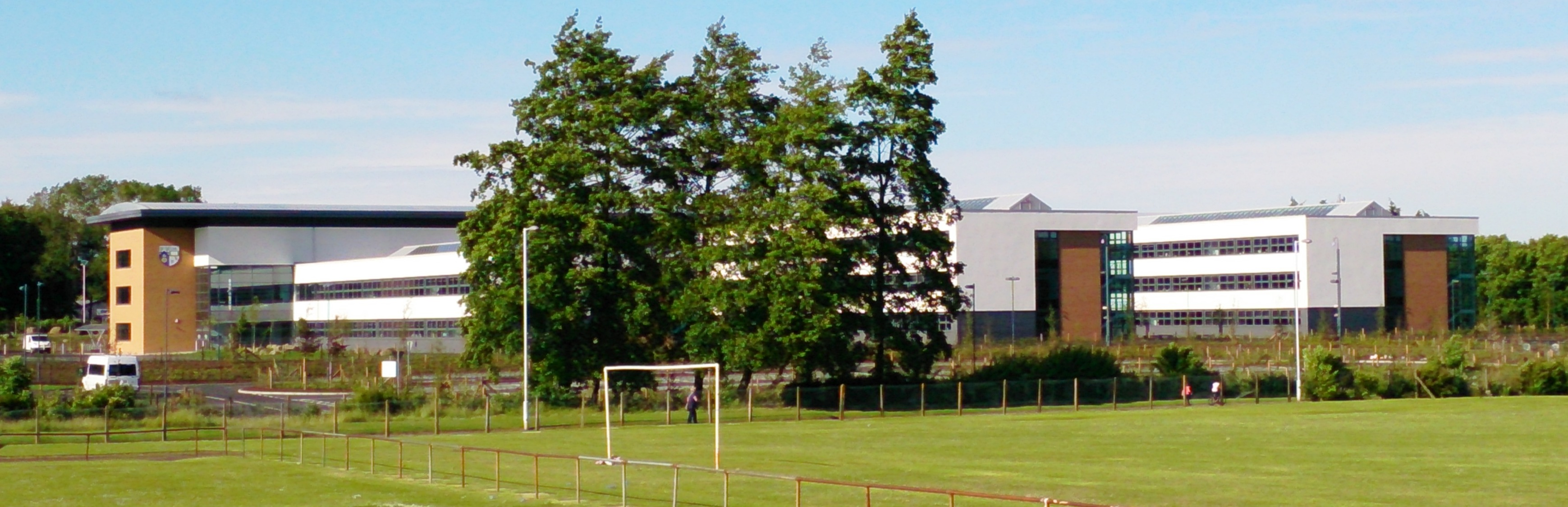
- The new building of Auchmuty High School completed summer 2013

Location
- Dovecot Road; Glenrothes, Fife, KY7 5JL; Scotland; 56.196°N 3.158°W

Information
- Type: Secondary
- Motto: Achieving High Standards
- Established: 1957
- Local authority: Fife Council
- Head teacher: Pam Davie
- Staff: 88 teaching (approx.)
- Enrolment: 1,350 (approx.)
- Colours: Navy, white, turquoise
- SEED Number: 5406439
- Website: www.auchmuty.org.uk

Auchmuty School is a state secondary school in the town of Glenrothes in the Fife council area of Scotland. Opened in 1957, it was the first school for secondary education in the area. It quickly outgrew the original building and additions were added in about 1970. The planning and construction of a completely new Auchmuty High School, beside the old one, began in 2011, with doors opening to pupils in 2013.

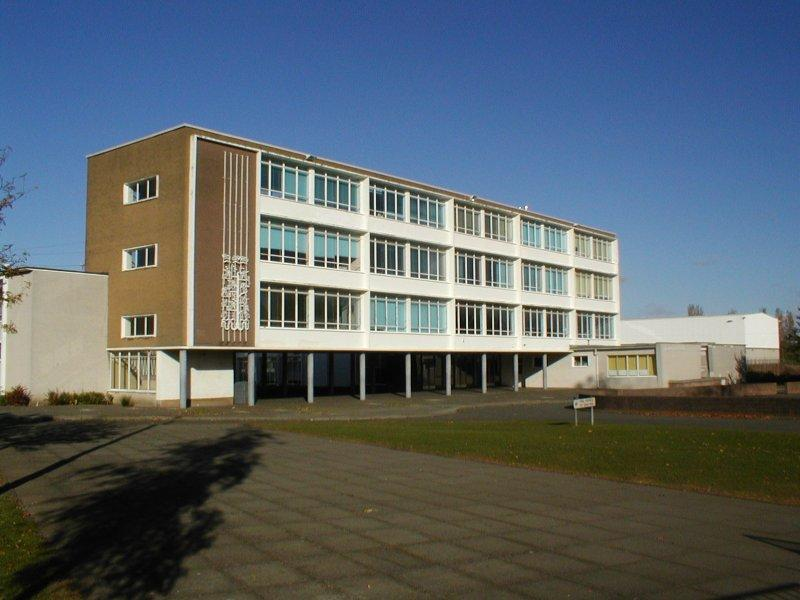
Auchmuty High School showing the 1957 building

With the old buildings remaining in use until the new ones were completed, the construction began on the playing fields beside the A92 and Queensway roundabout. After completion, the old buildings were gradually demolished and new playing fields were put in place, finishing in 2014. Auchmuty's sporting facilities now include 4 floodlit tennis courts, a multipurpose cage including outdoor basketball hoops, 3 full size grass pitches and an Astro turf floodlit football pitch which is used for a wide range of sports. Indoor sporting facilities include 2 small gymnasiums, a multi gym and a full size games hall with electronic scoreboard. The current role is around 1350 which is slightly higher than the recommended capacity for Auchmuty - a new school to replace the other two high schools in Glenrothes is currently being discussed.

Destination of school leavers 2009/10
	Auchmuty High School	Fife average	Scotland average
Total pupils	1,241	-	-
Leavers in 2009/10	256	-	-
Higher Education	29%	33%	36%
Further Education	43%	37%	27%
Training	4%	4%	5%
Employed	7%	12%	19%
Unemployed	17%	13%	12%

== Destinations of school leavers ==
Destination of school leavers 2009/10
	Auchmuty High School	Fife average	Scotland average
Total pupils	1,241	-	-
Leavers in 2009/10	256	-	-
Higher Education	29%	33%	36%
Further Education	43%	37%	27%
Training	4%	4%	5%
Employed	7%	12%	19%
Unemployed	17%	13%	12%

== Notable alumni ==
- Joan Ingram – broadcaster
- Dougray Scott – actor
- Mark Hirst – editor-in-chief
- Kevin McHattie – professional footballer

== Head teachers ==
Name	Began	Ended
David Thomson	1957	
Jim Cormie		
Donald Robertson		
John Alford		1977
Graham Garvie	1977	1990
Alex Kelly	1990	2005
David Wilson	2006	2009
Alan Pithie	2010	2021
Pam Davie	2021	Present

David Wilson resigned in February 2009, after being arrested in December 2008 on charges of possession of child pornography. He pleaded guilty to the charges in October 2009. There is no evidence that any pupils from the school were involved.
