= Jack Ingram (disambiguation) =

Jack Ingram (born 1970) is an American country musician.

Jack Ingram may also refer to:

- Jack Ingram (album), the debut album by country music artist Jack Ingram
- Jack Ingram (racing driver) (1936–2021), NASCAR driver
- Jack Ingram (actor) (1902–1969), American film actor
- Jack Ingram (ice hockey) (1893–1957), ice hockey player

== See also ==
- John Ingram (disambiguation)
