= The Game of Chinese Chess =

Drawing by François Boucher

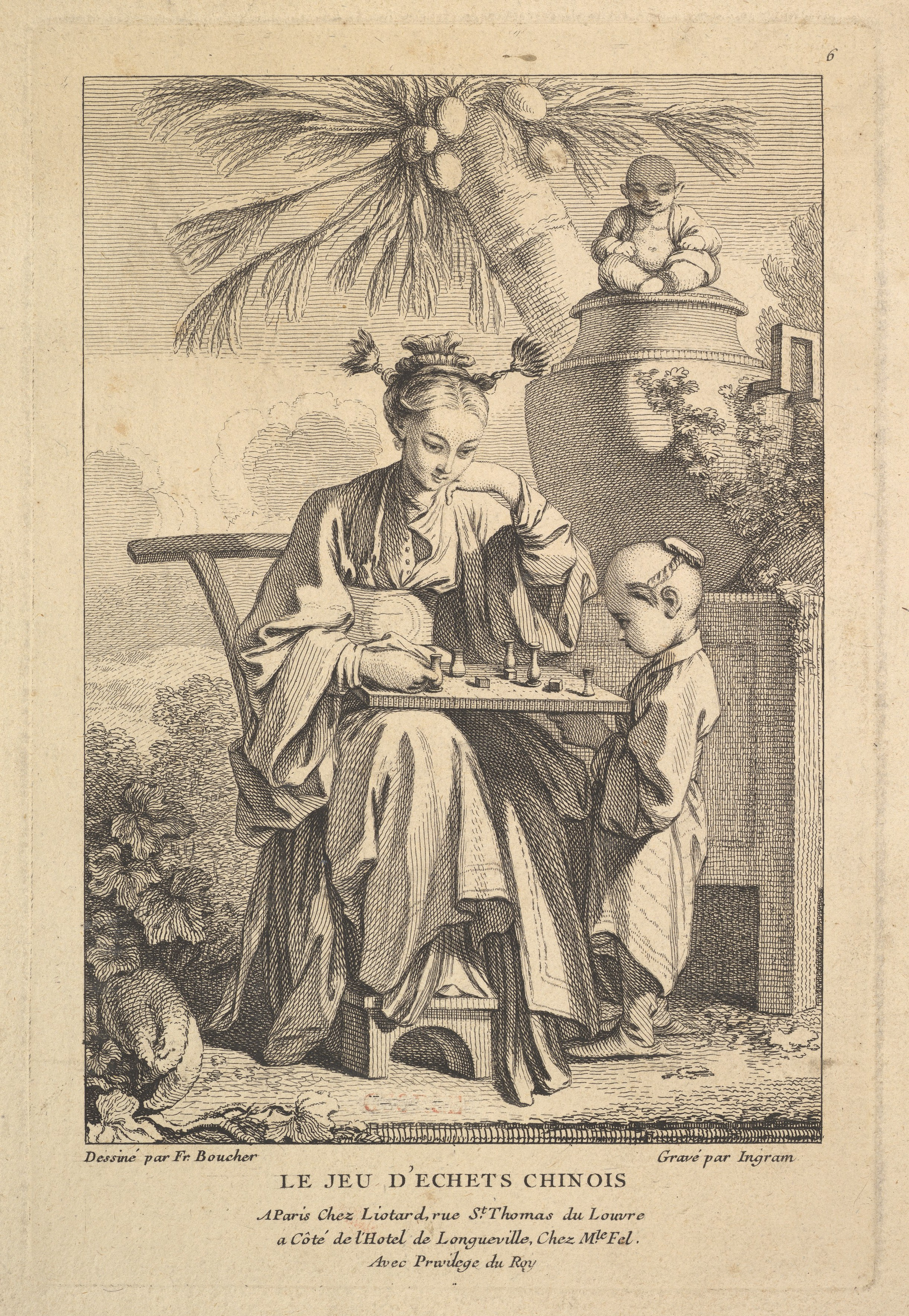
The Game of Chinese Chess, engraving

The Game of Chinese Chess or The Game of Chinese Checkers (French: Le jeu d'échets chinois) is a drawing by the French artist François Boucher, showing an orientalised image of two people playing Xiangqi. Although actual Xiangqi pieces are all round, the shapes of the pieces in the drawing are more varied.

The drawing is best known through the 39.4 by 27.7 cm engraving made after it by the Englishman John Ingram (1721 – c.1771; fl. 1763). It was part of a series of etchings he made of Boucher's chinoiserie subjects between 1741 and 1763 – he had moved from London to Paris and probably made 'Le Berger Content' or 'The Happy Shepherd' there in 1741 as the first work in the series. He then remained in Paris until his death and produced book illustrations as well as other works after Boucher. There is no evidence about his life after 1763 and so this is taken to be the latest possible date for the production of his engraving of Game.

One impression is now in the Metropolitan Museum of Art as Inventory number 66.628.4, part of the Elisha Whittelsey Collection. Another version of the engraving with a shorter central inscription is also in the Metropolitan Museum.

== Sources ==
- http://memory.loc.gov/diglib/ihas/loc.natlib.ihas.200182885/default.html
