= Jesus of Lübeck =

16th century Lübecker and English warship and transatlantic slave ship

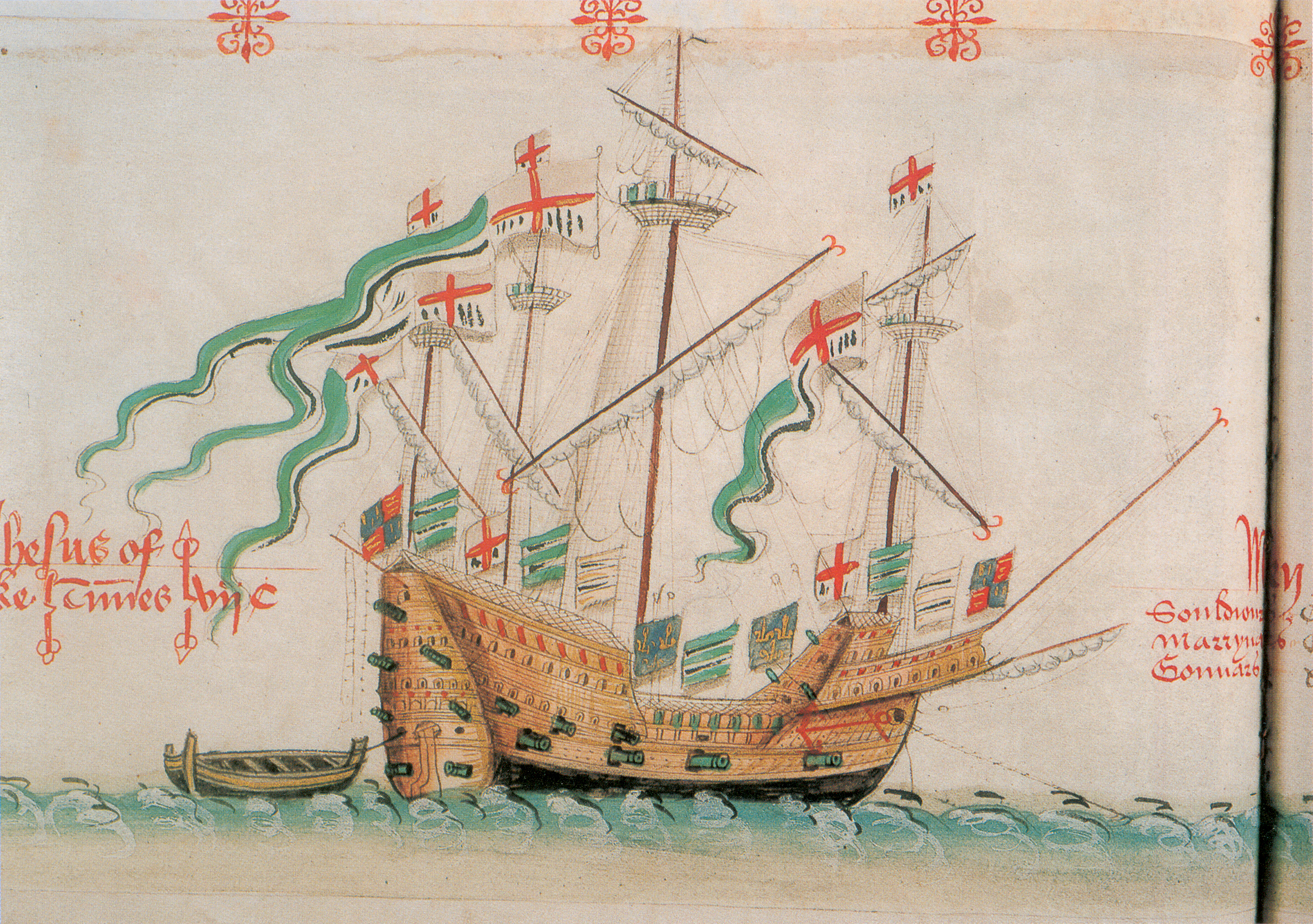
- Jesus of Lübeck on the Anthony Roll

History

Free City of Lübeck
- Name: Jesus von Lübeck
- Launched: c. 1520

History

England
- Name: The Jhesus of Lubeke
- Acquired: c. 1540
- Fate: Captured off San Juan de Ulúa, 23 September 1568

General characteristics
- Class & type: Carrack
- Tons burthen: ~700 tons

Jesus of Lübeck was a carrack built in the Free City of Lübeck in the early 16th century.

== English fleet ==
Around 1540 the ship, which had mostly been used for representative purposes, was acquired by Henry VIII, King of England, to augment his fleet.

The ship saw action during the French invasion of the Isle of Wight in 1545. She, along with Samson, was used in an unsuccessful attempt to raise Henry VIII's flagship, Mary Rose, after she foundered during the Battle of the Solent.

== Slaving vessel ==
In 1563, Jesus of Lübeck was chartered to a group of merchants by Queen Elizabeth I, becoming involved in the Atlantic slave trade and smuggling under John Hawkins, who organized four slave voyages to West Africa and the West Indies between 1562 and 1568.

During the last voyage, Jesus, along with several other English ships, encountered a Spanish fleet off San Juan de Ulúa (modern-day Veracruz, Mexico) in September 1568. In the resulting battle, Jesus was disabled and captured by Spanish forces. The heavily damaged ship was later sold for 601 ducats to a local merchant.

== Bibliography ==
- Pietsch, Ulrich (1981). Die Lübecker is Seeschiffahrt vom Mittelalter bis zur Neuzeit (in German). Vol. 5. Lübeck: Museum für Kunst und Kulturgeschichte. ISBN 3-9800517-1-4.
- Reinhardt, Karl (1949). "Die Karacke Jesus von Lübeck". Zeitschrift für Lübeckische Geschichte und Altertumskunde (in German). 31: 79–110.

== See also ==
- White Lion
