= Charles Ingram (disambiguation) =

Charles Ingram (born 1963) is a former British Army major convicted of cheating in the game show Who Wants to Be a Millionaire?.

Charles Ingram may also refer to:

- Charles Ingram (politician) (1696–1748), British soldier and politician
- Charles Ingram, 9th Viscount of Irvine (1727–1778), British courtier and politician, son of the above
- Charles Ingram (cricketer) (1833–1868), British doctor of medicine and cricketer
- C. A. Ingram (1867–1937), American lawyer and legislator
