= Augustus Walford Weedon =

English painter

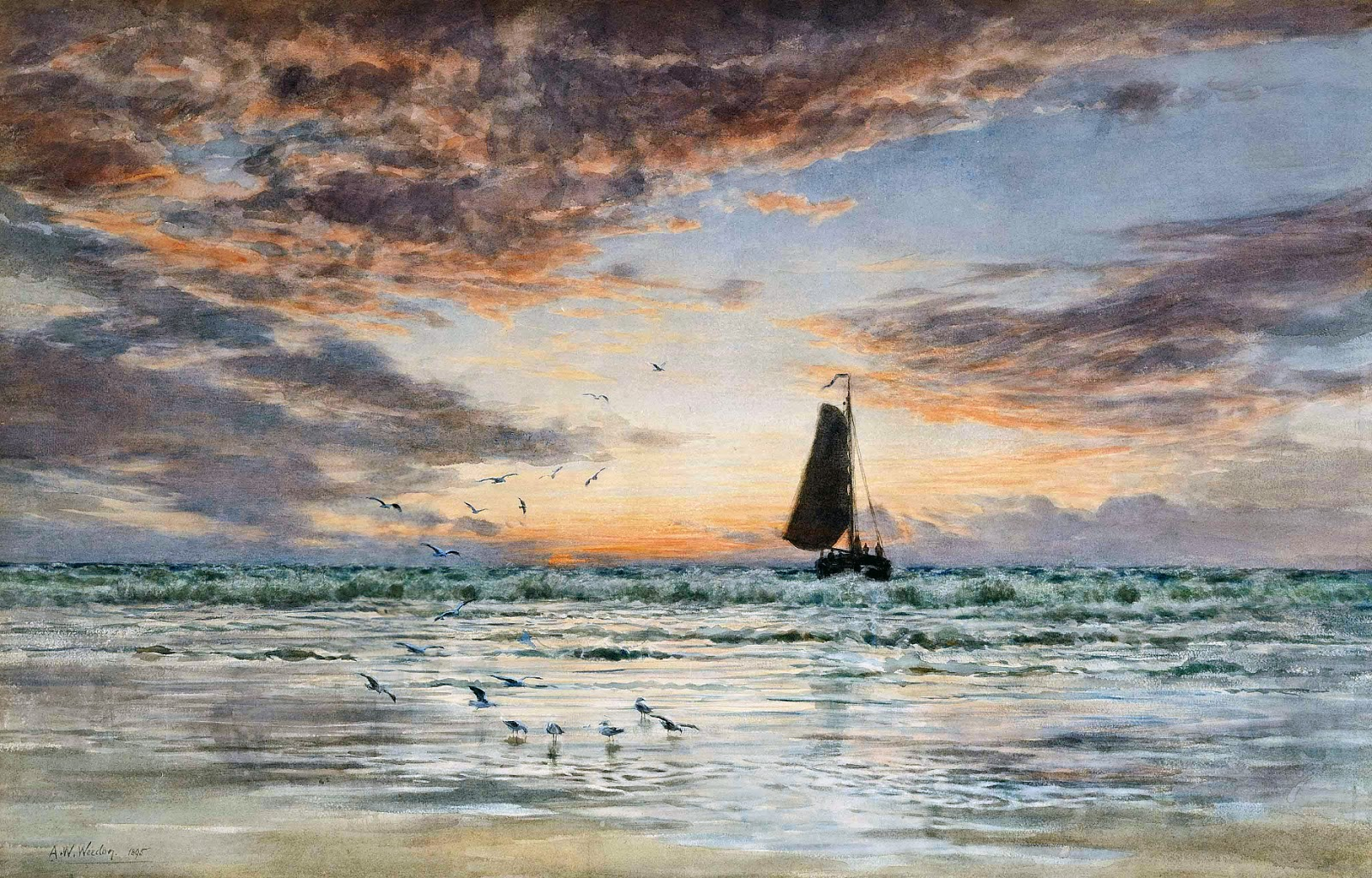
Off to the Fishing Grounds, 1895.

Augustus Walford (A.W.) Weedon was born in 1838 in London. He was a landscape painter in watercolour, and was the auditor of the Royal Society of British Artists in 1887 when James McNeill Whistler was President.

His many scenes included works from Sussex, Hampshire and Scotland and one artwork is present in the panels of the lounge at the Inn in Fittleworth. He died in 1908.
