= Mary Ann Weitnauer =

American computer engineer

- Born: Mary Ann Ingram
- Education: Georgia Tech
- Occupation: Researcher
- Known for: Vivian A. Carr Award

Mary Ann Weitnauer (née Ingram and also published as Mary Ann Ingram) is a professor of electrical and computer engineering at Georgia Tech, known for her research on optical communication, radar, wireless networks, and smart antennas.

Weitnauer graduated from Georgia Tech in 1983, and completed her Ph.D. there in 1989. She joined the Georgia Tech faculty in 1989, after completing her doctorate. At Georgia Tech, she was ADVANCE Professor of Engineering from 2006 to 2011.

Weitnauer was a visiting professor with Aalborg University, Aalborg, Denmark, from 2006 to 2008, and with Idaho National Laboratory, in 2010.

In 2017, Weitnauer was given Georgia Tech's Class of 1934 Outstanding Service Award. In the same year, the Radio Club of America gave her their Vivian A. Carr Award "for outstanding achievements by a woman in the wireless industry".
