= Marione Ingram =

German-born civil rights activist (born 1935)

Marione Ingram (né Marione Oestreicher; born November 19, 1935) is a German-born civil rights activist, Holocaust survivor, author and artist. In recent years, she has been a vocal critic of Israel's assault on Gaza.

== Early life ==
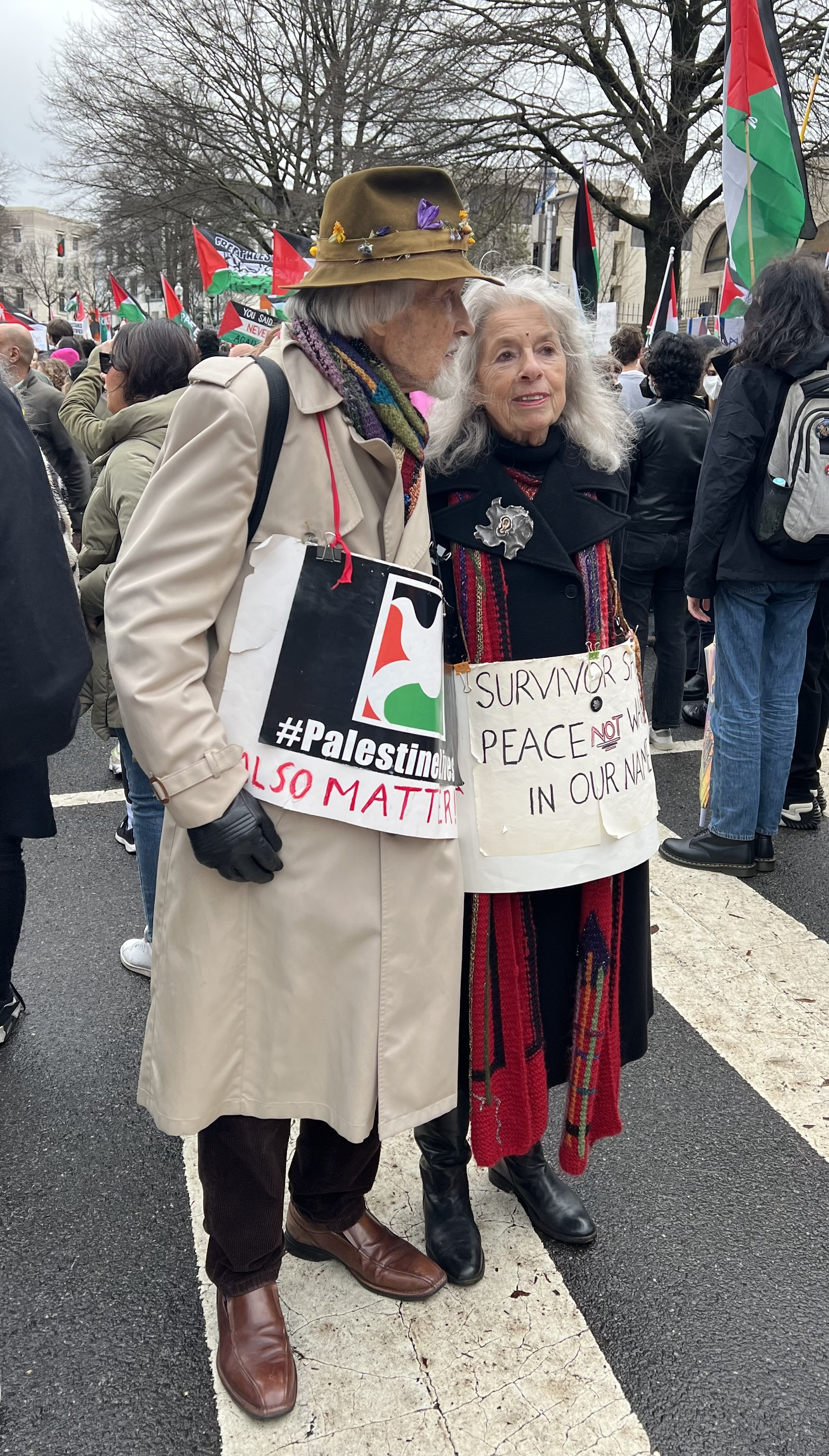
Marione and Daniel Ingram at a Protest in Front of the Israeli Embassy in Washington DC in 2024.

Ingram was born and raised in Hamburg, Germany. Her mother was Jewish, while her father, Emil Oestreicher was not; they married in 1934, prior to the outlawing of such marriages under the Nuremberg Laws. This allowed Ingram and her two sisters to avoid initial deportations of German Jews, although her father was targeted by the SS during the war because of his communist and pacifist beliefs. To avoid further suspicion or violence, Emil joined the Luftwaffe, secretly also providing help to the German resistance.

Ingram's maternal grandmother, Rosa Stinger, was deported and killed in 1941. Many relatives from her mother's side of the family were killed. In July 1943, Ingram's mother received notice that she and her daughters would be deported, and sent the girls to hide with relatives. She then attempted suicide, which was unsuccessful due to Ingram's intervention, as the seven-year-old had returned to the apartment. However, the two were not deported due to the bombing of Hamburg during Operation Gomorrah a few days later. During the bombing, Ingram and her mother were unable to stay in bomb shelters due to their Jewish identity. Following the bombing, the two went into hiding for a year and a half, until the end of the war. Her father and two sisters also survived the war.

She immigrated to the United States in 1952, shortly before her 17th birthday.

== Activism ==
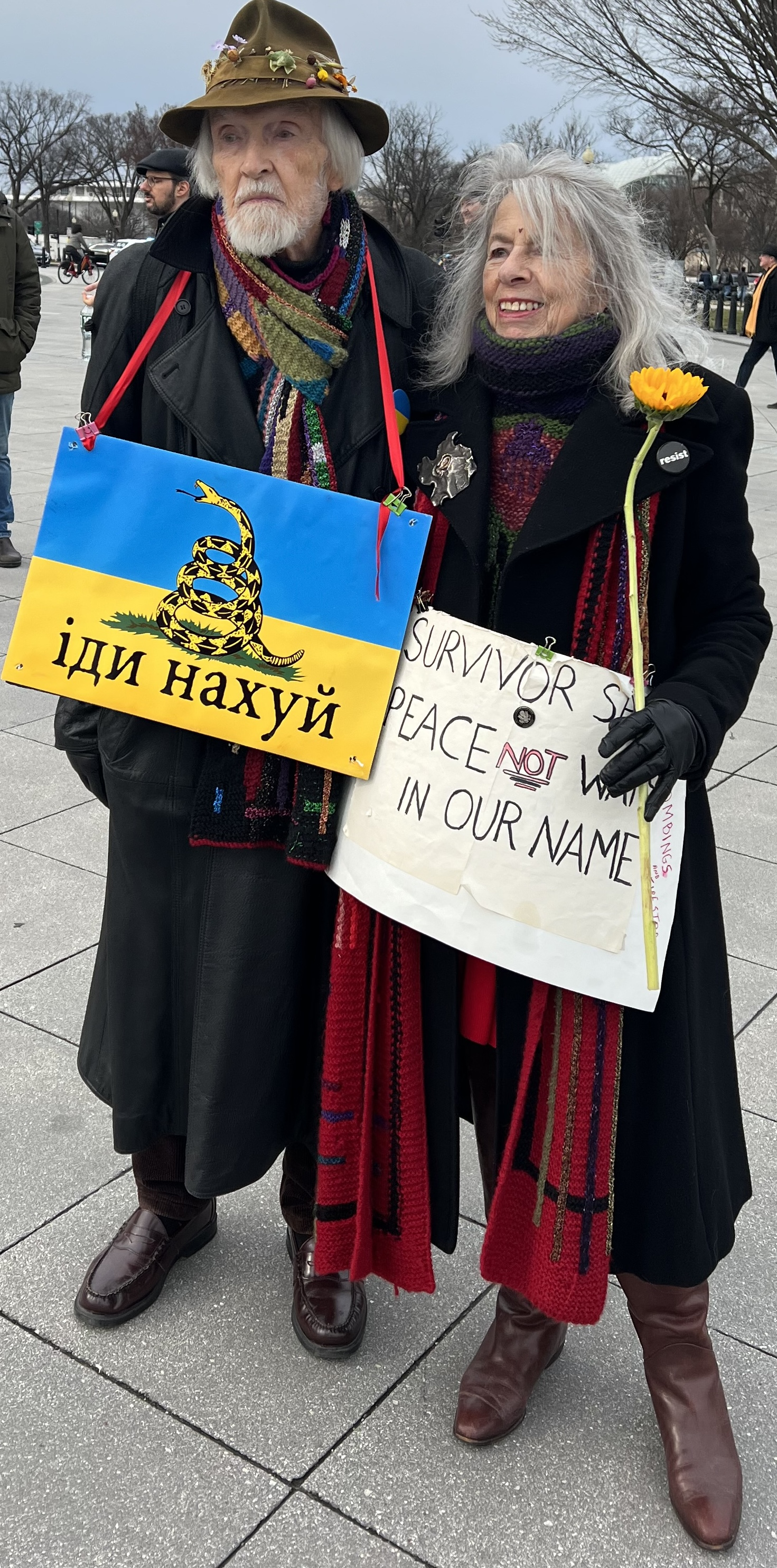
Marione and Daniel Ingram at a pro-Ukrainian protest in Washington DC in 2023

In the United States she saw the racism experienced by African Americans, and connected it to the persecution she had experienced as a Jew in Germany. This ultimately led Ingram to join the American Civil Rights Movement, and open a Freedom School in Mississippi. In the 1960s, Ingram volunteered with the 1963 March on Washington and the Student Nonviolent Coordinating Committee as part of the 1964 Freedom Summer project.

Starting in 2023, Marione Ingram and her husband Daniel began protesting the Israeli's assault on the Gaza Strip by demonstrating in front of the White House and calling for a ceasefire. In response to her calls for a ceasefire, Ingram claimed that her talks in Hamburg, Germany had been cancelled. In 2023, she publicly called for President Joe Biden to stop supporting the genocide in Gaza.

Ingram has also been a vocal critic of Donald Trump and his administration. During Trump's second term she highlighted the parallels she sees between 1930s Germany and contemporary America under Trump's administration. She was a participant in the 2025 People's March on Washington, where she and others protested Trump.

== Publications ==
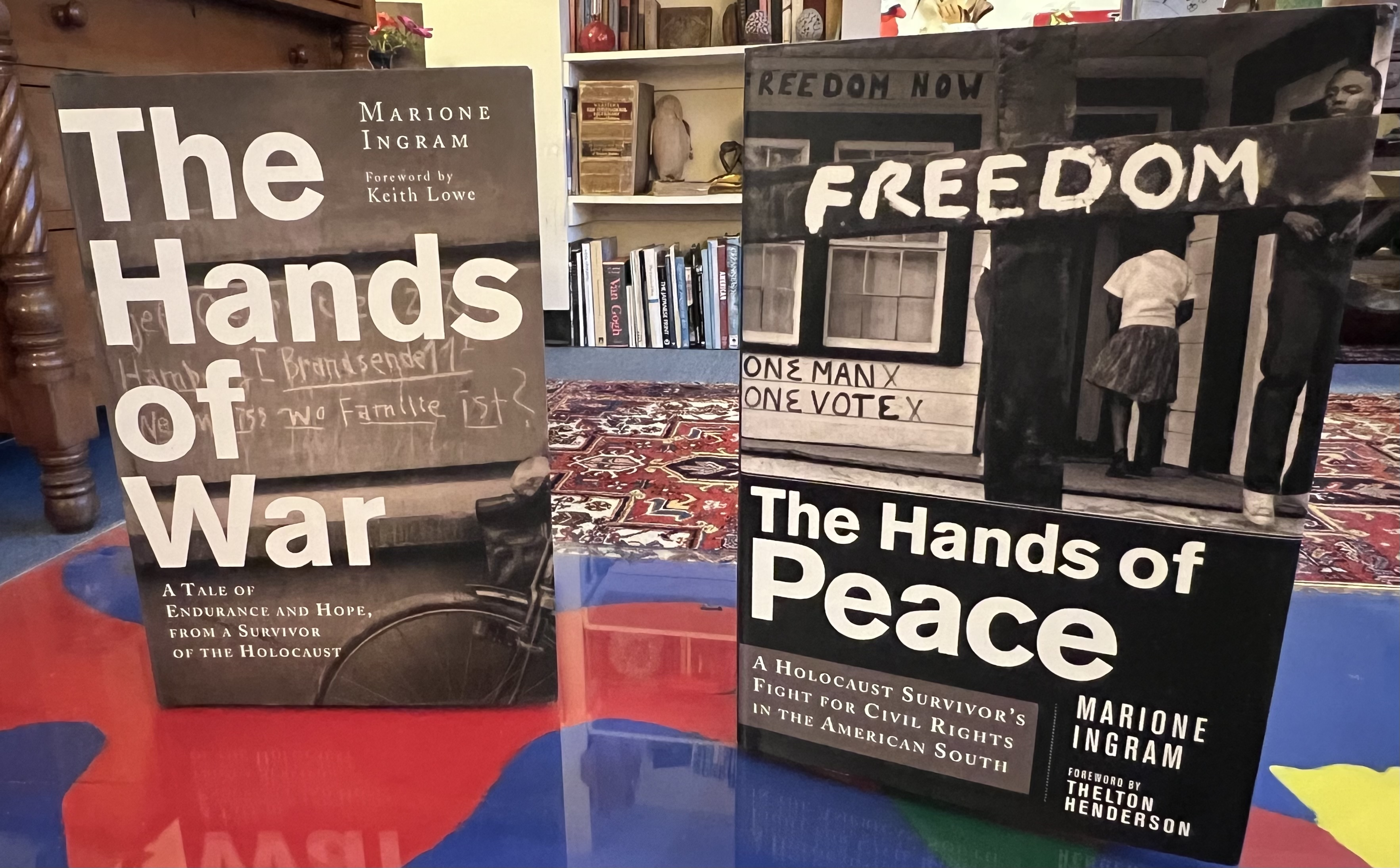
Both of Marione Ingram's books on a table.

Marione Ingram has authored two books based on her life experience. The first book, The Hands of War: A Tale of Endurance and Hope, from a Survivor of the Holocaust, recounts her experience as a child survivor of the Holocaust. Her second book, The Hands of Peace: A Holocaust Survivor's Fight for Civil Rights in the American South, recounts her experiences during the American Civil Rights Movement, including working on campaigns in Mississippi.

== Personal life ==
Ingram is married to Daniel Ingram. The couple have one son and two grandchildren, and currently live in Washington, D.C..

Following the reelection of Ronald Reagan, Ingram and her husband, Daniel, moved to Europe in protest. They moved back to the United States in the early 2000s.

== Performances ==
Ingram has appeared in a stage adaptation of Agota Kristof's The Notebook Trilogy, "Das große Heft." The play premiered in late 2025 at the Deutsches Schauspielhaus in Hamburg and was directed by Karin Henkel. In this adaptation of the play, Ingram and six other survivors of Operation Gomorrah, share their stories of survival in the middle of the narrative of the play. Ingram recounts that Operation Gomorrah saved her life by preventing the Nazis from deporting her to Theresienstadt. Ingram's performance was praised by critics.
