= Arthur Ingram (disambiguation) =

Arthur Ingram (ca. 1565 – 1642) was an English politician.

Arthur Ingram may also refer to:

- Arthur Ingram, 3rd Viscount of Irvine (1666–1702), English Member of Parliament and peer
- Arthur Ingram, 6th Viscount of Irvine (1689–1736), British landowner and politician
- Arthur B. Ingram, Virginia and Iowa legislator
- Arthur Ingram (died 1742), member of Parliament for Horsham

== See also ==
- Arthur Winnington-Ingram (1858-1946), Bishop of London
- Arthur Winnington-Ingram (Archdeacon of Hereford) (1888-1965)
