= George Ingram =

Recipient of the Victoria Cross

George Ingram VC MM
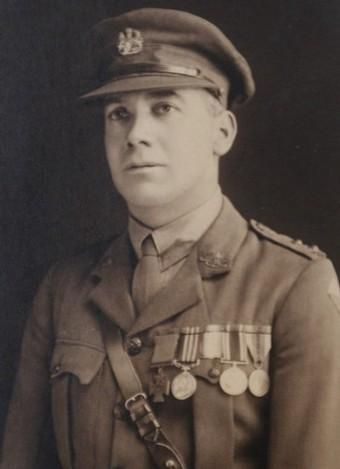
- George Ingram c.1919
- Born: 18 March 1889; Bendigo, Victoria
- Died: 30 June 1961 (aged 72); Hastings, Victoria
- Burial place: Frankston Cemetery
- Military career
- Allegiance: Australia
- Branch: Citizen Military Forces; Australian Imperial Force
- Service years: 1905–1919; 1939–1944
- Rank: Captain
- Conflicts: First World War; Asian and Pacific Theatre; Western Front; Battle of Passchendaele; Battle of St. Quentin Canal; Second World War
- Awards: Victoria Cross; Military Medal

George Morby Ingram, VC, MM (18 March 1889 – 30 June 1961) was an Australian carpenter, soldier and a recipient of the Victoria Cross, the highest decoration for gallantry "in the face of the enemy" that can be awarded to members of the British and Commonwealth armed forces. Ingram became Australia's final recipient of the Victoria Cross during the First World War following his actions during an attack on the village of Montbrehain in France. Leading a platoon during the engagement, he instigated several charges against a number of German strong points that eventuated in the seizure of ten machine guns and sixty-two prisoners, as well as inflicting high casualties.

Born in the Victorian town of Bendigo, Ingram was apprenticed as a carpenter and joiner upon leaving school. Joining the militia at the age of fourteen, he later settled in Melbourne where he worked as a building contractor. Following the outbreak of the First World War, Ingram enlisted in the Australian Naval and Military Expeditionary Force and served on New Guinea before receiving his discharge in early 1916. Enlisting in the Australian Imperial Force on the same day, he embarked for the Western Front. He was decorated with the Military Medal following his actions as a member of a bombing section during an attack on Bapaume. Commissioned as a second lieutenant in June 1918, Ingram returned to Australia in 1919 where he was discharged soon after. Re-settling in Melbourne, he was employed as a foreman for a building contractor company. Enlisting for service in the Second World War, he was allotted to the Royal Australian Engineers and achieved the rank of captain before being placed on the Retired List in 1944. Ingram died in 1961 at the age of 72.

== Early life ==
Ingram was born in Bendigo, Victoria, on 18 March 1889 to George Ronald Ingram, a farmer, and his wife Charlotte (née Hubbard). Initially educated at the Lilydale State School, he left school at age fourteen and was apprenticed as a carpenter and joiner. Joining the militia at this time, he was attached to No. 7 Company of the Australian Garrison Artillery and in 1906 attended a military exhibition in New Zealand as a member of the Australian contingent. Completing his apprenticeship, Ingram moved to Caulfield, Melbourne, where he entered into business as a building contractor. On 19 January 1910, Ingram married Jane Francis Nichols in a Congregational ceremony at East Prahran.

== First World War ==
On 10 December 1914, Ingram enlisted as a private in the 3rd Battalion, Australian Naval and Military Expeditionary Force at South Yarra. Initially posted for service on the newly captured German territory of New Guinea, he returned to Australia 6 December 1915, and was discharged on 19 January with the rank of corporal. That same day, he enlisted in the Australian Imperial Force and was allotted to the 16th Reinforcements of the 24th Battalion as a private. In October, Ingram embarked with the unit from Melbourne aboard HMAT Nestor. Arriving in France, he was appointed acting corporal and joined the 24th Battalion in January 1917.

On the night of 15/16 March 1917, Ingram took part in the battalion's attack on the village of Bapaume during the German withdrawal to the Hindenburg Line. Posted to a bombing section during the engagement, he became involved in a fight with German troops who outnumbered his unit. Making effective use of their grenades, the unit was able to hold off the German attack. Later during the assault, the German forces returned in large numbers, forcing the bombing section to retreat. Ingram, in conjunction with two others, covered the party's withdrawal which thus minimised casualties. For his actions during the battle, Ingram was awarded the Military Medal, the citation noting his "... great courage and initiative ...". The announcement of the award was published in a supplement to the London Gazette on 11 May 1917.

Promoted to temporary sergeant on 18 March, Ingram fell ill in April and was hospitalised in Britain until June when he was deemed fit to return to his battalion. He was hospitalised once again in September after dislocating his knee, and upon returning to his unit on 10 October he was made company sergeant major. It was at this time that the Australian focus for the remainder of the year was to be the Ypres sector in Belgium, and as such the 24th Battalion participated in the Battle of Passchendaele. During this time, Ingram was recommended for a commission in the 24th Battalion as a second lieutenant, which was confirmed on 20 June 1918. Three days later, however, he was once again admitted to hospital suffering from an illness, and as such was unable to assume his duties as an officer until 12 July when he returned to the battalion.

=== Victoria Cross ===
On 4 October 1918, the 24th Battalion took part in the attack that captured the Beaurevoir sector in France, and was, therefore, expecting to have a rest the following day when the unit was unexpectedly ordered to take part in another attack. The assault was to commence at 06:05 from the village of Remicourt, and lead to the capture of Montbrehain by the 21st and 24th Battalions with tanks to provide support. The action was to prove the final engagement for the Australian infantry during the war, and it was during this attack that Ingram was to earn the Victoria Cross; the sixty-fourth, and final, Australian to do so during the First World War.

At the designated time, the two infantry battalions commenced the attack under the cover of an artillery barrage. The advance was heavily counter-attacked by German machine gun and artillery fire, but the Australians managed to continue despite the late arrival of the tanks. Approximately 100 yards (91 m) from the German trenches, the 24th Battalion's B Company—in which Ingram was commanding a platoon—became the object of severe sniper and machine gun fire, halting the unit's advance. Under the cover of a Lewis Gun, Ingram dashed ahead of his men and led them against the German strong point. After a fierce fight, the platoon succeeded in capturing nine machine guns and killing all forty-two Germans who had occupied the line; Ingram accounting for at least eighteen of them himself.

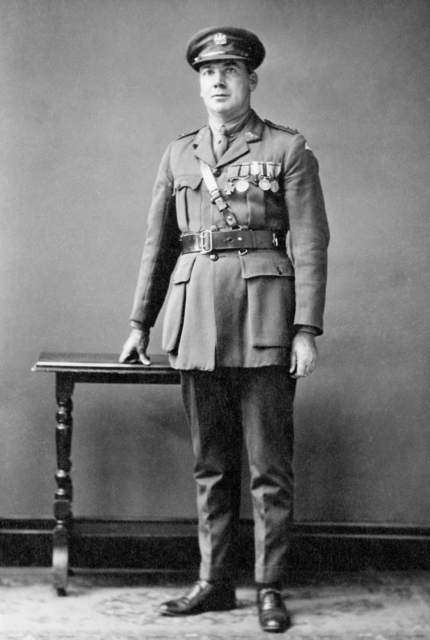
Lt. G.M. Ingram

Soon after, the company came under heavy fire from an old quarry occupied by over one hundred German soldiers who possessed as many as forty machine guns. Severe casualties were sustained as they began to advance for attack, including the company commander who fell seriously wounded. Taking command of the attack, Ingram rallied the men and rushed forward. Jumping into the quarry, he charged the first post himself, shooting six German soldiers and capturing a machine gun. The German forces were soon overcome, and thirty troops subsequently surrendered.

While his men were clearing up the remaining German positions, Ingram scouted ahead in search of machine gun nests in the village. He soon located one positioned in a house, which had been firing through the cellar ventilator. Managing to enter the house, he shot the gunner through the ventilator. He fired several more shots into the cellar before rushing to the head of the cellar stairs. By thus cutting off any means of escape, a further thirty Germans were taken prisoner.

The battle for Montbrehain raged until 20:00 that night, during which time the line had been linked up and consolidated. The casualties of the 24th Battalion had been so high that two companies of the 27th Battalion had to be attached for support; the 24th Battalion left the frontline for the last time on 6 October.

The full citation for Ingram's Victoria Cross appeared in a supplement to the London Gazette on 6 January 1919, it read:

War Office, 6th January, 1919.

His Majesty the KING has been graciously pleased to approve of the award of the Victoria Cross to the undermentioned Officers, Non-commissioned Officers and Men: —

Lt. George Morby Ingram, M.M., 24th Bn., A.I.F.

For most conspicuous bravery and initiative during the attack on Montbrehain, East of Peronne, on 5th October, 1918. When early in the advance his platoon was held up by a strong point, Lt. Ingram, without hesitation, dashed out and rushed the post at the head of his men, capturing nine machine guns and killing 42 enemy after stubborn resistance.

Later, when the company had suffered severe casualties from enemy posts, and many leaders had fallen, he at once took control of the situation, rallied his men under intense fire, and led them forward. He himself rushed the first post, shot six of the enemy, and captured a machine gun, thus overcoming serious resistance.

On two subsequent occasions he again displayed great dash and resource in the capture of enemy posts, inflicting many casualties and taking 62 prisoners.

Throughout the whole day he showed the most inspiring example of courage and leadership, and freely exposed himself regardless of danger.

Ingram was promoted to lieutenant on 24 October, and was training away from the frontline with his battalion when the Armistice was signed on 11 November 1918; thus ending the war. On 25 February 1919, Ingram was decorated with his Victoria Cross by King George V in the ballroom of Buckingham Palace. Boarding a troopship bound for Australia soon after, he arrived in Melbourne on 5 March and was discharged from the Australian Imperial Force on 2 June.

== Later life ==
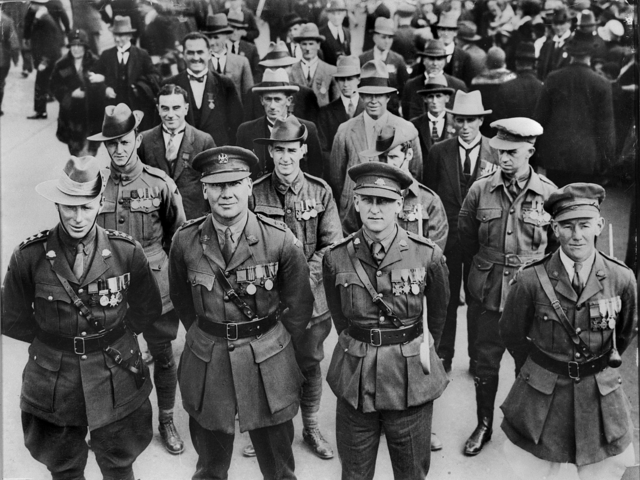
A group of Victoria Cross recipients lined up to march in the 1927 Melbourne Anzac Day march. Ingram is front row, second from left.

Following his discharge, Ingram re-settled in Melbourne and gained employment as a general foreman with E. A. & Frank Watts Pty Ltd, building contractors. In 1926, Ingram's marriage with his wife Jane was dissolved upon his instigation on the grounds of desertion on her behalf. On 10 February the following year, he married Lillian Wakeling (née Hart), a widow, at the Methodist parsonage, Malvern; the pair were later to have one son.

On 11 November 1929, Ingram attended the Victoria dinner for recipients of the Victoria Cross in Melbourne. Following the completion of Melbourne's Shrine of Remembrance in 1935, Ingram was chosen as a member of its permanent guard. There had been 250 applications for the position, of which only fourteen were appointed; Ingram being one of the earliest. Following the outbreak of the Second World War, Ingram once again volunteered his services and enlisted in the militia on 17 November 1939. Posted to a unit in the Royal Australian Engineers, he achieved the rank of captain before being placed on the Retired List on 6 May 1944.

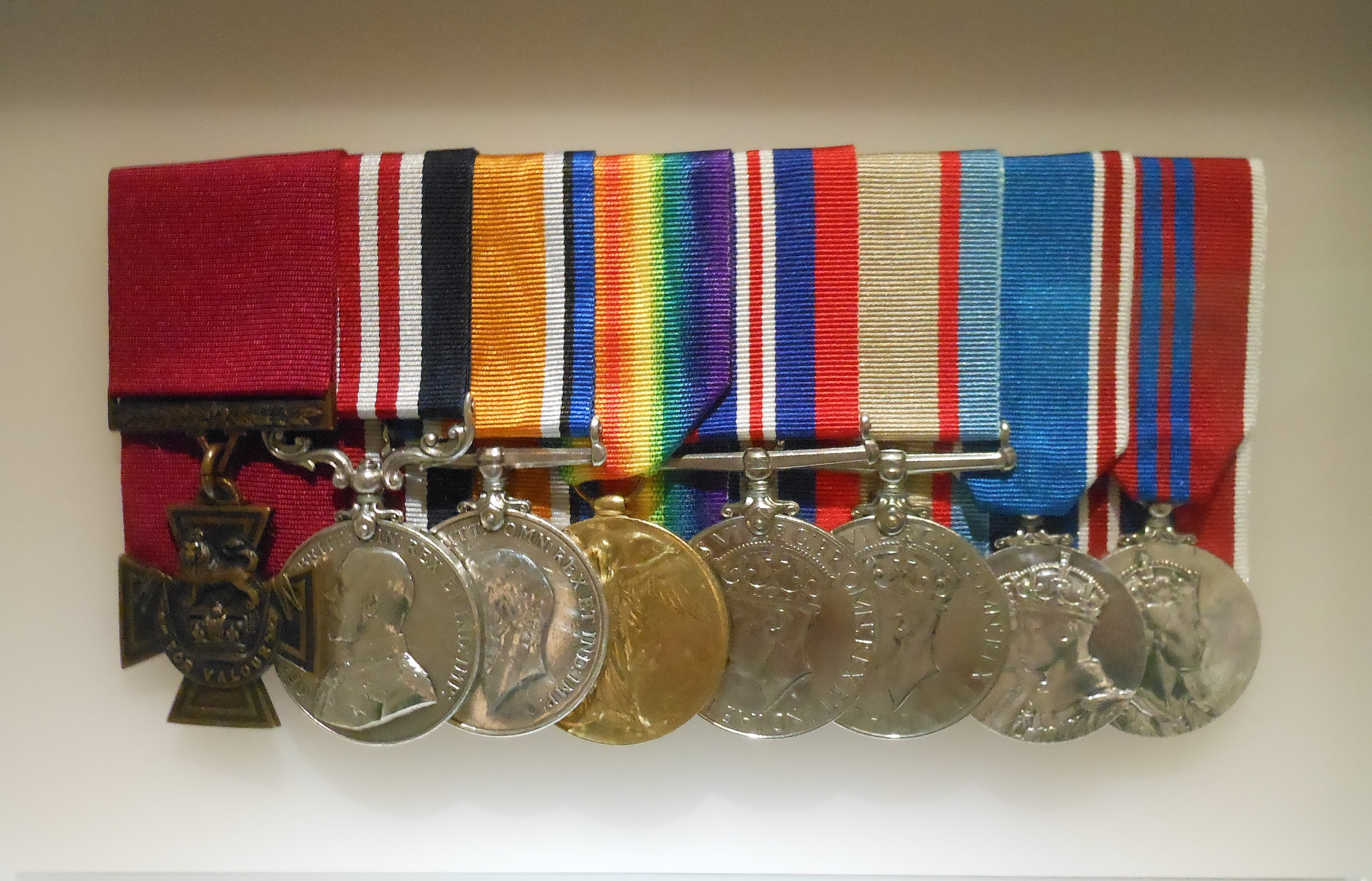
George Ingram's medals at the Australian War Memorial, Canberra.

Ingram's wife Lillian died in May 1951, and on 24 December of the same year he married another widow, Myrtle Lydia Thomas (née Cornell), in a ceremony at Brunswick Methodist Church; the couple later had a son, Alex. In 1954, Ingram attended the dedication of the Shrine of Remembrance by Queen Elizabeth II and the Duke of Edinburgh on 28 February following an expansion on the monument to encompass Australia's contributions to the Second World War. Two years later, he joined the Australian contingent of Victoria Cross recipients who attended the parade in London's Hyde Park to commemorate the centenary of the institution of the Victoria Cross.

Ingram died of coronary vascular disease at his home in Hastings, Victoria, on 30 June 1961, and was buried at Frankston Cemetery. He is commemorated by a street name in Canberra. On 27 May 2008, the Victoria Cross, Military Medal and campaign medals awarded to Ingram were sold at auction by Sotheby's of Melbourne for A$478,000. The medals were sold on behalf of Ingram's son, Alex, who was concerned about the security of the group and was experiencing financial strain. The purchaser, rumoured to be media mogul Kerry Stokes, indicated that the Victoria Cross would be donated to the Australian War Memorial in Canberra. This subsequently took place, and Ingram's medals are displayed in the Memorial's Hall of Valour.
