= Adam Ingram =

Adam Ingram may refer to:

- Adam Ingram (Labour politician) (born 1947), Scottish politician
- Adam Ingram (SNP politician) (born 1951), Scottish politician
