= Peter Ingram (cricketer, born 1869) =

Scottish cricketer (1869–1955)

Peter Robert Ingram (21 February 1869 – 8 December 1955 (aged 86)) played first-class cricket for Somerset in two matches in 1910. He was born near Inverurie, Aberdeenshire, Scotland and died at Perranporth, Cornwall.

Ingram was a lower order left-handed batsman and a slow left-arm orthodox spin bowler. At the age of 41, he played in two matches inside a week for Somerset and failed to take a wicket in either of them; both matches were lost within two days. In his first match, however, he caught Frank Woolley when the Kent batsman had made 99. And in the second he scored seven runs in each innings and these were jointly his highest first-class innings.
