= Miles Philips =

English mariner

- Occupation: Mariner

Miles Philips (fl. 1587) was an English mariner.

== Biography ==
Philips was with Captain John Hawkyns in his voyage of 1568, and was one of the 114 who were put on shore near Panuco after the disaster at San Juan de Lua. After losing many of their companions in skirmishes with the Indians, they reached Panuco, where the Spanish governor thrust them into a filthy dungeon, and threatened to hang them. They were afterwards sent to Mexico and allotted as servants, each Spaniard who took one being bound to produce him when called on. After several months in Mexico as a domestic servant, Philips was appointed overseer at a silver mine, where in the course of three or four years he accumulated some four thousand pieces of eight. But in 1574 the inquisition was established in Mexico, and, by way of a beginning, the inquisition seized all the English, stripped them of the money they had saved, and charged them with being Lutheran heretics. Philips, with others, was required to say the paternoster, Ave Maria, and the creed in Latin, and was questioned as to his belief concerning the bread and wine after consecration. Many of them were cruelly racked; and after close and solitary imprisonment for upwards of a year and a half, they were brought up for judgment. Three of the party were sentenced to be burnt; several to be severely flogged and to serve in the galleys for six, eight, or ten years. Philips was condemned to serve five years in a monastery, wearing ‘a fool's coat or San Benito’ of yellow cotton with red crosses on it.

When the five years came to an end he was allowed to go free, but not to quit the country. He bound himself for three years to a silk-weaver. Afterwards, on news of Francis Drake having landed at Acapulco, he was sent there as interpreter, with a body of two hundred soldiers. After searching along the coast to Panama, and learning that Drake had certainly departed, they returned to Mexico, and, a month later, Philips succeeded in escaping to Vera Cruz, where he hoped to get on board a ship. He was, however, apprehended, but managed to escape to the woods, where he fell in with some Indians, who guided him to Puerto de Cavallos in Honduras, whence he obtained a passage to Havana. There he entered as a soldier, and was sent to Spain. At San Lucar he was denounced as an Englishman, but he got away to Seville, afterwards entered again as a soldier on board a galley bound to Majorca, and there found an English ship which carried him to England. He landed at Poole in February 1581 – 1582.

Such is the outline of the story told by Philips himself to Hakluyt; but beyond the facts that he was put on shore by Hawkyns, that the inquisition was established in Mexico in 1574, and that he returned to England, it is uncorroborated. The outlines of his story may however be true.

Having arrived in England in February 1581–2, Philips would seem to have sailed from Southampton with John Drake in the following May. On 29 Jan. 1586–7 he was rescued by Captain Lister of the Clifford near the Earl of Cumberland's watering-place on the River Plate, that is, close to where John Drake was wrecked in 1582. He appears to have returned to England in the Clifford.
