= James Ingram (disambiguation) =

James Ingram (1952–2019) was an American R&B singer.

James Ingram may also refer to:

- James Ingram (academic) (1774–1850), English academic
- James Ingram (diplomat) (born 1928), Australian company director, public servant and diplomat
- James Ingram (minister) (1776–1879), Church of Scotland minister
- Sir James Herbert Charles Ingram, 4th Baronet (born 1966) of the Ingram baronets
- James M. Ingram (politician), of Texas Senate, District 2
- James Ingram, engaged to actress Brittany Curran

== See also ==
- James Ingram Merrill (1926–1995), American poet
- Jimmy Ingram (1928–1998), American pilot and racing driver
