= Charles Ingram (cricketer) =

English doctor and cricketer

Charles Penfold Ingram (24 April 1833 – 20 August 1868) was an English doctor of medicine and a cricketer who played first-class cricket for Cambridge University in 1854 and 1859. The son of Hugh Ingram (1790–1863), a surgeon, and his wife Mary Bostock (1796–1879), he was born at Steyning in Sussex and died there as well.

Ingram played as a lower order batsman and bowler for Cambridge against the Marylebone Cricket Club (MCC) in June 1854, scoring 14 and 10 and taking a single wicket; after this, he was picked for the 1854 University match against Oxford University where he played as an opening batsman, scoring 4 and 2, and did not bowl. He reappeared for Cambridge in a single game in London against MCC in 1859, at which time he was working as a doctor at St Bartholomew's Hospital.

== Career outside cricket ==
Ingram was educated at Westminster School, where he was a Queen's Scholar, and at Trinity College, Cambridge. He graduated as a Bachelor of Arts in 1855, achieved his Bachelor of Medicine degree in 1857 and was a Doctor of Medicine in 1860; he was also a member of the Royal College of Physicians from 1859. As a doctor, he practised in London.

In 1863, Ingram was charged with assaulting an Italian organ-grinder who had refused to move from outside his house in Guilford Street. Ingram was acquitted, but ordered to pay three shillings for damage to the organ; in the newspaper report, he told the court he had treated up to 100 patients that day at the Hospital for Consumption at Victoria Park in the East End of London (now London Chest Hospital) and had eaten and drunk heavily before returning home.
