= William Ayerst Ingram =

English painter

- Born: 27 April 1855; Twickenham, Surrey, England
- Died: 20 March 1913 (aged 57); Falmouth, Cornwall, England
- Education: A.W. Weedon, John Steeple
- Known for: Painter

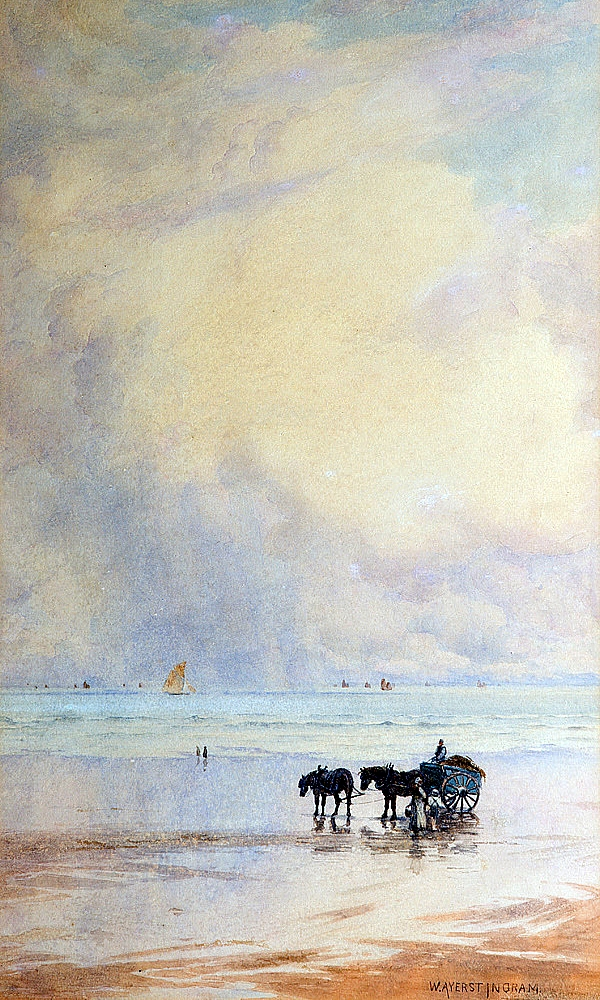
Horse And Cart on Beach, watercolour

William Ayerst Ingram or W. Ayerst Ingram RBA (27 April 1855 Twickenham, Surrey (Note: He was not born in Glasgow as otherwise published. Ingram's birth certificate is lodged in the WCAA collection as researched and catalogued by George Bednar. Addison, et al. state that Ingram was born to "Scotch parentage", so his mother may have been Scottish as well.) – 20 March 1913 Falmouth, Cornwall) was a painter and member of the Newlyn School. He did notable Landscape art and Marine art. In 1906 he joined the Royal Institute of Oil Painters and in 1907 he joined the Royal Institute of Painters in Water Colours.

== Personal life and education ==
William Ayerst Ingram was born on 27 April 1855 in Twickenham, Middlesex, England. His father, Rev G. S. Ingram, was born in Glasgow, Scotland and served as the minister of Twickenham Congregational Church 1854-1864 and Vineyard Congregational Church, Richmond, Surrey 1864-1888. Ingram was the third son born to Reverend G.S. Ingram and his mother. It was first accepted that William would become a businessman, so it was later in his life that he began exploring artistic pursuits by studying with A.W. Weedon and John Steeple.

In 1882 Ingram moved to the Cornwall town of Falmouth. He married May Martha Fay, an American, by 1896. The couple lived in Tregurrian in Falmouth in 1911. Ingram died on 20 March 1913 in Falmouth.

== Career ==
He set up a studio in Chelsea, London. The same year he also founded the Anglo-Australian Society and was established as its President. By this time Ingram had well-travelled, including travels to Australia, according to a fellow artist and friend, George Percy Jacomb-Hood. He became the Royal British Colonial Society of Artists' President in 1888.

Having moved to Cornwall in 1882, Ingram established friendships with people from the Newlyn School, including Laura and Harold Knight.

In 1894 Ingram and two good friends Jack Downing and Henry Scott Tuke established the Falmouth Art Gallery. From 1902 to 1904 Ingram was the Royal Cornwall Polytechnic Society's Vice-President in Falmouth. His works for 1893 A P. & O. Voyage and 1902 Waters of the Old and New Worlds exhibits reflected his world-wide travel experiences. A Saturday Review of A P. & O. Voyage stated that Ingram was adroit at capturing the "convexity" of the sea waves, but fell short in capturing the reality of some of the scenes, such as of the Australian coast, which "for the most part is incredibly monotonous both in colour and scenery..."

== Works ==
Ingram's works included outdoor scenes, such as seascapes and landscapes, generally in oil and watercolour. A partial list of Ingram's work is:

- A Highland Landscape With Figures Near A Loch, watercolour
- A Noontime Rest, watercolour
- A Sailing Ship at Sea, watercolour
- A Snow Covered Forest, watercolour
- A Tidal Harbour, oil
- An English Two Mast Top Sail Schooner Off Falmouth, watercolour
- At Anchor, oil
- Cockle Gatherers, watercolour
- Falmouth, watercolour
- Falmouth Bay, bodycolour and watercolour
- Falmouth Harbour, watercolour
- Falmouth Town from the Water
- Fishing boat in the Hayle estuary
- HM Training Ship 'Ganges' Uploading Grain – Falmouth
- Holyloch Argyllshire, oil
- Horse And Cart On Beach
- Loch Ranua Castle, oil
- Moored Alongside in a River Estuary, watercolour
- Morphets
- Mussel gathering at Low Tide
- Newlyn Harbour, 1884
- Restronguet Point and Feock
- Sailing Boats In A Choppy Sea, watercolour
- Sailing Boats Off The Cornish Coast, watercolour
- Sailing Ship At Sea
- Sailing Ship at Sea with Ghost Freighter, oil
- Seascape With Sailing Vessel In Foreground, watercolour
- Ship At First Light, oil
- Ship of the Line under Tow
- Shipping
- Ships at Sea, watercolour
- Still Life With Ducks, A Basket Of Fruit And A Pot On A Ledge
- The End of the Voyage, 1894, oil
- The First Flood, oil
- The Harbour Under the Hill, 1880, pencil and watercolor
- The Home Port, Falmouth, 1912
- The Return of the Herring Boats, watercolour
- The Rising Moon, oil
- The Seaweed Gatherer, watercolour
- The Wreck, watercolour
- Trawler Becalmed Off Torquay, watercolour
- Trawlers at Tenby, 1889
- Whitby, watercolour
- Yachts Becalmed, watercolour

His works, which have been compared to those of the painter Henry Moore and are in the collections of the Art Gallery of New South Wales, Art Gallery of South Australia; Public Galleries in Otago, New Zealand and Bendigo, Victoria and the Guildhall Art Gallery, London.

== Memberships ==
Ingram was a member and Vice-President or President of some of the following organisations:

- Anglo-Australian Society – Founder and President
- Royal British Colonial Society of Artists – 1888 President
- Royal Cornwall Polytechnic Society, Falmouth (RCPS) – 1901–03, Vice-President 1902–04
- Royal Institute of Painters in Water Colours – 1907
- Royal Institute of Oil Painters – 1906
- Royal Society of British Artists
- Royal Society of Painter-Etchers

== Exhibitions ==
Ingram exhibited at Dowdeswells, Royal Academy, Royal Society of British Artists, Whitechapel, NWS in 1886 and the Fine Art Society in 1888 and 1902.

== Gallery ==
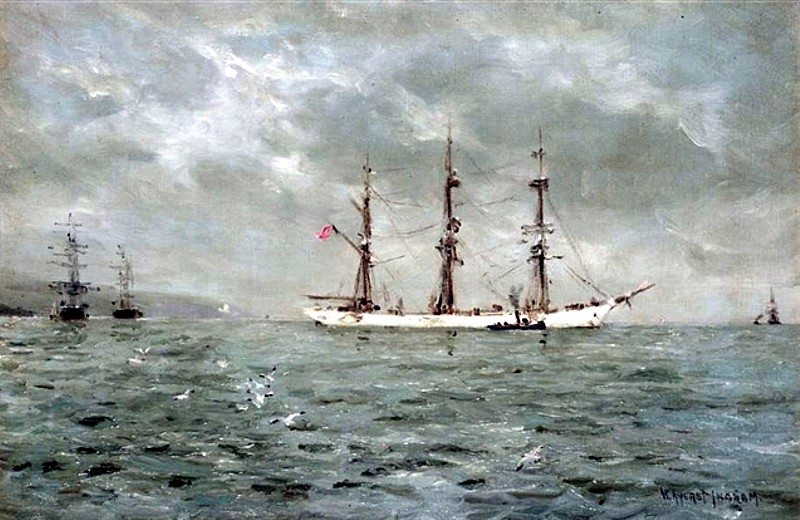
At Anchor, oil on canvas

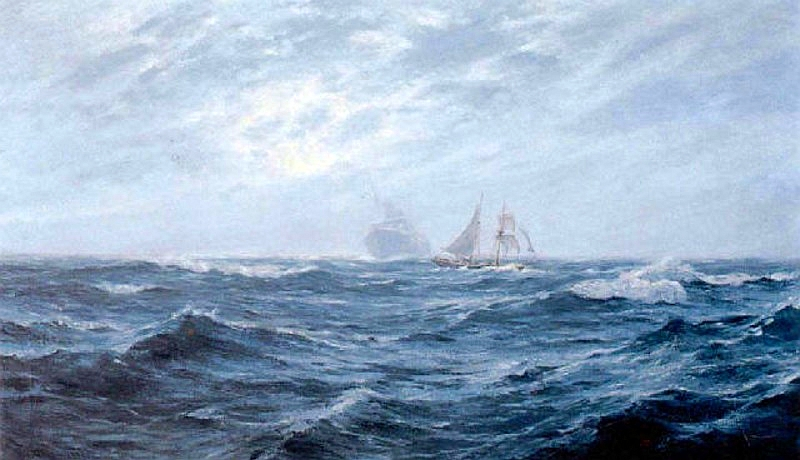
Sailing Ship at Sea, oil on canvas
