= William T. Ingram =

William Thomas Ingram, Jr. Ph.D.
- Born: March 24, 1913; Pine Bluff, Arkansas, US
- Died: July 17, 2001 (aged 88); Memphis, Tennessee, US
- Occupations: Minister, Professor, Seminary President
- Years active: 1946-1978
- Known for: President of Memphis Theological Seminary
- Spouse: Virginia Howell
- Children: 2

Academic background
- Education: Vanderbilt University
- Thesis: "Missionary Content of Contemporary American Theology" (1956)

William T. Ingram, Jr. (March 24, 1913 – July 17, 2001) was an American minister and theologian. He served as the first President of Memphis Theological Seminary from 1964 to 1978.

== Early life and education ==
Ingram was born in 1913 in Pine Bluff, Arkansas, the first of four children born to William T. Ingram, Sr. and Lillian B. Johnston. His father was a Cumberland Presbyterian minister. His brother, Joe Lynn Ingram, was also a minister. He graduated high school in Marshall, Texas in 1931 and received a bachelor's degree from Texas Christian University in 1934. He went on to receive a master's degree from Southern Methodist University in 1935, a bachelor of divinity degree from Bethel College in 1937, and a doctorate from Vanderbilt University in 1956.

== Career ==
Ingram was ordained as a minister in the Cumberland Presbyterian Church on September 9, 1933, and served in various churches in Texas from 1933 to 1935, before moving to Tennessee in 1936. He continued as a minister for various Cumberland Presbyterian congregations in West Tennessee from 1936 until 1954. During World War II, he served as a chaplain in the United States Army.

In 1946, following his military service, Ingram was named Professor of Missions at the Cumberland Presbyterian Theological Seminary in McKenzie, Tennessee, and later elevated to Dean in 1962. In 1964, Ingram was named President of the seminary and led the institution's move to Memphis, Tennessee, where it was re-named as the Memphis Theological Seminary. He oversaw the Seminary's operations for the next 14 years, retiring as President following the end of the Spring semester of 1978. During his tenure, the institution faced numerous financial issues, but expanded its ecumenical mission through increasing its diversity, including Jewish and African Methodist Episcopal faculty, and a student body that included Catholic, Episcopalian, Methodist, and Baptist students.

== Death ==
Ingram died on July 17, 2001 in Memphis of heart disease at the age of 88.

== Bibliography ==
- A History of Memphis Theological Seminary of the Cumberland Presbyterian Church 1852-1990: With a Brief Survey of Theological Education in the Cumberland Presbyterian Church from its Beginning in 1810. Memphis, Tennessee: Memphis Theological Seminary Press, 1990.
