= John Ingram (engraver) =

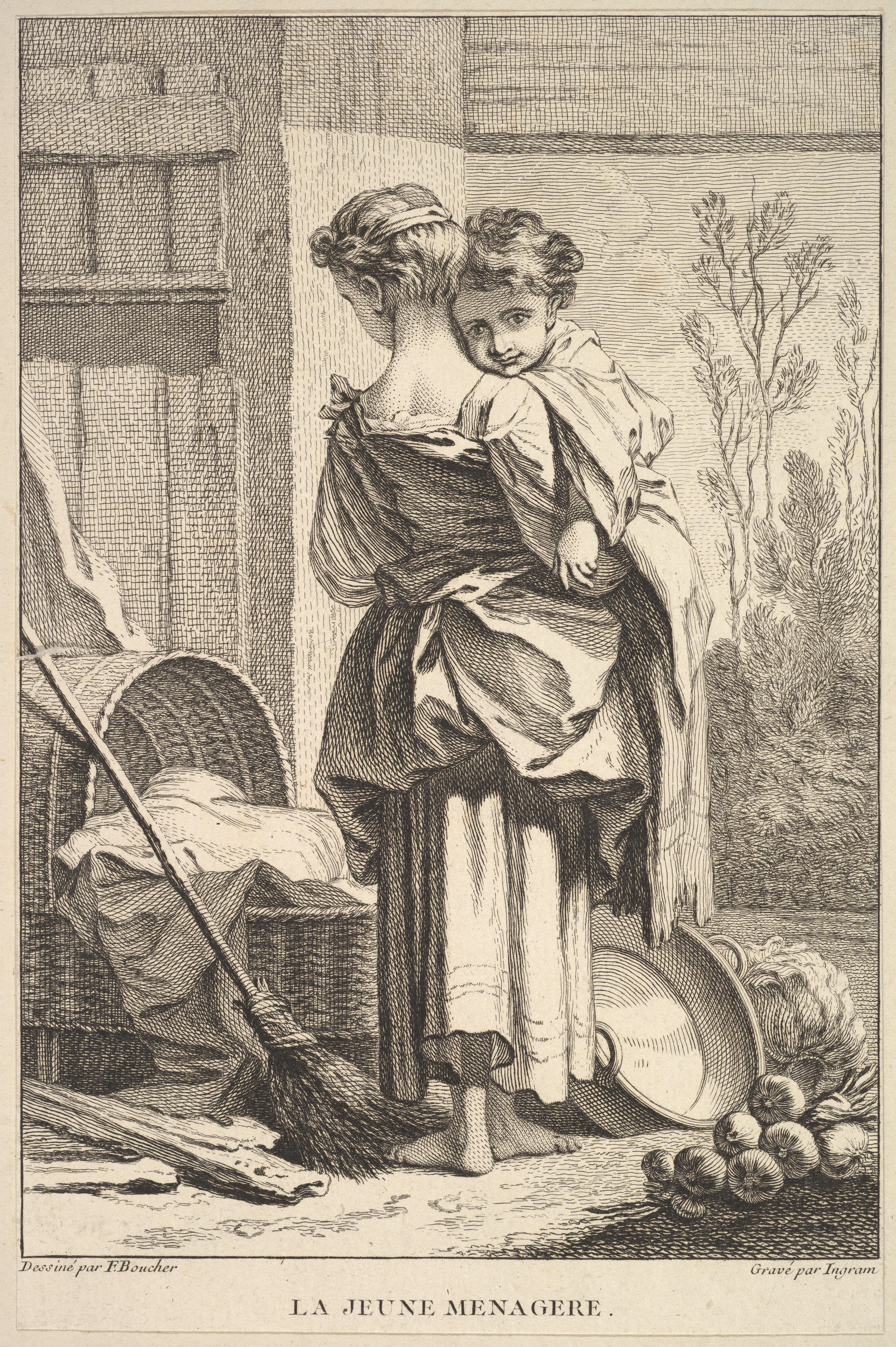
The Young Housekeeper

John Ingram (1721 – 1767 or later) was an English engraver. In his later career he lived in Paris.

== Life ==
Ingram was born in London in 1721, and first practised engraving there. In 1755 he went to Paris, and settled there for the rest of his life. He both etched and engraved. He engraved a number of plates after François Boucher (such as The Game of Chinese Chess), some after Charles-Nicolas Cochin, and a set of emblematical figures of the sciences in conjunction with Cochin and Jacques-Nicolas Tardieu. He was employed in engraving small plates for book illustration, and more especially on plates for the Transactions of the French Academy of Sciences.

He is thought to have been still active in 1767; his year of death is not known.
