= William Ingram (literature professor) =

American academic (born 1930)

William Ingram (born 1930) is an American academic who was Professor of Literature Emeritus at the University of Michigan. He is known for his work on early modern drama and performance.

== Life and career ==
Ingram was born in 1930. He earned the PhD at the University of Pennsylvania in 1966.

Ingram is the author of The Business of Playing: The Beginnings of the Adult Professional Theater and A London Life in the Brazen Age: Francis Langley 1548-1602, a biography of the Elizabethan playhouse owner Francis Langley.
