= Joan Ingram (broadcaster) =

Scottish broadcaster, journalist, media company director and author (born 1959)

Joan Ingram OBE
- Born: March 1959 (age 67)
- Education: University of Dundee
- Known for: Broadcaster and businesswoman
- Television: Crossfire and Scotland 500

Joan Ingram (born March 1959), OBE is a Scottish broadcaster, journalist, media company director and author.

== Education ==
Ingram attended Auchmuty High School in Glenrothes before studying at the University of Dundee, obtaining an MA Honours degree in politics and jurisprudence in 1981. She later studied at the University of Aberdeen where she obtained an MBA in 1996. In 2012 she completed an executive education programme at the Harvard Business School in Boston, MA.

== Career ==
Ingram began her broadcasting career in 1982 at Radio Tay. Within a year, she joined Grampian Television (now STV North) as a reporter and presenter for the BAFTA-winning nightly news programme North Tonight and various documentaries. Whilst at Grampian, Ingram also presented political and current affairs programming including Crossfire and Scottish Question Time. Ingram left the station in 1996 and continued to freelance as a television broadcaster until 1999, presenting STV's coverage of the new Scottish parliament.

In 1993, she co-founded Aberdeen-based change management, communications and media company, The Fifth Business. The company expanded its operations to Houston, London and The Hague. It was acquired by ERM in 2019.

In 2026, Ingram published her debut novel ‘Desire Path’.

== Volunteering ==
In 2007 Ingram joined NHS Grampian’s Patients’ Forum, eventually becoming its chair. She also served on the board of Aberdeen Sports Village for six years from 2009, becoming deputy chair. That same year, Ingram joined the NHS Scotland Diabetes Group representing the Juvenile Diabetes Research Foundation (JDRF).

In 2013 Ingram was invited by JDRF (now known as Breakthrough T1D) to join the 20-strong Type-1 Voices committee, based in New York. Breakthrough T1D funds medical research and manages $500m in charitable giving. She served in this capacity for three years.

In 2012 Ingram was appointed by the Secretary of State for Health and Social Care to the independent NHS Pay Review Body. The NHSPRB provides an impartial evidence-based process for determining public sector pay. She served two three-year terms.

== Awards ==
Ingram was a runner-up in the Association of Scottish Businesswomen's Outstanding Businesswoman of the Year Award 2000.

She was appointed an OBE in the New Year's Honours List of 2018 for her services in the field of healthcare.
