= David Bruce Ingram =

American philosopher (born 1952)

- Born: January 27, 1952 (age 74); Whittier, California
- Spouse: Jennifer Parks-Ingram
- Children: 3

Education
- Education: University of California, Irvine; University of California, San Diego

Philosophical work
- Era: 21st-century philosophy
- Region: Western philosophy
- School: Continental
- Institutions: Loyola University Chicago
- Main interests: Political philosophy; post-Kantian philosophy

David Bruce Ingram (born 1952) is an American philosopher and professor of philosophy at Loyola University Chicago. He is a recipient of Casa Guatemala's Human Rights Award (1999) and a recipient of the Alpha Sigma Nu Award for Best Book. Ingram is married to the philosopher Jennifer Parks; she is from Kingston, Ontario, Canada. He has three children, the oldest named Sabina Simon (b. 1991, from a previous marriage), Maxwell (b. 2003) and the youngest named Samuel (b. 2005).

== Books ==
- World Crisis and Underdevelopment: A Critical Theory of Poverty, Agency, and Coercion, Cambridge: Cambridge University Press, 2018.
- The Ethics of Development: Introduction, New York: Routledge, 2018.
- Habermas: Introduction and Analysis, Ithaca, NY: Cornell University Press, 2010
- The History of Continental Philosophy. Volume 5: Critical Theory to Structuralism: Philosophy, Politics, and the Human Sciences, New York: Routledge 2014.
- Group Rights: Reconciling Equality and Difference Lawrence, KS: University Press of Kansas, 2000
- Rights, Democracy, and Fulfillment in the Era of Identity Politics: Principled Compromises in a Compromised World Rowman and Littlefield, 2004.
- Reason, History and Politics: The Communitarian Grounds of Legitimation in the Modern Age Albany: State University of New York Press,
- Law: Key Concepts in Philosophy London: Continuum, London 2006.
- The Complete Idiot's Guide To Ethics Alpha Books, 2002.
- Habermas and the Dialectic of Reason New Haven Yale University Press, 1987. 263 pages.
- The Political: Readings In Continental Philosophy London: Blackwell, 2002.
- Critical Theory and Philosophy New York: Paragon House Publishers, 1990. 240 pages.
- Critical Theory: The Essential Readings New York: Paragon House Publishers, 1991. 388 pages.
