= Jack Ingram (ice hockey) =

Canadian ice hockey player

- Born: December 19, 1893; Halifax, Nova Scotia, Canada
- Died: December 14, 1957 (aged 63); Moncton, New Brunswick, Canada
- Height: 5 ft 11 in (180 cm)
- Weight: 170 lb (77 kg; 12 st 2 lb)
- Position: Centre
- Shot: Left
- Played for: Boston Bruins
- Playing career: 1912–1931

John Jasper Ingram (December 19, 1893 – December 14, 1957) was a Canadian professional ice hockey player. He played one game in the National Hockey League with the Boston Bruins on January 5, 1925 against the Toronto St. Pats. The rest of his career, which lasted from 1912 to 1931, was mainly spent in the Maritime senior leagues.

== Career ==
A native of Halifax, Nova Scotia, Ingram played the position of centre. Ingram played for the Charlottetown Islanders from 1912 to 1913, Moncton CNR Machinists from 1913 to 1915, Moncton St. Bernard's from 1915 to 1917, Moncton Trojans from 1915 to 1916, Moncton Victorias from 1918 to 1925. Boston Bruins in 1925, Providence Reds from 1926 to 1927, Moncton Atlantics from 1928 to 1930, and the Moncton Victorias from 1930 to 1931. Ingram retired from playing hockey in 1931, but continued to be a coach for both senior and junior hockey teams in New Brunswick.

== Personal life ==
Ingram died in Moncton, New Brunswick, in December 1957 at the age of 63.

== Career statistics ==
=== Regular season and playoffs ===
			Regular season					Playoffs
Season	Team	League	GP	G	A	Pts	PIM	GP	G	A	Pts	PIM
1912–13	Charlottetown Islanders	MMHL	—	—	—	—	—	—	—	—	—	—
1913–14	Moncton CNR Machinists	MCHL	7	15	0	15	—	1	2	0	2	—
1913–14	Halifax Socials	MPHL	1	0	0	0	0	—	—	—	—	—
1914–15	Moncton CNR Machinists	MCHL	4	4	0	4	—	—	—	—	—	—
1915–16	Moncton St. Bernard's	Exhib	1	2	0	2	—	—	—	—	—	—
1915–16	Moncton Trojans	Exhib	—	—	—	—	—	—	—	—	—	—
1916–17	Moncton St. Bernard's	Exhib	2	7	0	7	—	—	—	—	—	—
1918–19	Moncton Victorias	Exhib	1	3	0	3	—	—	—	—	—	—
1919–20	Moncton Victorias	ENBHL	6	8	3	11	4	9	23	4	27	4
1920–21	Moncton Victorias	MIAHL	9	18	0	18	6	2	4	0	4	2
1921–22	Moncton Victorias	MIAHL	13	24	0	24	36	—	—	—	—	—
1922–23	Moncton Victorias	MIAHL	12	18	0	18	39	—	—	—	—	—
1923–24	Moncton Victorias	MIAHL	16	12	0	12	19	—	—	—	—	—
1924–25	Moncton Victorias	MIAHL	3	7	0	7	2	—	—	—	—	—
1924–25	Boston Bruins	NHL	1	0	0	0	0	—	—	—	—	—
1926–27	Providence Reds	Can-Am	1	0	0	0	0	—	—	—	—	—
1928–29	Moncton Atlantics	SNBHL	12	7	3	10	16	2	1	0	1	2
1929–30	Moncton Atlantics	SNBHL	1	1	0	1	2	—	—	—	—	—
1930–31	Moncton Atlantics	SNBHL	2	0	0	0	2	—	—	—	—	—
NHL totals			1	0	0	0	0	—	—	—	—	—

== See also ==
- List of players who played only one game in the NHL

== Bibliography ==
- Diamond, Dan, ed. (2002), Total Hockey: The Official Encyclopedia of the National Hockey League, Second Edition, New York: Total Sports Publishing, ISBN 1-892129-85-X
- John Ingram Game Logs 1924–25, National Hockey League
