= David Ingram (explorer) =

16th-century English sailor and explorer

- Born: c. 1542; Barking, Essex
- Died: after 1583
- Other names: Davy Ingrams, Davyd Ingram
- Occupation: Sailor
- Employer(s): Sir John Hawkins (c. 1567); Sir Humphrey Gilbert (c. 1583)
- Known for: Claiming to have walked 3,300 miles from Mexico to Nova Scotia in the 16th Century.

David Ingram, Davy Ingrams, or Davyd Ingram (c. 1542 – after 1583) was a 16th-century English sailor and explorer who claimed to have walked across the interior of the North American continent from Mexico to Nova Scotia in 1568.

== Early life ==
The precise date or year of Ingram's birth are unknown. However, Sir Francis Walsingham noted in 1582 that Ingram was then "abowt the age of fortye yeares". He was born and grew up in Barking, Essex.

== Exploration ==
Ingram signed on with English privateer Sir John Hawkins in 1567 to raid and trade along the coasts of Portuguese Africa and Spanish Mexico. After a brief skirmish with the Spanish, around a hundred men from Hawkins' expedition were left at Tampico. Hawkins himself returned to Britain and he was expected to take two to three years to return for the men left behind. The men at Tampico faced immediate peril at the hands of the Spanish and Mexican Native Americans.

The sailors were aware that English fishing ships frequented Newfoundland. Ingram and a few others from his party decided to march northwards into the interior to reach Newfoundland, ignorant of the fact that Newfoundland was around 3,000 miles away from Tampico. After eleven months, only three men survived the walk - Ingram, Richard Browne, and Richard Twide. In October 1568, they spotted a French vessel lying at anchor in Nova Scotia. They managed to reach Le Havre with that vessel and then crossed the English Channel on a separate fishing vessel.

=== Walsingham's account ===
The only account of Ingram's travels was written down by Sir Francis Walsingham and Sir George Peckham in 1582, after Ingram narrated the account to him at the request of Sir Humphrey Gilbert. Browne and Twide had died in the interim and only Ingram could attest to their purported journey.

Ingram described North America as a fertile and pleasant land, reporting its vast plains and diverse forests. He claimed to have seen cities and towns, including Norumbega, a legendary city that featured on early European maps of the New World. He further reported the inhabitants as "canibals" with canine-like teeth. However, he added that the kings of the lands usually carried precious stones, pearls, silver, and gold, as well as that the ordinary people wore gold and silver bracelets and anklets. He claimed to have given a pearl to the captain of the French ship that transported him to Le Havre.

Ingram's descriptions are fanciful, perhaps derived from things he had seen or heard about in his travels near the coasts of West Africa and South America. For example, he claimed to have encountered elephants and white-headed birds that the locals called "penguins". He theorised that the word was of Welsh origin.

=== Veracity and treatment ===
The account written by Walsingham was published in 1589 in Richard Hakluyt's The Principall Navigations Voiages and Discoveries of the English Nation. However, the second edition of Hakluyt's Principall Navigations of 1599 did not contain Ingram's account, as Hakluyt himself doubted the veracity of Ingram's claim.

In 1625, Samuel Purchas, who continued Hakluyt's work, with his Hakluytus Posthumus, or Purchas his Pilgrimes, contested some of Ingram's claims. On the omission of Ingram's account from Hakluyt's second edition, Purchas commented that "It seemeth some incredibilities of his reports caused him to leave him out in the next impression, the reward of lying [being] not to be believed in truths.”

In 1999, British writer Richard Nathan attempted to see if the Ingram's journey was physically possible in only 11 months. On 18 August 1999, Nathan started walking from Guysborough, Nova Scotia and walked 3,300 miles for nine months to reach Barra del Torro, Tamaulipas on 14 May 2000.

In 2023, Dean Snow, archaeologist and head of the Anthropology Department at Penn State, published "The Extraordinary Journey of David Ingram: An Elizabethan Sailor in Native North America" in which he examined the original manuscripts of Ingram's interview and determined the confused version of his story that appeared in Hakluyt was the result of disorganization and poor editing. Snow reordered the testimony in chronological order and demonstrated that, once unscrambled, Ingram's testimony is plausible and that he should be reinstated as a trustworthy source.

== Later life ==
In 1583, Ingram returned to the New World with Sir Humphrey Gilbert, in Gilbert's unsuccessful attempt to establish an English settlement in Newfoundland.
