= Eysteinn Beli =

8th-century king of Sweden

Eysteinn Beli or Eysteinn hinn illráði, Swedish: Östen Illråde (ill-ruler) or Östen Beli, was a semi-legendary king of Sweden who would have ruled in the late 8th century.

== Krákumál ==
According to Krákumál (stanza 7), he fell at Ulleråker south of Uppsala.

Hjuggu vér með hjörvi. Hátt grenjuðu rottar, áðr en á Ullarakri Eysteinn konungr felli. Gengum gulli fáðir grundar vals af bröndum — rækyndill smaug rauðar rítr — at hjálma móti. Svíra virtr ór sárum sveif of hjarna kleifar.	We hewed with the sword. Swords roared loudly before King Eysteinn fell at Ullarakr. We proceeded to a meeting of helmets [BATTLE], decked with gold from the flames of the landing place of the falcon [ARM > GOLD RINGS]; the corpse-candle [SWORD] penetrated red shields. The wort of the neck [BLOOD] flowed from wounds over the cliffs of the brain [SHOULDERS].

== Ragnarssona þáttr ==
The apparently oldest version, Ragnarssona þáttr, relates that Ragnar Lodbrok's sons had left Sweden and conquered Zealand, Reidgotaland (here Jutland), Gotland, Öland and all the minor islands. Ivar the Boneless, the leader, then settled at Lejre with his brothers.

Ragnar was jealous with his sons' successes, and set Eysteinn as the jarl of Sweden, telling him to protect Sweden from his sons. He then went east across the Baltic Sea to pillage and to show his own skills.

Ragnar's sons Eric and Agnar then sailed into Lake Mälaren and sent a message to king Eysteinn that they wanted him to submit to Ragnar's sons, and Eric said that he wanted Eysteinn's daughter Borghild as wife. Eysteinn said that he first wanted to consult the Swedish chieftains. The chieftains said no to the offer, and ordered an attack on the rebellious sons. A battle ensued and Eric and Agnar were overwhelmed by the Swedish forces, whereupon Agnar died and Eric was taken prisoner.

Eysteinn offered Eric as much of Uppsala öd as he wanted, and Borghild, in wergild for Agnar. Eric proclaimed that after such a defeat he wanted nothing but to choose the day of his own death. Eric asked to be impaled on spears that raised him above the dead and his wish was granted.

In Zealand, his mother Aslaug and his brothers Björn Ironside and Hvitserk, who had been playing tafl, become upset and sail to Sweden with a large army. Aslaug, calling herself Randalin rides with cavalry across the land.

The battle ended with Eysteinn's death. When Ragnar died, Björn Ironside became the king of Sweden.

== Ragnar Lodbrok's saga ==
Ragnar Lodbrok's saga tells that Eysteinn was the king of Sweden and a good friend of Ragnar Lodbrok. Eysteinn had the most beautiful daughter named Ingeborg. He was also a devout pagan and there were so many blóts at Uppsala that no other place had ever been its equal. The Swedes worshiped a holy cow named Sibilja, and when the Swedes were attacked by enemies, they had the cow walk in front of the battle formation. The cow's magic was so great that when she began to bellow, the enemies began to fight between themselves.

When Ragnar Lodbrok was visiting Eysteinn at Uppsala, Eysteinn suggested that Ragnar marry Ingeborg and have her as wife instead of the pauper Aslaug (Kraka). Ragnar consequently betrothed himself to Ingeborg. Eventually, Aslaug found out from three small birds, and told Ragnar that she was no pauper. She was the daughter of Sigurd and Brynhild. As Ragnar understood that Kraka was of better descent than that of Ingeborg, he decided not to go back to Sweden and wed Eysteinn's daughter.

Eysteinn was upset with Ragnar's change of plans and declared that their friendship was no more. This was interesting news to Ragnar's sons Eric and Agnar who decided to go to Sweden and pillage, as their father would not mind anymore.

Eysteinn sent the fiery cross in all directions and assembled the Swedish leidang. They also made Sibilja join the army, but they had to blót considerably to make her obey. When they had arrived at the location where Eric and Agnar were camped, Eysteinn ordered one third of the Swedish army to attack Eric and Ragnar's men, while the others would attack from all directions after the battle had begun. This was done and Sibilja began to bellow. Eric and Agnar's warriors began to fight between themselves and eventually Agnar died and Eric was taken captive. Eric was offered both peace and Ingeborg but Eric wanted the Swedes to stick spears into the ground and throw him on top of them so that he would die.

When Aslaug heard the news of Eric and Agnar's death, she cried blood, and asked Ragnar's sons to avenge their dead brothers. Ivar the Boneless was afraid of the magic that ruled in Sweden, but when his little brother, the only three year old Sigurd Snake-in-the-Eye wanted to attack Eysteinn, the brothers changed their minds.

Sigurd's foster-father assembled five longships for him. Hvitserk and Björn Ironside mustered fourteen, while Aslaug and Ivar the Boneless marshalled ten ships each. Ivar would not allow his mother Aslaug to go by sea, but she could join the army of riders that would go across land. She accepted and changed her name to Randalin.

When the armies met in battle, Ivar told everyone to make such a din that the bellowing from Sibilja could not be heard. This was of no use, however, and so Ivar shot two arrows in each of Sibilja's eyes. However, the cow could not be stopped. Then Ivar asked his men to throw him on top of the cow. Ivar made himself so heavy as he landed on the cow, that she was crushed.

The Swedish leidang was beaten and Eysteinn fell. Ragnar's sons commanded that their brother had been avenged and that the Swedes should be spared pillaging.

== Hervarar saga ==
The Hervarar saga tells that Eysteinn Beli was the son of Harald Wartooth. Hervarar saga made Harald Wartooth the king of Sweden and Sigurd Hring the king of Denmark, while other sources have it the other way round. It tells that Eysteinn inherited Sweden from his father Harald Wartooth and ruled it until he was killed by the sons of Ragnar Lodbrok, as told in Ragnar Lodbrok's saga. When Ragnar died, Björn Ironside became the king of Sweden.

== Gesta Danorum ==
The Gesta Danorum (book 9) by Saxo Grammaticus also mentions Eysteinn, but only in passing. It says that Ragnar Lodbrok's son Agnar learnt that his brother Eric had been slain by Osten, the king of Sweden. He wished to avenge his brother but died in the battle.

== Skáldatal ==
Skáldatal says that Eysteinn Beli was the patron of many skalds, including Bragi inn gamli, Grundi prúði, Erpr lútandi, Kálfr þrænzki, Refr ryzki, Ormr oframi, two named Ölvaldi, Ávaldi, Fleinn skáld and Rögnvaldr skáld.

Legendary titles
Preceded by Ragnar Lodbrok	King of Sweden	Succeeded by Björn Ironside
