= Þóra borgarhjǫrtr =

Norse mythical character

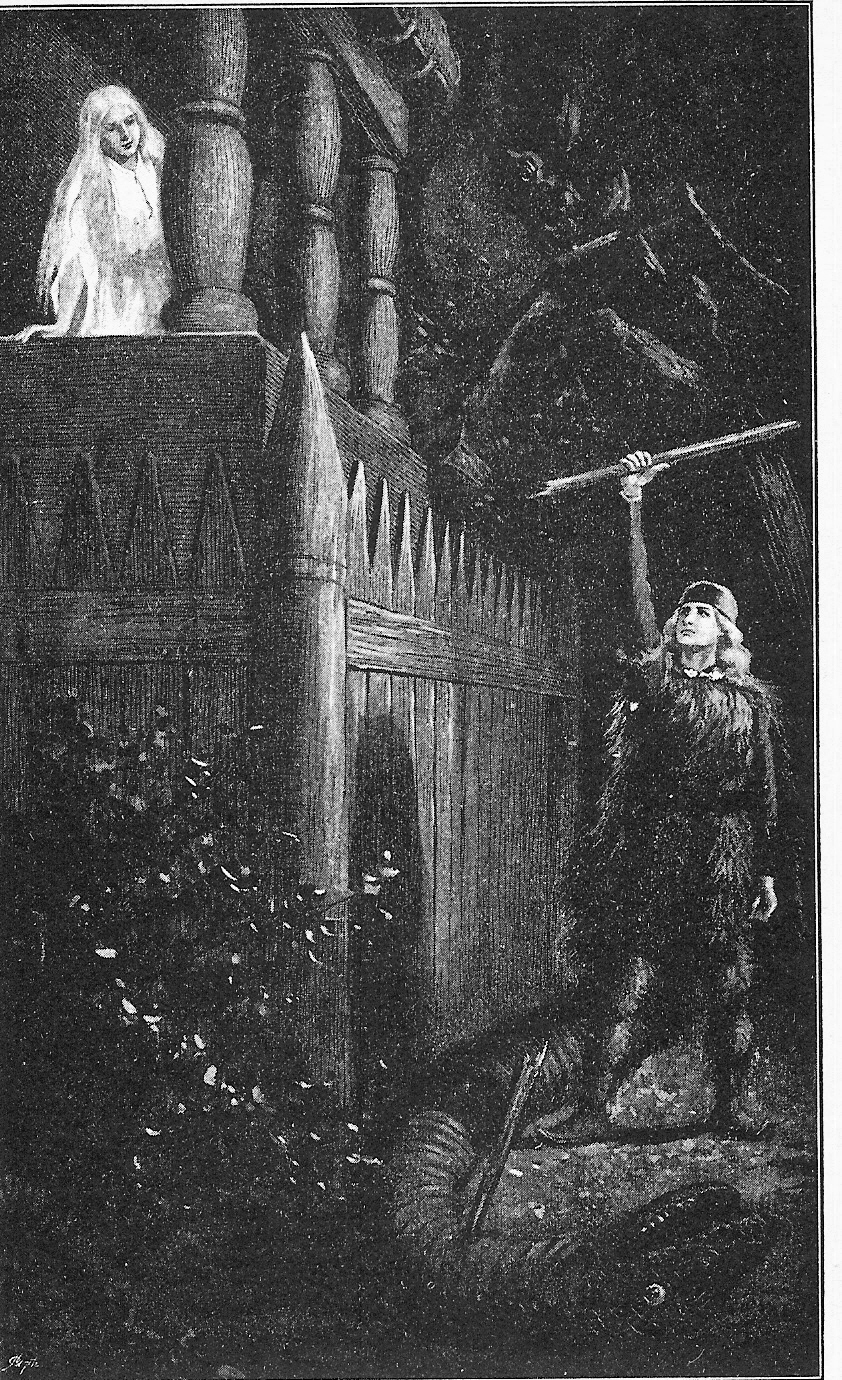
Thora Townhart, illustration by Jenny Nyström (1895)

Thora Borgarhjört (Old Norse: Þóra borgarhjǫrtr, which literally means "Thora Town-Hart"), is a mythical character in the Norse sagas – the wife of Ragnar Loðbrók, who kills a serpent to win her hand in marriage. Thora was the daughter of Herrauðr, the Earl of Götaland.

== Thora in the sagas ==
According to the sagas, Thora lived in a bower in Västergötland (West Götaland). Her father gave her a small lindworm that grew into a large serpent and encircled the bower. Her father promised Thora's hand in marriage to any man who could slay the serpent.

After divorcing his first wife, the shield-maiden Lagertha, Ragnar wanted to make Thora his wife. He went to the bower, wearing breeches that he had treated with tar and sand to protect his legs from the serpent's poison. It was from these that he gained the epithet Loðbrók (which literally means "Hairy-Britches"). Wielding a spear, Ragnar approached the serpent. It spat poison at him, but the poison could not penetrate Ragnar's shield or breeches. He stuck his spear through the serpent's heart and cut off its head. Thora and Ragnar were then married.

According to the Tale of Ragnar's Sons (Ragnarssona þáttr), Thora and Ragnar had two sons, Eiríkr and Agnar.

Thora died of an illness, while Eiríkr and Agnar died in or following a battle with Eysteinn Beli, an Earl of Sweden appointed by Ragnar.

Ragnar later married Aslaug (Aslög), the daughter of Sigurd and Brynhildr.

== Sources ==
The story appears in Krákumál, the Tale of Ragnar Lodbrok's sons, Tale of Ragnar Lodbrok, Gesta Danorum and Bósa saga ok Herrauds. According to the last saga, the lindworm was hatched from an egg that Herrauðr had taken in Bjarmland.

== See also ==
- Dragonslayers

== Other sources ==
- McTurk, Rory Studies in Ragnars saga loðbrókar and its Major Scandinavian Analogues (Oxford: The Society for the Study of Mediæval Languages and Literature, 1991) ISBN 978-0-907570-08-0
