= Battle of York (867) =

867 battle between Vikings and Northumbria

- Part of the Viking invasions of England
| Date | 21 March 867 |
| Location | York 53°57′30″N 1°4′49″W |
| Result | Viking victory |

Belligerents
| Great Heathen Army | Kingdom of Northumbria |

Commanders and leaders
| Ivar (possibly Ímar); Ubba | Ælla of Northumbria †; Osberht of Northumbria † |
- Location within North Yorkshire

The Battle of York was fought between the Vikings of the Great Heathen Army and the Anglo-Saxon Kingdom of Northumbria on 21 March 867 in the city of York.

Formerly controlled by the Roman Empire, York had been taken over by the Anglo-Saxons and had become the capital of the Kingdom of Northumbria. In 866 this kingdom was in the middle of a civil war, with Ælla and Osberht both claiming the crown. The Vikings, who had arrived on the eastern shores of the British Isles led by Ubba and Ivar, were able to take the city.

In the spring of 867 Ælla and Osberht united to try to push the Vikings out of York. Despite the Northumbrians making it inside the walls, the battle ended without success, and with the deaths of both Ælla and Osberht.

Following their victory the Vikings would initially set up a puppet king named Ecgberht, before later creating the Kingdom of Jórvík centred on York.

== Background ==
=== York ===
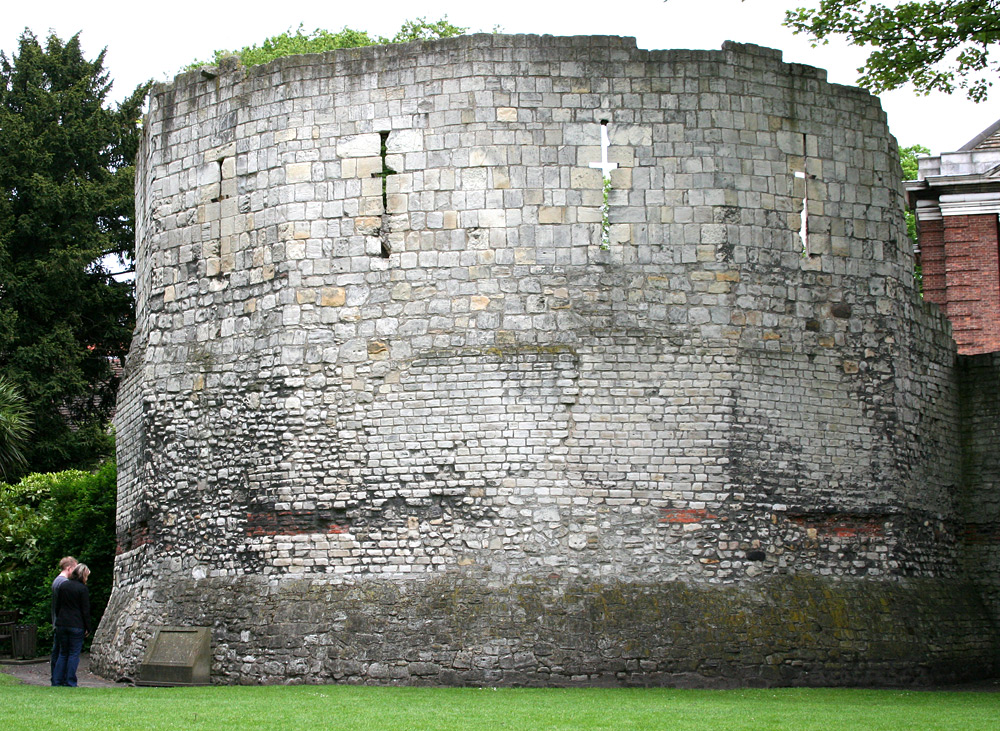
The Multangular tower, part of the York's Roman wall

Known as Eoferwic, York was taken over by the Anglo-Saxons after the Romans left in the 5th century. The city became the capital of the Kingdom of Northumbria, serving the needs of both the king and the Archbishop of York. The ancient Roman walls still stood, but by 867 they were crumbling and in disrepair, proving to be little defence for the Northumbrians against the attacking Vikings.

=== Viking invasion ===
There had been Viking raids against Britain since the 8th century, but it was not until the 860s that Viking armies were formed with the intention of conquering lands. In 865 the Great Heathen Army landed in East Anglia and started the invasion that would lead to the creation of the Danelaw.

Led by Ubba and Ivar (who may be the same historical figure as Ímar) the Vikings first took York on 1 November 866. Ivar's apparent motive was to avenge the death of his father, Ragnar Lodbrok. The Kingdom of Northumbria was in the middle of a civil war after Ælla had driven out the previous king Osberht by force. The Vikings had little trouble taking York, but failed to capture Ælla.

== Battle ==
In the spring of 867 Ælla and Osberht put aside their differences and united in an attempt to push the invaders out of Northumbria, leading to the battle of York on the 21 March. The battle started well for the Northumbrian forces, who broke through the city's defences. But then the experience of the Viking warriors showed through, as the narrow streets nullified any advantage of numbers the Northumbrians may have had.. The battle ended with a defeat of the Northumbrian army, and the death of both Ælla and Osberht. A somewhat different account stated that the Vikings were caught under the walls of York, between their attackers and York's Northumbrian garrison. However, the Danes rallied and the battle turned against the Northumbrians and resulted in the killing of both of their kings.

Norse tradition holds that the victorious Ivar and Ubba were brothers and that they captured Ælla and subsequently blood eagled him. In contrast, the Anglo-Saxon Chronicle simply states "both kings were slain on the spot". The Irish Annals of Ulster state that "The dark foreigners won a battle over the northern Saxons at York, in which fell Aelle, king of the northern Saxons;" the Latin cecidit, 'he fell', generally indicates death in battle, rather that execution.

== Aftermath ==
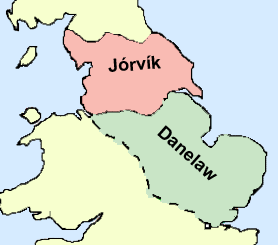
Kingdom of Jorvik, shown next to Danelaw

In York, Viking leaders established a puppet king named Ecgberht, who remained until 872, when a revolt drove him into exile in Mercia. Halfdan Ragnarsson of the Vikings ended the revolt in 876 and directly occupied York and the rest of Deira (south-east Northumbria), partitioning it among his followers. In time, this led to the creation of the Kingdom of Jórvík, which existed under Viking control until 910, when it was taken by the Anglo-Saxons. The kingdom was reoccupied by the Vikings on several occasions until 954, from when it was subjected to the rule of Wessex. No future attempt was made to re-establish the Kingdom of Northumbria.

Before the area was integrated into Wessex, the surviving Anglo-Saxon lords ruled Northumberland north of the river Tees from Bamburgh.

== In popular culture ==
A fictionalized version of the battle is depicted in the TV series Vikings. In the Season 4 episode titled "Revenge", the Great Heathen Army clashes with Ælla's forces, whom they greatly outnumber, led by Ivar in tandem with Björn, son of Ragnar Lothbrok. The attack comes as retaliation for Ragnar's execution at the hands of Ælla.

== Sources ==
- Arnold-Baker, Charles (2001). "Northumbria, Anglian Kingdom". The Companion to British History, Routledge (2nd ed.). London, UK: Routledge. ISBN 0415185831.
- Bessell, Craig (10 October 2018). "3 Key Battles of the Viking Invasions of England". History Hit.
- Cannon, John (2015). "Ælle". A Dictionary of British History. Oxford University Press. doi:10.1093/acref/9780199550371.001.0001. ISBN 9780199550371.
- City of York Council (21 December 2006). "Eoferwic: Anglo-Saxon York". City of York Council - York's History. Archived from the original on 4 February 2008.
- Eggenberger, David (1985). An Encyclopedia of Battles. New York, N.Y.: Dover Publications Inc. ISBN 0-486-24913-1.
- Johnson, Ben. "Invaders! Angles, Saxons and Vikings". Historic UK.
- Edward, James (29 March 2011). "Overview: The Vikings, 800 to 1066". BBC - History.
- Frank, Roberta (1984). "Viking atrocity and Skaldic verse: The Rite of the Blood-Eagle". English Heritage Review. Longman Group Limited London: 332–343.
- Hall, Richard. "The Viking Capture of York" (PDF). Jorvik Viking Centre. Archived from the original (PDF) on 25 September 2020.
- Loyn, Henry (2015). "Northumbria, kingdom of". In Crowcroft, Robert; Cannon, John (eds.). The Oxford Companion to British History. Oxford University Press. doi:10.1093/acref/9780199677832.001.0001. ISBN 9780199677832.
- Market House Books (2002). "York, Kingdom of". Dictionary of British History (1st ed.). Aylesbury, Bucks, UK: Market House Books Ltd. ISBN 9780007128068.
- Project Gutenberg (1 September 1996). "The Anglo-Saxon Chronicle". The Project Gutenberg eBook of The Anglo-Saxon Chronicle. Translated by J. A. Giles; J. Ingram. Project Gutenberg. [eBook #657].
- Sawyer, Peter (2001). The Oxford Illustrated History of the Vikings. Oxford University Press. ISBN 978-0-19-285434-6.
- Whitelock, Dorothy. "Fact and Fiction in the legend of St. Edmund". wmich.edu. pp. 225–227. Archived from the original on 4 September 2006.
- York History (2007). "York history timeline". YorkHistory.com. Archived from the original on 14 March 2007.
