= The Strongbow Saga =

Historical fiction series

The Strongbow Saga is a historical fiction series by Judson Roberts. The author claims to be a descendant of Rollo (also known as Rolf or Hrolf), a Viking who, in 911 AD signed a treaty and received grants to the land which became Normandy.

The first three volumes of The Strongbow Saga were originally published between 2006 and 2008 as young adult fiction by HarperCollins. The series was republished as general historical fiction, beginning in 2010, by Northman Books.

== Synopsis ==
The Saga tells the story of Halfdan Hroriksson, a young Viking trying to avenge his brother's murder. The series weaves the story of the fictional Halfdan into the lives of actual historical figures of the period, including famous Viking leaders Ragnar Lodbrok, Ivar the Boneless, Bjorn Ironside, and Hastein, as well as Frankish leaders King Charles the Bald and Count Robert the Strong. Actual historical events form a backdrop for parts of the story, including a Danish attack up the Seine River in the year 845 which was reported in several contemporary Frankish sources, including the Annals of St. Bertin.

The series begins in Denmark around the year 845, but over the course of its projected 6 volumes the story's settings traverse much of the Viking world, including western Frankia in books two and three, Denmark and Sweden in book four, and Russia and Ireland in books five and six. The first four books are, Viking Warrior, Dragons from the Sea, The Road to Vengeance, and The Long Hunt. As of May 2018 Roberts has not revealed any kind of timeline for the release of the last two books, citing delays caused by a lack of historical data and health problems.

== Viking Warrior ==
=== Plot ===
At the beginning of the novel, the reader is introduced to Halfdan, who is cutting wood and squaring timber. Halfdan is a slave, despite being the son of an Irish princess, and a great chieftain. Derdriu (his mother) arrives to watch her son work and to look out at the bay near their estate. Not too soon, Gunhild arrives to send Derdriu back to her chores, for she is a slave, too. As soon as she has finished speaking, a longship enters the bay, carrying Hrorik, who has been in England raiding. The reader soon discovers that their raid has been met with failure, and many died or are wounded. Harald is unharmed, but Hrorik is on the verge of death. Quickly, Harald recounts the lengthy story of their raid, and how Hrorik was injured. Soon after, he, Sigrid, Derdriu, and Halfdan gather around Hrorik as he is dying. With one of his final breaths, he asks Derdriu to accompany him to Valhalla (the hall of warriors) which is an honor in the society described. To do this, she must die with him. She agrees, only if Halfdan is freed from enslavement, and is acknowledged as Hrorik's son. Hrorik agrees, and soon he is dead.

Hrorik and Derdriu are laid in the death ship, upon which dead warriors are sent off to Valhalla, and burned to ash. That night, Harald is made the chieftain of the estate, and Halfdan is officially freed, so he dines with the carls of the household, like a normal free man. He wakes up the following morning, hungover from the previous night's festivities, and Harald begins Hafldan's training into becoming a warrior. He discovers quickly that Halfdan has a knack for fighting, and begins training with him day and night for months. The two of them go hunting one day, since Halfdan has a great talent with the bow, and Halfdan makes an amazing shot, showing off his skill. That night, Sigrid and Gunhild prepare a feast. Their feast is interrupted though.

Toke arrives, after hearing of Hrorik's death. Toke comes to claim his inheritance (he has received none) and the reader infers that Toke is a disturbed, a war-crazed man. The reader learns of Toke's backstory: it is this attitude of rage that led Hrorik to kick Toke out of the estate where he had been living. While Gunhild informs Toke that he received no inheritance, Harald reveals to Halfdan that Hrorik left him an estate called Limfjord, which Hrorik used to rule. Toke is furious that a former slave gets an estate while he himself gets nothing, and demands that they give him something in return. Harald denies Toke, but lets him stay for the night and enjoy in their feast. During the feast, a fight almost breaks out, but Harald quells it, and ejects Toke, like Hrorik had done long ago. Toke leaves the following morning, and soon Halfdan and Harald, among other carls, set out for Limfjord, the newly-inherited estate.

While at Limfjord, Halfdan meets Abbot Aidan, who used to be one of his mother's friends. Soon after arriving, a band of raiders attack their estate. They are trapped inside the longhouse and attempt to get the slaves, women, and children out. The leader of the raiders seems to heed this request, but as soon as they leave the house, he has them killed. Harald and Halfdan decide that they need to escape, so they hide in between two oxen and leave. Their escape doesn't last long, however, because the raiders kill the oxen, and leave Halfdan, Harald, and the other carls exposed. In the following battle, Halfdan manages to escape without injury, at the cost of Harald's death. Halfdan escapes to a forest, where he is being hunted by raiders. At this point he learns that the raiders were Toke and his crew. He manages to stay one step ahead of Toke's men, and swears an oath to kill every man of Toke's crew. He kills the two men following him, and heads to the town Hedeby where he begins his journey of revenge.

=== Characters ===
- Halfdan, a fourteen-year-old slave, lives on his father's estate working beside his mother in the household. Unlike his mother, he also works outside of the home, chopping wood and squaring timber. His father, Hrorik, is the owner of the estate, but Halfdan cannot inherit it since he was born to his mother a slave. Hrorik, on his deathbed, frees Halfdan, who discovers he has been left an estate.
- Harald, Halfdan's half-brother, and the greatest warrior on the estate, is Hrorik's son from a different wife. He is a few years older than Halfdan. Derdriu was his step-mother, and Hrorik was his father, so he and Halfdan are direct brothers, even though they did not share the same birth-mother.
- Derdriu, the mother of Halfdan, and an Irish princess made slave, dies with Hrorik and accompanies him to Valhalla, the hall of the warriors. Derdriu is a thrall on Hrorik's estate; Hrorik is in love with her even though he is married and often moves to her bed in the night. For this, Gunhild hates Derdriu, and makes her life as a slave miserable.
- Hrorik, a chieftain and warrior loved and feared by his subjects, dies early in the book. He is Harald, Sigrid, and Halfdan's father. He is married to Gunhild, and still involves himself in a sexual relationship with Derdriu, which is how Halfdan was conceived. He leads a raid in England early in the book and is badly injured. When he returns to his estate, he dies and is burned in his “death ship.” Despite being Halfdan's master, he sometimes acts much like an actual father and even leaves him Hrorik's old estate, the Limfjord.
- Gunhild, who Halfdan thinks is a very annoying and rude lady, is Hrorik's wife. She is an aggressive woman, skilled in making people dislike her. Even her son Toke is often angered with her behavior. She is viewed as inconsiderate, rude, and self-serving.
- Toke, the antagonist of the story, is Gunhild's son from her first husband. Toke is known as a Berserk, someone who is very warlike and can't wait to kill something, and has a very “dark mind” according to Harald. He returns to Hrorik's estate, after being kicked out ten years earlier, after Hrorik is dead, so he may claim his inheritance. Hrorik left him no inheritance, however, and Toke feels very angry about that, and even curses Hrorik's name. When Harald, Halfdan, and some carls go to the Limfjord (Halfdan's estate that Hrorik left him) Toke is not far behind, and attacks them. With his “dark mind” he finds pleasure in killing all the women, children, and slaves after having promised them safe voyage from the estate, and ends up killing Harald, his own half-brother. Toke then lies to the other people in nearby villages and says that Halfdan did all the things he himself did.

== Reception ==
Kliatt complimented Viking Warrior as being "filled with enough war and suspense, emotion, Viking savagery and honor to keep the reader motivated."
