= Herrauðr =

Figure in Norse legend

Herrauðr, Herraud, Herröðr, Herruðr, Herrud, Herothus or Heroth is a legendary earl of Götaland or king of Sweden, who appears in several medieval legends, in particular those relating to Ragnar Lodbrok (e.g. Tale of Ragnar's Sons, Tale of Ragnar Lodbrok, Krákumál and Gesta Danorum, book 9). He also has a saga of his own in Bósi and Herrauðr's saga.

His main role in the sagas is as the father of Þóra Borgarhjǫrtr who gave his daughter one or two small lindworms which grew so big that he had to promise her to the man who could slay the serpent(s). Ragnar Lodbrok took on himself to liberate the girl and became her husband. Bósi and Herrauðr's saga works as a prequel describing the origin of the lindworm.

In Krákumál, the dying Ragnar Lodbrok sings that a more famous earl than Herröðr had never steered his longship into a harbour .

== Bósi and Herrauðr's saga ==
Bósi and Herrauðr's saga tells that Herrauðr was the son of king Ring of Östergötland and the nephew of Gautrekr, the king of Västergötland. Herrauðr's grandfather was Gauti, a son of Odin.

Herrauðr's father Ring preferred his illegitimate son Sjóðr to Herrauðr. When Herrauðr's best friend Bósi was outlawed, the two friends set off to spend some years pillaging as Vikings. Back in Östergötland, Sjóðr forced Bósi's father to pay money in compensation for Bósi's crime, so when Sjóðr and Bósi met in Wendland the two started fighting and Sjóðr was killed. When the two friends returned to Östergötland, Ring refused to reconcile with Herrauðr and instead he incarcerated Herrauðr and Bósi and intended to execute them.

Through magic and threats, Busla, Bósi's foster-mother, prevailed on Ring to send the two young men on a dangerous quest instead of executing them. They were to find a vulture's egg inscribed with golden letters.

The two young men went to Bjarmaland and killed the vulture guarding the temple of Jumala and the priestess Kolfrosta. They also saved the priestess-to-be, Hleið, the sister of Guðmundr of Glæsisvellir. Hleið was happy to be saved and became Herrauðr's wife. Back in Östergötland, Ring accepted the egg and reconciled with his son and Bósi. Herrauðr and Bósi then departed for the Battle of Brávellir to fight for Harald Wartooth and survived the immense battle.

Gudmund of Glæsisvellir who wanted to find his sister promised her to Siggeir, the son of Harekr the king of Bjarmaland, if he could find her. The Bjarmians invaded Östergötland, killed king Ring and took Hleið back to Bjarmaland.

When Herrauðr and Bósi returned from the Brávellir, they set off to find Hleið together with Bósi's foster-mother Busla and his brother Smiðr. They rescued Hleið and kidnapped Edda, the king's daughter. King Harek died trying to stop them.

Herrauðr became the new king of Östergötland, while Bósi ascended the throne of Bjarmaland together with his queen Edda. Herrauðr and his queen Hleið had a daughter, Þóra Borgarhjǫrtr. When the vulture's egg hatched, there was a lindworm inside and it soon encircled Þóra Borgarhjǫrtr's bower. Herrauðr promised his daughter to the man who could slay the serpent and it was Ragnar Lodbrok who liberated her.

== Tale of Ragnar's sons ==
In the tale of Tale of Ragnar's sons, Herrauðr is the earl of Götaland and one of Ragnar Lodbrok's vassals (this fits Bósi and Herrauðr's saga as Sigurd Hring who was victorious at the Battle of Brávellir had died and was succeeded by his son Ragnar).

Herrauðr's daughter Þóra Borgarhjǫrtr was very beautiful. He had given her a lindworm, but after some time, it had encircled her bower and threatened anyone who approached it, except for her servants who fed it with an ox every day. At his symbel, Herrauðr promised his daughter to the man who could kill the serpent.

When Ragnar heard of this, he went to Västergötland and dressed himself in shaggy clothes that he had treated with tar and sand. He took a spear and approached the serpent which blew poison at him. Ragnar protected himself with his shield and his clothes and stuck the spear through its heart. He then cut off the serpent's head, and when the people found out what had happened, he married Þora.

== Gesta Danorum ==
In Gesta Danorum, book 9, Herodd is the king of Sweden. One day when he hunted in the woods, he found some adders that he gave to his daughter Tora. She raised the snakes with whole oxen until they had grown so large that they terrorized the entire country side. Horrified, Herrod promised his daughter to anyone who could kill the serpents.

Ragnar Lodbrok donned some furry clothes to protect himself and went to Sweden. There he threw himself in cold water and let the frost make the water into an icy protection of his clothes. At the palace, he met two large snakes who attacked him. Shielded by his clothes he managed to kill them by piercing their hearts with a spear.

== See Also ==
Herod the Great, King of Judea. He ruled the Herodian Kingdom until it split into the Herodian Tetrarchy after his death

Herodotus, Ancient Greek Historian
