= Tale of Ragnar's Sons =

Old Norse folk tale

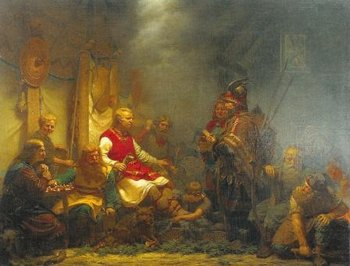
An 1857 painting by August Malmström depicting King Ælla's messenger before Ragnar Lodbrok's sons.

The Tale of Ragnar's sons (Old Norse: Ragnarssona þáttr) is an Old Norse story about Ragnar Lodbrok and his sons, written around 1300.

== Summary ==
=== Ragnar Lodbrok ===
When Sigurd Ring dies, Ragnar Lodbrok succeeds him as the king of Sweden and Denmark. Many foreign kings come to take parts of his kingdom as they think Ragnar is too young to defend it.

Herrauðr, the earl of Götaland and one of Ragnar's vassals had a daughter, Þóra Borgarhjǫrtr, who was very beautiful. He gave her a lindworm, but after some time, it encircles her tower and threatens anyone who approaches it, except for her servants who fed it an ox every day. At his symbel, Herrauðr promises his daughter to the man who kills the serpent.

When Ragnar hears of this, he goes to Västergötland and dresses in shaggy clothes that he had treated with tar and sand. He took a spear and approached the serpent, which then blew poison at him. Ragnar protected himself with his shield and speared the serpent through its heart. He then cut off the serpent's head, and when the people found out what had happened, he married Thora. Then, he proceeded to liberate his kingdom.

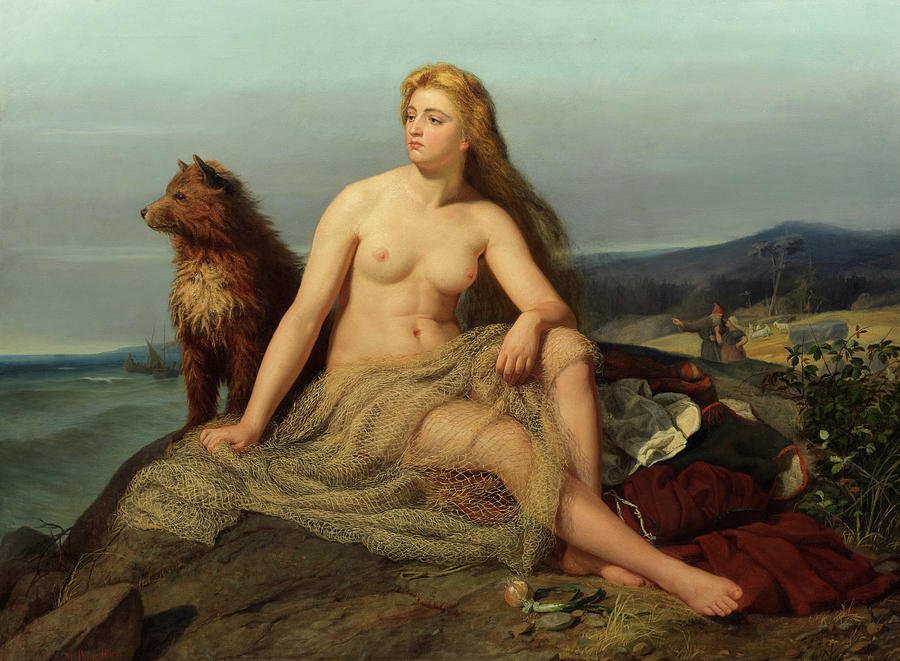
Kraka (Aslaug) by Mårten Eskil Winge

Ragnar and Thora had two sons, Eric and Agnar, before Thora fell ill and died when the sons were only a few years old. Ragnar then married Aslaug, also known as Randalin, the daughter of Sigurd and Brynhildr. They had four sons, Ivar the Boneless, Ubba, Hvitserk and Sigurd Snake-in-the-Eye (thus called because there was a mark in his eye, as if a snake lay around the pupil).

=== The death of Eric and Agnar ===
Ragnar's sons grow up and in order to show themselves the equals of their father, they war far and wide. They conquer Zealand, Reidgotaland (here Jutland), Gotland, Öland and all the small islands. Ivar, the eldest and cleverest, is their leader and he installs himself at Lejre.

As Ragnar does not want his sons to overshadow him, he appoints Eysteinn Beli as the king of Sweden and tells him to protect it from his sons. One summer when Ragnar is pillaging in the Baltic region, his sons Eric and Agnar came into the lake Mälaren. They send a messenger to Gamla Uppsala asking Eysteinn to meet them. They then demand that Eysteinn be their vassal and that he give his daughter Borghild as wife to Eric. Eysteinn consults the Swedish chieftains and they decide to attack Eric and Agnar. After a long battle against overwhelming numbers, Eric is captured and Agnar was slain.

Eysteinn wants peace and offers his daughter to Eric and as much of Uppsala öd (the network of royal estates that financed the Swedish monarchy) as he wanted. Eric declares that after such a defeat he does not wish to live and asks to be raised on spearpoints above the slain so that he will be pierced and killed. His wish is granted.

When Aslaug and her sons hear the news in Zealand, they decide to avenge the dead brothers. Aslaug calls herself Randalin and rides with 1500 warriors across land, while her sons go in ships. After a long battle, Eysteinn dies and Eric and Agnar were avenged.

Ragnar is not happy that his sons have taken revenge without his help, and decides to conquer England with only two knarrs, in order to show himself a better warrior than his sons. The ships are built in Vestfold as his kingdom reached Dovre and Lindesnes, and they are enormous ships. Aslaug does not approve of the idea as the English coast was not fit for such ships, only for longships, but Ragnar does not listen to her advice.

Ragnar arrives safely with his army in England and begins to ravage and burn.

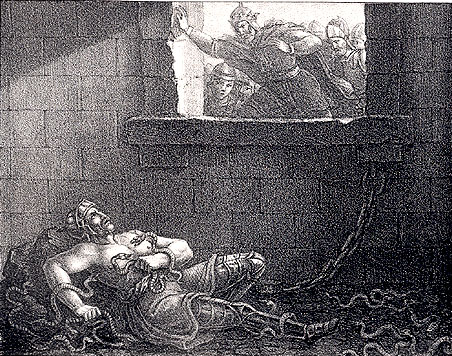
Ælla murdering Ragnar Lodbrok

=== The death of Ragnar and his sons' vengeance ===
When king Ælla of Northumbria learns of the pillaging army, he musters an overwhelming force and defeats Ragnar's army. Ragnar is dressed in a silken jacket which Aslaug had made and nothing can pierce it. Finally, he is taken prisoner and thrown into a snake pit. However, as the snakes could not bite him, the Englishmen take off his clothes and then the snakes kill him.

Ragnar's sons attack England but Ivar does not want to fight as the English army is too large; he fears they will lose and will have to go home again. Ivar, however, stays in England and asks Ælla for weregild, claiming that he can not go home without some compensation to show his brothers. Ivar only asks for as much land as he can cover with an ox's hide. He cuts it into such a fine long string of hide that he can encircle an area so large that he is able to capture the already existing fortress of York which was the capital of Northumbria, When this is done, he allies himself with all of England and finally all the chieftains in the region become loyal to Ivar and his brothers.

Then, Ivar tells his brothers to attack England. During the battle, Ivar sides with his brothers and so do many of the English chieftains with their people, out of loyalty to Ivar. Ælla is taken captive and in revenge, Ragnar's sons carve the blood eagle on him.

Ivar becomes king over north-eastern England which his forefathers had owned (i.e. Ivar Vidfamne and Sigurd Ring), and he has two sons, Yngvar and Husto. They obey their father Ivar and torture king Edmund the Martyr and take his realm.

Ragnar's sons pillage in England, Wales, France and Italy, until they come to the town of Luna in Italy. When they come back to Scandinavia, they divide the kingdoms so that Björn Ironside has Uppsala and Sweden, Sigurd Snake-in-the-Eye has Zealand, Scania, Halland, Viken, Agder, all the way to Lindesnes and most of Oppland, and Hvitserk receives Reidgotaland (Jutland) and Wendland.

Sigurd Snake-in-the-Eye marries king Ælla's daughter Blaeja and they have a son named Harthacnut, who succeeds his father as the king of Zealand, Scania and Halland, but Viken rebels and breaks loose. Harthacanute has a son named Gorm, who is big and strong but not as wise as his ancestors.

Sigurd's great-granddaughter marries the Hedmark king Halfdan the Black and the saga concludes with saying that their son eventually became the first king of Norway: Harald Fairhair.

== See also ==
- Great Heathen Army

== Sources ==
- Waggoner, Ben (2009), The Sagas of Ragnar Lodbrok, The Troth, ISBN 978-0-578-02138-6
