= Lagertha =

Legendary Viking shieldmaiden and ruler

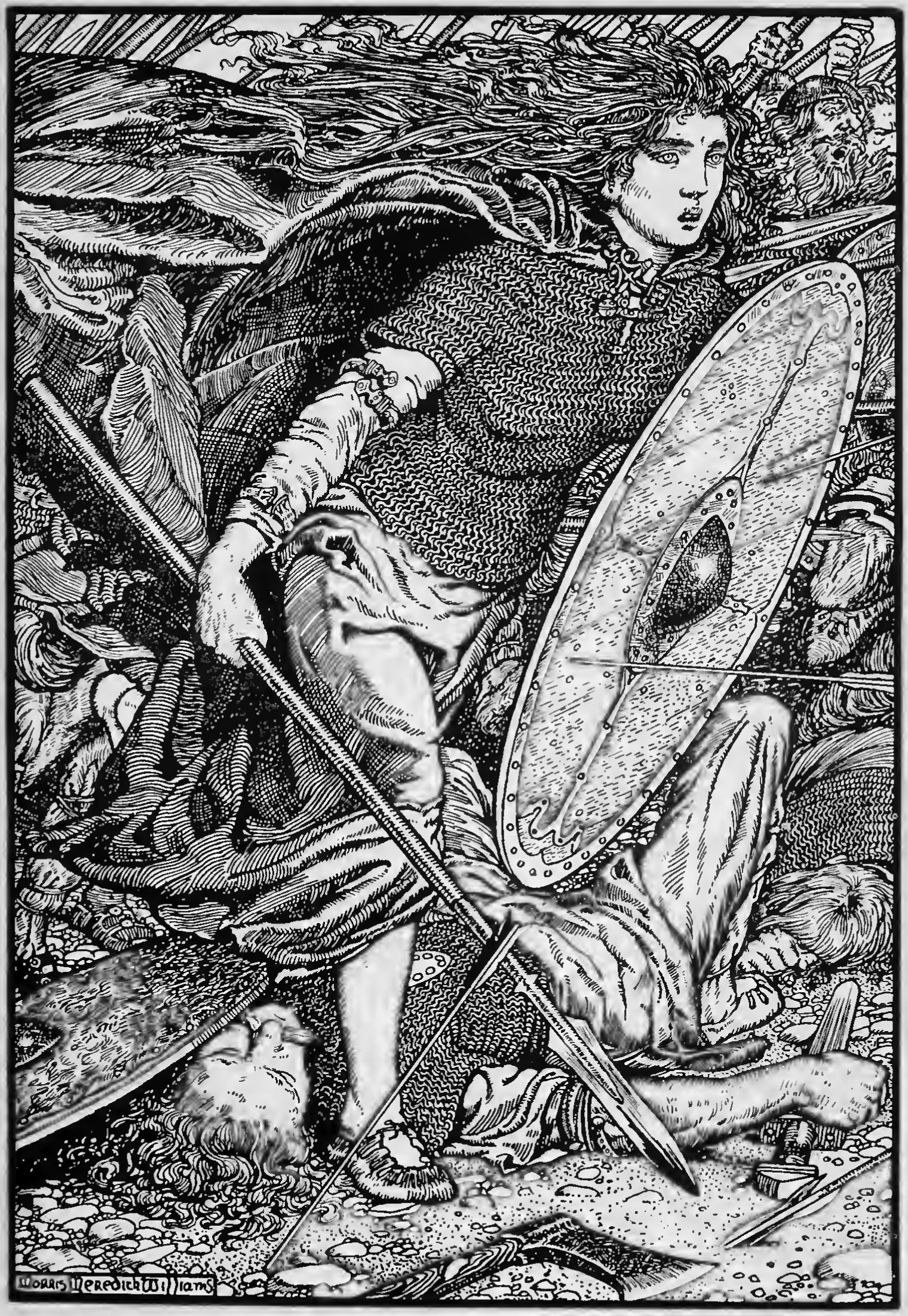
Lagertha as imagined in a lithography by Morris Meredith Williams in 1913

Lagertha, according to legend, was a Viking ruler and shield-maiden from what is now Norway, and the onetime wife of the famous Viking Ragnar Lodbrok. Her tale was recorded by the chronicler Saxo in the 12th century. According to the historian Judith Jesch, Saxo's tales about warrior women are largely fictional; other historians wrote that they may have a basis in tales about the Norse deity Thorgerd.

Her name as recorded by Saxo is Lathgertha. It has also been recorded as Lagertha, Ladgertha, Ladgerda or similar.

== Life according to Saxo Grammaticus ==
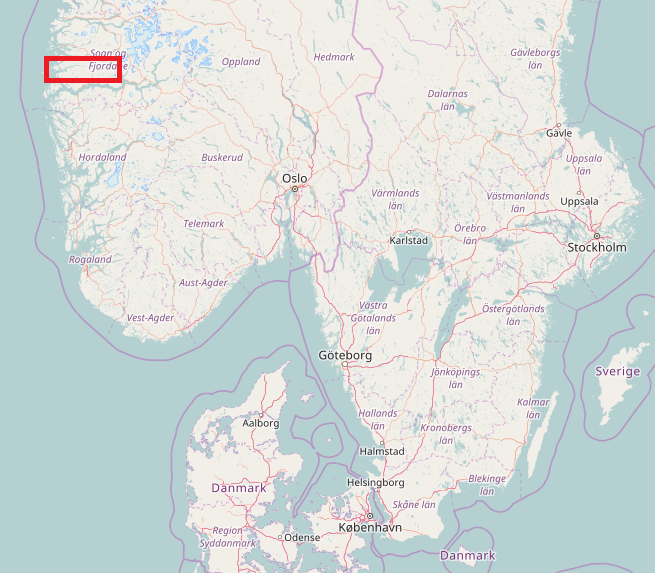
According to Saxo, Lagertha lived in the Gaula valley in western Norway, marked on this map.

Lagertha's tale is recorded in passages in the ninth book of the Gesta Danorum, a twelfth-century work of Danish history by the Christian historian Saxo Grammaticus. According to the Gesta (¶ 9.4.1–9.4.11), Lagertha's career as a warrior began when Frø, king of Sweden, invaded Norway and killed the Norwegian king Siward. Frø put the women of the dead king's family into a brothel for public humiliation. Hearing of this, Ragnar Lodbrok came with an army to avenge his grandfather Siward. Many of the women Frø had ordered abused dressed themselves in men's clothing and fought on Ragnar's side. Chief among them, and key to Ragnar's victory, was Lagertha. Saxo recounts:

Ladgerda, a skilled Amazon, who, though a maiden, had the courage of a man, and fought in front among the bravest with her hair loose over her shoulders. All marvelled at her matchless deeds, for her locks flying down her back betrayed that she was a woman.

— Gesta Danorum IX 4.2.

Impressed with her courage, Ragnar courted her from afar. Lagertha feigned interest, and Ragnar arrived to seek her hand, bidding his companions wait in the Gaular valley. He was set upon by a bear and a great hound which Lagertha had guarding her home, but killed the bear with his spear and choked the hound to death. Thus, he won the hand of Lagertha. According to Saxo, Ragnar had a son with her, Fridleif, as well as two daughters, whose names are not recorded.

After returning to Denmark to fight a civil war, Ragnar (who, according to Saxo, was still annoyed that Lagertha had set beasts against him) divorced Lagertha to marry Þóra borgarhjǫrtr, daughter of the Herrauðr, jarl of Västergötland. He won the hand of his new love after numerous adventures, but upon returning to Denmark was again faced with a civil war. Ragnar sent to Norway for support, and Lagertha, who still loved him, came to his aid with 120 ships, according to Saxo. When at the height of the battle, Ragnar's son Siward was wounded, Lagertha saved the day for Ragnar with a counter-attack:

Ladgerda, who had a matchless spirit though a delicate frame, covered by her splendid bravery the inclination of the soldiers to waver. For she made a sally about, and flew round to the rear of the enemy, taking them unawares, and thus turned the panic of her friends into the camp of the enemy.

— Gesta Danorum IX 4.11.

Upon returning to Norway, she quarrelled with her husband and slew him with a spearhead she concealed in her gown. Saxo concludes that she then "usurped the whole of his name and sovereignty; for this most presumptuous dame thought it pleasanter to rule without her husband than to share the throne with him".

== Scholarship ==
=== Saxo's sources ===
According to Judith Jesch, the rich variety of tales in the first nine books of Saxo's Gesta, which include the tale of Lagertha, are "generally considered to be largely fictional". In portraying the several warrior women in these tales, Saxo drew on the legend of the Amazons from classical antiquity, but also on a variety of Old Norse (particularly Icelandic) sources, which have not been clearly identified. Saxo's depiction of women warriors is also colored by misogyny: Like most churchmen of the time, Saxo thought of women only as sexual beings. To him, the Viking shieldmaidens who refused this role were an example of the disorder in old heathen Denmark that was later cured by the Church and a stable monarchy.

A woman called Hlaðgerðr, who rules the Hlaðeyjar, also appears in the sagas of the 6th century Scylding king Halfdan. She gives him twenty ships to help defeat his enemies. Hilda Ellis Davidson, in her commentary on the Gesta, also notes suggestions in the literature that the name was used by the Franks, for instance by Luitgarde of Vermandois (c. 914–978), and that the tale of Lagertha could have originated in Frankish tradition.

When Saxo describes Lagertha as "flying round" (circumvolare) to the rear of the enemy, he ascribes to her the power of flight, according to Jesch, indicating a kinship with the valkyries. The tale notably recalls that of Kára, the valkyrie lover of Helgi Haddingjaskati, who flies above Helgi in battle as a swan, casting spells in his support.

=== Identity with Thorgerd ===
Davidson deems it possible, as Nora K. Chadwick considered very probable, that Lagertha is identical with Þorgerðr Hǫlgabúðr (Swedish: Torgerd Holgabrud), a goddess reflected in several stories.

Thorgerd was worshipped by, and sometimes said to be wed to, the Norwegian ruler Haakon Sigurdsson (c. 937–995), who lived at Hlaðir (Lade). This may be the origin of Lagertha's likely name in her native Old Norse, Hlaðgerðr. Gaulardal, the Gaular valley – where Lagertha lived according to Saxo – lies nearby and was the center of Thorgerd's cult. It was also, according to Snorri Sturluson, the abode of Haakon's wife Thora. Finally, the description of Lagertha coming to Ragnar's aid with flying hair is similar to how the Flateyjarbók describes Thorgerd and her sister Irpa assisting Haakon.

== Portrayals in fiction ==
Christen Pram's historical drama Lagertha (1789) is based on Saxo's account.

The choreographer Vincenzo Galeotti based his ballet Lagertha (1801), the first ballet to feature a Nordic theme, on Pram's work. Set to music by Claus Schall, the ballet was a significant success for Galeotti's Royal Theater. It was conceived as a Gesamtkunstwerk incorporating song, pantomime, dance, and originally also dialog parts.

More recently, Lagertha (played by Katheryn Winnick) is a main character in the 2013 TV series Vikings. Broadly based on Saxo's account, the series portrays her as a shield-maiden and as Ragnar's first wife, who later rules as a jarl and then as a queen in her own right.

The upcoming expansion for Final Fantasy XIV, Evercold, will also feature Lagertha as the second-in-command of Naglfar, the Realmship of Water, named after a boat of the same name in Norse mythology.
