= The Vikings (film) =

1958 film by Richard Fleischer

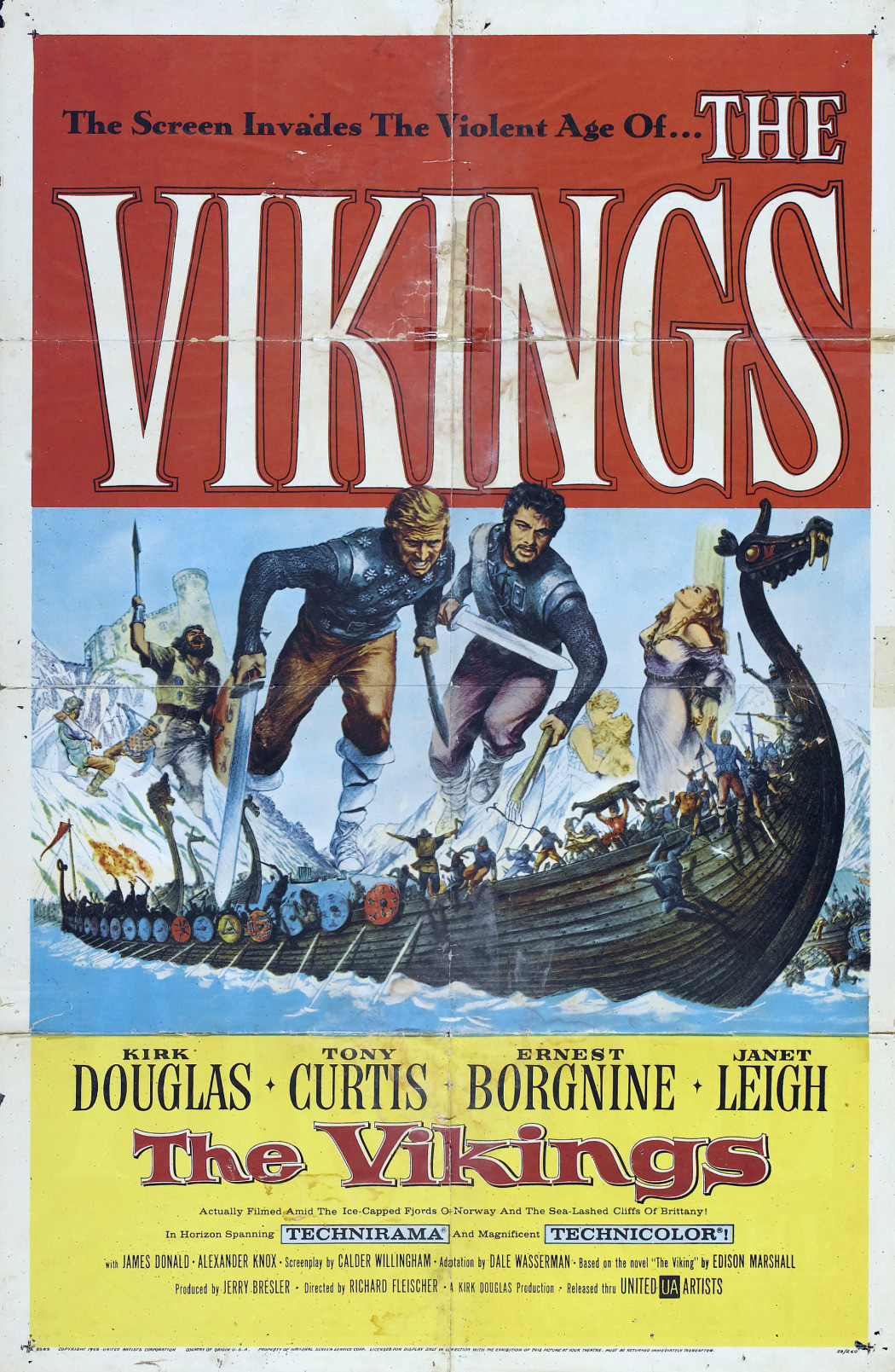
- Theatrical release poster by Reynold Brown
- Directed by: Richard Fleischer
- Screenplay by: Calder Willingham; Dale Wasserman (adaptation)
- Based on: The Viking; 1951 novel by Edison Marshall
- Produced by: Jerry Bresler
- Starring: Kirk Douglas; Tony Curtis; Ernest Borgnine; Janet Leigh; James Donald; Alexander Knox
- Narrated by: Orson Welles
- Cinematography: Jack Cardiff
- Edited by: Elmo Williams
- Music by: Mario Nascimbene
- Production companies: Brynaprod; Curtleigh Productions
- Distributed by: United Artists
- Release date: June 11, 1958 (New York)
- Running time: 116 minutes
- Country: United States
- Language: English
- Budget: $3.5 million
- Box office: ~$15 million (incl. $6.2 million US and Canada rentals, and $7 million overseas rentals)

The Vikings is a 1958 American epic historical fiction swashbuckling film directed by Richard Fleischer, filmed in Technirama, and printed in Technicolor. It was produced by Jerry Bresler and Kirk Douglas (who also starred in the film), through Douglas' Brynaprod company. It is based on the 1951 novel The Viking by Edison Marshall, which in turn is based on material from the sagas of Ragnar Lodbrok and his sons. Other starring roles were taken by then husband-and-wife Tony Curtis and Janet Leigh as well as Ernest Borgnine. The film made notable use of natural locations in Norway. It was mostly filmed in Maurangerfjorden and Maurangsnes, captured on film by cinematographer Jack Cardiff, although Aella's castle was the real Fort-la-Latte in north-east Brittany in France.

Despite being derisively called a "Norse Opera" (a pun on 'Horse Opera,' common term for Westerns used by critics of the time) by New York Times critic Bosley Crowther, the film proved a major box office success and spawned the television series Tales of the Vikings, directed by the film's editor, Elmo Williams, which included none of the original cast or characters.

== Plot ==
King Edwin of Northumbria is killed during a Viking raid led by King Ragnar Lodbrok. Because Edwin died childless, his cousin Aella takes the throne. The king's widow Enid, however, is pregnant with Ragnar's child. To protect the infant from Aella's ambitions, she sends him off to Italy. The ship is intercepted by the Vikings, who are unaware of the child's kinship and enslave him.

The boy grows into a young man named Eric. Lord Egbert, a Northumbrian nobleman opposed to Aella, discovers Eric's parentage. When Aella accuses him of treason, Egbert finds sanctuary with Ragnar in Norway. Egbert recognises the pommel stone of the Northumbrian royal sword Requiter on an amulet around Eric's neck, placed there by Eric's mother when he was a child, but says nothing.

Eric orders his falcon to attack Einar (his half-brother and Ragnar's legitimate son and heir). Einar loses an eye and becomes furious. Eric is saved from execution when the royal court Völva Kitala (who loves Eric as a son) warns that Odin will curse whoever kills him. He is left in a tidal pool to drown with the rising tide by Ragnar's decree to avoid the curse, but after Eric calls out to Odin, the wind shifts and forces the water away, saving him. Lord Egbert then claims him as his slave property to protect his rights, before Einar, aware of the weather shift, can return and finish him. Egbert wants to take advantage of Eric's unknown claim to the Northumbrian kingdom.

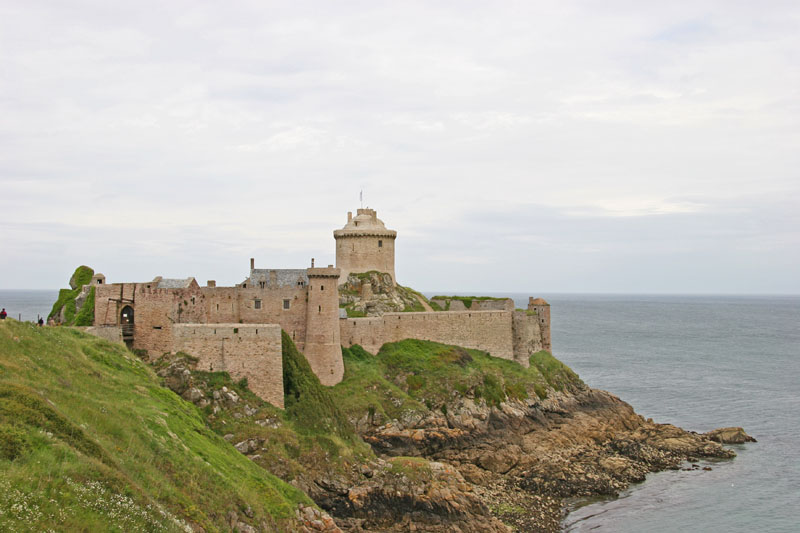
One of the filming locations at Fort-la-Latte

Eric and Einar fall in love with the Welsh Christian princess Morgana, who was to marry King Aella but is captured in a raid suggested by Egbert, to demand ransom and bring shame, political unpopularity and pressure upon the Northumbrian monarch. During a drunken feast, Einar confesses his feelings to Ragnar, who says that women often need to be taken by force. Einar is granted to take Morgana as his. Einar throws the guards off the ship Morgana is being held on, and begins to rape her — she offers no resistance, denying him his wish to take her by aggressive force. Eric eventually appears and knocks Einar out, then takes Morgana away on a small ship he had constructed for Egbert.

Eric and Morgana flee to England, along with Sandpiper (Eric's friend and fellow slave), Kitala and Morgana's maid Bridget. Einar regains consciousness and gives the alarm, and pursuing longships gain on the fugitives. In thick fog, Ragnar's longship hits a rock and sinks, while Eric's boat is guided safely by a primitive compass, a piece of magnetite that Sandpiper had found. Einar, in another longship, believes Ragnar to be dead and abandons the chase. Ragnar, however, is rescued by Eric and taken prisoner to Aella. Eric and Morgana become lovers during the trip, and she agrees to seek release from her pledge to marry Aella.

Aella orders Ragnar bound and thrown into a pit filled with starved wolves. To give Ragnar a Viking's death (so that he can enter Valhalla), Eric, who is granted the honour of forcing him into the pit, cuts the prisoner's bonds and gives him his sword. Laughing, Ragnar jumps to his death. In response to Eric's "treason", Aella cuts off his left hand, puts him back on his ship and casts him adrift. Eric returns to Einar's settlement, and tells his half-brother how his father died, and what had been Aella's reward for allowing Ragnar to have a Viking's death. With this revelation, and the promise that Eric will guide their ships through the fog (thus making a surprise attack possible), Einar persuades the other Vikings to mount an invasion of Northumbria. Putting their mutual hatred aside for the moment, Einar and Eric sail for England.

The dragon longships land, and the Vikings begin to move inland in force. The alarm is sounded, and the castle defenders assemble to repel the Vikings' assault. Einar has Vikings throw axes at the closed drawbridge that bars entrance to the castle's keep. Several axe-throwers are killed, but enough survive to throw their axes that a "ladder" is created for Einar to climb after he leaps across the moat to the drawbridge. He gains entry to the keep and lowers the drawbridge so that the other Vikings can overwhelm the outnumbered English. Eric and Einar both set off in search of Morgana. Eric encounters Aella instead and shoves him into the wolf pit.

Einar finds Morgana in the chapel in the highest tower of the keep and accosts her, saying that she will be his Queen. When Morgana says that she loves Eric, Einar drags her outside and calls Eric to their long-delayed battle. The two rivals engage in a sword fight on top of the tower. Eric is defeated, his sword broken, but as Einar prepares to deliver the killing blow, he hesitates, having learned the truth from Morgana, and seeing Ragnar in Eric's face. This gives Eric (who does not yet know they are brothers) the opportunity to fatally stab Einar with his sword's broken blade. Eric gives Einar a sword so that he too can enter Valhalla. Einar is given one type of a Viking funeral; cast off on a long ship, it is set on fire with burning arrows.

== Cast ==
- Kirk Douglas as Einar
- Tony Curtis as Eric
- Ernest Borgnine as Ragnar Lothbrok
- Janet Leigh as Morgana
- James Donald as Egbert
- Alexander Knox as Father Godwin
- Maxine Audley as Enid
- Frank Thring as Aella of Northumbria
- Eileen Way as Kitala
- Edric Connor as Sandpiper
- Dandy Nichols as Bridget
- Per Buckhøj as Bjorn Ironsides
- Orson Welles as the Narrator
- Paul Préboist

== Release ==
The film had a dual premiere at the Astor Theatre and Victoria Theatre on Broadway in New York City on June 11, 1958.

== Reception ==
The film was a hit in the US and overseas, earning $6.2 million in the US and Canada (from an estimated gross of $15 million) and $7 million overseas, including being the 3rd most popular film at the British box office in 1958. Kirk Douglas took no salary for the film in return for 60% of the profits, and was estimated to have earned $3 million from the film.

Bosley Crowther of The New York Times wrote, "The sight of those sleek Viking barges sweeping across the slate gray seas, loaded with bearded, brawny oarsmen, is something exciting to see, particularly in the wide-screen and color that are used very well in this film." However, Crowther was disappointed "that it follows a frank commercial format without any evident attempt to break new ground. Given the story of the Norsemen and the majestic adventures they surely had in carrying their explorations and colonizing the empty northern seas, it does seem that something more heroic and impressive could have been conceived than this copy of a Western, with standard varmints dressed up in shaggy skins." Variety called it "spectacular, rousing and colorful," adding, "Douglas, doing a bangup, free-wheeling job as the ferocious and disfigured Viking fighter, fits the part splendidly." Philip K. Scheuer of the Los Angeles Times wrote, "As drama and in emotional content the picture is so elementary, so exaggerated, that it can hardly be taken seriously by the discriminating cinemagoer. A kind of Prince Valiant without the prince, it is filled with pell-mell action that the adult eye will follow with a mixture of amusement and disbelief." Scheuer also thought the film's "assorted beatings, brutalities and beheadings" made it too violent for children. Leo Sullivan of The Washington Post stated, "Produced lavishly and filmed with magnificent beauty by that master, Jack Cardiff, The Vikings is so splendid it can't be classed as a dud. But the picture's simple storyline can't escape being a bore." John McCarten of The New Yorker wrote, "It's terrible stuff, but some of the views of the fiords are impressive." The Monthly Film Bulletin said, "There is nothing here to take seriously; yet, in its straightforward sentimental way, concentrating on some of the oldest elements in story-telling, this film creates a colourful fairy-tale world which is often entrancing, and suffers only from a rather wandering middle section."

The film holds a score of 77% on Rotten Tomatoes based on 22 reviews. The consensus summarizes: "Despite moments of excess, The Vikings has enough balance in its larger-than-life action sequences and characters to entertain."

== Awards ==
- Nominee Best Director - Directors Guild of America (Richard Fleischer)
- Winner Best Actor - San Sebastian International Film Festival (Kirk Douglas)

== Legacy ==
=== Soundtrack ===
Mario Nascimbene's score was the first music published through Kirk Douglas' music publishing company, Peter Vincent Music Corporation (named after his son Peter Vincent Douglas), a subsidiary of Bryna Productions. The soundtrack long play was initially announced for release by Dot Records, but was ultimately released by United Artists Records in a double-fold (gatefold) cover packaging in early June 1958.

=== Television series ===
Kirk Douglas's Bryna Productions produced a 1959 television series Tales of the Vikings. This picture is considered the "trigger film" for other contemporary Viking films including Mario Bava's Erik the Conqueror and several other Italian made Viking films as well as Jack Cardiff's (cinematographer on The Vikings) The Long Ships.

=== Comic book adaptation ===
- Dell Four Color #910 (June 1958)

== See also ==
- List of American films of 1958
- List of historical drama films

== Bibliography ==
- Hughes, Howard (2011). Cinema Italiano - The Complete Guide From Classics To Cult. London - New York: I.B.Tauris. ISBN 978-1-84885-608-0.
