= Ivar the Boneless =

Viking leader (died 873)

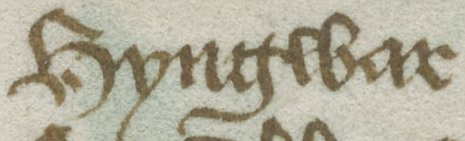
"Hyngwar", Ivar's name as it appears in Harley MS 2278, a fifteenth-century Middle English manuscript

Ivar the Boneless (Old Norse: Ívarr hinn Beinlausi [ˈiːˌwɑrː ˈhinː ˈbɛinˌlɔuse]; died c. 873), also known as Ivar Ragnarsson, was a Viking leader who led invasions into England and Ireland. According to the Tale of Ragnarr Loðbrók, he was the son of Aslaug and her husband Ragnar Loðbrok, and was the brother of Björn Ironside, Halvdan (or Hvitserk), Sigurd Snake-in-the-Eye, and Ragnvald. However, it is not known whether this is historically accurate. Ivar is sometimes regarded as the same person as Ímar, a Viking king of Dublin between 870 and 873.

It is unclear why Ivar acquired the nickname "boneless". Some sagas claim that he was born with a skeletal condition which left him unable to walk, while others suggest that he was merely impotent.

== Sources ==
According to the Tale of Ragnar Lodbrok, Ivar's boneless was the result of a curse. His mother, Aslaug, Ragnar's third wife, was described as a völva, a seer or clairvoyant. Aslaug suggested that she and her husband wait for three nights before consummating their marriage after a long separation while he was in England raiding. However, Ragnar was passionate after such a long separation and did not heed her words. As a result, Ivar was born with weak bones.

Another hypothesis is that he was actually known as "the Hated", which in Latin would be exosus. A medieval scribe with only a basic knowledge of Latin could easily have interpreted it as ex (without) os (bone), thus "the Boneless", although it is hard to align this theory with the direct translation of his name given in Norse sources.

While the sagas describe Ivar's physical disability, they also emphasise his wisdom, cunning, and mastery of strategy and tactics in battle.

He is often considered identical to Ímar, the founder of the Uí Ímair dynasty, which at various times, from the mid-ninth to the tenth century, ruled Northumbria from the city of York, and dominated the Irish Sea region as the Kingdom of Dublin. This would also make him the ancestor of the Crovan dynasty.

=== The invasion of England ===
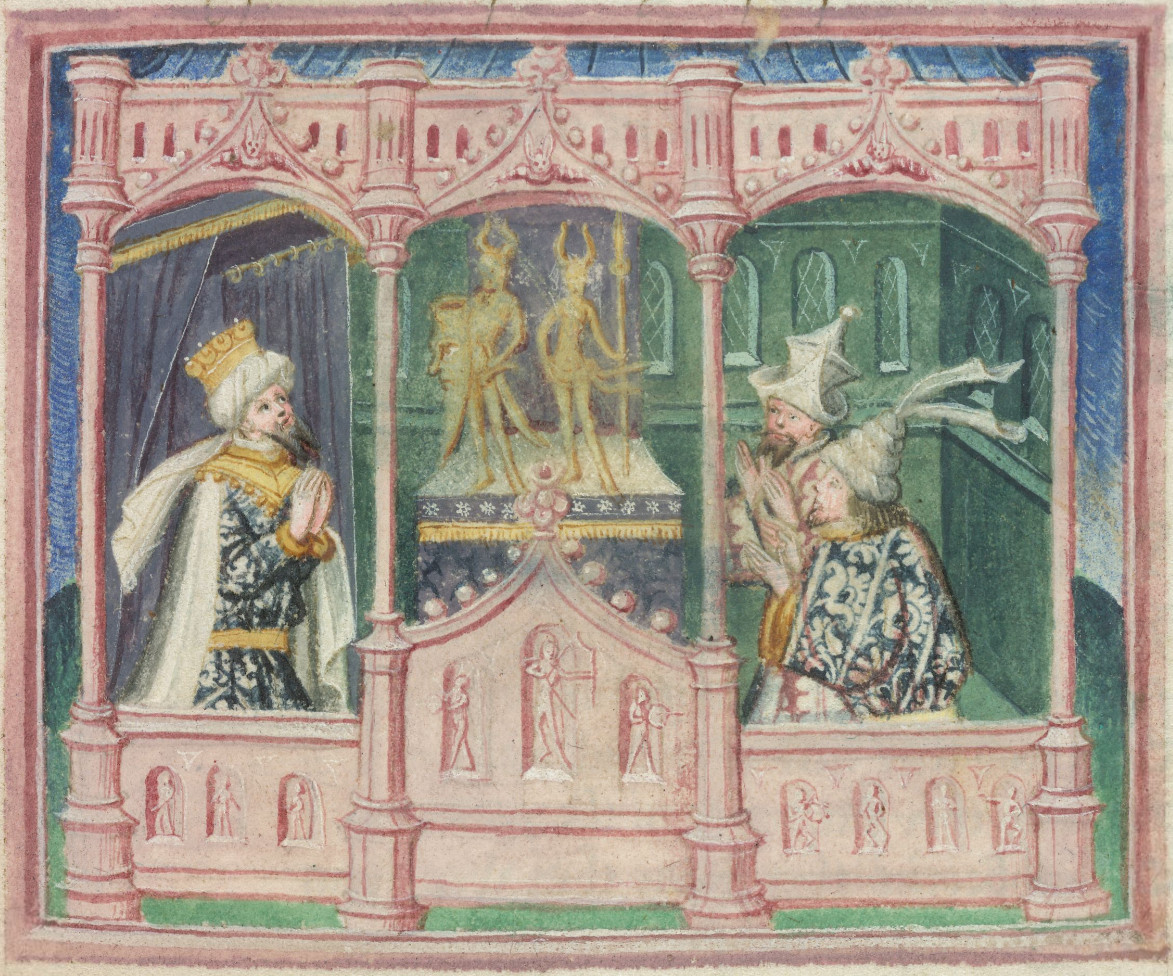
Lothbrocus and his sons Ivar and Ubba. 15th-century miniature in Harley MS 2278, folio 39r

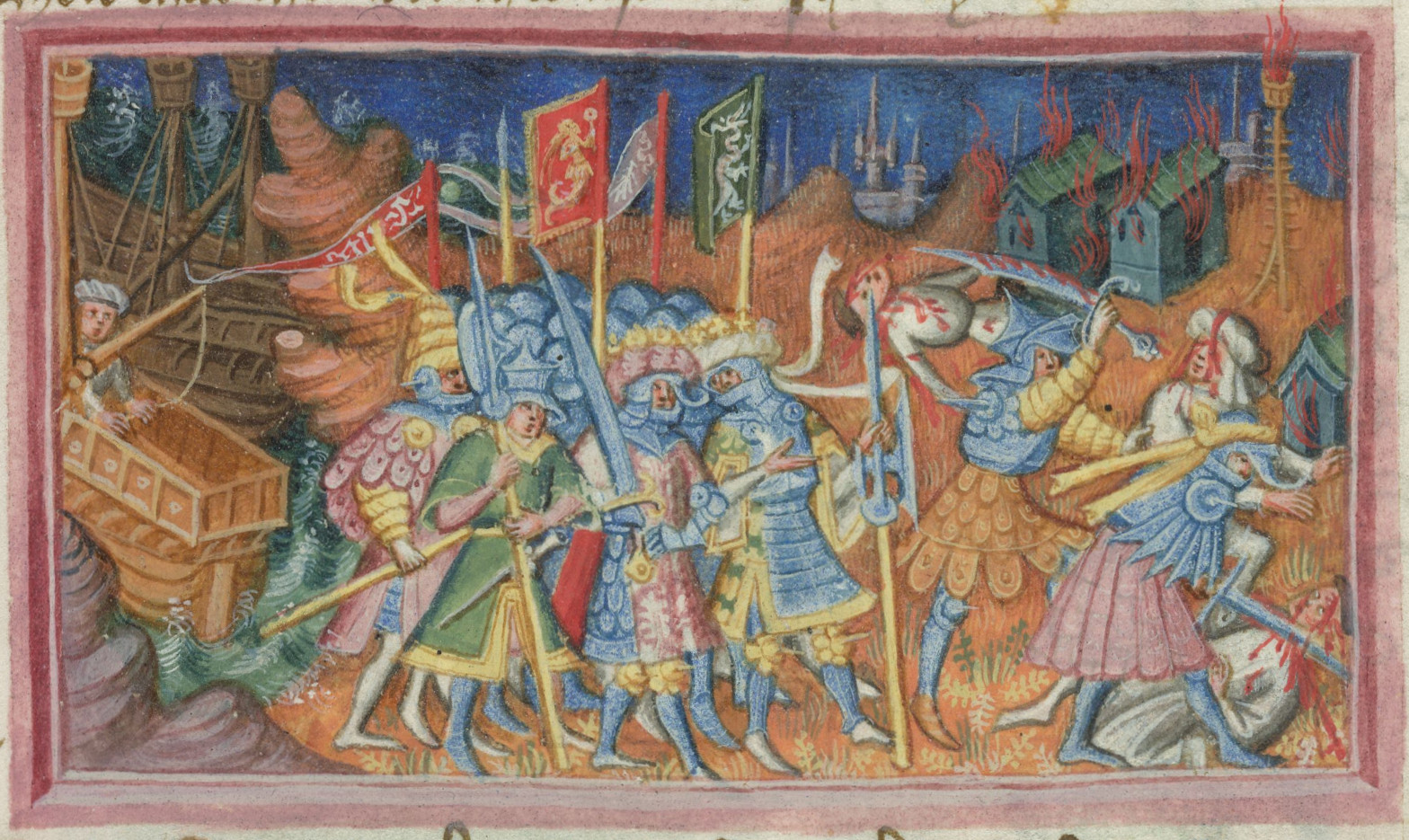
A fifteenth-century depiction of Ívarr and Ubba ravaging the countryside as it appears on folio 48r of British Library Harley 2278

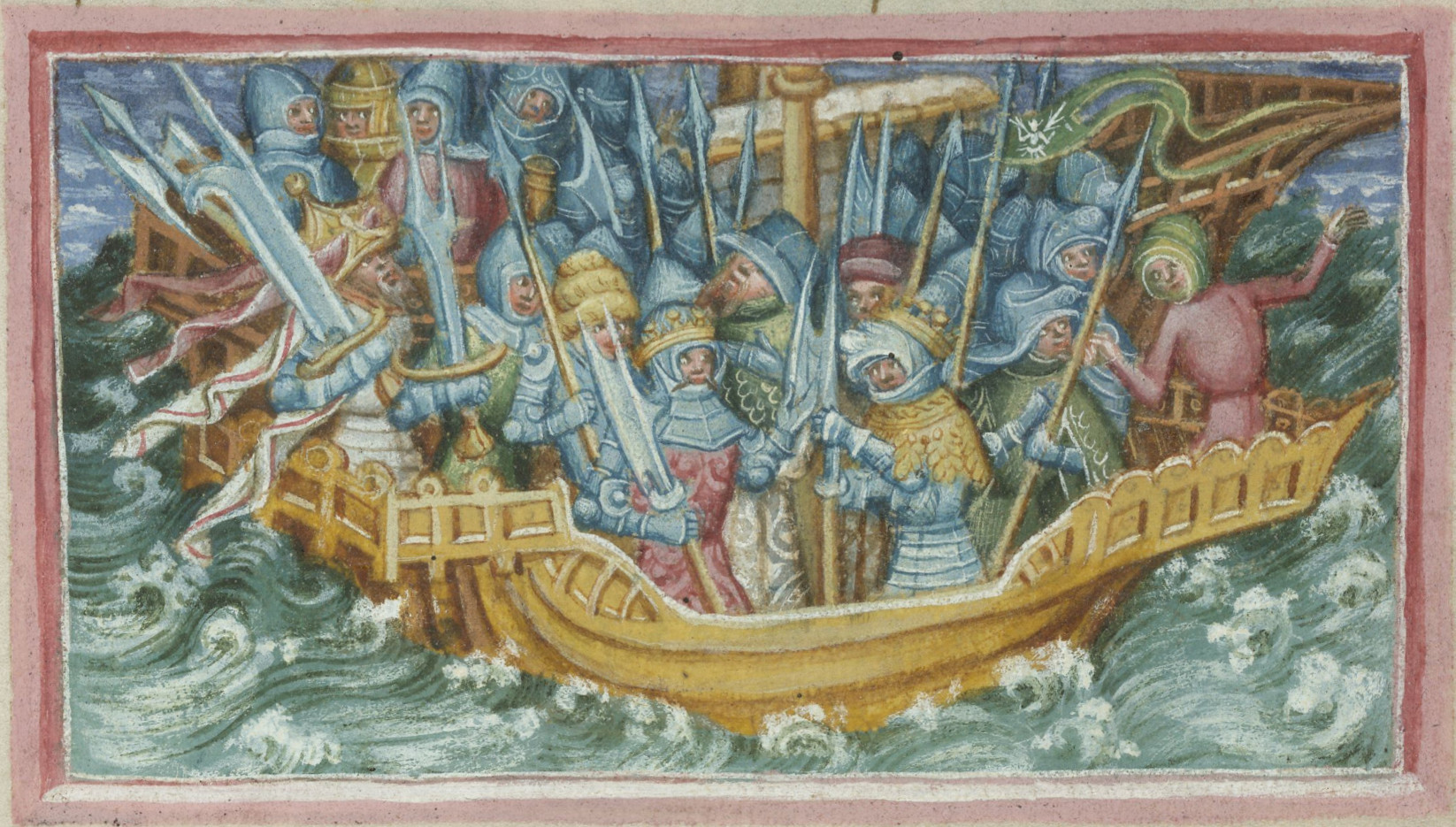
A depiction of Ívarr and Ubba setting forth to avenge their father, Loðbrók, as it appears on folio 47v of British Library Harley 2278

In 865, the Great Heathen Army, led by Ivar, invaded the Anglo-Saxon Heptarchy. These were the seven Anglo-Saxon kingdoms of East Anglia, Essex, Kent, Mercia, Northumbria, Sussex and Wessex. The invasion was organised by the sons of Ragnar Lothbrok, to wreak revenge against Ælla of Northumbria who had supposedly executed Ragnar in 865 by throwing him in a snake pit, but the historicity of this explanation is unknown. According to the saga, Ivar did not overcome Ælla and sought reconciliation. He asked for only as much land as he could cover with an ox's hide and swore never to wage war against Ælla. Then Ivar cut the ox's hide into such fine strands that he could envelop a large fortress (in an older saga it was York and according to a younger saga it was London), which he could take as his own (compare the similar legendary ploy of Dido).

Late the next year, the army turned north and invaded Northumbria, eventually capturing Ælla at York in 867. According to legend, Ælla was executed by Ivar and his brothers using the blood eagle, a ritual method of execution of debated historicity whereby the ribcage is opened from behind and the lungs are pulled out, forming a wing-like shape. Later in the year, the army moved south and invaded the kingdom of Mercia, capturing the town of Nottingham, where they spent the winter. King Burgred of Mercia responded by allying with the West Saxon king Æthelred of Wessex, and with a combined force they laid siege to the town. The Anglo-Saxons were unable to recapture the city, but a truce was agreed whereby the Danes would withdraw to York. The Great Heathen Army remained in York for over a year, gathering its strength for further assaults.

Ivar and Ubba are identified as the commanders of the Danes when they returned to East Anglia in 869, and as the executioners of the East Anglian king, Edmund the Martyr, for refusing their demand that he renounce Christ. The precise account of Edmund's death is unknown, but it has been suggested that his capture and execution at the hands of the sons of Ragnar is likely to have occurred.

== Death ==
The Anglo-Saxon chronicler Æthelweard records his death as 870. The Annals of Ulster describe the death of Ímar in 873. The death of Ímar is also recorded in the Fragmentary Annals of Ireland under the year 873.

The identification of the king of Laithlind as Gothfraid (i.e., Ímar's father) was added by a copyist in the 17th century. In the original 11th-century manuscript, the subject of the entry was simply called righ Lochlann ("the king of Lochlainn"), which more than likely referred to Ímar, whose death is not otherwise noted in the Fragmentary Annals. The cause of death—a sudden and horrible disease—is not mentioned in any other source, but it raises the possibility that the true origin of Ivar's Old Norse nickname lay in the crippling effects of an unidentified disease that struck him down at the end of his life.

In 1686, a farm labourer named Thomas Walker discovered a Scandinavian burial mound at Repton in Derbyshire, close to a battle site where the Great Heathen Army overthrew the Mercian king Burgred. The number of partial skeletons surrounding the body—over 250—signified that the man buried there was of very high status. It has been suggested that such a burial mound is possibly the last resting place of Ivar.

According to the saga, Ivar ordered that he be buried in a place that was exposed to attack, and prophesied that, if that was done, foes coming to the land would be met with ill-success. This prophecy held true, says the saga, until "when Vilhjalm bastard (William I of England) came ashore[,] he went [to the burial site] and broke Ivar's mound and saw that [Ivar's] body had not decayed. Then Vilhjalm had a large pyre made upon which Ivar's body was] burned... Thereupon, [Vilhjalm proceeded with the landing invasion and achieved] the victory."

== Fictional portrayals ==
- Ivar the Boneless is a minor character in the 1969 film Alfred the Great, portrayed as an acrobatic and agile warrior.
- In the 2013 film Hammer of the Gods, Ivar the Boneless is portrayed as a reclusive, homosexual Viking. The character was played by Ivan Kaye, who later portrayed King Ælla of Northumbria in the History television series Vikings.
- In Vikings, Ivar is portrayed as the son of Ragnar and Aslaug and a younger half-brother to Björn Ironside. He first appeared in season 2 as a baby, and later was played by James Quinn Markey and Alex Høgh Andersen.
- Ivar's invasion of East Anglia and killing of Edmund the Martyr are depicted in the video for The Darkness's song Barbarian.
- Ivar is a character in the 1993 novel The Hammer and the Cross.
- Ivar appears as a minor character in Bernard Cornwell's 2004 novel The Last Kingdom, in which his epithet "the Boneless" is explained by him being very thin. Ivar dies off-screen in the novel, and his later descendants continually appear throughout the remainder of the series.
- Ivar is a recurring character in Ubisoft's video game Assassin's Creed: Valhalla, which takes place in England between 873 CE and 878 CE. He plays a significant part in the main storyline of the game.
- In the 2020 game Crusader Kings 3 by Paradox Interactive, Ivar is a playable character as leader of the Jarldom of the Suðreyjar based in northwestern Scotland. His character is missing a leg, referring to his epithet "the Boneless".
