= Erpr lútandi =

Swedish court skald

Erpr lútandi was according to Skáldatal the court skald of the Swedish kings Eysteinn Beli and Björn at Haugi. There are no extant poems by Erpr.

Skáldatal tells that Erpr committed the crime of killing in a sanctuary. He avoided the death penalty by composing a drápa about Saurr konungshundr.

The Landnámabók adds that he had a daughter named Lopthœna who was the wife of Bragi Boddason, another skald of king Eysteinn Beli. Lopthœna and Bragi were ancestors of Gunnlaugr ormstunga.
