= Ragnvald Heidumhære =

Norwegian petty king

Ragnvald Heidumhære (or Rognvald) was a semi-historical petty king or chieftain of Vestfold in what is today Norway in the 9th century, according to Ynglingatal and to Ynglinga saga in Heimskringla. He was apparently a member of the Yngling clan (mentioned in later Norse and Anglo-Saxon literature, such as Beowulf). His name Heiðumhæri could be translated as highly honoured

His greatest contribution to posterity was that he asked the skald Þjóðólfr of Hvinir to compose a poem about his ancestry. This poem is known as Ynglingatal and is not only one of the oldest, but also one of the most famous and debated of the Old Norse poems.

Þjóðólfr ended the poem with these lines:

Under the heaven's blue dome, a name
I never knew more true to fame
Than Rognvald bore; whose skilful hand
Could tame the scorners of the land, —
Rognvald, who knew so well to guide
The wild sea-horses through the tide:
The Heidumhære was the proud name
By which the king was known to fame.

== Family ==
Traditional sources differ as to whether Ragnvald Heidumhære was the son of Ragnar Lodbrok or of Olaf Geirstad-Alf.

The 13th-century account in Heimskringla, which uses Ynglingatal as a source, makes Ragnvald a cousin of Harald Fairhair.

A dubious, later pedigree attributes to Ragnvald a daughter, Åsa Ragnvaldsdatter (Aseda Rognvaldsdatter), who married Eystein Ivarsson. It is through this line that Ragnvald Heidumhære is a purported ancestor of William the Conqueror (and subsequent British royal houses); when identified with Earl Rognvald Eysteinsson that is, father of Rollo.

== See also ==
- Fornjót
