= Ælla of Northumbria =

Ælla
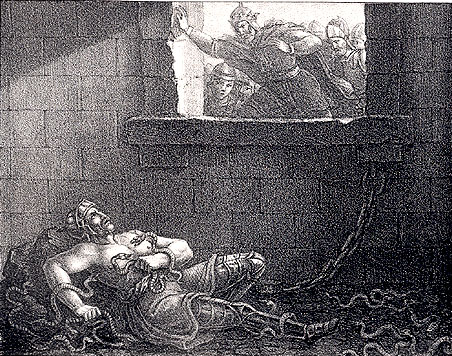
- Ælle kills Ragnar Lothbrok, illustration by Hugo Hamilton

King of Northumbria
- Reign: AD 862–867
- Predecessor: Osberht
- Successor: Ecgberht
- Born: c. 815
- Died: 21 March 867 (aged 51–52); York, Northumbria
- House: Northumbria

Ælla (or Ælle or Aelle, fl. 866; died 21 March 867) was King of Northumbria, a kingdom in early medieval England, during the middle of the 9th century. Sources on Northumbrian history in this period are limited, and so Ælla's ancestry is not known, and the dating of the beginning of his reign is questionable.

In addition to the Anglo-Saxon Chronicle, Ælla is also mentioned in Scandinavian oral sources, such as the Norse sagas. According to the latter, Ælla captured the legendary Swedish-Danish Viking king Ragnar Lodbrok and put him to death in a pit of snakes. The historical invasion of Northumbria by the Great Heathen Army in 866 occurred in retaliation for Ragnar's execution, according to Ragnarssona þáttr (The Tale of Ragnar's Sons). While Norse sources claim that Ragnar's sons tortured Ælla to death by the method of the blood eagle, Anglo-Saxon accounts maintain that he died in battle at York on 21 March 867. Concerning the Norse claim, Roberta Frank reviewed the historical evidence for the ritual in her Viking Atrocity and Skaldic Verse: The Rite of the Blood-Eagle, where she writes: "By the beginning of the ninth century, the various saga motifs—eagle sketch, rib division, lung surgery, and 'saline stimulant'—were combined in inventive sequences designed for maximum horror." She concludes that the authors of the sagas misunderstood alliterative kennings that alluded to leaving one's foes face down on the battlefield, their backs torn as carrion by scavenging birds. If this is to be believed, then it is easy to surmise that the mention of his death via the blood eagle is in fact a description of his death on the battlefield, which would make the two accounts of his death consistent.

== Anglo-Saxon accounts ==
Ælla became king after Osberht (Osbryht) was deposed. The beginning of his reign is traditionally dated to 862 or 863 but evidence about Northumbrian royal chronology is unreliable prior to 867. His reign may have begun as late as 866. Almost nothing is known of Ælla's reign; Symeon of Durham states that Ælla had seized lands at Billingham, Ileclif, Wigeclif, and Crece, which belonged to the church. While Ælla is described in most sources as a tyrant and an illegitimate king, one source states that he was Osberht's brother.

The Great Heathen Army, composed mostly of Danish, Norwegian and Frisian Vikings, landed in Northumbria in mid-866 and had captured York by 21 November.

Subsequent events are described by historians such as Symeon of Durham, Asser and Æthelweard in accounts that vary only in detail. According to the Historia Regum Anglorum, following the invasion of the Danes, the previous "dissension" between Osberht and Ælla "was allayed by divine counsel" and other Northumbrian nobles. Osberht and Ælla "having united their forces and formed an army, came to the city of York" on 21 March 867. A majority of the "shipmen" (Vikings) gave the impression of fleeing from the approaching Northumbrians. "The Christians, perceiving their flight and terror", attacked, but found that the Vikings "were the stronger party". Surrounded, the Northumbrians "fought upon each side with much ferocity" until both Osberht and Ælla were killed. The surviving Northumbrians "made peace with the Danes".

After this, the Vikings appointed a puppet king of Northumbria, named Ecgberht.

The Anglo-Saxon Chronicle does not name the Viking leaders, but it does state that "Hingwar and Hubba" (probably Ivar and Ubba) later killed King Edmund of East Anglia. Ubba was also named as a leader of the army in Northumbria by Abbo of Fleury and by the Historia de Sancto Cuthberto. Symeon of Durham lists the leaders of the Viking army as "Halfdene [Halfdann], Inguar [Ingvar], Hubba, Beicsecg, Guthrun, Oscytell [Ketill], Amund, Sidroc and another duke of the same name, Osbern, Frana and Harold."

== Family ==
Ælla has been identified as the brother of Osberht of Northumbria. According to an Anglo-Norman genealogy, Ælla had a daughter named Æthelthryth and through her was the grandfather of Eadwulf of Bamburgh, "King of the Northern English" who died in 913.

== Norse sources ==
According to Ragnarssona þáttr, the army that seized York in 866 was led by Hvitserk, Björn Ironside, Sigurd Snake-in-the-Eye, Ivar the Boneless and Ubba, sons of Ragnar Lodbrok, who avenged his death by subjecting Ælla to the blood eagle. However, Anglo-Saxon sources claim that Ælla and Osberht died in battle at York, with the Anglo-Saxon Chronicle stating that "both the kings were slain on the spot".

Ivar the Boneless, who plays a major role in both Norse and Anglo-Saxon accounts, is sometimes associated with the Viking leader Ímar (Old Norse: Ívarr), a King of Dublin mentioned in the Irish annals. Scholar Dorothy Whitelock regards this association as unlikely, however, because Ímar's father is usually said to be Gofraid of Lochlann and his brothers are usually named as Amlaíb Conung and Auisle. As Dorothy Whitelock notes, the names Ívarr and Ímar were "not uncommon" in Norse societies.

== Other ==
Hector Boece relates that two Northumbrian princes, Osbrecht and Ella, took the castle at Stirling.

== Cultural references ==
Aella, King of Northumbria, has a major supporting role in Geoffrey Chaucer's The Man of Law's Tale.

Ælla was played by Frank Thring in the film The Vikings (1958) as the main antagonist.

A character broadly based on Ælla is played by Ivan Kaye in the History Channel's drama series Vikings (2013), though it is set nearly 70 years before the real Ælla's reign. The show gives no indication that this Ælla had usurped his throne, and he is shown to have reigned in Northumbria for more than 15 years. The show also gave Ælla a daughter, Judith, who takes the historical role of Osburh, as the mother of Alfred the Great. The character's name seems taken from Judith of Flanders, Alfred's stepmother, but doesn't share much more. In the fourth season, he executes Viking leader Ragnar Lothbrok by throwing him into a pit of snakes, and he is executed in retaliation by Ragnar's sons via the blood eagle.

In The Last Kingdom, a historical novel by Bernard Cornwell, Ælla appears very briefly as a minor character at the beginning of the book. He, along with Osberht and Uhtred, a fictional Ealdorman of Bernicia, lead a Northumbrian army to repel invading Danes at York. The battle ends disastrously for the Northumbrians when the Norse army feigns a retreat, and Ælla dies on the field.

== Notes ==
Regnal titles
Preceded by Osberht	King of Northumbria; 866–867	Succeeded by Ecgberht I
