= Ragnar Lodbrok =

Legendary king of Sweden and Denmark

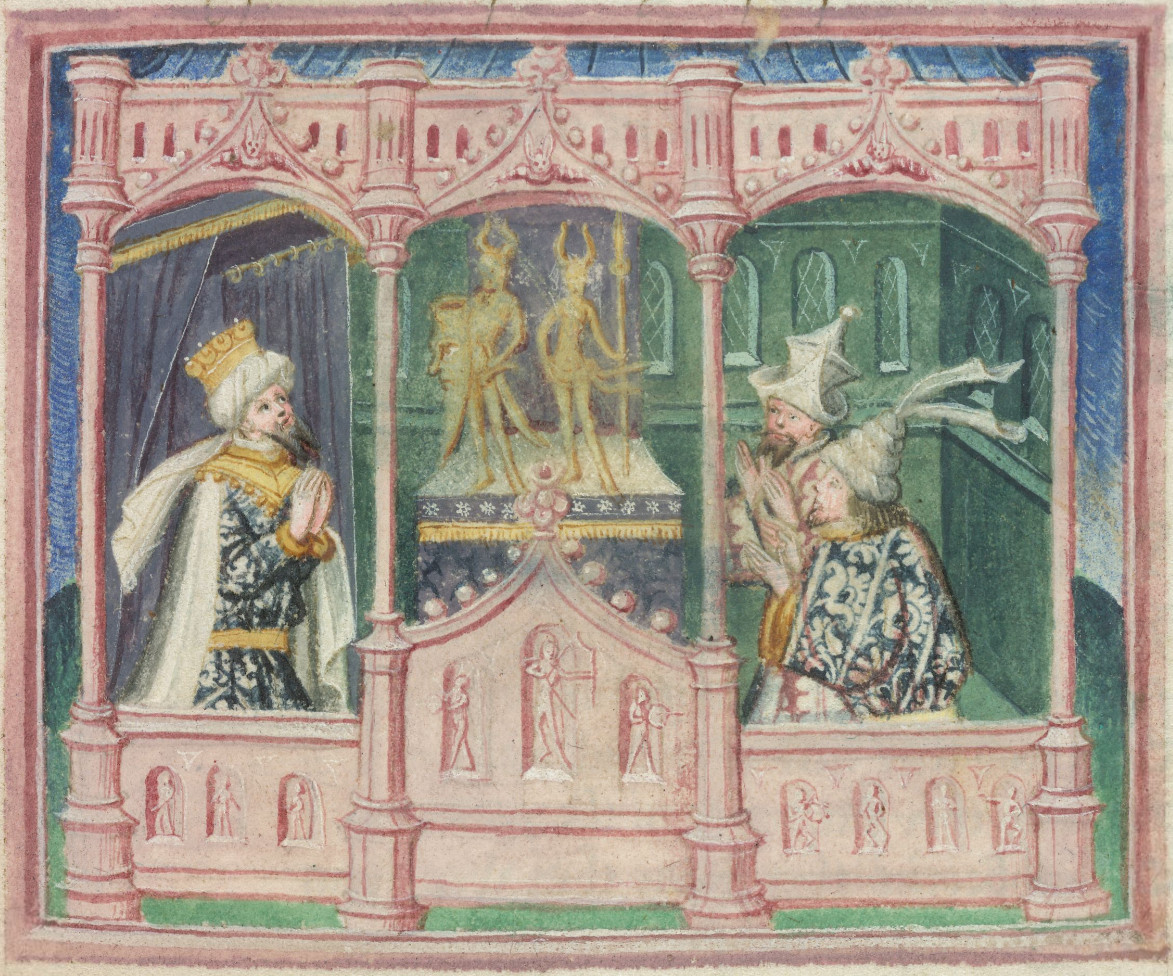
- Ragnar Lodbrok with sons Ivar and Ubba, 15th-century miniature in Harley MS 2278 folio 39r
- Died: Traditional date: 865; Kingdom of Northumbria
- Known for: Legendary exploits and raids across Europe
- Predecessor: Sigurd Ring (according to legend)
- Successor: Sigurd Snake-in-the-Eye (according to legend)
- Parents: Sigurd Ring (according to legend) (father); Åsa, daughter of King Harald of the Red Moustache (according to legend) (mother)

Ragnar Lodbrok or Ragnar Lothbrok (Old Norse: Ragnar loðbrók, lit. 'Ragnar hairy-breeches'), (Note: "Ragnar" (meaning Raven) and "Lodbrok" (meaning "leather trousers" or "hairy breeches").: Old Norse: Ragnarr Loðbrók [ˈrɑɣnˌɑrː ˈloðˌbroːk], "Ragnar shaggy breeches"; Modern Danish: Regnar Lodbrok; Modern Icelandic: Ragnar Loðbrók [ˈraknˌar ˈlɔðˌprouːk]; Modern Norwegian: Ragnar Lodbrok; Modern Swedish: Ragnar Lodbrok) according to legends, was a Viking hero and a Swedish and Danish king.

He is known from Old Norse poetry of the Viking Age, Icelandic sagas, and near-contemporary chronicles. According to traditional literature, Ragnar distinguished himself by conducting many raids against the British Isles and the Carolingian Empire during the 9th century. He also appears in Norse legends, and according to the legendary sagas Tale of Ragnar's Sons and a Saga about Certain Ancient Kings, Ragnar Lodbrok's father has been given as the legendary king of the Swedes, Sigurd Ring.

== Accounts ==
=== Icelandic sagas ===
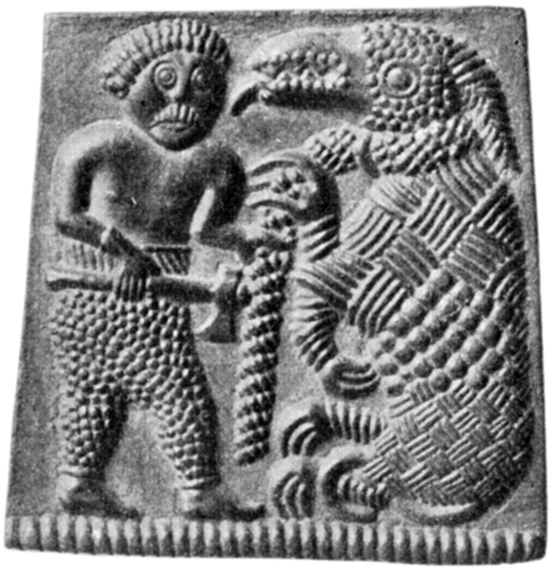
A warrior with shaggy breeches, killing a beast, on one of the Torslunda plates. The man has been identified with Ragnar Lodbrok in an early Swedish version of the legend (Schück). More recently, it has been interpreted as showing a Germanic initiation ritual in which shaggy trousers played a role and which may subsequently have contributed to the legend of Ragnar Lodbrok.

According to the Tale of Ragnar Lodbrok, Tale of Ragnar's Sons, Heimskringla, Hervarar saga ok Heiðreks, Sögubrot af nokkrum fornkonungum, and many other Icelandic sources, Ragnar was the son of the king of Sweden Sigurd Ring. When Sigurd Ring's parentage is given in a saga, his father is identified as Randver, who in Hervarar saga is called a king of Denmark whose wife was Åsa, the daughter of King Harald of the Red Moustache from Norway. According to Sögubrot and the Lay of Hyndla, Randver was the son of Ráðbarðr the king of Garðaríki. The accounts further tell that Randver was a grandson of the legendary Scandinavian king Ivar Vidfamne by his daughter Aud (whom the Hervarar saga calls Alfhild). After the death of King Ivar Vidfamne, Aud's eldest son by the Danish king Hrœrekr Ringslinger, Harald, conquered all of his grandfather's territory and became known as Harald Wartooth. Harald's nephew Sigurd Ring became the chief king of Sweden after Randver's death (Denmark according to the Hervarar saga), presumably as the subking of Harald. Sigurd and Harald fought the Battle of the Brávellir (Bråvalla) on the plains of Östergötland, where Harald and many of his men died. Sigurd then ruled Sweden and Denmark (being sometimes identified with a Danish king Sigfred who ruled from about 770 until his death prior to 804). He sired a son with the princess Alfhild of the petty kingdom of Álfheimr, Ragnar Lodbrok, who succeeded him. Eysteinn Beli, who according to the Hervarar Saga was Harald Wartooth's son, ruled Sweden sometime after Sigurd until he was slain by the sons of Ragnar and Aslaug.

In their accounts of his reign, the fornaldarsǫgur (Legendary sagas, or sagas of Scandinavian prehistory), tell more about Ragnar's marriages than about feats of warfare. In the Saga of Ragnar Lothbrok, Ragnar is introduced by introducing his alleged father Sigurd Ring who, according to the Saga, ruled over Denmark. In the Saga, Ragnar is Introduced as a big man, handsome and well-provided with wisdom. He was good to his men and cruel to his enemies. Ragnar's first account in the saga was to assemble an army, a fleet of ships, becoming a great warrior and slaying a dragon in the Norse lands of Götaland.

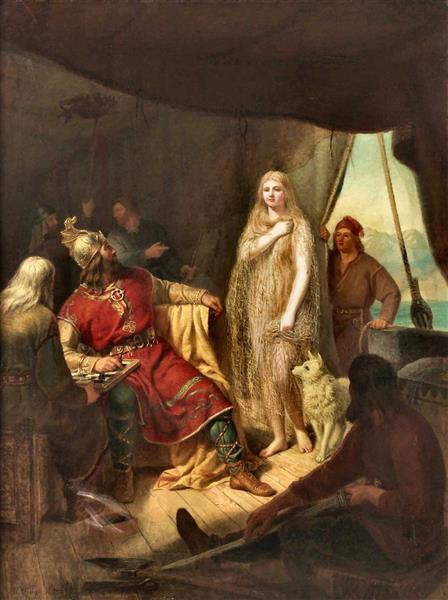
Ragnar Lodbrog meets Kraka by 19th century artist Mårten Eskil Winge

According to the Sögubrot, "he was the biggest and fairest of men that human eyes have seen, and he was like his mother in appearance and took after her kin". He first killed a giant snake that guarded the abode of the Geatish jarl Herrauð's daughter Thora Borgarhjort, thereby winning her as his wife. The unusual protective clothes that Ragnar wore when attacking the serpent earned him the nickname Lodbrok. His sons with Thora were Erik and Agnar. After Thora died, he discovered Kráka, a woman of outstanding beauty and wisdom living with a poor peasant couple in Norway, and married her. This marriage resulted in the sons Ivar the Boneless, Björn Ironside, Hvitserk, Ragnvald, and Sigurd Snake-in-the-Eye. Kráka was later revealed to actually be Aslaug, a secret daughter of the renowned hero Sigurd Fafnesbane. As the sons grew up to become renowned warriors, Ragnar, not wishing to be outdone, resolved to conquer England with merely two ships. He was, however, defeated by superior Northumbrian forces and was thrown into a snake pit to die. The Saga of Ragnar Lodbrok, Tale of Ragnar's Sons, and Heimskringla all tell of the Great Heathen Army that invaded England at around 866, led by the sons of Ragnar Lodbrok to wreak revenge against King Ælla of Northumbria who is told to have captured and executed Ragnar.

=== Danish sources ===
The Chronicon Roskildense (c. 1138) mentions Lodbrok (Lothpardus) as a father to the utterly cruel Norse King Ywar (rex crudelissimus Normannorum Ywar) and his brothers, Inguar (a double of Ywar), Ubbi, Byorn and Ulf, who rule the northern peoples. They call on the various Danish petty kings to help them ruin the realm of the Franks. Ywar successfully attacks the kingdoms of Britain, though not as an act of revenge as in the Icelandic sagas. The chronicle of Sven Aggesen (c. 1190) is the first Danish text that mentions the full name, Regnerus Lothbrogh. His son Sigurd invades Denmark and kills its king, whose daughter he marries as he takes over the throne. Their son in turn is Knut, ancestor of the later Danish kings.

Neither of these sources mentions Ragnar Lodbrok as a Danish ruler. The first to do so is Saxo Grammaticus in his work Gesta Danorum (c. 1200). This work mixes Norse legend with data about Danish history derived from the chronicle of Adam of Bremen (c. 1075). Here Ragnar's father Sigurd Ring is a Norwegian prince married to a Danish princess, and different from the victor of Brávellir (who had flourished about thirteen generations earlier). Sigurd Ring and his cousin and rival Ring (that is, Sigfred and Anulo of recorded history, d. 812) are both killed in battle, whereupon Ragnar is elevated to the Danish kingship (identified by Saxo with Ragnfred, d. 814). His first deed is the defeat of the Swedish king Frö, who has killed Ragnar's grandfather. Ragnar is assisted in this by a ferocious shield-maiden named Ladgerda (Lagertha), whom Ragnar forces to marry him after killing a bear and a great hound to win her hand. In this marriage, he sires the son Fridleif and two daughters. Ragnar later repudiates his marriage to Ladgerda and marries Thora Borgarhjort, a daughter of the Swedish king Herrauðr, after killing two venomous giant snakes that guard Thora's residence. His sons with Thora are Radbard, Dunvat, Sigurd Snake-in-the-Eye, Björn Ironside, Agnar and Ivar the Boneless. From a non-marital relationship with an unnamed woman (described only as the daughter of a man named Esbjørn), Ragnar fathered Ubbe. Another, final marriage to Svanlaug (possibly another name for Aslaug) produces another three sons: Ragnvald, Eric Weatherhat and Hvitserk.

The sons were installed as sub-kings in various conquered territories. Ragnar led a Viking expedition to England and killed its king, Hama, before killing the earls of Scotland and installing Sigurd Snake-in-the Eye and Radbard as governors. Norway was also subjugated, and Fridleif was made ruler there and in Orkney. Later on, Ragnar with three sons invaded Sweden where a new king called Sörle had appeared and withheld the heritage of Thora's sons. Sörle and his army were massacred, and Björn Ironside was installed on the throne. Sometime later Björn was put in charge of Norway, while Ragnar appointed another son, Eric Weatherhat, as ruler in Sweden; he was subsequently killed by a certain Eysteinn. One of the sons, Ubbe, revolted against his father at the instigation of his maternal grandfather Esbjørn, and could only be defeated and captured with utmost effort. Saxo moreover tells of repeated expeditions to the British Isles, one of which cost the lives of Dunvat and Radbard. Ælla, son of Hama, with the help of allies known collectively as the Galli – possibly a group of Norse-Gaels (who were known in Old Irish as Gall-Goídil), expelled Ragnar's sub-ruler Ivar the Boneless from England and remained a persistent enemy. Finally, the Scythians were forced to accept Hvitserk as their ruler. In the end, Hvitserk was treacherously captured by the Hellespontian prince Daxon and burnt alive with his own admission. Hearing this, Ragnar led an expedition to Kievan Rus' and captured Daxon who was spared and exiled.

Unlike the Icelandic sources, Saxo's account of Ragnar Lodbrok's reign is largely a catalog of successful Viking invasions over an enormous geographical area. Among the seaborne expeditions was one against the Bjarmians and Finns (Saami) in the Arctic north. The Bjarmian use of magic spells caused foul weather and the sudden death of many Danish invaders, and the Finnish archers on skis turned out to be a formidable foe. Eventually, these two tribes were put to flight, and the Bjarmian king was slain. The historical king Harald Klak is by Saxo (based on a passage in Adam's chronicle) made into another persistent enemy of Ragnar, who several times incited the Jutes and Scanians to rebel, but was regularly defeated. After the last victory over Harald, Ragnar learned that King Ælla had massacred Ragnar's men on Ireland. Incensed, he attacked the English king with his fleet but was captured and thrown to his death in the snake pit – the fate ascribed by tradition to the early Burgundian king Gunnar, as recounted in the Icelandic sagas. In spite of all his praise for Ragnar Lodbrok, Saxo also considers his fate as God's rightful vengeance for the contempt he had shown the Christian religion.

=== Poetic and epigraphic sources ===
While the narrative Norse sources date from the 12th and 13th centuries, there are also many older poems that mention him and his kin. The Ragnarsdrápa, ostensibly composed by Bragi Boddason in the 9th century, praises a Ragnar, son of Sigurd, for a richly decorated shield that the poet has received. The shield depicts the assault on Jörmunrek, the Hjaðningavíg tale, the ploughing of Gefjon, and Thor's struggle with the Midgard Serpent. Recent scholarship has suggested that the poem is in fact from c. 1000 and celebrates the Norse reconquest of England. The four tales depicted on the shield would then symbolize four aspects of the Lodbrok saga (the initial defeat of the sons of Lodbrok in England due to recklessness, Ivar the Boneless's deceitful approach to King Ælla, Ivar's cunning snatching of land from Ælla, Ragnar's struggle against the giant serpent in order to win Thora). The Knutsdrapa of Sigvat Thordarson (c. 1038) mentions the death of Ælla at the hands of Ivar in York, who "carved the eagle on Ælla's back". From this, the story of the atrocious revenge of Lodbrok's sons already seems to be present. The reference to a "blood eagle" punishment has, however, been much debated by modern scholars. Another lay, Krakumal, put in the mouth of the dying Ragnar in the snake pit, recounts the exploits of Ragnar and mentions battles over a wide geographical area, several relating to the British Isles. The poem's name, "Kráka's lay", alludes to Ragnar's wife's Kráka, though modern philologists commonly date it to the 12th century in its present form.

The poem the Lay of Kraka or Krakumal tells the last words of Ragnar Lothbrok during his execution by King Aellla of the Kingdom of Northumbria. In the poem Ragnar makes its usual mentions of different Norse divinities and magical elements such as Valhalla as in the end of the poem Ragnar says:

We hewed with the brand!
Full gladly do I go! See the Valkyrjar fresh from Odin's halls!
High-seated among heroes shall I quaff the yellow-mead.
The Aesir welcome me. Laughing gladly do I die!

There is one runic inscription mentioning Lodbrok, carved on the prehistorical tumulus of Maeshowe on Orkney in the early 12th century. It reads: "This howe was built a long time before Lodbrok's. Her sons, they were bold; scarcely ever were there such tall men of their hands". The expression "her sons" has given rise to the theory that Lodbrok was originally thought of as a woman, mother of the historically known sons.

=== Frankish accounts of a 9th-century Viking leader ===
The Siege of Paris and the Sack of Paris of 845 were the culmination of a Viking invasion of the kingdom of the West Franks. The Viking forces were led by a Norse chieftain named "Reginherus", or Ragnar. This Ragnar has often been tentatively identified with the legendary saga figure Ragnar Lodbrok, but the accuracy of this is disputed by historians. Ragnar Lodbrok is also sometimes identified with a Ragnar who was awarded land in Torhout, Flanders, by Charles the Bald in about 841 but eventually lost the land as well as the favour of the King. Ragnar's Vikings raided Rouen on their way up the Seine in 845 and in response to the invasion, determined not to let the royal Abbey of Saint-Denis (near Paris) be destroyed, Charles assembled an army which he divided into two parts, one for each side of the river. Ragnar attacked and defeated one of the divisions of the smaller Frankish army, took 111 of their men as prisoners and hanged them on an island on the Seine to honour the Norse god Odin, as well as to incite terror in the remaining Frankish forces. Ragnar's fleet made it back to his overlord, the Danish King Horik I, but Ragnar soon died from a violent illness that also spread in Denmark.

=== Later continental accounts ===
Among the oldest texts to mention the name Lodbrok is the Norman history of William of Jumièges from c. 1070. According to William, the Danish kings of old had the custom to expel the younger sons from the kingdom to have them out of the way. It was during the time this practice was in fashion that King Lodbrok succeeded his unnamed father on the Danish throne. After gaining power, he honoured the said custom and ordered his junior son Björn Ironside to leave his realm. Björn thus left Denmark with a considerable fleet and started to ravage in West Francia and later the Mediterranean. Roughly contemporary with William is Adam of Bremen whose history of the Archbishopric of Hamburg-Bremen contains many traditions about Viking Age Scandinavia. In a passage referring to the Viking raids of the late 9th century, he mentions the Danish or Norse pirates Horich, Orwig, Gotafrid, Rudolf, and Inguar (Ivar). This Ivar is, in particular, seen as a cruel persecutor of Christians, and a son of Lodbrok (Inguar, filius Lodparchi).

=== Anglo-Saxon and Irish accounts of the father of Ivar and Halfdan ===
According to the contemporary Anglo-Saxon Chronicle and Asser's Life of Alfred, in 878 the "brother of Hingwar and Healfden", with a naval fleet, a contingent of the Great Heathen Army invaded Devon in England and fought the Battle of Cynwit. There the Vikings lost, their king slain and many dead, with few escaping to their ships. After the battle the Saxons took great plunder, and among other things the banner called "Raven". The early 12th century Annals of St Neots further state that "they say that the three sisters of Hingwar and Hubba, daughters of Lodebroch (Lodbrok), wove that flag and got it ready in one day. They say, moreover, that in every battle, wherever the flag went before them, if they were to gain the victory, a live crow would appear flying on the middle of the flag; but if they were doomed to be defeated, it would hang down motionless, and this was often proved to be so." This is among the earlier references to the legendary hero Ragnar Lodbrok.

The Irish Cogad Gáedel re Gallaib from the 12th century, with information deriving from earlier annals, mentions king Halfdan (d. 877) under the name "mac Ragnaill". The form Ragnall may refer to either Ragnvald or Ragnar and the entry is a strong indication that the name of Ivar's and Halfdan's father was really Ragnar or a similar name. The early 11th century Three Fragments contains a passage that gives a semi-legendary background to the capture of York (Jórvík) by the Vikings in 866. The two younger sons of Halfdan, King of Lochlann, expelled the eldest son, Ragnall, who sailed to the Orkney islands with his three sons and settled there. Two of the sons later raided the English and Franks, proceeding to plunder in the Mediterranean. One of them learned from a vision that Ragnall had fought a battle where the third son had been slain and in which he himself had most likely perished. The two Viking sons then returned home with a lot of dark-skinned captives. It has been hypothesized that this is an Irish version of Ragnar Lodbrok's saga, the Mediterranean expedition being a historical event taking place in 859-61.

== Mythical accounts of Ragnar ==
=== The Saga of Ragnar Lothbrok ===
The 13th century Icelandic saga Saga of Ragnar Lothbrok (Old Norse: Ragnars saga loðbrókar) is one of the most detailed sources about Ragnar's life and exploits. It describes Ragnar's rise to fame, his marriages (including to the shieldmaiden Lagertha and the noblewoman Thora Borgarhjort), and his legendary deeds.

The saga highlights Ragnar's divine connections, particularly his descent from Odin, framing him as a semi-mythical hero blessed with the qualities associated with the Allfather, such as wisdom, courage, and poetic speech. The first account of Ragnar in the saga is the tale of Ragnar killing a dragon, showing the close relation between Ragnar and legendary/magical deeds.

When the Saga accounts Ragnar's death the story also tells "So Ragnar was let down into a serpent-pit, and he sat there a long time while none of the snakes would bite him. And some people said, 'This is a great man; no weapons would bite him today, and now the serpents will not bite him.'"

=== Tale of Ragnar's Sons ===
The Tale of Ragnar's Sons (Old Norse: Ragnarssona þáttr) is a short tale that complements the Saga of Ragnar Lothbrok and focuses on the exploits of Ragnar's sons most notably Ivar the Boneless, Bjorn Ironside, Sigurd Snake-in-the-Eye, and Hvitserk.

The sons are portrayed as avenging their father's death and continuing his legacy. Their divine lineage through Ragnar and their heroic deeds further enhance Ragnar's legendary status.

=== Gesta Danorum by Saxo Grammaticus ===
The Gesta Danorum, written in Latin in the 12th century, this work by the Danish historian Saxo Grammaticus provides one of the earliest accounts of Ragnar and his feats. Saxo portrays Ragnar as a Danish king and warrior, blending historical and mythical elements. While Saxo does not explicitly emphasize Ragnar's descent from Odin, the narrative incorporates divine and heroic motifs that align with Norse tradition.

=== Norse skaldic poetry ===
Poetic references to Ragnar or figures resembling him appear in Norse skaldic poetry and eddic poems, often linking heroes to divine ancestry as a way of enhancing their heroic status. In the "Krákumál," many of the poem's stanzas have Ragnar making claims about Valhalla, Odin and the Valkyrs, showing how Ragnar was closely related with Norse Mythology.

== Ragnar's sons ==
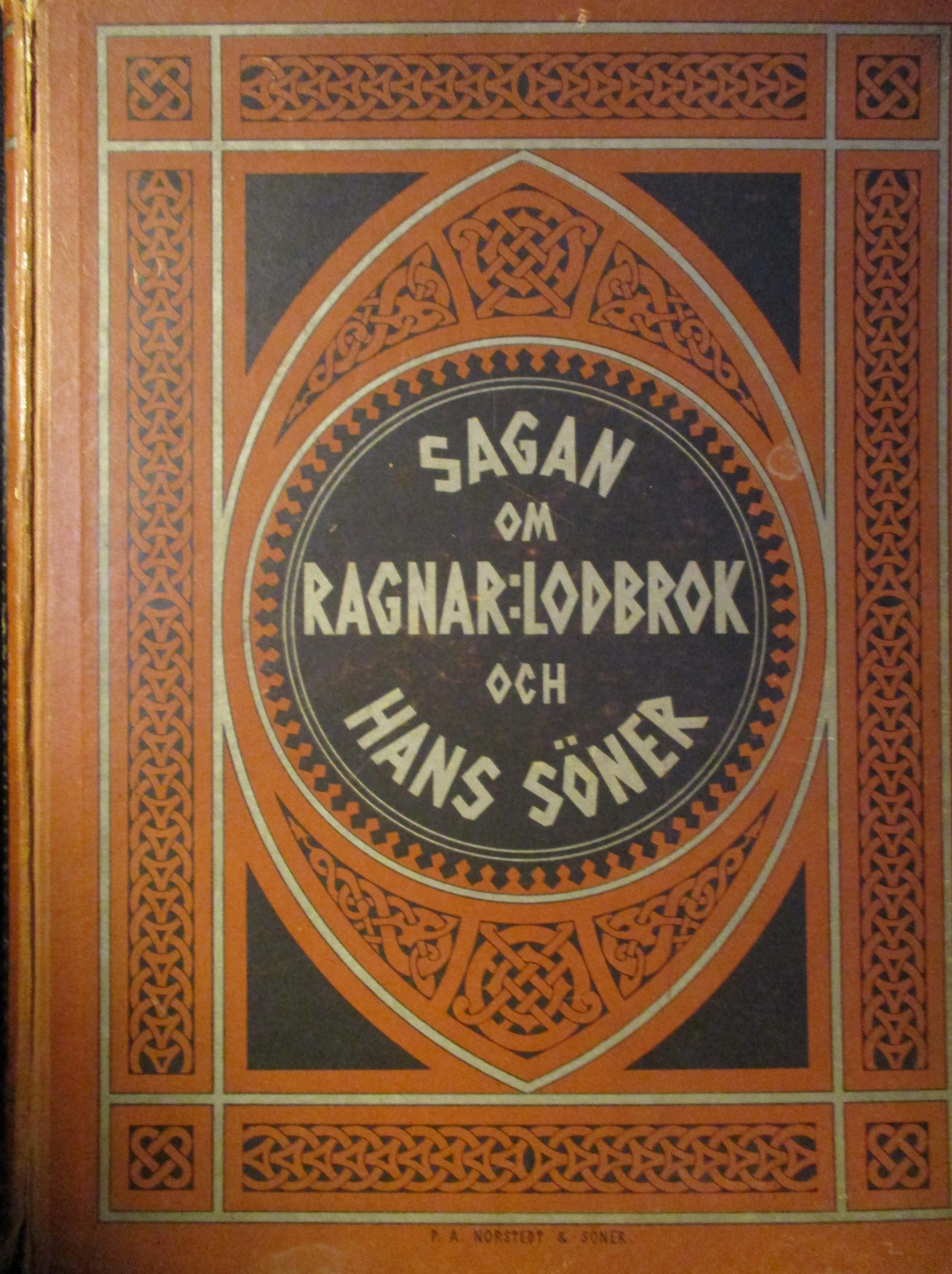
The saga as published by Norstedts in a large-size illustrated version (1880).

The Great Heathen Army is said to have been led by the sons of Ragnar Lodbrok, to wreak revenge against King Ælla of Northumbria who had previously executed Ragnar by casting him into a pit full of venomous snakes. Among the organizers were at least some of the brothers: Ivar the Boneless, Ubba, Halfdan, Björn Ironside, Hvitserk, and Sigurd Snake-in-the-Eye, all of whom are known as historical figures, save the slightly more dubious Hvitserk. Ivar the Boneless was the leader of the Great Heathen Army from 865 to 870, but he disappears from English historical accounts after 870. The Anglo-Saxon chronicler Æthelweard records Ivar's death as 870. Halfdan Ragnarsson became the leader of the Great Heathen Army in about 870 and he led it in an invasion of Wessex. A great number of Viking warriors arrived from Scandinavia, as part of the Great Summer Army, led by King Bagsecg of Denmark, bolstering the ranks of Halfdan's army.

According to the Anglo-Saxon Chronicle, the Danes battled the West Saxons nine times, including the Battle of Ashdown on 8 January 871, where Bagsecg was killed. Halfdan accepted a truce from the future Alfred the Great, newly crowned king of Wessex. After Bagsecg's death, Halfdan was the only remaining king of the invading host. He may also have been a King of part of Denmark (Jutland?), since a co-ruler Halfdan is mentioned in Frankish sources in 873. According to late sagas Björn Ironside became King of Sweden and Uppsala, although this presents chronological inconsistencies. Björn had two sons, Erik and Refil Björnsson. His son Erik became the next king of Sweden, and was succeeded in turn by Erik Refilsson, the son of Refil. Sigurd Snake-in-the-Eye is perhaps the same person as Sigfred, brother of Halfdan, who was king in Denmark together with Halfdan in 873. According to the sagas Sigurd became King of Zealand, Skåne and the lesser Danish Isles. Sigfred-Sigurd possibly succeeded his brother Halfdan as King of entire Denmark in about 877, and may be the Viking king Sigfred who was killed in West Francia in 887.

== Sources and historical accuracy ==
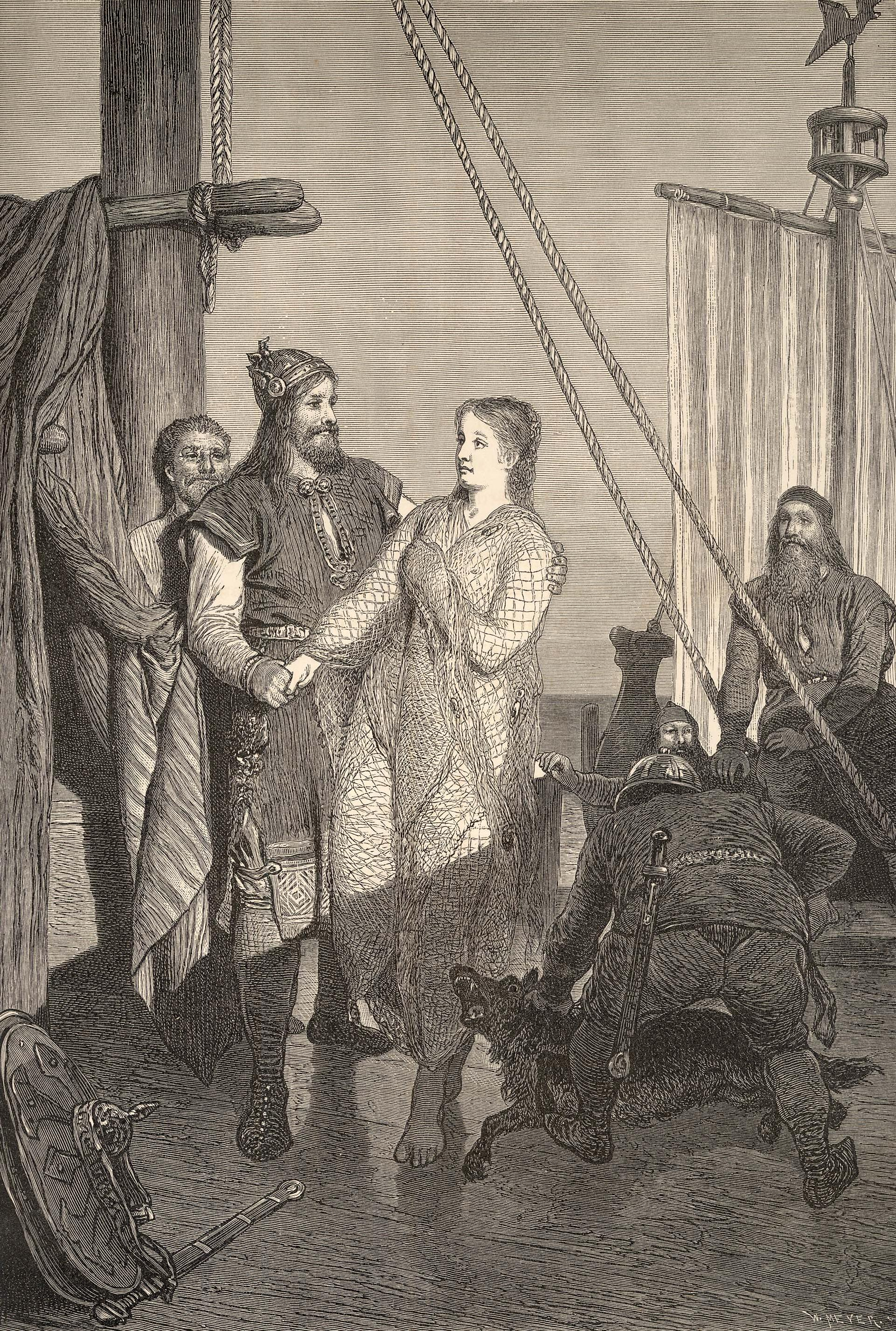
Ragnar receives Kráka (Aslaug), as imagined by August Malmström.

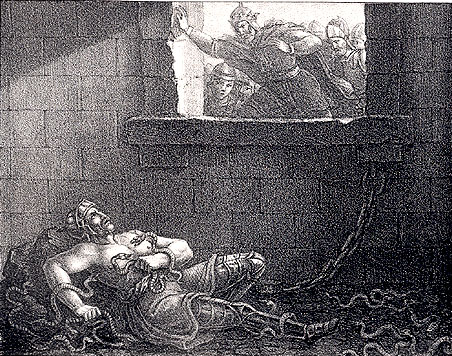
19th-century artist's impression of Ælla of Northumbria's execution of Ragnar Lodbrok

Whereas Ragnar's sons Ivar the Boneless, Halfdan Ragnarsson, Björn Ironside, Ubba and Sigurd Snake-in-the-Eye are historical figures, opinion regarding their father is divided. Contemporary academia regards most of the stories about him to be fiction. According to Hilda Ellis Davidson, writing in 1979, "Certain scholars in recent years have come to accept at least part of Ragnar's story as based on historical fact."

The most significant medieval sources that mention Ragnar include:

- Book IX of the Gesta Danorum, a 12th-century work by the Christian Danish chronicler Saxo Grammaticus
- the Tale of Ragnar's sons (Ragnarssona þáttr), a legendary saga
- the Tale of Ragnar Lodbrok, another saga, a sequel to the Völsunga saga
- the Ragnarsdrápa, a skaldic poem of which only fragments remain, attributed to the 9th-century poet Bragi Boddason
- the Krákumál, Ragnar's death-song, an old and mysterious skaldic poem

In her commentary on Saxo's Gesta Danorum, Davidson notes that Saxo's coverage of Ragnar's legend in book IX of the Gesta appears to be an attempt to consolidate many of the confusing and contradictory events and stories known to the chronicler into the reign of one king, Ragnar. That is why many acts ascribed to Ragnar in the Gesta can be associated, through other sources, with various figures, some of whom are more historically tenable.

The candidates scholars like to associate with the "historical Ragnar" include:

- the Reginherus or Ragnar who besieged Paris in 845
- the Danish King Horik I (d. 854)
- King Reginfrid (d. 814), a king who ruled part of Denmark in tandem with his brother Harald Klak, but was expelled by Horik I and his brothers and later fell in a battle against them
- possibly the Ragnall (Ragnvald or Ragnar) of the Irish Annals

Attempts to reliably associate the legendary Ragnar with one or several of those men have failed because of the difficulty in reconciling the various accounts and their chronology. But the tradition of a Viking hero named Ragnar (or similar) who wreaked havoc in mid-9th-century Europe and who fathered many famous sons is remarkably persistent, and some aspects of it are strengthened by relatively reliable sources, such as Irish historical tradition and, indirectly, the Anglo-Saxon Chronicle.

== In literature and media ==
Ragnar Lodbrok features prominently in the following works:

- Edwin Atherstone's 1830 novel Sea-Kings in England.
- Edison Marshall's 1951 novel The Viking.
- Ragnar le Viking, a 1955 comic book feature written by Jean Ollivier with art by Eduardo Teixeira Coelho, that ran in the French Vaillant magazine up to 1969.
- Richard Parker's 1957 historical novel The Sword of Ganelon explores the character of Ragnar, his sons, and Viking raiding culture.
- The 1958 film The Vikings based on Marshall's novel, in which Ragnar, played by Ernest Borgnine, is captured by King Ælla and cast into a pit of wolves; a son named Einar [sic], played by Kirk Douglas, vows revenge and conquers Northumbria with help from half-brother (and sworn enemy) Eric (played by Tony Curtis), who also had much to avenge upon King Aella.
- Harry Harrison's 1993 alternative history novel The Hammer and the Cross depicts Ragnar being shipwrecked, captured and executed, as well as his sons' revenge.
- History's 2013 TV series Vikings features Australian actor Travis Fimmel playing Ragnar Lodbrok.
- The 2020 release of Ubisoft's Assassin's Creed Valhalla features Ragnar's children continuing to reign, plunder, and settle eastern England during the 9th century. Ragnar himself is briefly seen in a flashback of his execution.

== See also ==
- Uí Ímair
- List of legendary kings of Denmark
- List of legendary kings of Sweden

== Citations ==
Legendary titles
Preceded by Sigurd Ring	King of Sweden in West Norse tradition	Succeeded by Eysteinn Beli
Preceded by Sigurd Ring	King of Denmark	Succeeded by Sigurd Snake-in-the-Eye
Preceded by Siwardus Ring	King of Denmark in Gesta Danorum	Succeeded by Siwardus III
