= Krákumál =

Old Norse poem on the death of Ragnar Lodbrok

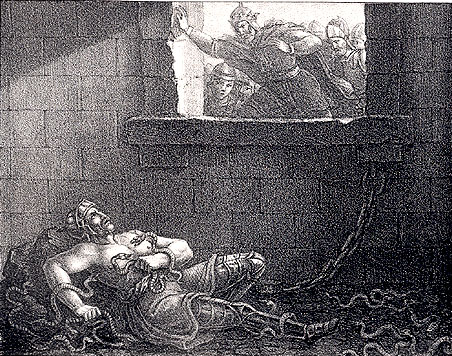
Ragnar Lodbrok during his presentation of Krákumál

Krákumál or the Lay of Kraka is a skaldic poem, consisting of a monologue in which Ragnar Lodbrok is dying in Ælla's snake pit and looks back at a life full of heroic deeds. It was composed in the 12th century, almost certainly in the Scottish islands. It is composed in a kind of háttlausa in 29 stanzas, most of them with ten lines. Thomas Percy was the first to translate the poem into English.

In moving and forceful language, the poem deals with the joys of the life of a warrior, the hope that his death will be followed by a gory revenge, and the knowledge that he will soon know the pleasures of Valhalla.

The poem has been translated into several languages and it has contributed to the modern image of a Viking warrior.

== Sample ==
The following is the text and translation of the first stanza, according to Rory McTurk's 2017 edition:

Hjuggu vér með hjǫrvi.
Hitt var ei fyr lǫngu,
er á Gautlandi gengum
at grafvitnis morði.
Þá fengu vér Þóru;
þaðan hétu mik fyrðar,
þá er ek lyngǫlun lagðak,
Loðbrók, at því vígi.
Stakk ek á storðar lykkju
stáli bjartra mála.

Translation:

We hewed with the sword.
It was not long ago when we set about the slaying of the digging-wolf [SNAKE] in Götaland.
That was when we married Þóra; people have called me Loðbrók (‘Hairy-breeches’)
from the time when I stabbed the heather-fish [SNAKE] to death in that fight.
I thrust the blade with bright ornaments at the loop of the earth [SNAKE].

== In popular culture ==
- In History Channel's drama series Vikings ("All His Angels"), the poem forms the basis for the final words of Ragnar Lothbrok, played by Travis Fimmel. Stanza 23 is read in old norse in the episode "The Best Laid Plans".
- French Nordic neofolk group SKÁLD performed extracts of the poem in their song Krákumál, featured in their 2019 album Vikings Chant.
