= Hvitserk =

Scandinavian warlord during the Viking era

Hvitserk (Hvítserkr, "White-Shirt") was one of the sons of the legendary 9th-century Viking Ragnar Lodbrok and his wife Aslaug.

== Sources ==
Hvitserk is attested to by the Tale of Ragnar's Sons (Ragnarssona þáttr). He is not mentioned in any source that mentions Halfdan Ragnarsson, one of the leaders of the Great Heathen Army that invaded the Kingdom of East Anglia in 867, or vice versa, which consequently led some scholars to suggest that they are the same individual with Hvitserk being only a nickname.

After having avenged his father together with his brothers, he went to Gardarike (Garðaríki). Hvitserk also pillaged with the Rus. He was, however, opposed by such a large foe that he could not win. When asked about how he wished to die, he decided to be burned alive at a stake of human remains.

The Ukrainian historian Leontii Voitovych assumed that Hvitserk was possibly another name of the Kievan prince Askold.

Modern depictions of Hvitserk as a son of Ragnar include History's historical drama television series Vikings, where he features as Ragnar's son by Aslaug (played by Marco Ilsø).
