= Tale of Ragnar Lodbrok =

13th-century Icelandic legendary saga

The Tale of Ragnarr Loðbrók (Old Norse: Ragnars saga loðbrókar) is an Icelandic legendary saga of the 13th century about the Viking ruler Ragnar loðbrók. It is first found in the same manuscript as Vǫlsunga saga, which it immediately follows. The tale covers the origin of Áslaug, Ragnarr's quest for the hand of Þóra borgarhjǫrtr, his later marriage to Áslaug, the deeds of their sons (and Áslaug) in battle, and Ragnarr's death at the hands of king Ælla of Northumbria.

== Summary ==
Ragnarr Loðbrók is a great warrior, son of the Danish king Sigurðr hringr Randvérsson. Ragnarr's first achievement is bravely killing the serpent guarding the beautiful Þóra borgarhjǫrtr. In order to win this battle, Ragnarr wears wolfskin trousers which he has boiled in pitch, hence his name: Old Norse: loðbrók ("hairy trousers"). He then marries Þóra, who, however, dies shortly afterwards. Later, Ragnar sails to Norway, and ends up at the farm called á Spangareiði. There he meets the beautiful Áslaug, known as Kráka, and her foster-mother Gríma. Áslaug is the daughter of Sigurðr Fáfnisbani and Brynhildr, but is in hiding and does not reveal her identity. She accompanies Ragnarr, becomes his concubine, and bears him four sons: Ivarr beinlauss, Bjǫrn járnsíði, Hvítserkr, and Sigurðr Ormr í auga. During a visit to Uppsala with King Eysteinn, Ragnarr is offered marriage to Eysteinn's daughter Ingibjǫrg. The two are betrothed, but when Ragnarr returns home, Áslaug already knows about the betrothal. She now reveals her name and that she was the daughter of Sigurðr Fáfnisbani and Brynhildr. Ragnarr marries her. The breach of promise to Ingibjǫrg leads to war between Ragnarr and King Eysteinn. In this battle, Ragnarr's sons Eiríkr and Agnarr die first, and then King Eysteinn. On a war march in Northumbria, Ragnarr is captured by King Ælla and dies in Ælla's snake pit. Before dying, he sings of his deeds in the poem Krákumál, in which he invokes his sons, who later avenge their father.

== Literary context ==
The saga's sources include Adam of Bremen and Saxo Grammaticus, with whose Gesta Danorum (book IX) it overlaps in the description of Ragnar's pursuit of Thora, his marriage to Aslaug, and the deeds of his sons. Ragnars saga is a sequel of sorts to the Vǫlsunga saga, providing a link between the legendary figures of Sigurðr and Brynhildr and the historical events of the 9th to 11th centuries, as well as prestige to the Norwegian royal house by portraying Sigurðr as its ancestor.

== Editions and translations ==
=== Editions ===
- Altnordische Sagen und Lieder, welche zum Fabelkreise des Heldenbuchs und der Nibelungen gehören, ed. by Friedrich H. von der Hagen (Breslau, 1814)
- Fornaldarsögur Norðurlanda, ed. by Bjarni Vilhjálmsson and Guðni Jónsson (Reykjavík, 1943-44), digitised at Heimskringla.no
- Sýnisbók íslenzkra bókmennta til miðrar átjándu aldar, ed. by Sigurður Nordal, Guðrún P. Helgadóttir, and Jón Jóhannesson (Reykjavík: Bókaverzlun Sigfúsar Eymundssonar, 1953)
- Fornaldar sögur Norðurlanda, ed. by Guðni Jónsson (Reykjavík: Íslendingasagnaútgáfan, 1954-59)
- Ragnars saga loðbrókar, ed. by Uwe Ebel, Texte des Skandinavischen Mittelalters, 4 (Metelen: DEV, 2003)
- Völsunga saga og Ragnars saga loðbrókar, ed. by Örnólfur Thórsson (Reykjavík: Mál og menning, 1985)
- Modern Icelandic spelling edition at Netútgáfan
- 'Anonymous, Krákumál', ed. and trans. by Rory McTurk, in Poetry in fornaldarsögur, ed. by Margaret Clunies Ross, Skaldic Poetry of the Scandinavian Middle Ages, 8 (Turnhout: Brepols, 2017), pp. 706–

=== Translations ===
- Schlauch, Margaret, tr. (1930). "Saga of Ragnar Lodbrok". The saga of the Volsungs: the saga of Ragnar Lodbrok together with the Lay of Kraka. American-Scandinavian Foundation.
- Waggoner, Ben (2009). The Sagas of Ragnar Lodbrok. New Haven, CT: Troth Publications. ISBN 978-0578021386.
- The Saga of the Volsungs: With The Saga of Ragnar Lothbrok, trans. by Jackson Crawford (Indianapolis, IN: Hackett, 2017)

== See also ==
- Ragnar Lodbrok
