= Aslaug =

Figure in Norse mythology

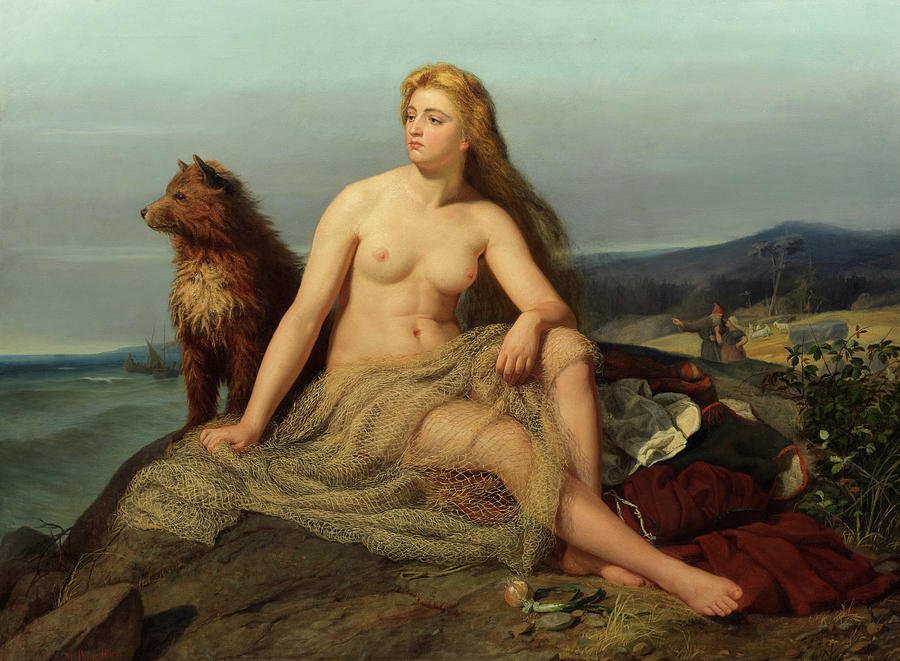
Aslaug by Mårten Eskil Winge (1862)

Aslaug (Old Norse: Áslaug [ˈɑːsˌlɔuɣ]), also called Aslög, Kráka (O.N.: [ˈkrɑːkɑ]) or Kraba, is a figure in Norse mythology who appears in Snorri's Edda, the Völsunga saga and in the saga of Ragnar Lodbrok as one of his wives.

== Aslaug in legend ==
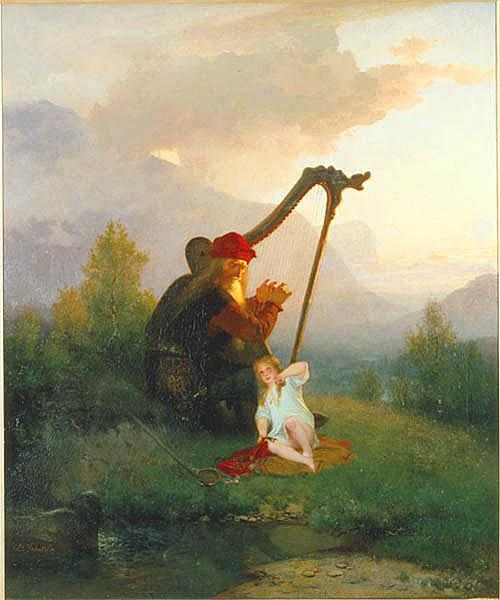
King Heimer and Aslaug. Painting by August Malmström (1856).

According to the 13th-century Tale of Ragnar Lodbrok, Aslaug was the daughter of Sigurd and the shieldmaiden Brynhildr, but was raised by Brynhildr's foster father Heimer. At the deaths of Sigurd and Brynhildr, Heimer was concerned about Aslaug's security, so he made a harp large enough to hide the girl. He then traveled as a poor harp player carrying the harp containing the girl.

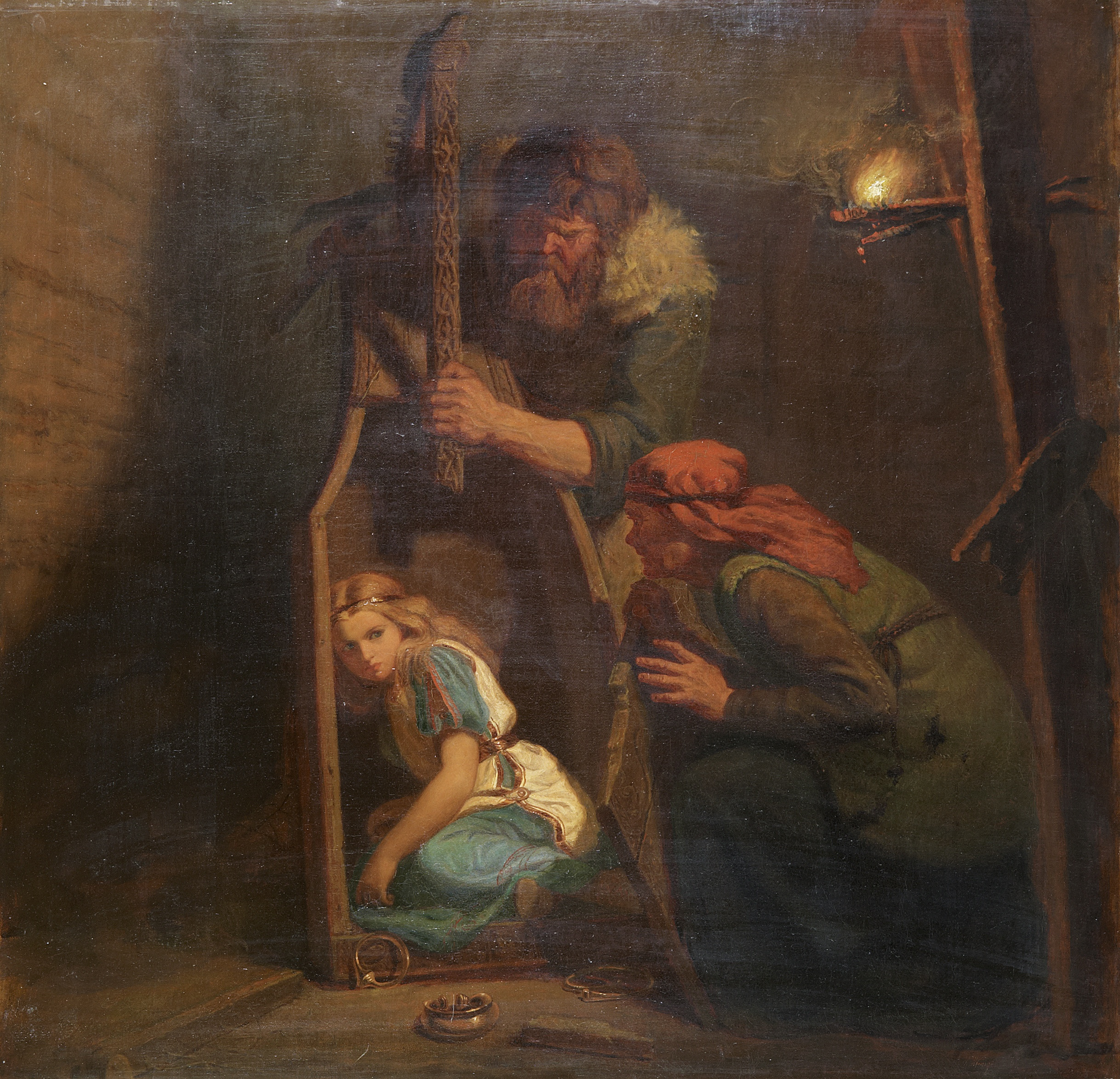
Áke and Grima discover Aslaug. Painting by Mårten Eskil Winge (1862).

They arrived at Spangereid at Lindesnes in Norway, where they stayed for the night in the house of the peasants Áke and Grima. Áke believed the harp contained valuable items and told his wife Grima. Grima then persuaded him to murder Heimer as he was sleeping. However, when they broke the harp open, they discovered a little girl, whom they raised as their own, calling her Kráka ("Crow"). In order to hide her beauty – the accepted sign of her noble origins – they rubbed her in tar and dressed her in a long hood.

However, once as she was bathing, she was discovered by some of the men of the legendary king Ragnar Lodbrok. Entranced by Kráka's beauty, they allowed the bread they were baking to burn; when Ragnar inquired about this mishap, they told him about the girl. Ragnar then sent for her, but in order to test her wits, he commanded her to arrive neither dressed nor undressed, neither fasting nor eating, and neither alone nor in company. Kráka arrived dressed in a net, biting an onion, and with only a dog as a companion. Impressed by her ingenuity and finding her wise, Ragnar proposed marriage to her, which she refused until he had accomplished his mission in Norway.

== Scholarship ==
According to Marilyn Jurich, Aslaug's tale in the Saga of Ragnar Lodbrok is the prototype of the "Clever Peasant Girl" folk tale, Aarne–Thompson No. 875. The saga matches the tale closely up to Aslaug's marriage to Ragnar, but even after that there are similarities: The saga highlights Aslaug's resolve (she refuses sex to Ragnar until after marriage) and her seemingly preternatural wisdom: because Ragnar insists on bedding her immediately after the wedding, contrary to her advice, their first son Ivar was born weak, "boneless".

The Brothers Grimm discuss the similarities of their tale 1815 No. 8 "Die kluge Bauerntochter," with the Nordic tale of Kraka in the appendix entry of the text. They also discuss similarities to a tale in Johannes Pauli's "Schimpf und Ernst" from 1519 to 1522.

== In other fiction ==
The romantic poem "The Fostering of Aslaug" by William Morris is a retelling of Aslaug's relationship with Ragnar, based on the version of the tale in Benjamin Thorpe's Northern Mythology (1851). It is changed in tone and emphasis by Morris' romanticism, excising the saga's more somber and complicated motifs and portraying Ragnar as the typical hero wooing the maiden.

She appears in Friedrich de la Motte Fouqué's "Aslauga's Knight," published in 1810 with two other Icelandic romances as Der Held des Nordens (The Hero of the North).

A principal character in the television series Vikings (2013–2016), played by Alyssa Sutherland, is loosely based on the legend, and introduced to Ragnar in the manner it described.
