= 871 =

Calendar year

871 in various calendars
Gregorian calendar	871; DCCCLXXI
Ab urbe condita	1624
Armenian calendar	320; ԹՎ ՅԻ
Assyrian calendar	5621
Balinese saka calendar	792–793
Bengali calendar	277–278
Berber calendar	1821
Buddhist calendar	1415
Burmese calendar	233
Byzantine calendar	6379–6380
Chinese calendar	庚寅年 (Metal Tiger); 3568 or 3361 — to — 辛卯年 (Metal Rabbit); 3569 or 3362
Coptic calendar	587–588
Discordian calendar	2037
Ethiopian calendar	863–864
Hebrew calendar	4631–4632
- Hindu calendars
Vikram Samvat	927–928
Shaka Samvat	792–793
Kali Yuga	3971–3972
Holocene calendar	10871
Iranian calendar	249–250
Islamic calendar	257–258
Japanese calendar	Jōgan 13 (貞観１３年)
Javanese calendar	768–770
Julian calendar	871; DCCCLXXI
Korean calendar	3204
Minguo calendar	1041 before ROC 民前1041年
Nanakshahi calendar	−597
Seleucid era	1182/1183 AG
Thai solar calendar	1413–1414
Tibetan calendar	ལྕགས་ཕོ་སྟག་ལོ་ (male Iron-Tiger); 997 or 616 or −156 — to — ལྕགས་མོ་ཡོས་ལོ་ (female Iron-Hare); 998 or 617 or −155

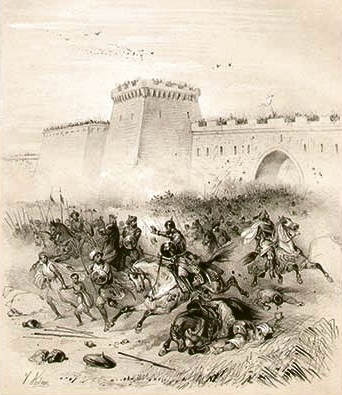
Emperor Louis II of Italy captures Bari (871)

Year 871 (DCCCLXXI) was a common year starting on Monday of the Julian calendar.

== Events ==
=== By place ===
==== Europe ====
- The English retreat onto the Berkshire Downs. The Great Heathen Army, led by the Danish Viking kings Halfdan and Bagsecg, march out after the Saxons. Six pitched battles are fought between the Danes and Wessex. Of two of them the place and date are not recorded, the others are:
  - January 4 – Battle of Reading: A West Saxon force, under the command of King Æthelred I and his brother Alfred, is defeated by the Danes at Reading. Among the many dead on both sides is Æthelwulf. The Saxon troops are forced to retreat, allowing the Vikings to continue their advance into Wessex.
  - January 8 – Battle of Ashdown: The West Saxons, led by Æthelred I and Alfred, gather at the Berkshire Downs. The Danes under the command of Halfdan and Bagsecg occupy the high ground, but are successfully attacked by Alfred's men. During the battle Alfred breaches the shield wall formation.
  - January 22 – Battle of Basing: The West Saxon army, under the command of Æthelred I, is defeated at Basing. The Danes, led by Halfdan, are victorious; Æthelred is forced to flee and regroup, leaving behind precious winter supplies.
  - March 22 – Battle of Meretum: The West Saxons, led by Æthelred I and Alfred, are defeated by the Danes. Among the many dead is Heahmund, bishop of Salisbury.
  - May – Battle of Wilton: Alfred the Great is defeated by the Danes at Wilton (along the southern side of the River Wylye), leaving him in retreat for several years.
- February 2 – Franco-Lombard forces, aided by a Croatian fleet (of Sclaveni), led by Emperor Louis II, capture Bari, capital of the Emirate of Bari in Southern Italy.
- April 23 – Alfred succeeds as king of Wessex after Æthelred's death. He makes peace with the Danes, and pays them Danegeld, each ruling parts of England.
- Alfred makes Winchester his residence. The Danish armies colonize areas of north, central and eastern England, which become known as the Danelaw.
- The Danes sail down the River Thames, to raid the Mercian port of Lundenwic (in the London area). Here, over the winter, they divide their spoils.
- King Rhodri Mawr ("the Great") of Gwynedd annexes Seisyllwg, uniting most of Wales under his rule (approximate date).
- Tønsberg, the oldest surviving town in the Nordic countries, is founded.

==== Arabian Empire ====
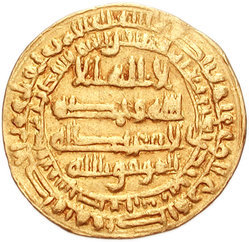
Abbasid Gold dinar under al-Mu'tamid, caliph

- September – Battle of Basra: Zanj rebels in Mesopotamia sack and capture Basra (see Zanj Rebellion).

=== By topic ===
==== Literature ====
- The Cairo Genizah, a collection of Jewish manuscript fragments, is written (approximate date).

== Births ==
- Abu Bakr Muhammad ibn Ali al-Madhara'i, Tulunid vizier (d. 957)
- Fujiwara no Tokihira, Japanese statesman (d. 909)
- García I, king of León (approximate date)
- Li Qi, chancellor of Later Liang (d. 930)
- Wang Jianli, Chinese general (d. 940)

== Deaths ==
- January 4 – Æthelwulf, Saxon ealdorman
- January 8 – Bagsecg, Viking king
- April 23 – Æthelred I, king of Wessex
- June 10 – Odo I, Frankish nobleman
- Ailill mac Dúnlainge, king of Leinster
- Cathalán mac Indrechtaig, king of Ulaid
- Dae Geonhwang, king of Balhae
- Engelschalk I, Frankish margrave
- Fadl Ashsha'ira, Abbasid female poet
- Heahmund, bishop of Salisbury
- Hunfrid, bishop of Thérouanne
- Ibn 'Abd al-Hakam, Muslim historian (b. 803)
- Solomon I, bishop of Constance
- Uathmharan mac Brocan, king of Aidhne (Ireland)
- William II, Frankish margrave
- Yahya ibn Mu'adh al-Razi, Muslim Sufi (b. 830)
