= 870 =

Calendar year

870 in various calendars
- Gregorian calendar: 870; DCCCLXX
- Ab urbe condita: 1623
- Armenian calendar: 319; ԹՎ ՅԺԹ
- Assyrian calendar: 5620
- Balinese saka calendar: 791–792
- Bengali calendar: 276–277
- Berber calendar: 1820
- Buddhist calendar: 1414
- Burmese calendar: 232
- Byzantine calendar: 6378–6379
- Chinese calendar: 己丑年 (Earth Ox); 3567 or 3360 — to — 庚寅年 (Metal Tiger); 3568 or 3361
- Coptic calendar: 586–587
- Discordian calendar: 2036
- Ethiopian calendar: 862–863
- Hebrew calendar: 4630–4631
- Hindu calendars
- Vikram Samvat: 926–927
- Shaka Samvat: 791–792
- Kali Yuga: 3970–3971
- Holocene calendar: 10870
- Iranian calendar: 248–249
- Islamic calendar: 256–257
- Japanese calendar: Jōgan 12 (貞観１２年)
- Javanese calendar: 767–768
- Julian calendar: 870; DCCCLXX
- Korean calendar: 3203
- Minguo calendar: 1042 before ROC 民前1042年
- Nanakshahi calendar: −598
- Seleucid era: 1181/1182 AG
- Thai solar calendar: 1412–1413
- Tibetan calendar: ས་མོ་གླང་ལོ་ (female Earth-Ox); 996 or 615 or −157 — to — ལྕགས་ཕོ་སྟག་ལོ་ (male Iron-Tiger); 997 or 616 or −156

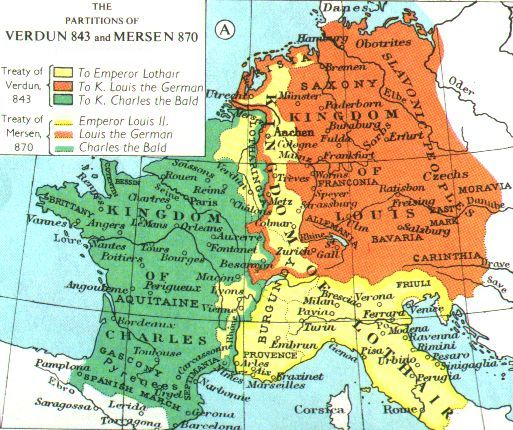
Division after the Treaty of Meerssen (870)

Year 870 (DCCCLXX) was a common year starting on Sunday of the Julian calendar, the 870th year of the Common Era (CE) and Anno Domini (AD) designations, the 870th year of the 1st millennium, the 70th year of the 9th century, and the 1st year of the 870s decade.

== Events ==
=== By place ===
==== Europe ====
- August 8 – Treaty of Meerssen: King Louis the German forces his half-brother Charles the Bald to accept a peace treaty, which partitions the Middle Frankish Kingdom into two larger east and west divisions. Louis receives most of Austrasia (which evolves into the Kingdom of Germany), and Charles receives territory in Lower Burgundy (which evolves into the Kingdom of France). However, large parts of the Frisian coast are under Viking control.
- Charles the Bald marries Richilde of Provence, after the death of his first wife, Ermentrude of Orleans. He intends to secure his rule in Lotharingia through the powerful Bosonid family and the connection to Teutberga, widow-queen of Lothair II.
- Rastislav, ruler (knyaz) of Great Moravia, dies in prison after he is condemned to death for treason, by Louis the German. He is succeeded by his nephew Svatopluk I, who becomes a vassal of the East Frankish Kingdom.
- Bořivoj I, duke of Bohemia, makes Levý Hradec (modern Czech Republic) his residence. Around this time Prague Castle is founded (approximate date).
- Wilfred the Hairy, a Frankish nobleman, becomes count of Urgell and Cerdanya (modern-day Catalonia).

==== Britain ====
- Autumn – The Great Heathen Army, led by Ivar the Boneless and Ubba, invades East Anglia and plunders Peterborough. King Edmund the Martyr is captured, tortured, beaten and used for archery practice (or 869).
- The Danes, led by Ivar the Boneless and King Olaf of the Dublin Vikings, besiege Dumbarton in Scotland, the capital of King Artgal of Stratchlyde. After a siege of four months, the citadel is captured and destroyed.
- The Danes, led by Halfdan Ragnarsson and Bagsecg, invade Wessex and take the royal estate at Reading (Berkshire), which Halfdan makes his headquarters. A naval Viking contingent sails up the Thames River.
- December 31 – Battle of Englefield: The Vikings clash with ealdorman Æthelwulf of Berkshire. The invaders are driven back to Reading; many of the Danes (including one of the earls named Sidrac) are killed.

==== Abbasid Caliphate ====
- January 29 – Anarchy at Samarra: The rebel Salih ibn Wasif is hunted down and killed in Abbasid Samarra by troops of Musa ibn Bugha al-Kabir.
- June 21 – Caliph Al-Muhtadi is deposed and killed by the Turks, after a brief reign. He is succeeded by Al-Mu'tamid (son of the late Al-Mutawakkil) as ruler of the Abbasid Caliphate, who moves his court to Baghdad. End of the Anarchy at Samarra.
- Byzantine–Arab War: A Muslim expeditionary force, led by Halaf al-Hadim, Arab governor of Sicily, conquers Malta. He is welcomed by the local Christian inhabitants as liberator of the agonizing Byzantine yoke. The Muslims sign a treaty with the Christians to live in peace after liberating the island from the Byzantines.
- The Zanj Rebellion: The Zanj (black slaves from East Africa) capture the Abbasid seaport of Al-Ubullah at the Persian Gulf, and cut off communications with Basra (modern Iraq).

=== By topic ===
==== Religion ====
- February 28 – The Fourth Council of Constantinople ends. The Bulgarians are granted an autocephalous archbishopric. with its seat in the capital of Pliska.

== Births ==
- Æthelflæd, lady ruler of Mercia (d. 918)
- Alexander III, Byzantine emperor (d. 913)
- Bernard, illegitimate son of Charles the Fat (d. 891)
- Ebalus, duke of Aquitaine (approximate date)
- Ermengol, Frankish nobleman (d. 937)
- Fulk I, Frankish nobleman (approximate date)
- Lde-dpal-hkhor-btsan, Indian ruler (approximate date)
- Pavle, prince of Serbia (approximate date)
- Petar, prince of Serbia (approximate date)
- Romanos I, Byzantine emperor (d. 948)
- Sunifred II, count of Urgell (approximate date)
- Sunyer, count of Barcelona (approximate date)
- Theodora, Roman politician (approximate date)
- Wang Dingbao, Chinese chancellor (d. 941)
- Zhu Yanshou, Chinese governor (d. 903)
- Zwentibold, king of Lotharingia (d. 900)

== Deaths ==
- January 29 – Salih ibn Wasif, Muslim general
- February 4 – Ceolnoth, archbishop of Canterbury
- April 2 – Æbbe the Younger, Frankish abbess
- June 21 – Al-Muhtadi, Muslim caliph
- September 1 – Muhammad al-Bukhari, Persian scholar (b. 810)
- November 20 – Edmund the Martyr, king of East Anglia (or 869)
- December 4 – Suairlech ind Eidnén mac Ciaráin, Irish bishop
- December 27 – Aeneas of Paris, Frankish bishop
- Adarnase II, Georgian Bagratid prince (approximate date)
- Al-Harith ibn Sima al-Sharabi, Muslim governor
- Al-Zubayr ibn Bakkar, Muslim historian (b. 788)
- Caesar of Naples ("the Brave"), Italian admiral
- Gregory III, co-regent and duke of Naples
- He Quanhao, general of the Tang Dynasty (b. 839)
- Neot, English monk and saint (approximate date)
- Rastislav, ruler (knyaz) of Great Moravia
- Ratramnus, Frankish monk and abbot (approximate date)
- Wen Tingyun, Chinese poet and lyricist (b. 812)
