= Bagsecg =

Viking king and leader of the Great Army

King (probably from Denmark)
- Reign: c.860s–871 AD
- Successor: Halfdan Ragnarsson
- Died: approx. 8 January 871; Ashdown, England
- Religion: Norse religion

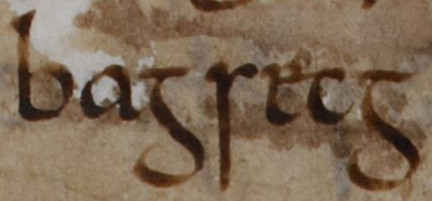
Bagsecg's name as it appears on folio 131r of British Library Cotton Tiberius B I (the "C" version of the Anglo-Saxon Chronicle): "Bagsecg".

Bagsecg (d. c.8 January 871), also known as Bacgsecg, was a viking and a leader of the Great Army, which invaded England. According to the Anglo-Saxon Chronicle, Bagsecg and Healfdene (Norse Hálfdan) were "heathen kings" (hæþnan cyningas) and joint commanders of the Great Army that invaded the Kingdom of Wessex during the northern winter of 870/71.

The Great Army is recorded as setting up camp at Reading and fighting the forces of Æthelred, King of Wessex, in several engagements during 871. At one of these, the Battle of Ashdown, Bagsecg and five Viking earls were killed.

After Bagsecg's death, Healfdene seems to have become the sole leader of the Great Army. He was the principal leader when the vikings overwintered in London in 871/72. In addition, three other viking kings had emerged by 875 (according to the Anglo-Saxon Chronicle); some of these may have been elevated to kingly status as a consequence of Bagsecg's demise.

During the 18th and 19th centuries, Bagsecg was erroneously associated with Wayland's Smithy, a Neolithic long barrow in south Oxfordshire. A folk legend arose that the barrow was his tomb or a memorial to Bagsecg. Likewise, other prehistoric sites in south central England, such as the Seven Barrows, have been erroneously regarded as memorials to those who fell at the Battle of Ashdown.

== Origins and Name ==
Bagsecg's origins are obscure. He is one of the first Vikings to be named by the Anglo-Saxon Chronicle. He and Healfdene are the first principal Viking leaders attested by all versions of this source, after the Great Army's arrival in Wessex. (Note: The earliest source to make note of Ingware in the context of the Great Army's invasion of Anglo-Saxon England is Chronicon Æthelweardi. Many of the earliest vikings attested by the Anglo-Saxon Chronicle are those that lost recorded battles or died in them. Such is certainly the case in Irish sources. The 15th/16th century Annals of Ulster, for example, reports the deaths of Saxolb, Tuirgéis, Agonn, and Tomrair in the 830s and 840s, before naming the first living Viking, Stain, in the 850s. The fact that Ingware is not noted by the Anglo-Saxon Chronicle until after his death may be related to the fact that he did not suffer any defeats against the Anglo-Saxons, and never fought against the West Saxons.) Nothing further is known regarding Bagsecg's background.

The precise historical phonology and etymology of the name Bagsecg are also obscure. It appears only in sources relating to this particular historical individual, in England during the 9th century. (By comparison, Healfdene clearly corresponds to the relatively common Old Norse name Halfdan meaning "half Dane".) Surviving sources give many differing forms of Bagsecg's name. The "A" version of the Anglo-Saxon Chronicle gives "Bachsecg" and "Bagsecg"; the "B" version gives "Bagsceg"; the "C" version gives "Bagsecg"; the "D" version gives "Bagsecg"; the "E" version gives "Bagsecg" and "Basecg"; the "F" version gives "Bagsæc" and "Bagsec"; and the "G" version gives "Bachsecg". The edition of Vita Alfredi preserved by Cambridge Corpus Christi College (100) gives "Bægscecg"; the edition preserved by British Library (Cotton Otho A xii) gives "Beagstecg"; and the edition of preserved by Cambridge University Library (Additional 3825) gives "Beagscecg". One late 10th century source, the Latin Chronicon Æthelweardi, varies notably, in that it records the name as Berse. Although this name is unattested by the Anglo-Saxon Chronicle, forms of it are recorded by the Durham Liber vitae, and it appears to represent the Old Norse Bersi, a name otherwise uncommon in Anglo-Saxon England. (Subsequent sources revert to the more conventional forms in Anglo-Saxon. The account of the 12th century Chronicon ex chronicis gives "Bagsecg". The 12th century Annals of St Neots gives "Beagsecg".)

== The Great Army ==
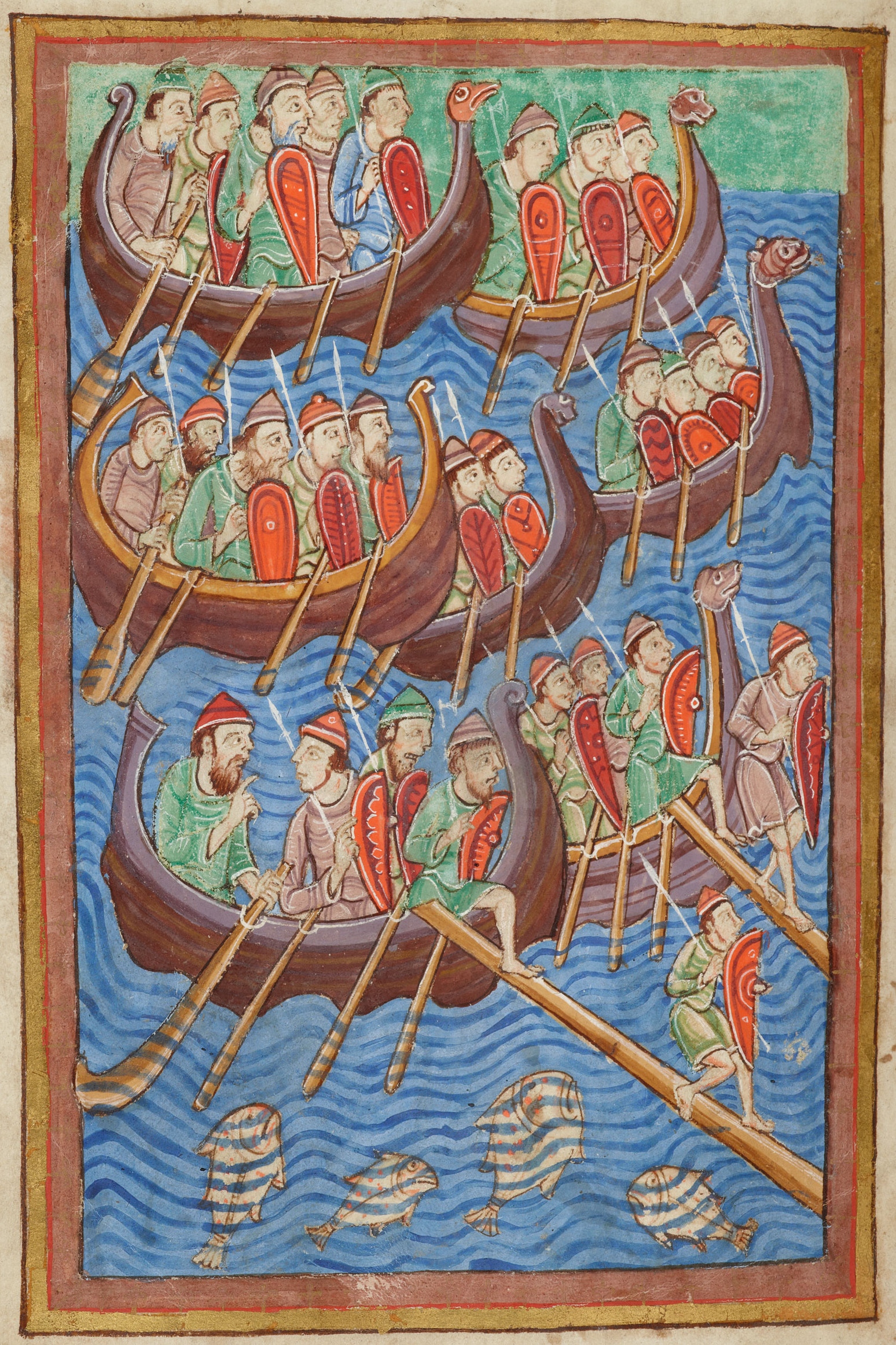
A 12 century depiction of the invading vikings on folio 9v of Pierpont Morgan Library M.736.

There is a historical consensus that an invading viking army coalesced in Anglo-Saxon England, during the 860s. The "A version" of the Anglo-Saxon Chronicle – dating from the 9th or 10th century – describes the invading force as the "micel here", an Old English term that can translate as "big army", or "great army". (Note: The earliest form of the Anglo-Saxon Chronicle is the "A" version. Another Old English name "mycel hæðen here", meaning "great heathen raiding-army", appears in later versions of the Chronicle.)

Contemporary sources make mutually-contradictory claims regarding the origins of the Great Army. The Anglo-Saxon Chronicle usually identifies the Vikings simply as "Danes" or "heathens". The 10th century Vita Alfredi seems to allege that the invaders came specifically from Denmark. However, a more general Scandinavian origin may be evident in the Chronicon Æthelweardi (late 10th century), which states that "the fleets of the tyrant Ingware (Norse Ivár) arrived in England from the north". The documentary evidence as a whole, and modern archaeological research, suggests that the Great Army was not a homogeneous force, but a composite of warbands from different parts of Scandinavia (and possibly other parts of Europe).

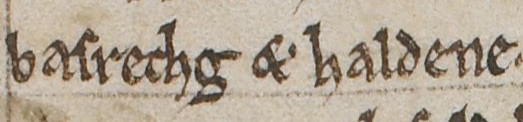
The names of Bagsecg and Healfdene as they appear on folio 6r of British Library Cotton Faustina B IX (the Chronicle of Melrose): "Basrechg".

The leadership of the Great Army appears to have fallen to Bagsecg and Healfdene after the departure from England, or death, of Ingware, the foremost leader of the Great Army and one of the vikings most prominent in 9th century Britain. In 869, the vikings claimed a pivotal victory, when Edmund, King of East Anglia was killed and the entire Kingdom of East Anglia was captured. It may have been at about this date that Ingware either died or moved on to campaign in the Western Isles, the Scottish mainland or Ireland. Chronicon Æthelweardi states that Ingware died in the same year as Edmund. (While there is reason to believe that Ingware is identical to Ímar, a Viking king later active in Ireland and Scotland, such an identification has never achieved consensus.)

== Invasion of Wessex ==
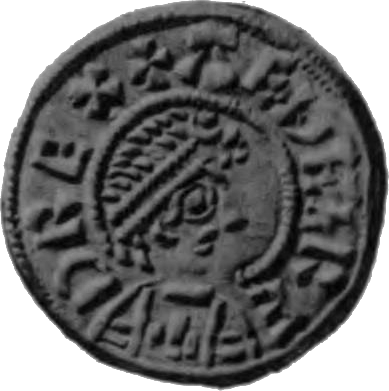
A coin of Æthelred, King of Wessex.

With the capitulation of the East Angles, the Vikings turned their attention towards the Kingdom of Wessex. This was the final Anglo-Saxon realm to withstand the Vikings, which could indicate that the latter sought to isolate the West Saxons before committing to a fullscale invasion. Late in 870, the Great Army arrived at Reading on the banks of the River Thames. There is reason to suspect that this seizure of Reading could have been timed to coincide with Christmas. In any case, the Anglo-Saxon Chronicle reports that the Vikings fought nine battles with the West Saxons in the following months, and elaborates on six of these. Vita Alfredi lists eight such engagements, elaborating on only four.

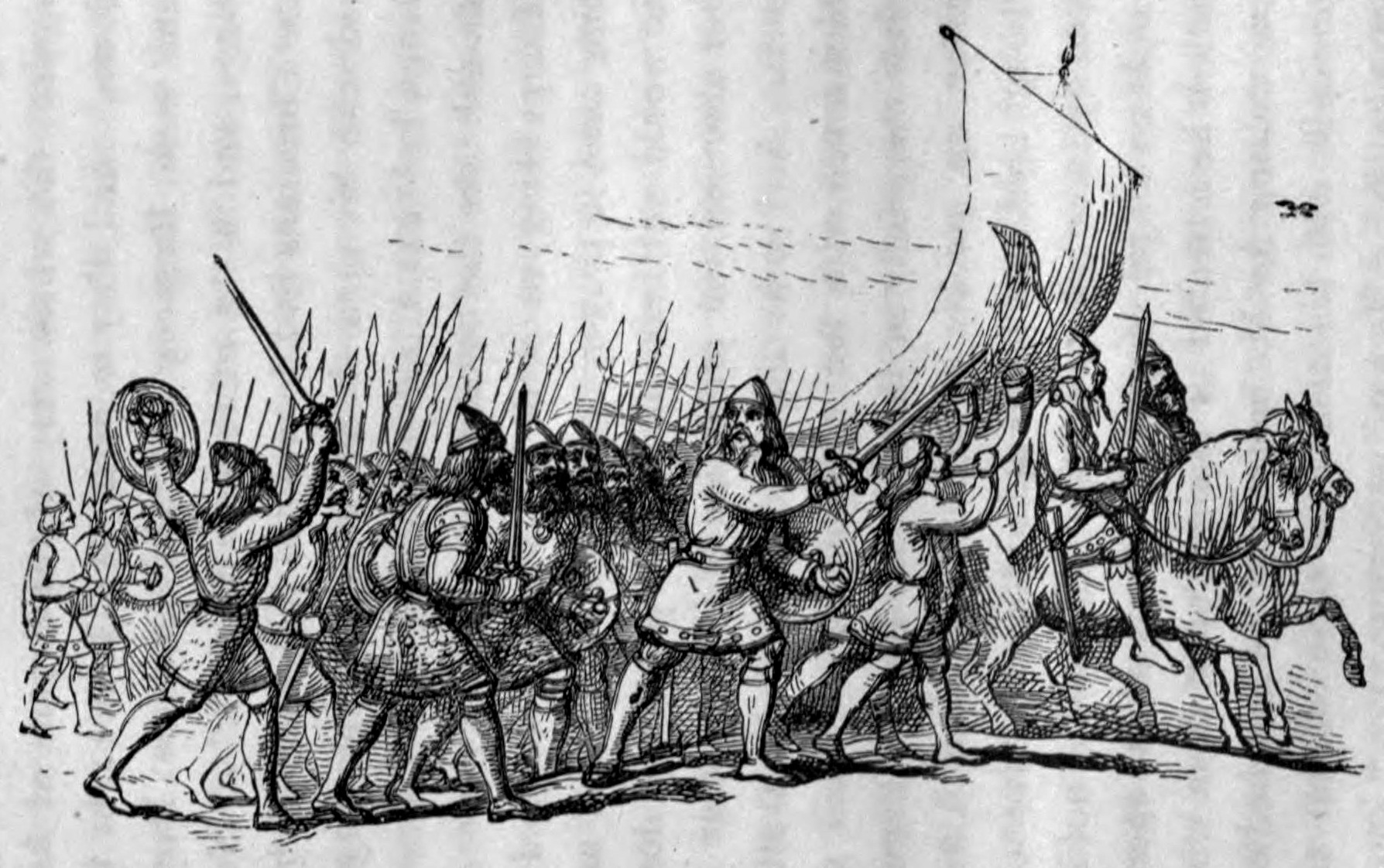
A nineteenth-century depiction of the Vikings that invaded the Kingdom of Wessex.

Not long after having encamped at Reading, the Great Army appears to have divided, with part of it striking out into Wessex. One of the recorded engagements between Vikings and West Saxons was the Battle of Englefield, in which Æthelwulf, Ealdorman of Berkshire defeated a party of invaders led by several earls. It is possible that this conflict took place in the context of Bagsecg and Healfdene having the earls ride forth from Reading to forage, raid, and reconnoitre. In any case, four days later, the Vikings and West Saxons again clashed. This time, the West Saxons confronted the Vikings at Reading, and were led by Æthelred, King of Wessex, and his younger brother, Alfred. The Battle of Reading ended in defeat for the West Saxons.

== Battle of Ashdown ==
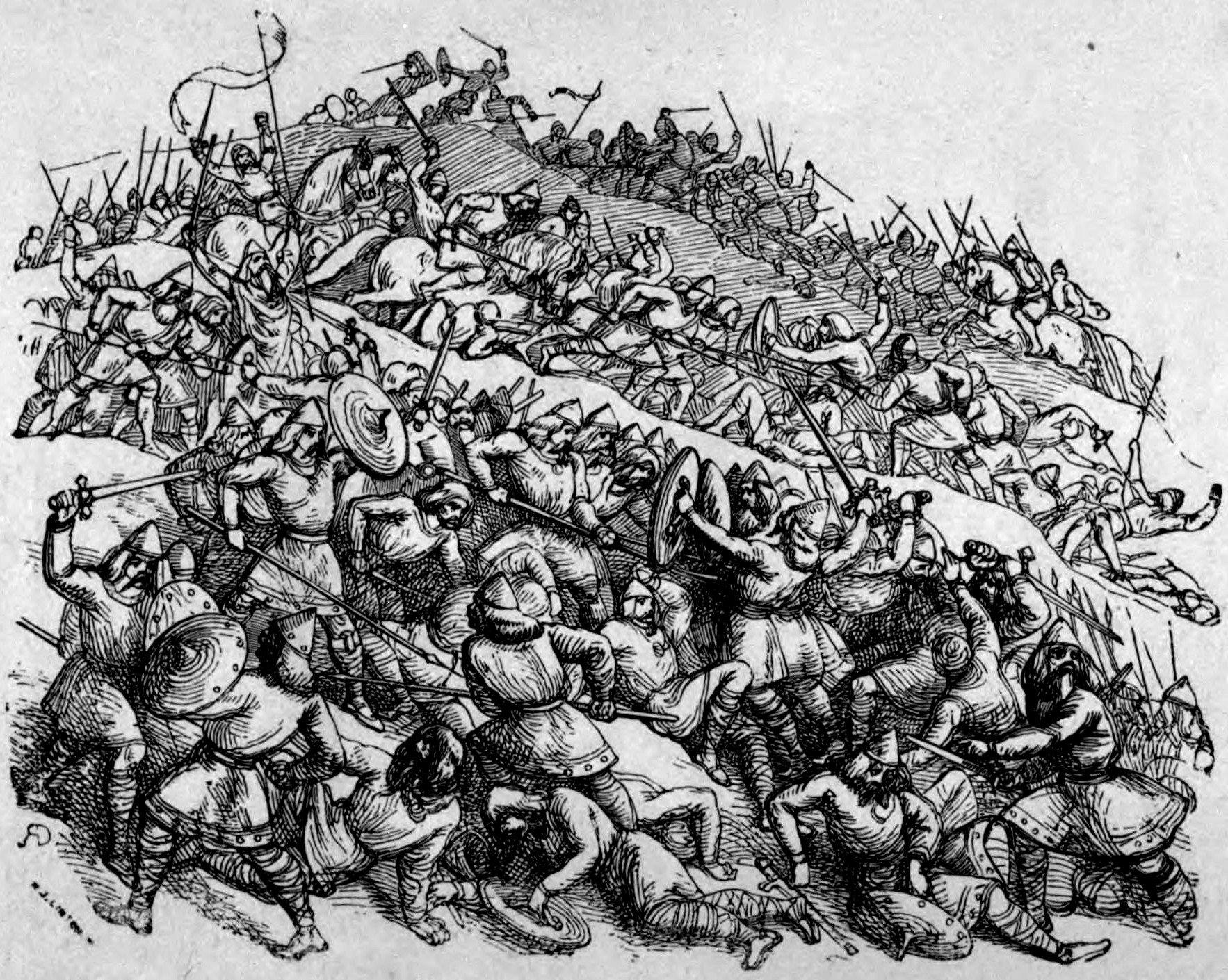
A nineteenth-century depiction of the Battle of Ashdown.

Four days after the disaster at Reading, on about 8 January 871, the West Saxons intercepted a massed force of Vikings at the Battle of Ashdown, fought somewhere in the Berkshire Downs. (Note: Vita Alfredi states that the battle was fought at Ashdown (Æscedun), which could refer to the whole of the Berkshire Downs.) According to Vita Alfredi, the West Saxons were "aroused by grief and shame" to meet the Vikings in battle. It is uncertain what motivated the Vikings to meet their opponents in the open ground. One possibility is that the Vikings' recent victory at Reading had emboldened them to the extent that they intended to destroy the demoralised West Saxon army once and for all.

Surviving sources give differing accounts of the conflict. According to the Anglo-Saxon Chronicle, Æthelred fought the division of Vikings commanded by two kings, Bagsecg and Healfdene, whilst Alfred fought the division led by several earls, including Sidroc the Old, Sidroc the Young, Osbern, Fræna, and Harold. According to this source, thousands of men were slain in the encounter, including Bagsecg and the five named earls. (Note: The Anglo-Saxon Chronicle describes Bagsecg and Healfdene as heathen kings, which suggests that some of the army were also pagans. Nevertheless, the term is not employed again by this source until 942, when it is attested within the poem The Capture of the Five Boroughs, preserved by the "A", 'B", "C", and "D" versions of the chronicle. According to some versions of the Anglo-Saxon Chronicle, an earl named Sidroc was slain at the Battle of Englefield. The "A" and "F" versions of this source do not name him. Although Vita Alfredi mentions the earl, he is not named by this particular source. Whilst it is possible that a man by the name indeed fought at Englefield, the record of his demise in this conflict may be confused, and may actually refer to the Battle of Ashdown, in which two earls of the same name (Sidroc the Old and Sidroc the Young) certainly did perish. The accounts of the Battle of Ashdown are the first historical sources to make note of Healfdene. According to an unreliable account of events preserved by the twelfth-century Liber Eliensis, Ubba was one of the Vikings leaders slain in the battle.) The account of events preserved by Chronicon Æthelweardi, as well as that dictated by Vita Alfredi, corroborate the identities of the Viking leadership, and reveal that the battle was particularly large, and particularly bloody, with thousands of casualties. (Note: There is little evidence concerning the organisational structure of the Great Army. Although the Vikings at the Battle of Ashdown appear to have fought in two divisions—with one led by Bagsecg and Healfdene, and the other led by the earls—nothing further is known of the command arrangement. There is reason to suspect that, in comparison to their Anglo-Saxon counterparts, Viking leaders generally had fewer resources to reward their followers. This could mean that ninth-century Viking commanders possessed personal retinues of a single ship. If such was the case at the Battle of Ashdown, with the kings and earls commanding about forty personal followers apiece, the Viking forces would have numbered at least about three hundred men.)

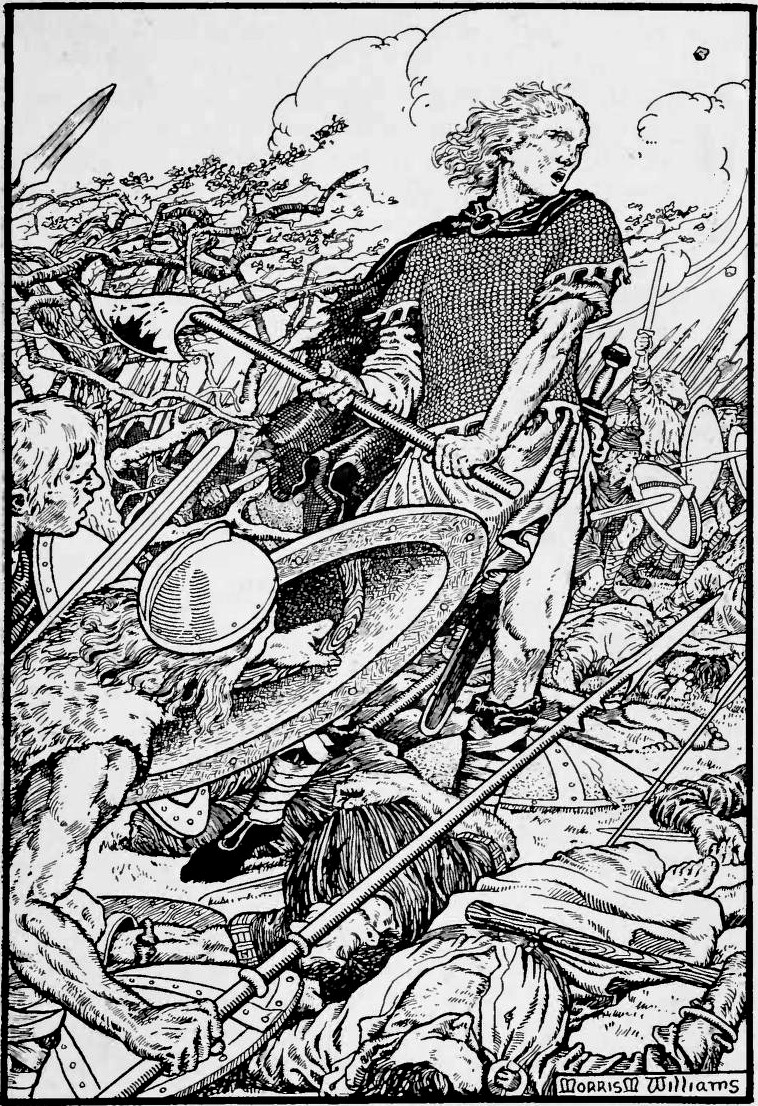
An early twentieth-century depiction of Alfred, younger brother of Æthelred, at the Battle of Ashdown.

The Anglo-Saxon Chronicle relates that fighting continued on into the night, suggesting that the West-Saxons indeed won a bloody and drawn-out affair. According to Vita Alfredi, the Viking dead were dispersed "over the whole broad expanse of Ashdown, scattered everywhere, far and wide". Although the Anglo-Saxon Chronicle and Chronicon Æthelweardi claim that the West Saxons fought the entire Great Army, it is unlikely that the Vikings left their encampment at Reading unprotected. Nevertheless, the various accounts suggest that there were many more Viking combatants at the Battle of Ashdown than at the Battle of Englefield, and probably more than at the Battle of Reading.

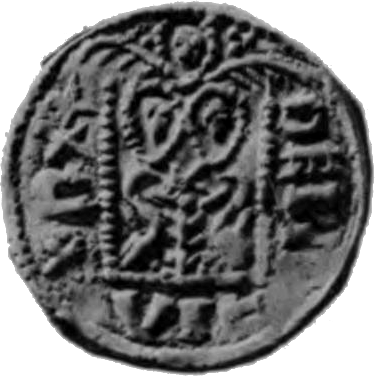
A coin that could date to Healfdene's occupation of London. The possibility that Healfdene minted coins in London would reveal that he was the principal leader of the Great Army following Bagsecg's demise. (Note: Nevertheless, it is uncertain if Healfdene minted coins. The so-called "Two Emperors" and "London Monogram" types that bear his name could actually refer to a later like-named Viking ruler. If so, one possibility is that this man is identical to the Healfdene slain at the Battle of Tettenhall in 910.)

Despite the contradictory accounts of the conflict, the sources are united in portraying the battle as a resounding success for the West Saxons. Nevertheless, there is reason to suspect that the accounts have somewhat exaggerated the outcome, and that it could have been a more of a Pyrrhic victory. Certainly, Healfdene led the Vikings to a victory over the West Saxons at the Battle of Basing two weeks later, and again at the Battle of Meretun two months after that. (Note: The specific dates of the battles are unrecorded, although the Anglo-Saxon Chronicle gives precise spans of time between most of them. For example: the Battle of Reading is stated to have taken place four days after the Battle of Englefield; the Battle of Ashdown four days after that; the Battle of Basing fourteen days after that; and the Battle of Meretun two months after that. One of the West Saxons slain in the latter conflict was Heahmund, Bishop of Sherborne. The fact that Heahmund is assigned the date 22 March by English martyrologies could indicate that this was the day of his demise. If correct, the battles can be assigned the following dates: the Battle of Englefield on 31 December 870; the Battle of Reading on 4 January 871; the Battle of Ashdown on 8 January 871; the Battle of Basing on 22 January 871; and the Battle of Mereton on 22 March 871.) Æthelred died not long after Easter, possibly from wounds suffered in one of the conflicts, after which Alfred succeeded to the kingship. About a month later, Alfred struck out at the Vikings, but was again defeated by Healfdene at the Battle of Wilton. According to Chronicon Æthelweardi, the West Saxons "made peace" with the Vikings—a statement echoed by the Anglo-Saxon Chronicle and Vita Alfredi—indicating that the West Saxons purchased a cessation of violence. The Vikings thereafter left Wessex and based themselves in London, where the Mercians also bought their peace.

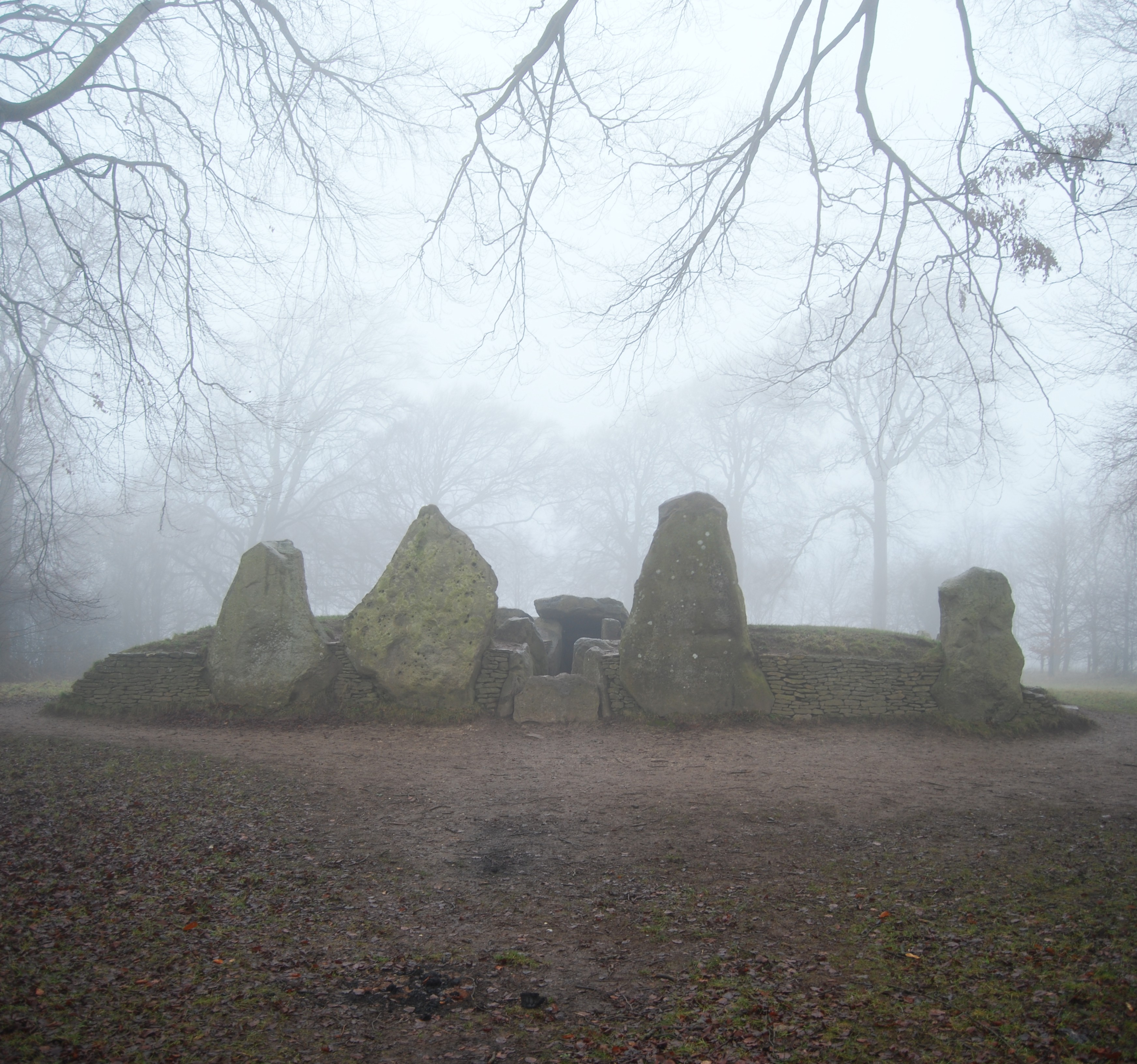
The prehistoric site of Wayland's Smithy was erroneously regarded as Bagsecg's memorial as early as the eighteenth- and nineteenth centuries.

As a result of Bagsecg's demise, it would appear that Healfdene temporarily reigned as the sole king of the Great Army. (Note: Coins bearing Healfdene's name, minted in London at about the time of the Great Army's removal from Wessex, reveal that he was the most prominent leader of the Vikings in London.) The evidence of the Vikings' constant campaigning against the West Saxons, combined with the fact that a considerable number of men must have been left behind in East Anglia, suggests that the Great Army was considerably weaker in the Spring of 871 than it had been before then. Nevertheless, news of their success in Wessex appears to have enticed the arrival of another Viking army at Reading. This overseas force, variously called micel sumorlida by the Anglo-Saxon Chronicle, thereupon united with Healfdene's men. (Note: The Old English micel sumorlida, micel sumer lida, and mycel sumorlida, can translate as "big summer-army", "great summer army", "great summer-army", "great summer-fleet", "great summer fleet", "great summer-force", "great summer hosting", "great summer-lead", "large Danish summer-fleet", and "large summer force".) The commanders of this arriving army could well be identical to Guthrum, Oscytel, and Anwend, three Viking kings noted by the Anglo-Saxon Chronicle in 875. One or more of these men may have been elevated to the status of king because of Bagsecg's death in 871.

As early as the eighteenth- and nineteenth centuries, Bagsecg has been associated with Wayland's Smithy, a Neolithic long barrow, erroneously assumed to have been erected as a memorial to him. (Note: The barrow has also been associated with the Germanic mythological figure Wayland the Smith. An Anglo-Saxon charter appears to reveal that the site was associated with Wayland as early as the ninth century. The site was certainly connected with the legend of a supernatural smith by the eighteenth- and nineteenth centuries. In fact, Alfred himself refers to Wayland in his Old English translation of the sixth-century De consolatione philosophiae. One possibility is that, if the barrow was located near where the Battle of Ashdown was fought, Alfred was aware of the site and knew of its association with the legend of Wayland. In the nineteenth-century, it was conjectured that a particular tree in Harwell—called "Bag's Tree"—marked the spot of Bagsecg's demise.) Other prehistoric sites, specifically the Seven Barrows in the region of Lambourn, have been mistakenly interpreted as memorials to the earls slain at the Battle of Ashdown. As early as the eighteenth- and nineteenth centuries, the Uffington White Horse, dating to the Late Bronze Age, has been incorrectly considered as an Anglo-Saxon memorial to Alfred and the victory at the Battle of Ashdown.
