= Battle of Ashdown =

Battle between West Saxon and Danish Vikings in 871

Coordinates: 51°31′44.07″N 1°12′59″W

- Part of the Viking invasions of England
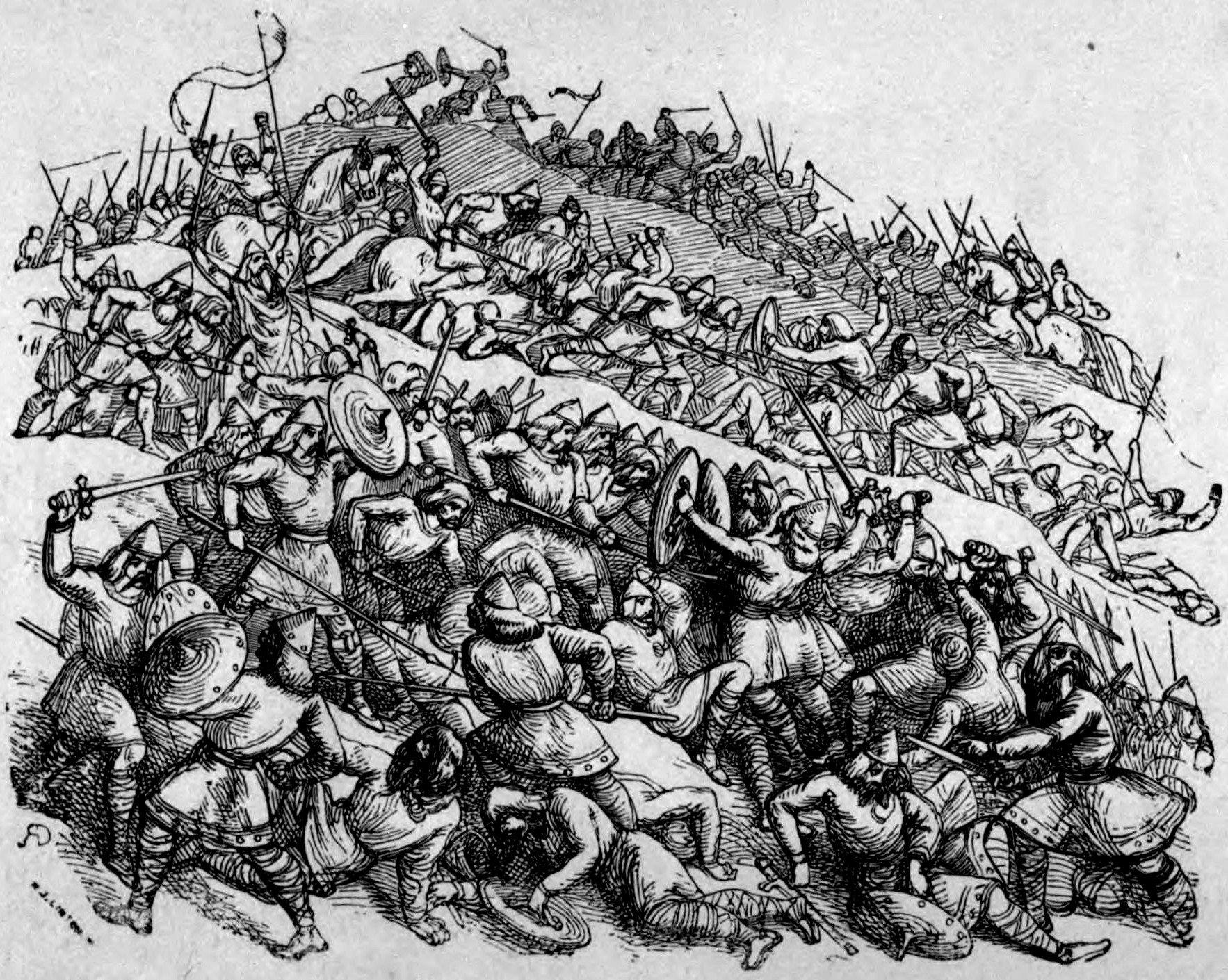
- A nineteenth-century depiction of the Battle of Ashdown.
Date	c. 8 January 871
Location	Berkshire
Result	West Saxon Victory • Multiple Norse earls slain

Belligerents
West Saxons	Vikings

Commanders and leaders
Æthelred; Alfred	Bagsecg †; Halfdan; Sidroc the Old †; Sidroc the Younger †; Osbern †; Fræna †; Harold †

The Battle of Ashdown was a West Saxon victory over a Danish Viking army on about 8 January 871. The location of Ashdown is not known, but may be Kingstanding Hill (Note: John Peddie argues the case for locating the Battle of Ashdown at Kingstanding Hill in Moulsford.) in Berkshire. Other writers place the battle near Starveall, a short distance north of the village of Aldworth and south east of Lowbury Hill.

The West Saxons were led by King Æthelred and his younger brother, the future King Alfred the Great, while the Viking commanders were Bagsecg and Halfdan. The battle is described in the Anglo-Saxon Chronicle and Asser's Life of King Alfred.

== Prelude ==
By 870, the Vikings had conquered two of the four Anglo-Saxon kingdoms, Northumbria and East Anglia. At the end of 870 they launched an attempt to conquer Wessex and marched from East Anglia to Reading, arriving on about 28 December. Three days after their arrival they sent out a large foraging party, which was defeated by an army of local levies under the command of Æthelwulf, Ealdorman of Berkshire, at the Battle of Englefield, but only four days later the main West Saxon army under Æthelred and Alfred was defeated at the Battle of Reading.

== Battle ==
Four days later, on about 8 January, the armies fought again at Ashdown. The Vikings arrived first at the battle ground and deployed along the top of the ridge, giving them the advantage. They divided their forces into two contingents, one under their kings, Bagsecg and Halfdan, the other under their earls. When the West Saxons heard this from their scouts, they decided to copy the formation, with Æthelred facing the kings and Alfred the earls. The king then retired to his tent to hear Mass, while Alfred led his forces to the battlefield. Both sides formed their forces into shield walls. Æthelred would not cut short his devotions and Alfred risked being outflanked and overwhelmed by the whole Danish army. He decided to attack and led his men in an uphill charge. Battle then raged around a small thorn tree and finally the West Saxons were victorious. Although both the Anglo-Saxon Chronicle and Asser emphasise Alfred's role in the victory, in the view of Richard Abels it was the attack by Æthelred when he joined the battle which was decisive and he might have intended all along to take the Vikings unaware. They suffered heavy losses, including King Bagsecg and five earls, Sidroc the Old, Sidroc the Younger, Osbern, Fræna, and Harold. The West Saxons pursued the fleeing Vikings until nightfall, cutting them down. However, victory proved short-lived, as it was followed by two defeats, at Basing and Meretun. Soon after Easter, which fell on 15 April in that year, Æthelred died and was succeeded by Alfred.

The Battle of Ashdown can be dated because Bishop Heahmund of Sherborne died in the Battle of Meretun, and it is known that he died on 22 March 871. The Anglo-Saxon Chronicle records that the Battle of Basing was two months earlier, dating it to 22 January, Ashdown fourteen days before that on 8 January, Reading four days earlier on 4 January, Englefield another four days earlier on 31 December 870 and the arrival of the Vikings in Reading three days earlier on 28 December. However, as the two month interval between Meretun and Basing is probably not exact, the earlier dates are approximate.
