= Battle of Reading (871) =

Part of the Viking invasions of England

Coordinates: 51.46°N 0.96°W

- Part of the Viking invasions of England
Date	c. 4 January 871
Location	Reading, Berkshire
Result	Viking victory

Belligerents
West Saxons	Danish Vikings

Commanders and leaders
Æthelred; Alfred	Bagsecg; Halfdan Ragnarsson

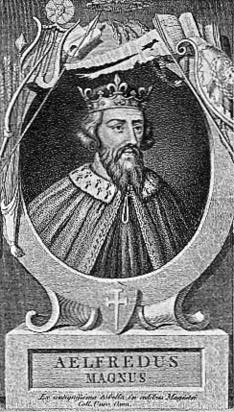
A depiction of Alfred the Great

The Battle of Reading was a victory for a Danish Viking army over a West Saxon force on or about 4 January 871 at Reading in Berkshire. The Vikings were led by Bagsecg and Halfdan Ragnarsson and the West Saxons by King Æthelred and his brother, the future King Alfred the Great. It was the second of a series of battles that took place following an invasion of Wessex by the Danish army in December 870.

== Prelude ==
By 870, the Vikings had conquered two of the four Anglo-Saxon kingdoms, Northumbria and East Anglia. At the end of 870 they launched an attempt to conquer Wessex and marched from East Anglia to Reading, arriving on about 28 December. The town was between the Thames and Kennet rivers and they set about building a ditch and rampart on the southern side between the two rivers. Three days after their arrival they sent out a large foraging party, which was defeated by an army of local levies under the command of Æthelwulf, Ealdorman of Berkshire, at the Battle of Englefield.

== Battle ==
After another four days, on about 4 January 871, Æthelred and Alfred brought up the main West Saxon army and joined Æthelwulf's forces for an attack on the Danes. The West Saxons fought their way to the town, slaughtering all the Danes they found outside, but when they reached the town gate the Vikings burst out and defeated the West Saxons with a successful counterattack. Among the dead was Æthelwulf, whose body was secretly carried off to be buried in his native Derby. According to a late source, Æthelred and Alfred only escaped due their better knowledge of the local terrain, which allowed them to lose their pursuers by fording the River Loddon.

== Aftermath ==
Their surviving forces regrouped at Windsor and four days later Æthelred and Alfred were victorious at the Battle of Ashdown, but they were then defeated again at the battles of Basing and Meretun. Soon after Easter, which fell on 15 April in that year, Æthelred died and was succeeded by Alfred.

The Battle of Reading can be dated because Bishop Heahmund of Sherborne died in the Battle of Meretun, and it is known that he died on 22 March 871. The Anglo-Saxon Chronicle records that the Battle of Basing was two months earlier, dating it to 22 January, Ashdown fourteen days before that on 8 January, Reading four days earlier on 4 January, Englefield another four days earlier on 31 December 870 and the arrival of the Vikings in Reading three days earlier on 28 December. However, as the two-month interval between Meretun and Basing is probably not exact, the earlier dates are approximate.
