= Battle of Englefield =

Part of the Viking invasions of England (870)

Coordinates: 51.444°N 1.100°W

- Part of the Viking invasions of England
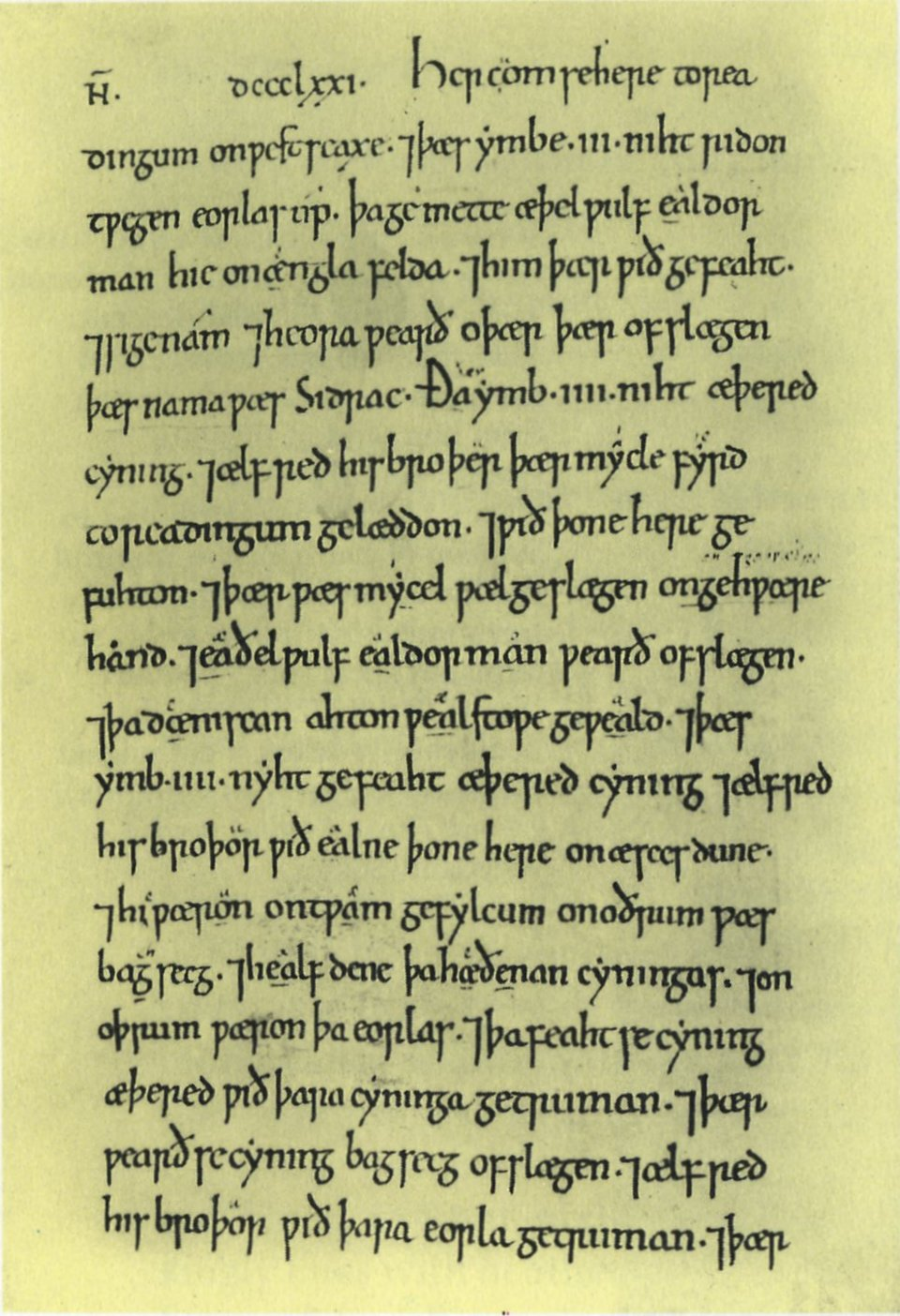
- A page in the Anglo-Saxon Chronicle describing the Battle of Englefield
Date	About 31 December 870
Location	Englefield, Berkshire
Result	Saxon Victory

Belligerents
Wessex	Denmark

Commanders and leaders
Æthelwulf of Berkshire	Two Earls

The Battle of Englefield was a West Saxon victory against a Danish Viking army on about 31 December 870 at Englefield, near Reading in Berkshire. It was the first of a series of battles that took place following an invasion of Wessex by the Danish army in December 870.

By 870, the Vikings had conquered two of the four Anglo-Saxon kingdoms, Northumbria and East Anglia. At the end of 870 they launched an attempt to conquer Wessex and marched from East Anglia to Reading, arriving on about 28 December. Three days later they sent out a large party under two earls to forage and reconnoitre, and it was met at Englefield by an army of local levies under the command of Æthelwulf, Ealdorman of Berkshire. After one of the earls was killed and a large part of the Danish army was overthrown, the Viking force broke and ran.

The victory was short-lived. Four days later, the main West Saxon army, led by King Ethelred and his brother, the future King Alfred the Great, attacked the main Danish encampment at Reading and were bloodily repulsed in the Battle of Reading. Among the many dead of both sides was Æthelwulf. Further battles followed, including the Battle of Ashdown, a West Saxon victory, and the Battle of Meretun, when the Danes prevailed. Soon after Easter, which fell on 15 April in that year, Æthelred died and was succeeded by Alfred.

The Battle of Englefield can be dated because Bishop Heahmund of Sherborne died in the Battle of Meretun, and it is known that he died on 22 March 871. The Anglo-Saxon Chronicle records that the Battle of Basing was two months earlier, dating it to 22 January, Ashdown fourteen days before that on 8 January, Reading four days earlier on 4 January, Englefield another four days earlier on 31 December 870, and the arrival of the Vikings in Reading three days earlier on 28 December. However, as the two month interval between Meretun and Basing is probably not exact, the earlier dates are approximate.
