= Wulfhere, Ealdorman of Wiltshire =

Wulfhere
- Ealdorman of Wiltshire
- Anglo-Saxon England
- Ealdorman: 855-?877
- Successor: Æthelholm

Wulfhere (fl. AD 855-?877) was Ealdorman for Wiltshire, (Note: Sometimes recorded as Wulfhere, Ealdorman of Hampshire.) when the Anglo-Saxon kingdoms, of England, were experiencing turbulent times. An invading Danish army had landed in East Anglia, in 865 and had conquered all of the English kingdoms apart from Wessex. The Danish king Guthrum was overrunning the kingdom of Wessex, with Alfred, king of Wessex in retreat. The county of Wiltshire was part of Wessex and on its northern border was Danish held Mercia. Evidence from the charters of the time suggests that Wulfhere came to an arrangement with the Viking Guthrum rather than remain loyal to Alfred. When Alfred was able to regain control of his kingdom, Wulfhere was held to account.

== Background ==
In 865 the Great Danish Army landed in East Anglia with the intention of conquering all the English kingdoms. During their campaign, the Viking army conquered the kingdoms of East Anglia, Mercia, and Northumbria and they overran the kingdom of Wessex.

Ealdormen were responsible for ruling the shires on behalf of the king (Alfred the Great). Wulfhere was the Anglo Saxon ealdormen for Wiltshire.

Guthrum, the leader of the Danish army, from his base in Gloucester (Mercia) had been tracking the whereabouts of Alfred and his army. He discovered where Alfred was spending Christmas of 878. Then shortly after Christmas, Guthrum carried out a surprise attack on Alfred's royal vill, at Chippenham, Wiltshire. Alfred managed to escape into the marshes around Athelney. As Ealdorman for Wiltshire, Wulfhere was responsible for the kings security, he had obviously failed in his duty, but why?

== Treason and confiscation of lands ==
A charter (Note: Charter S.362)from Alfred's successors reign, his son, Edward the Elder may give the answer. It says that

"an estate by the River Wylye, (Note: Later called the manor of Stockton.) granted to Æthelwulf, was land that had been confiscated from Wulfhere and his wife, for deserting both Alfred and his country in spite of the oath which he had sworn to the king and all his leading men. This confiscation was done with the agreement of all the wisemen of the Gewisse and the Mercians."

— PASE 2010 S.362.

The fact that the two witans sat in judgement indicates the importance of the Wulfhere family. The charter from Edward's reign is dated 901. The dates when Wulfhere had his land confiscated and was replaced, as Eolderman by Æthelholm, is not known, due to the absence of datable charters from the time.

== Possible deal with Guthrum ==
Wulfhere is the only one of Alfred's Ealdormen to be named for desertion. However the Anglo-Saxon Chronicle for 878 says:

"This year, during midwinter, after twelfth night, the [Danish] army stole away to Chippenham, and overran the land of the West-Saxons, and sat down there; and many of the people they drove beyond sea, and of the remainder the greater part they subdued and forced to obey them."

— Giles 1914, ASC 878

Alfred was retreating and Guthrum had overrun a large part of Wessex, and the Chronicle says that the greater part of the population had to submit to him. The historian Barbara Yorke suggests that Wulfhere may have been the brother of Queen Wulfthryth, the wife of Alfred's elder brother, King Æthelred, King of Wessex and uncle of Wulfthryth's sons, Æthelhelm and Æthelwold; Alfred became king when Æthelred died in 871 because Æthelred's sons were young children, and Wulfhere may have negotiated with Guthrum in 878 with the aim of making one of his nephews a client king of Wessex. However, when Alfred reestablished control after his victory at the Battle of Edington, Wulfhere's negotiations with Guthrum would have been construed as treason.

A reflection of how important Wulhere and his family were, can be inferred by the fact that not all his lands were confiscated. Two pieces of land granted to Wulfhere, by Æthelred in 863, (Note: Charter S.336) were still in the family during the time of Wulfhere's grandson Wulfgar. (Note: Charter S.1533)
