= Wulfthryth =

Wulfthryth may refer to

- Wulfthryth of Wessex (fl. 868), queen consort of Wessex
- Wulfthryth of Wilton (10th century), mother of Saint Edith
