= Æthelred I of Wessex =

King of Wessex from 865 to 871

Æthelred I
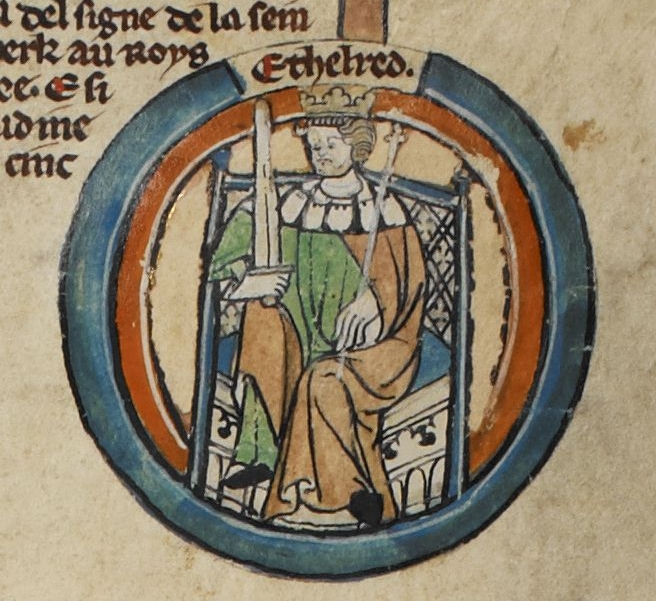
- Æthelred as depicted in the early fourteenth-century Genealogical Roll of the Kings of England

King of Wessex
- Reign: 865 – Late April 871
- Predecessor: Æthelberht
- Successor: Alfred
- Born: 845/848; Wessex, England
- Died: Late April 871 (aged 23–26)
- Burial: Wimborne Minster, Dorset
- Spouse: Wulfthryth
- Issue: Æthelhelm; Æthelwold
- House: Wessex
- Father: Æthelwulf
- Mother: Osburh

Æthelred I (alt. Aethelred, Ethelred; Old English: Æthel-ræd, lit. 'noble counsel'; 845/848 – Late April 871) was King of Wessex from 865 until his death in 871. He was the fourth of five sons of King Æthelwulf of Wessex, four of whom in turn became king. Æthelred succeeded his elder brother Æthelberht and was followed by his youngest brother, Alfred the Great. Æthelred had two sons, Æthelhelm and Æthelwold, who were passed over for the kingship on their father's death because they were still infants. Æthelwold later unsuccessfully disputed the throne with Alfred's son and successor, Edward the Elder.

Æthelred's accession coincided with the arrival of the Viking Great Heathen Army in England. Over the next five years the Vikings conquered Northumbria and East Anglia, and at the end of 870 they launched a full-scale attack on Wessex. In early January 871, Æthelred was defeated at the Battle of Reading. Four days later, he scored a victory in the Battle of Ashdown, but this was followed by two defeats at Basing and Meretun. He died shortly after Easter. Alfred was forced to pay off the Vikings, but he scored a decisive victory over them seven years later at the Battle of Edington.

Æthelred's reign was important in the history of Anglo-Saxon coinage. Wessex and Mercia were close allies when he became king, and he carried the alliance further by adopting the Mercian Lunettes design, thus creating a unified coinage design for southern England for the first time. The common design foreshadowed the unification of England over the next sixty years and the reform coinage (Note: Edgar's radical coinage reform of the 970s heralded a monetary system which was the most sophisticated in Europe. It lasted 150 years.) of King Edgar a century later.

== Background ==
Æthelred's grandfather, Ecgberht, became king of Wessex in 802, and in the view of the historian Richard Abels, it must have seemed very unlikely to contemporaries that he would establish a lasting dynasty. For two hundred years, three families had fought for the West Saxon throne, and no son had followed his father as king. No ancestor of Ecgberht had been a king of Wessex since Ceawlin in the late sixth century, but he was believed to be a paternal descendant of Cerdic, the founder of the West Saxon dynasty. (Note: Historians have expressed doubt both whether the genealogy for Ecgberht going back to Cerdic was fabricated to legitimise his seizure of the West Saxon throne, and broadly whether Cerdic was a real person or if the story of Cerdic is a "foundation myth".) This made Ecgberht an ætheling – a prince eligible for the throne. But after Ecgberht's reign, descent from Cerdic was no longer sufficient to make a man an ætheling. When Ecgberht died in 839 he was succeeded by his son Æthelwulf; all subsequent West Saxon kings were Ecgberht's descendants and were also sons of kings.

Southern Britain in the ninth century

At the beginning of the ninth century, England was almost wholly under the control of the Anglo-Saxons. The Midland kingdom of Mercia dominated southern England, but its supremacy came to an end in 825 when it was decisively defeated by Ecgberht at the Battle of Ellendun. The two kingdoms became allies, which was important in the resistance to Viking attacks. In 853, King Burgred of Mercia requested West Saxon help to suppress a Welsh rebellion, and Æthelwulf led a West Saxon contingent in a successful joint campaign. In the same year Burgred married Æthelwulf's daughter, Æthelswith.

In 825, Ecgberht sent Æthelwulf to invade the Mercian sub-kingdom of Kent, and its underking, Baldred, was driven out shortly afterwards. By 830, Essex, Surrey and Sussex had also submitted to Ecgberht, and he had appointed Æthelwulf to rule the south-eastern territories as King of Kent. The Vikings ravaged the Isle of Sheppey in 835, and the following year they defeated Ecgberht at Carhampton in Somerset, but in 838 he was victorious over an alliance of Cornishmen and Vikings at the Battle of Hingston Down, reducing Cornwall to the status of a client kingdom. When Æthelwulf succeeded, he appointed his eldest son Æthelstan (who died in the early 850s) as sub-king of Kent. Ecgberht and Æthelwulf might not have intended a permanent union between Wessex and Kent as they both appointed sons as underkings and charters in Wessex were attested (witnessed) by West Saxon magnates, while Kentish charters were witnessed by the Kentish elite; both kings kept overall control and the underkings were not allowed to issue their own coinage.

Viking raids increased in the early 840s on both sides of the English Channel, and in 843 Æthelwulf was defeated at Carhampton. In 850, Æthelstan defeated a Danish fleet off Sandwich in the first recorded naval battle in English history. In 851 Æthelwulf and his second son Æthelbald defeated the Vikings at the Battle of Aclea and, according to the Anglo-Saxon Chronicle, "there made the greatest slaughter of a heathen raiding-army that we have heard tell of up to this present day, and there took the victory". Æthelwulf died in 858 and was succeeded by his oldest surviving son, Æthelbald, as king of Wessex and by his next oldest son, Æthelberht, as king of Kent. Æthelbald only survived his father by two years and Æthelberht then for the first time united Wessex and Kent into a single kingdom.

== Early life ==
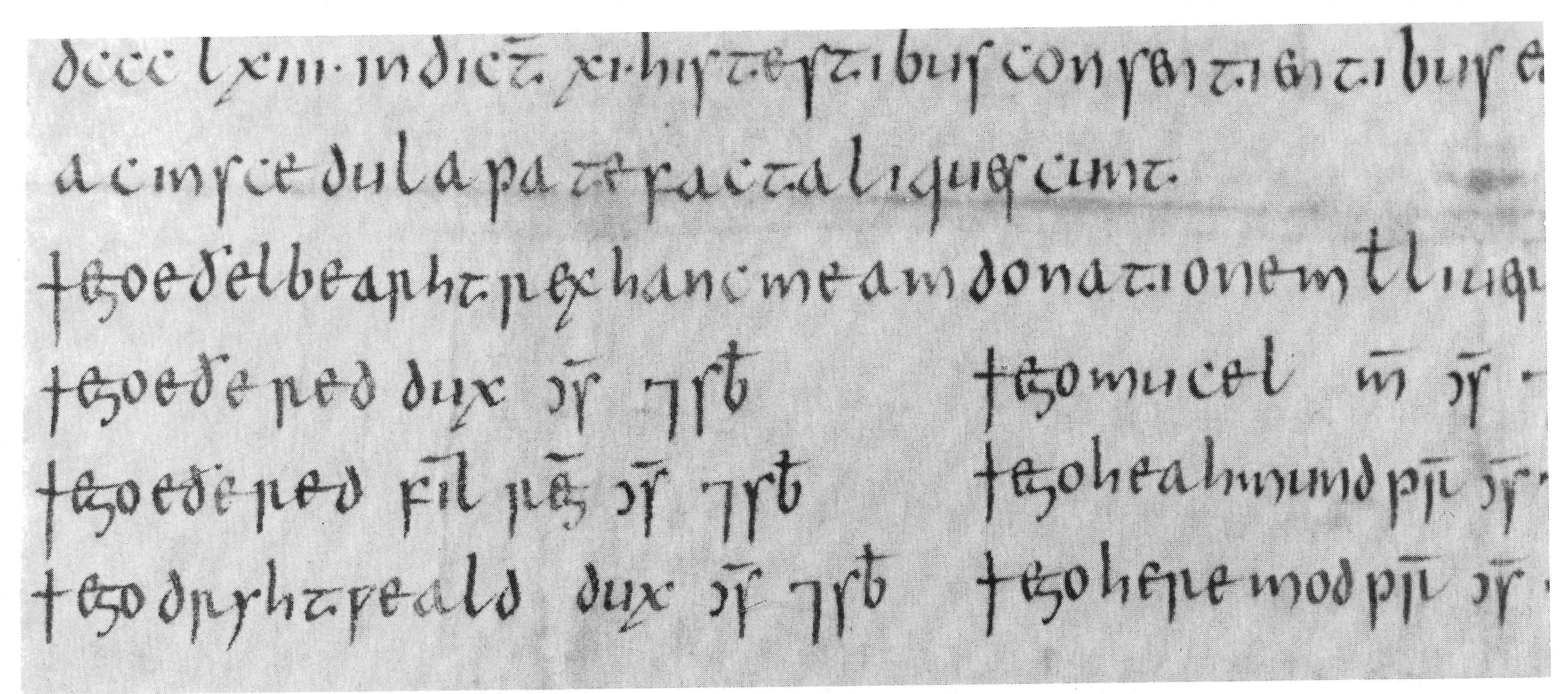
Charter S 332 dated 863 of King Æthelberht. Æthelred attests second from bottom on the left as "Æthelred fil[ius] reg[is]".

Æthelred was the fourth of five sons of King Æthelwulf. His mother, Osburh, was of West Saxon royal descent. According to the historian Sean Miller, Æthelred was probably a year or so older than his younger brother, the future Alfred the Great, who was born 848–9, but Richard Abels says that Æthelred was around eight years old in 853, which would mean he was born about 845. Manuscript A of the Anglo-Saxon Chronicle, which was written in the 890s, states that in 853 Alfred was sent by his father to Rome and was consecrated by the Pope as king. Historians do not believe that he was consecrated king at this young age and the real nature of the ceremony is explained in an extract from a letter of Pope Leo IV to Æthelwulf, which records that he decorated Alfred "as a spiritual son, with the dignity of the belt and the vestments of the consulate, as is customary with Roman consuls". The contemporary Liber Vitae (confraternity book) of San Salvatore, Brescia, records the names of both Æthelred and Alfred, indicating that both brothers went to Rome. It is likely that Æthelred was also decorated by the pope, but the ceremony was later regarded as foreshadowing Alfred's greatness and neither the chronicler nor the eleventh-century extractor from the Pope's letters were interested in recording the presence of his lesser known elder brother.

Æthelred first witnessed his father's charters as filius regis (king's son) in 854, and he witnessed with this title until he succeeded to the throne in 865. He may have acted as an underking before his accession, as in 862 and 863 he issued his own charters as King of the West Saxons. This must have been as deputy or in the absence of his elder brother, King Æthelberht, as there is no record of conflict between them and he continued to witness his brother's charters as a king's son in 864. (Note: The first charter which Æthelred witnessed was S 308 in 854. He issued charters S 335 in 862 and S 336 in 863 as King of the West Saxons. He witnessed S 333, issued by King Æthelberht in 864, as filius regis (king's son). Simon Keynes defends the authenticity of S 335 and S 336. "S" means the number in the Sawyer catalogue of Anglo-Saxon charters.)

== Reign ==
=== Civilian rule ===
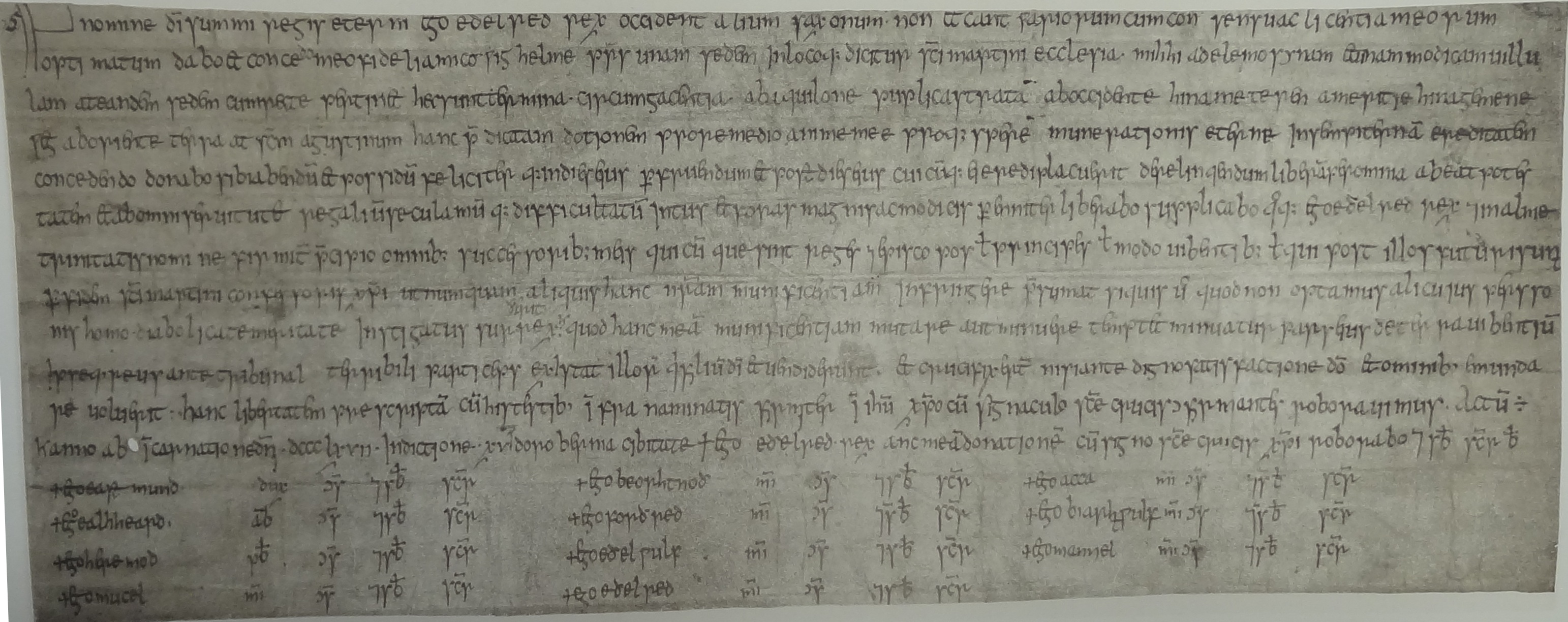
Charter S 338 dated 867. Æthelred, King of the West Saxons and the Men of Kent, grants Wighelm, priest, a seat in St Martin's Church, Canterbury, together with land. Most charters only survive as copies, and this is the only original of Æthelred to survive.

Æthelred succeeded to the throne on Æthelberht's death in 865, and he married Wulfthryth at an unknown date. West Saxon kings' wives had a low status in the ninth century and very little is known about them. They were not usually given the title of regina (queen), an omission which Alfred the Great justified on the ground of the misconduct of a queen at the beginning of the ninth century. The name of Æthelred's wife is only known because she was recorded as a witness to one charter, S 340 of 868, where she is shown as Wulfthryth regina, suggesting that she had a higher status than other kings' wives. The only other ninth century king's wife known to have been given the title was Æthelwulf's second wife, Judith of Flanders, a great-granddaughter of Charlemagne. Wulfthryth and Æthelred had two known sons, Æthelhelm and Æthelwold. (Note: Æthelred may have had a third son, Oswald or Osweald, who witnessed two charters in 868 as filius regis, and one more during Alfred's reign in 875 with the same title. David Dumville suggests that he may have been a son of Æthelred; however, this is dismissed by Janet Nelson on the ground that only Æthelhelm and Æthelwold are mentioned in the prologue to Alfred's will, where he describes disputes shortly after his succession in 871 over his treatment of Æthelred's sons.) She might have been Mercian or a daughter of Wulfhere, Ealdorman of Wiltshire, who forfeited his lands after being charged with deserting King Alfred for the Danes in about 878, perhaps because he attempted to secure Viking support for his elder grandson Æthelhelm's claim to the throne against Alfred.

Alfred records in the preamble to his will that Æthelwulf had left property jointly to three of his sons, Æthelbald, Æthelred and Alfred, with the proviso that the brother who lived longest would succeed to all of it. When Æthelbald died in 860, Æthelred and Alfred, who were still young, agreed to entrust their share to the new king, Æthelberht, on a promise that he would return it to them intact. When Æthelred succeeded to the throne, Alfred asked him at a meeting of the witan (assembly of leading men) to give him his share of the property. However, Æthelred said that he had attempted many times to divide it but had found it too difficult, and he would instead leave the whole to Alfred on his death. Some historians see the bequest as including the whole of Æthelwulf's bookland, his personal property which he could leave in his will (as opposed to the folkland which passed according to customary law and property earmarked for the support of the crown); it is further argued that it was considered desirable that the bookland would be kept by the king, so Æthelwulf's provision implies that the throne would pass to each brother in turn. However, other historians assert that the bequest had nothing to do with the kingship, and Alfred Smyth argues that the bequest was provision for Æthelwulf's young sons when they reached adulthood, with Æthelbald as trustee and residuary beneficiary if they died young. When Alfred succeeded, the supporters of Æthelred's infant sons complained that Alfred should have shared the property with them, and Alfred had his father's will read to a meeting of the witan to prove his right to keep the whole of the property. Alfred rarely witnessed Æthelred's charters, and this together with the argument over their father's will suggests that they were not on good terms. The historian Pauline Stafford suggests that Æthelred chose to highlight his wife's status as queen in a charter to assert his own sons' claims to the succession.

In 868, Æthelred issued a charter which was attested by a Mercian ætheling and himself attested a charter issued by his sister, Æthelswith, as queen of Mercia. Æthelred used several different titles in his charters. He is called by his father's usual title, Rex Occidentalium Saxonum (King of the West Saxons) in the charter of Ealhswith which he witnessed, and in five of his own. He is "King of the West Saxons and the Men of Kent" in two, and "King" and "King of the Saxons" in one each. (Note: Alfred Smyth translates Æthelred's titles as "King of Wessex" and "King of Wessex and Kent", but the translations here follow the usual (and literal) translations as "West Saxons" and "Men of Kent".) The West Saxon charters of Æthelred and his elder brothers followed a uniform style, suggesting that they were produced by a single agency which operated over a number of years. (Note: Simon Keynes analysed Æthelred's West Saxon charters (not his Kentish ones) in his "The West Saxon Charters of King Æthelwulf and his Sons".)

=== The Viking invasions ===
Routes taken by the Great Heathen Army from 865 to 878

The character of Viking attacks on England decisively changed in the year that Æthelred succeeded to the throne. Previously the country had suffered from sporadic raids, but now it faced an invasion aiming at conquest and settlement. A large force of Vikings, called by contemporaries the Great Heathen Army, arrived in East Anglia. King Edmund purchased peace by paying tribute and the Vikings stayed a year building up their strength. They then marched on York and conquered Northumbria, installing a puppet king. In late 867, they took Nottingham in Mercia and spent the winter there. Æthelred's brother-in-law, King Burgred, appealed to him for help. Æthelred and Alfred led a large West Saxon army to Nottingham and besieged the Vikings, but they refused to leave the safety of the town's defences. The combined Mercian and West Saxon armies were unable to breach the earth ramparts and ditch, and eventually Burgred bought them off. The Vikings then went back to York. (Note: In 874, the Vikings took control of Mercia and drove Burgred and Æthelswith into exile.)

In 869, the Vikings returned to East Anglia and conquered the kingdom, killing King Edmund. In December 870, they launched an attempt to conquer Wessex led by Kings Bagsecg and Halfdan. They occupied Reading on around 28 December. The town is between the Thames and Kennet rivers, and they set about building a ditch and rampart on the southern side between the two rivers. Three days after their arrival they sent out a large foraging party, which was defeated by an army of local levies under the command of Æthelwulf, Ealdorman of Berkshire, at the Battle of Englefield. After another four days, on about 4 January 871, Æthelred and Alfred brought up the main West Saxon army and joined Æthelwulf's forces for an attack on the Danes in the Battle of Reading. The West Saxons fought their way to the town, slaughtering all the Danes they found outside, but when they reached the town gate the Vikings burst out and defeated the West Saxons with a successful counter-attack. Among the dead was Æthelwulf, whose body was secretly carried off to be buried in his native Derby. According to the twelfth-century chronicler Gaimar, Æthelred and Alfred only escaped due to their better knowledge of the local terrain, which allowed them to lose their pursuers by fording the River Loddon at Twyford and going on to Whistley Green, which is around 6 miles (9.7 kilometres) east of Reading.

Four days later, on about 8 January, the armies met again in the Battle of Ashdown. The location of the battle is unknown, but may be Kingstanding Hill, 13 miles (21 kilometres) north-west of Reading. According to Asser's account, the Vikings arrived first at the battle ground and deployed along the top of the ridge, giving them the advantage. They divided their forces into two contingents, one under their two kings and the other under their earls. When the West Saxons saw this, they decided to copy the formation, with Æthelred facing the kings and Alfred the earls. The king then retired to his tent to hear Mass, while Alfred led his forces to the battlefield. Both sides formed their forces into shield walls. Æthelred would not cut short his devotions (Note: According to Asser: "Alfred and his men reached the battlefield sooner and in better order: for his brother, King Æthelred, was still at his tent in prayer, hearing Mass and declaring firmly that he would not leave that place alive before the priest had finished Mass, and that he would not forsake divine service for that of men; and he did what he said. The faith of the Christian king counted for much with the Lord, as shall be shown more clearly in what follows.) and Alfred risked being outflanked and overwhelmed by the whole Danish army. He decided to attack and led his men in a charge. Battle then raged around a small thorn tree and finally the West Saxons were victorious. Although Asser emphasises Alfred's role in the victory and implies that Æthelred was dilatory, in the view of the military historian John Peddie, Æthelred was militarily correct to delay joining the battle until the situation was in his favour. The Vikings suffered heavy losses, including King Bagsecg and five earls, Sidroc the Old, Sidroc the Younger, Osbern, Fræna and Harold. The West Saxons followed the Viking flight until nightfall, cutting them down. The historian Barbara Yorke, who sees Asser's biography as intended to portray Alfred as an ideal king, comments that "Asser is particularly careful to give much credit to Alfred".

However, the victory was short-lived. Two weeks later, Æthelred and Alfred were defeated at the royal estate of Basing in the Battle of Basing. There was then a lull of two months until the West Saxons and the Vikings met at an unknown location called Meretun. In the battle on 22 March the Vikings again divided into two divisions and the West Saxons had the advantage for much of the day, putting both divisions to flight, but the Vikings regrouped and finally held control of the battlefield. The West Saxons lost many important men, including Heahmund, the Bishop of Sherborne. (Note: The death of Bishop Heahmund in the battle dates the sequence of events, as it is known that he died on 22 March 871. The Anglo-Saxon Chronicle records that the Battle of Basing was two months before Meretun, dating it to 22 January, Ashdown fourteen days before that on 8 January, Reading four days earlier on 4 January, Englefield another four days earlier on 31 December 870 and the arrival of the Vikings in Reading three days earlier on 28 December. However, as the two month interval between Marton and Basing is probably not exact, the earlier dates are approximate.)

=== Coinage ===
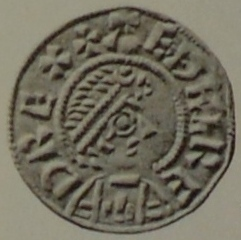
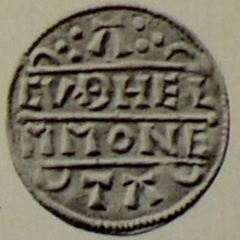
Obverse and reverse of early Four Line silver penny of Æthelred

In the late eighth and ninth centuries, the only denomination of coin produced in southern England was the silver penny. As of 2007, 152 coins of Æthelred struck by 32 different moneyers have been recorded. (Note: There are also ten coins of Ceolnoth, who was Archbishop of Canterbury until his death in 870.) His reign is described by the numismatists Adrian Lyons and William Mackay as "a critical point in the development of the English coinage". His first Four Line issue was stylistically similar to the Floriate Cross penny of his predecessor, Æthelberht, but he soon abandoned this and adopted the design of his Mercian brother-in-law, Burgred, resulting in a common coinage design across southern England for the first time. The historian and numismatist Rory Naismith comments that Æthelred:

took the important step of adopting a new coin-type based not on local tradition, but on the Lunettes-type current in contemporary Mercia. The year 865 thus saw not only the arrival of the Viking great army that would dismantle most of the Anglo-Saxon kingdoms, but also the beginning of the end for separate coinages in separate kingdoms.

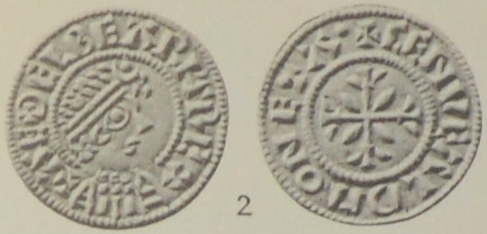
Silver penny of King Æthelberht of Wessex (Æthelred's predecessor)

Lyons and Mackay see the change as even more crucial:

The developments of the late 860s can thus be viewed as an essential precursor that eventually led to the unified reform coinage of Edgar. This convergence of the coinage is also tangible evidence for a growing collaboration between Mercia and Wessex which foreshadowed the eventual creation of a unified England.

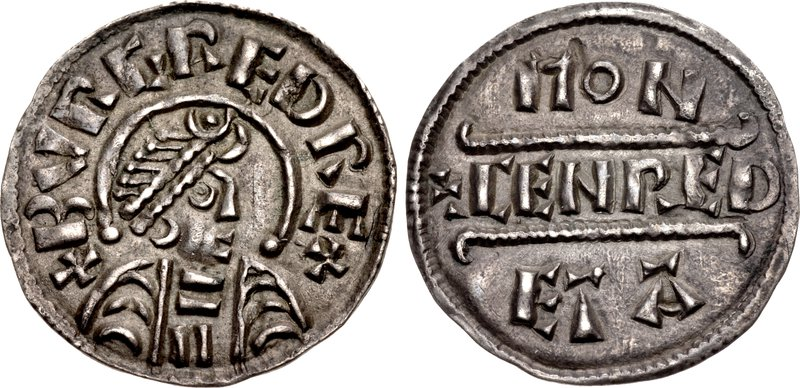
Silver penny of King Burgred of Mercia (Æthelred's brother-in-law), struck 866–870

The single coinage design created a form of monetary union in southern England, reinforcing the mingling of economic interests between the two kingdoms and the military alliance against the Vikings. Coin hoards in Wessex dating to the earlier period of separate coinage designs have few non-Wessex coins, but after the adoption of the common Lunettes design, coins of Wessex and Mercia were used in both kingdoms, and even in Wessex hoards coins of Æthelred I form a minor proportion of the total. Between one and one and a half million Æthelred I Regular Lunette coins were produced, but this seems to have been significantly less than in Mercia. It is not known why the Mercian design was adopted, but it probably reflects the fact that the Lunette type had already been used for more than twelve years, the simplicity of the design, which could easily be copied, and the greater strength of the Mercian economy. The bulk of surviving Æthelred I coins are of the Regular Lunettes design, with 118 coins struck by 21 moneyers, six of whom are known to have also worked for Burgred; the coins are notable for consistency in design and good quality of execution, and they were mainly produced by Canterbury moneyers, with a few in the Mercian town of London. Only one coin is known which was produced in Wessex itself. There were also Irregular Lunettes issues, one of which was a degraded and crude variant, perhaps a result of a breakdown in controls at the end of Æthelred's reign, when Wessex was under the pressure of Viking attacks. Alfred kept the Lunettes design for a short period following his accession in 871, but the design disappears from hoards deposited after around 875.

== Death and aftermath ==
Shortly after Easter 871, which fell on 15 April in that year, Æthelred died. According to Asser, he "went the way of all flesh, having vigorously and honourably ruled the kingdom in good repute, amid many difficulties, for five years". He was buried at the royal minster at Wimborne in Dorset, which had been founded by Saint Cuthburh, a sister of his ancestor, Ingild. While Alfred was attending his funeral, the West Saxons suffered another defeat at Reading, and Alfred himself was then defeated at Wilton. He was forced to buy off the Vikings, who then withdrew to London. In 876, the Vikings returned, and Alfred fought a guerrilla war until he won a decisive victory at the Battle of Edington in 878.

Æthelred had two sons, and if he had lived until they were adults it is unlikely that Alfred would ever have become king, but as they were still young children, Alfred succeeded. Æthelhelm died before Alfred, and Æthelwold unsuccessfully disputed the throne with Edward the Elder after Alfred's death in 899. One of the two places where Æthelwold launched his rebellion was Wimborne, which was symbolically important as his father's burial place. Æthelred's descendants played an important role in governing the country in the late tenth and early eleventh centuries. They include Ealdorman Æthelweard, who recorded in his Latin version of the Anglo-Saxon Chronicle that he was Æthelred's great-great-grandson. King Eadwig was forced to accept annulment of his marriage to Ælfgifu due to consanguinity; she may have been Æthelweard's sister, which would make her Eadwig's third cousin once removed due to her descent from Æthelred, and thus within the forbidden degrees of relationship according to the church. Æthelweard and his son Æthelmær were leading magnates who governed west Wessex as ealdormen of the western provinces. The family lost their positions and property after Cnut conquered England in 1016, and one of Æthelmær's sons was executed by Cnut in 1017, while a son-in-law was banished in 1020. Another son, Æthelnoth, was Archbishop of Canterbury, and he lived until 1038.

== Bibliography ==
- Abels, Richard (1998). Alfred the Great: War, Kingship and Culture in Anglo-Saxon England. Harlow, UK: Longman. ISBN 0-582-04047-7.
- Abels, Richard (2002). "Royal Succession and the Growth of Political Stability in Ninth-Century Wessex". The Haskins Society Journal: Studies in Medieval History. 12: 83–97. ISBN 978-1-84383-008-5.
- Beaven, Murray (July 1918). "The Beginning of the Year in the Alfredian Chronicle (866–87)". English Historical Review. 33 (131): 328–42. doi:10.1093/ehr/XXXIII.CXXXI.328.
- Blackburn, M. A. S. (2014). "Coinage". In Lapidge, Michael; Blair, John; Keynes, Simon; Scragg, Donald (eds.). The Wiley Blackwell Encyclopedia of Anglo-Saxon England (Second ed.). Chichester, UK: Blackwell Publishing. pp. 115–16. ISBN 978-0-470-65632-7.
- Bouchard, Constance (1981). "Consanguinity and Noble Marriages in the Tenth and Eleventh Centuries". Speculum. 56 (2): 268–87. doi:10.2307/2846935. ISSN 0038-7134. JSTOR 2846935. PMID 11610836. S2CID 38717048.
- Brooks, N. P.; Kelly, S. E., eds. (2013). Charters of Christ Church Canterbury Part 2. Oxford, UK: Oxford University Press for the British Academy. ISBN 978-0-19-726536-9.
- Charles-Edwards, T. M. (2013). Wales and the Britons 350–1064. Oxford, UK: Oxford University Press. ISBN 978-0-19-821731-2.
- Dumville, David (1979). "The ætheling: a study in Anglo-Saxon constitutional history". Anglo-Saxon England. 8: 1–33. doi:10.1017/s026367510000301x. S2CID 159954001.
- Edwards, Heather (2004). "Ecgberht [Egbert] (d. 839)". Oxford Dictionary of National Biography. Oxford University Press. doi:10.1093/ref:odnb/8581. ISBN 978-0-19-861412-8. (subscription, Wikipedia Library access or UK public library membership required)
- Hollis, Stephanie (1992). Anglo-Saxon Women and the Church. Woodbridge, UK: Boydell. ISBN 978-0-85115-317-9.
- Kelly, Susan (2004). "Burgred [Burhred] (d. 874?)". Oxford Dictionary of National Biography. Oxford University Press. doi:10.1093/ref:odnb/4018. (subscription, Wikipedia Library access or UK public library membership required)
- Keynes, Simon; Lapidge, Michael, eds. (1983). Alfred the Great: Asser's Life of King Alfred & Other Contemporary Sources. London: Penguin Classics. ISBN 978-0-14-044409-4.
- Keynes, Simon (1993). "The Control of Kent in the Ninth Century". Early Medieval Europe. 2 (2): 111–31. doi:10.1111/j.1468-0254.1993.tb00013.x. ISSN 1468-0254.
- Keynes, Simon (November 1994). "The West Saxon Charters of King Æthelwulf and his sons". English Historical Review. 109: 1009–49. ISSN 0013-8266.
- Keynes, Simon (1995). "England, 700–900". In McKitterick, Rosamond (ed.). The New Cambridge Medieval History. Vol. II. Cambridge, UK: Cambridge University Press. pp. 18–42. ISBN 978-0-521-36292-4.
- Keynes, Simon (2004). "Æthelred II [Ethelred; known as Ethelred the Unready] (c. 966x8–1016)". Oxford Dictionary of National Biography. Oxford University Press. doi:10.1093/ref:odnb/8915. ISBN 978-0-19-861412-8. (subscription, Wikipedia Library access or UK public library membership required)
- Kirby, D. H. (2000). The Earliest English Kings (Revised ed.). London: Routledge. ISBN 978-0-415-24211-0.
- Lavelle, Ryan (2009). "The Politics of Rebellion: The Aetheling Aethelwold and West Saxon Royal Succession, 899–902". In Skinner, Patricia (ed.). Challenging the Boundaries of Medieval History: The Legacy of Timothy Reuter. Turnhout, Belgium: Brepols. pp. 51–80. ISBN 978-2-503-52359-0.
- Lyons, Adrian W.; Mackay, William A. (2007). "The Coinage of Æthelred I (865–871)". British Numismatic Journal. 77: 71–118. ISSN 0143-8956.
- Mason, Emma (2004). "Æthelnoth (d. 1038)". Oxford Dictionary of National Biography. Oxford University Press. doi:10.1093/ref:odnb/8912. ISBN 978-0-19-861412-8. (subscription, Wikipedia Library access or UK public library membership required)
- Miller, Sean (2004). "Æthelred [Ethelred] I (d. 871)". Oxford Dictionary of National Biography. Oxford University Press. doi:10.1093/ref:odnb/8913. ISBN 978-0-19-861412-8. (subscription, Wikipedia Library access or UK public library membership required)
- Naismith, Rory (2012). Money and Power in Anglo-Saxon England: The Southern English Kingdoms, 757–965. Cambridge, UK: Cambridge University Press. ISBN 978-1-107-66969-7.
- Nelson, Janet (1986). "'A King Across the Sea': Alfred in Continental Perspective". Transactions of the Royal Historical Society. 36: 45–68. doi:10.2307/3679059. ISBN 978-0-86193-109-5. JSTOR 3679059. S2CID 159863670.
- Nelson, Janet (1996). "Reconstructing a Royal Family: Reflections on Alfred from Asser, Chapter 2". In Wood, Ian; Lund, Niels (eds.). People and Places in Northern Europe 500–1600: Essays in Honour of Peter Hayes Sawyer. Woodbridge, UK: Boydell Press. pp. 48–66. ISBN 978-0851155470.
- Nelson, Janet (2004). "Æthelwulf (d. 858)". Oxford Dictionary of National Biography. Oxford University Press. doi:10.1093/ref:odnb/8921. ISBN 978-0-19-861412-8. (subscription, Wikipedia Library access or UK public library membership required)
- Peddie, John (1989). Alfred the Good Soldier. Bath, UK: Millstream Books. ISBN 978-0-948975-19-6.
- Smyth, Alfred P. (1995). King Alfred the Great. Oxford, UK: Oxford University Press. ISBN 0-19-822989-5.
- Stafford, Pauline (2003). "Succession and Inheritance: a Gendered Perspective on Alfred's Family History". In Reuter, Timothy (ed.). Alfred the Great. Aldershot, UK: Ashgate. pp. 251–64. ISBN 978-1-138-24830-4.
- Stenton, Frank M. (1971). Anglo-Saxon England (3rd ed.). Oxford: Oxford University Press. ISBN 978-0-19-280139-5.
- Swanton, Michael, ed. (2000). The Anglo-Saxon Chronicles. London: Phoenix. ISBN 978-1-84212-003-3.
- Thacker, Alan (2001). "Dynastic Monasteries and Family Cults". In Higham, N. J.; Hill, D. H. (eds.). Edward the Elder 899–924. Abingdon, UK: Routledge. pp. 248–63. ISBN 978-0-415-21497-1.
- Whitelock, Dorothy, ed. (1955). English Historical Documents c. 500–1042. Vol. 1. London: Eyre & Spottiswoode. OCLC 907945796.
- Wormald, Patrick (2001). "Kingship and Royal Property from Æthelwulf to Edward the Elder". In Higham, N. J.; Hill, D. H. (eds.). Edward the Elder 899–924. Abingdon, UK: Routledge. pp. 264–79. ISBN 978-0-415-21497-1.
- Wormald, Patrick (2006). "Alfred [Ælfred] (848/9–899)". Oxford Dictionary of National Biography. Oxford University Press. doi:10.1093/ref:odnb/183. ISBN 978-0-19-861412-8. (subscription, Wikipedia Library access or UK public library membership required)
- Yorke, Barbara (1990). Kings and Kingdoms of Early Anglo-Saxon England. London: Routledge. ISBN 978-0-415-16639-3.
- Yorke, Barbara (1995). Wessex in the Early Middle Ages. London: Leicester University Press. ISBN 978-0-7185-1856-1.
- Yorke, Barbara (1997). "Æthelwold and the Politics of the Tenth Century". In Yorke, Barbara (ed.). Bishop Æthelwold: His Career and Influence (reprint ed.). Woodbridge, UK: The Boydell Press. pp. 65–88. ISBN 978-0-85115-705-4.
- Yorke, Barbara (2001). "Edward as Ætheling". In Higham, N. J.; Hill, D. H. (eds.). Edward the Elder 899–924. Abingdon, UK: Routledge. pp. 25–39. ISBN 978-0-415-21497-1.
- Yorke, Barbara (2004). "Cerdic (fl. 6th cent.)". Oxford Dictionary of National Biography. Oxford University Press. doi:10.1093/ref:odnb/5003. ISBN 978-0-19-861412-8. (subscription, Wikipedia Library access or UK public library membership required)

Æthelred I of Wessex House of Wessex Born: c. 845/848 Died: April 871
Regnal titles
Preceded by Æthelberht	King of Wessex; 865–871	Succeeded by Alfred the Great
