= Battle of Basing =

Battle between Vikings and West Saxons in 871

Coordinates: 51.2704°N 1.0473°W

- Part of the Viking invasions of England
Date	c. 22 January 871
Location	Old Basing, Hampshire
Result	Viking victory

Belligerents
West Saxons	Vikings

Commanders and leaders
Æthelred and Alfred	

The Battle of Basing was a victory of a Viking army over the West Saxons at the royal estate of Basing in Hampshire on about 22 January 871.

In late December 870 the Vikings invaded Wessex and occupied Reading. Several battles followed in quick succession, Englefield, a West Saxon victory, Reading, a Viking victory and Ashdown on about 8 January, a West Saxon victory. Two weeks later, King Æthelred and his brother, the future King Alfred the Great, were defeated at Basing. There was then a lull of two months until the Battle of Meretun, when the Vikings again prevailed. Soon after Easter, which fell on 15 April in that year, Æthelred died and was succeeded by Alfred.

The Battle of Basing can be dated because Bishop Heahmund of Sherborne died in the Battle of Meretun, and it is known that he died on 22 March 871. The Anglo-Saxon Chronicle records that the Battle of Basing was two months earlier, dating it to 22 January, Ashdown fourteen days before that on 8 January, Reading four days earlier on 4 January, Englefield another four days earlier on 31 December 870 and the arrival of the Vikings in Reading three days earlier on 28 December. However, as the two month interval between Meretun and Basing is probably not exact, the earlier dates are approximate.
