= Englefield, Berkshire =

Coordinates: 51.443°N 1.1°W

Englefield
- Village and civil parish
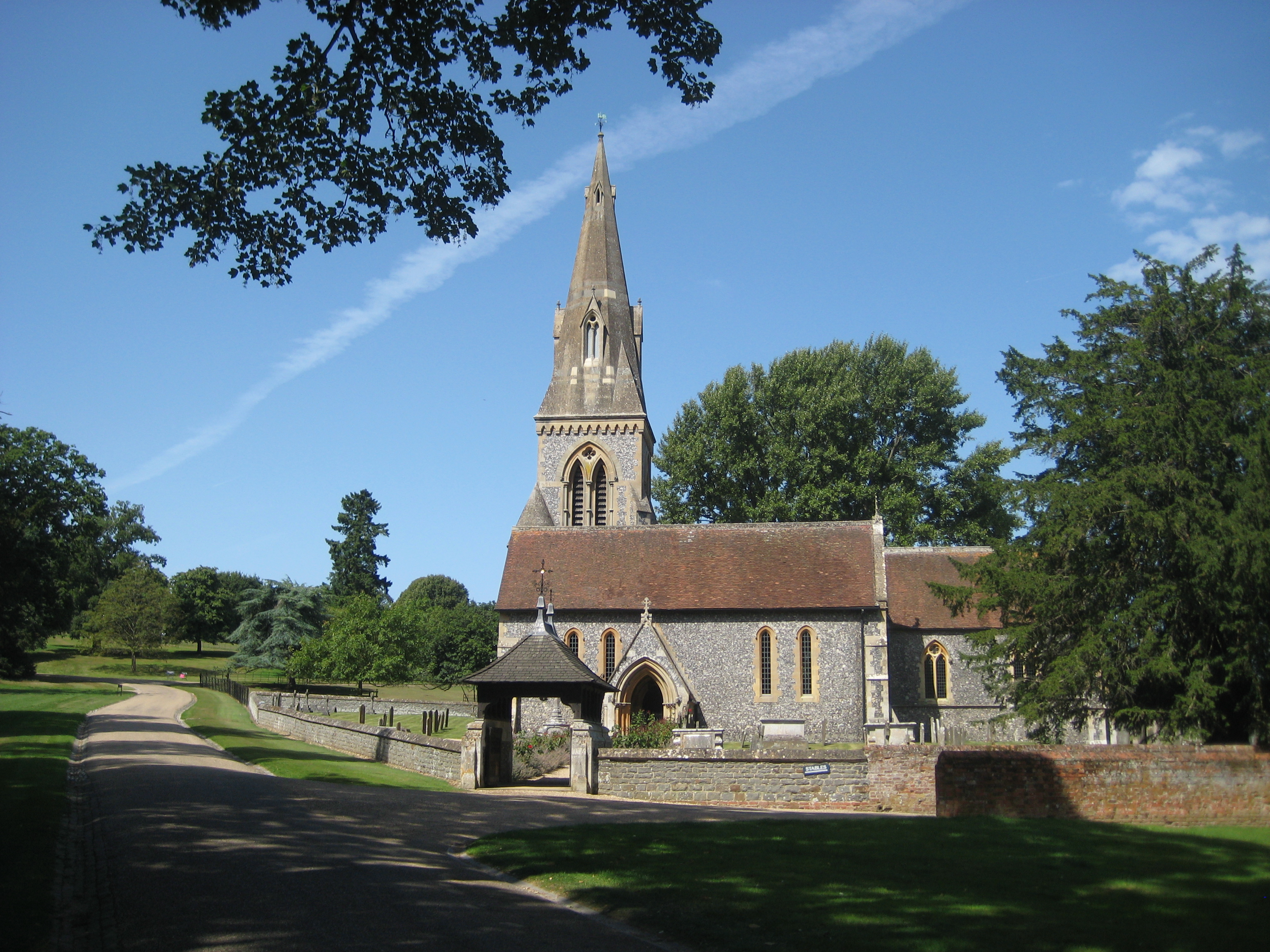
- St Mark's Church

- Location within Berkshire
- Area: 9.25 km^{2} (3.57 sq mi)
- Population: 286 (2011 census)
  - Density: 31/km^{2} (80/sq mi)
- OS grid reference: SU6272
- Civil parish: Englefield
- Unitary authority: West Berkshire
- Ceremonial county: Berkshire
- Region: South East
- Country: England
- Sovereign state: United Kingdom
- Post town: READING
- Postcode district: RG7
- Police: Thames Valley
- Fire: Royal Berkshire
- Ambulance: South Central
- UK Parliament: Reading West and Mid Berkshire

Englefield is a village and civil parish in the English county of Berkshire. The village is mostly within the bounds of the private walled estate of Englefield House. The village is in the district of West Berkshire, close to Reading.

== Toponymy ==
The place-name 'Englefield' is first attested in the Anglo Saxon Chronicle for 871, where it appears as Engla feld. It appears as Englefel in the Domesday Book of 1086, and as Englefeld in the Feet of Fines for 1196. The name indicates settlement by the Angles in Saxon territory.

== Battle of Englefield ==
In 870, the village was the site of the Battle of Englefield. This was fought between the Anglo-Saxons, under Æthelwulf, Ealdorman of Berkshire, and the Danes, and resulted in a resounding victory for the Saxons. The battle was the first of a series in the winter of 870–1. The village may have been named after the battle, Englefield meaning "English field".

== Englefield House ==
Englefield House was the home of the Englefield family, supposedly from the time of King Edgar and certainly until the Elizabethan era when the present building was erected. The house eventually passed to the Benyon family, as part of the largest privately owned estate in West Berkshire.

== Village ==
In the late 19th century, Richard Fellowes Benyon rebuilt the villagers' houses as a model estate village and provided them with such amenities as a swimming pool, soup kitchen and a new school. Today the estate, owned by a family company, the Englefield Estate, covers some 14,000 acres (5,700 ha). The village relies on and contributes to the amenities and organisations in Theale and Tilehurst, which bound it to the south and east, as well as Reading.

== Demography ==
2011 Published Statistics: Population, home ownership and extracts from Physical Environment, surveyed in 2005
Output area	Homes owned outright	Owned with a loan	Socially rented	Privately rented	Other	km^{2} roads	km^{2} water	km^{2} domestic gardens	Usual residents	km^{2}
Civil parish	14	8	9	65	28	0.147	0.109	0.124	286	9.25
