= Battle of Strangford Lough =

Battle fought in Ireland in 877

- Part of the Viking activities in Ireland
Date	877
Location	near Strangford Lough, County Down, Ireland
Result	Fair Heathen victory

Belligerents
Dark Heathens	Fair Heathens

Commanders and leaders
Halfdan Ragnarsson †	Bardur Ivarsson (WIA)

The Battle of Strangford Lough was fought in 877 between two groups of rival Vikings described by the Irish Annals as the "fair heathens" and the "dark heathens". (Note: The terms "fair foreigners" and "dark foreigners" are sometimes also used for these two groups.) The Annals of Ulster describe "Albann", a figure usually identified with Halfdan Ragnarsson, a leader of the Great Heathen Army, as king of the "dark heathens", and Cogad Gáedel re Gallaib identifies Bárid mac Ímair, King of Dublin as the leader of the "fair heathens". All accounts agree Halfdan was killed in the battle, and Cogad Gáedel re Gallaib adds that Bárid was wounded in it.

== Background ==
Sometime in the 850s or 860s the three Viking brothers Ímar, Amlaíb Conung and Auisle began to rule as kings in Dublin. Ímar died in 873, Amlaíb in 874, and Auisle in 867; with Bárid, son of Ímar probably succeeding them as king. Some scholars have also suggested that Oistin, son of Amlaíb ruled with Bárid as co-king. According to some scholars Halfdan Ragnarsson was brother to Ímar, Amlaíb Conung and Auisle, and hence uncle to Bárid and Oistin. Halfdan is not described as ruling in Ireland like his brothers in any contemporary source, but he is instead described as one of the leaders of the Great Heathen Army which invaded the Anglo-Saxon kingdoms of England from 865 onwards. Halfdan is identified by some as a brother of the three kings of Dublin because in the Anglo-Saxon Chronicle he is described as the brother of another leader of the Great Heathen Army named Ívarr. This Ívarr is often considered the same as Ímar, primarily because Ímar is absent from Irish records during the period Ívarr is described as a leader of the Great Heathen Army. According to the later Norse sagas Halfdan was the son of the legendary Viking Ragnar Lodbrok, but the historicity of Ragnar is uncertain and the identification of Ragnar as the father of Halfdan is not to be relied upon.

The main historical sources for this period are the Norse sagas and the Irish annals. Some of the annals, such as the Annals of Ulster are believed to be contemporary accounts, whereas the sagas were written down at dates much later than the events they describe and are considered far less reliable. A few of the annals such as the Fragmentary Annals of Ireland and the Annals of the Four Masters were also complied at later dates, in part from more contemporary material and in part from fragments of sagas. According to Downham: "apart from these additions [of saga fragments], Irish chronicles are considered by scholars to be largely accurate records, albeit partisan in their presentation of events".

== Battle ==
The Annals of Ulster record a battle taking place in 877:

A skirmish at Loch Cuan between the fair heathens and the dark heathens, in which Albann, king of the dark heathens, fell. (Note: The Annals of the Four Masters and the Chronicon Scotorum offer almost identical accounts.)

According to South "there is now general agreement that Halfdan [Ragnarson] is identical with Albann". Albann is mentioned only one other time in the annals; in 875 he is named as the killer of Oistin mac Amlaíb, possible co-king of Dublin. Assuming Albann and Halfdan to be the same person, and assuming Halfdan to be the brother of Ímar, this makes Oistin's death nepoticide. Downham suggests this familial connection indicates a motive for the murder; it was part of a dynastic squabble for control of the kingdom. Downham also suggests the squabble continued until 877, of which the battle described by the Annals of Ulster was the culmination. The Cogad Gáedel re Gallaib expands on the Annals of Ulster account: (Note: For a discussion of the historical value of Cogad Gáedel re Gallaib see Ní Mhaonaigh.)

A battle was fought between themselves, viz., between the Fair Gentiles and the Black Gentiles, that is to say between Barith (Note: Barith is an alternative spelling of Bárid) and Ragnall's son, in which fell Ragnall's son and many with him; but Barith was wounded there.

In this account Halfdan is to be identified with "Ragnall's son". However, this is problematic since in the Fragmentary Annals the name of Ímar, Amlaíb, and Auisle's father is Gofraid, not Ragnall. It is possible Ragnall is simply a rendering of Ragnar, meaning Ragnar Lodbrok, who is named as Halfdan's father in the later (and more historically dubious) sagas.
