= Æthelhelm =

Elder son of Æthelred I, King of Wessex

- Died: c. 890
- House: Wessex
- Father: Æthelred I
- Mother: Wulfthryth

Æthelhelm or Æþelhelm (fl. 880s – c. 890) was the elder of two known sons of Æthelred I, King of Wessex from 865 to 871, and Queen Wulfthryth.

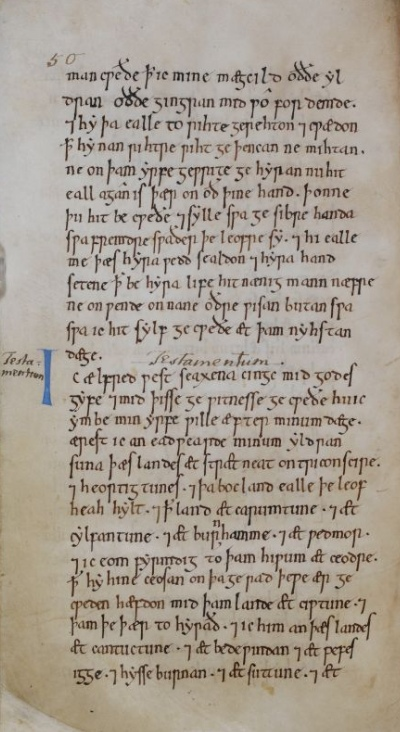
Will of Alfred the Great, AD 873–888, granting land to Æthelhelm (11th-century copy, British Library Stowe MS 944, ff. 29v–33r)

Æthelred's sons were infants when their father died in 871, and the throne passed to their uncle, Alfred the Great. The only certain record of Æthelhelm is as a beneficiary in Alfred's will in the mid 880s, and he probably died at some time in the next decade. Following Alfred's death in 899 Æthelhelm's younger brother Æthelwold unsuccessfully contested the succession.

Pauline Stafford identifies him with the Æthelhelm who served as Ealdorman of Wiltshire, the probable father of Ælfflæd, who became Edward the Elder's second wife about 899. However, Barbara Yorke rejects this idea, arguing that it does not appear to have been the practice for æthelings (princes of the royal dynasty who were eligible to be king) to become ealdormen, that a grant from Alfred to Ealdorman Æthelhelm makes no reference to kinship between them, and that the hostile reception to King Eadwig's marriage to Ælfgifu, his third cousin once removed, shows that a marriage between Edward and his first cousin once removed would have been forbidden as incestuous.

The historian Æthelweard (died c. 998) claimed descent from King Æthelred I and may therefore be a descendant of Æthelhelm. Some genealogists have suggested that the Godwins descended from Æthelred I through Æthelhelm, but almost all historians dismiss this idea.

== See also ==
- House of Wessex family tree
