= Whistley Green =

Village in Berkshire, England

Coordinates: 51.461088°N 0.860936°W

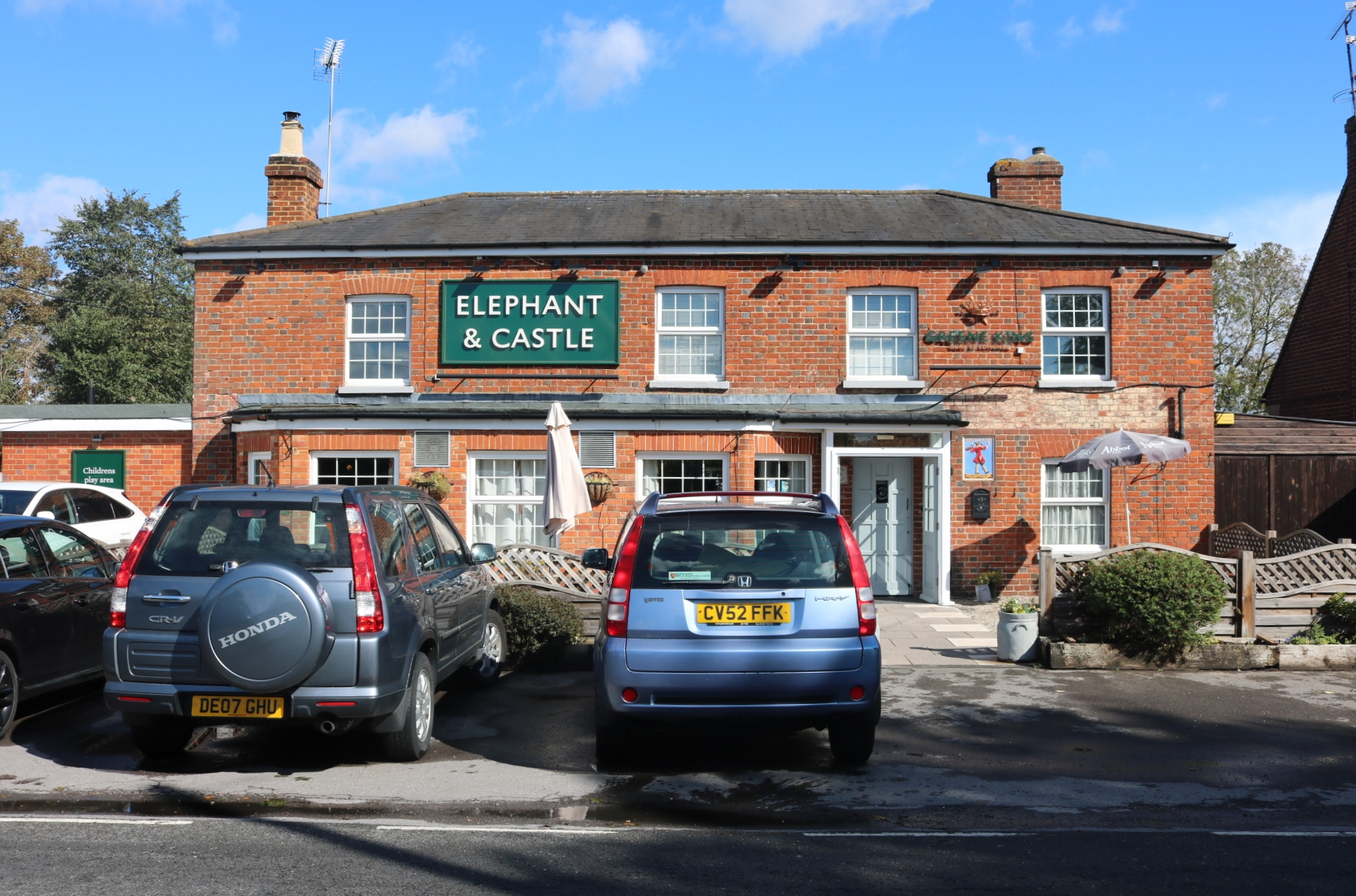
- The Elephant & Castle

- Location within Berkshire
- OS grid reference: SU793742
- Unitary authority: Wokingham
- Ceremonial county: Berkshire
- Region: South East
- Country: England
- Sovereign state: United Kingdom
- Post town: READING
- Postcode district: RG10
- Dialling code: 0118
- Police: Thames Valley
- Fire: Royal Berkshire
- Ambulance: South Central
- UK Parliament: Berkshire

Whistley Green is a village in Berkshire, England, and part of the civil parish of St Nicholas Hurst. The settlement lies near to the A321 road, and is located approximately 4.5 miles (7.2 km) east of Reading, and 1.2 miles (2 km) south of Twyford.
