= Wulfthryth of Wessex =

9th-century Queen of Wessex

Wulfthryth
- Queen consort of Wessex
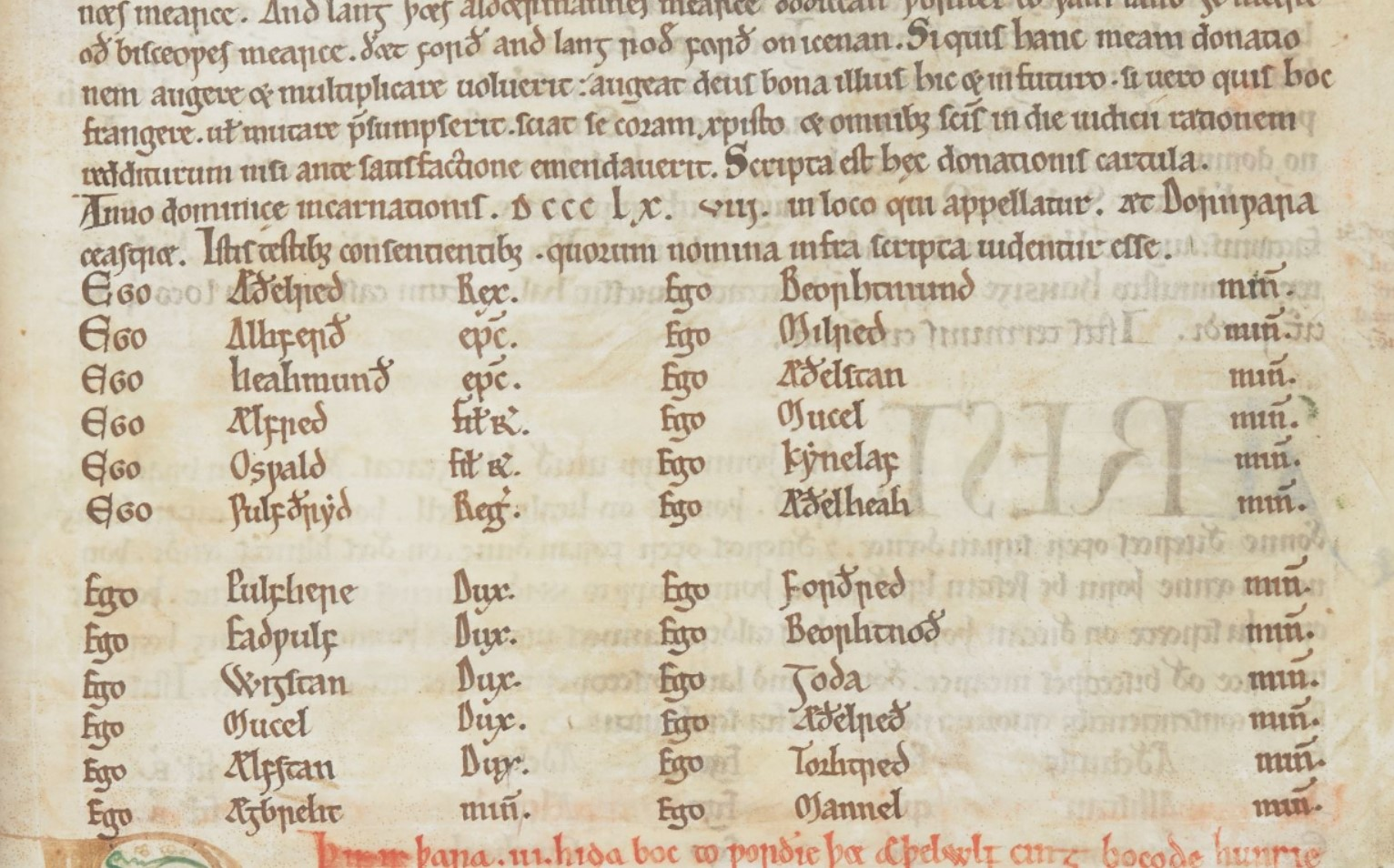
- The witness list of charter S 340, with Wulfthryth's name in sixth position.
- Born: fl. 868
- Spouse: Æthelred I, King of Wessex
- Issue: Æthelhelm; Æthelwold

Wulfthryth (fl. 868) was a queen of Wessex, the wife of King Æthelred I.

Little is known of Wulfthryth. She witnessed a charter of 868, in which she has the title of regina ("queen"). The charter appears in the Codex Wintoniensis, but Wulfthryth is otherwise unrecorded in primary sources. Stephanie Hollis notes that 868 was the year of Alfred the Great's marriage to a Mercian and that "Wulfthryth's name looks Mercian". Wulfthryth may be related to the Ealdorman Wulfhere who was granted land in Wiltshire by King Æthelred I in 869 and had his land confiscated for treason by King Alfred He is identified incorrectly as "Wulfhere princeps" in the 869 charter and his name appears directly below that of "Wulthryth regina".

Wulfthryth had two sons, Æthelhelm (c. 865 – c. 890) and Æthelwold (died 902), who were too young to succeed their father when he died in 871, and Alfred became king. Æthelwold unsuccessfully led Æthelwold's Revolt, disputing the throne with his cousin Edward the Elder after Alfred's death in 899. Keynes & Lapidge suggest that Wulthryth may have been the mother of the "Oswald filius regis" who subscribes to a charter in 868, and whom may be the father of the "Osferth" that is mentioned in King Alfred's will, and later is referred to as an Ealdorman in charters from King Edward's reign.
