= Halfdan Ragnarsson =

Viking leader of the Great Heathen Army (died 877)

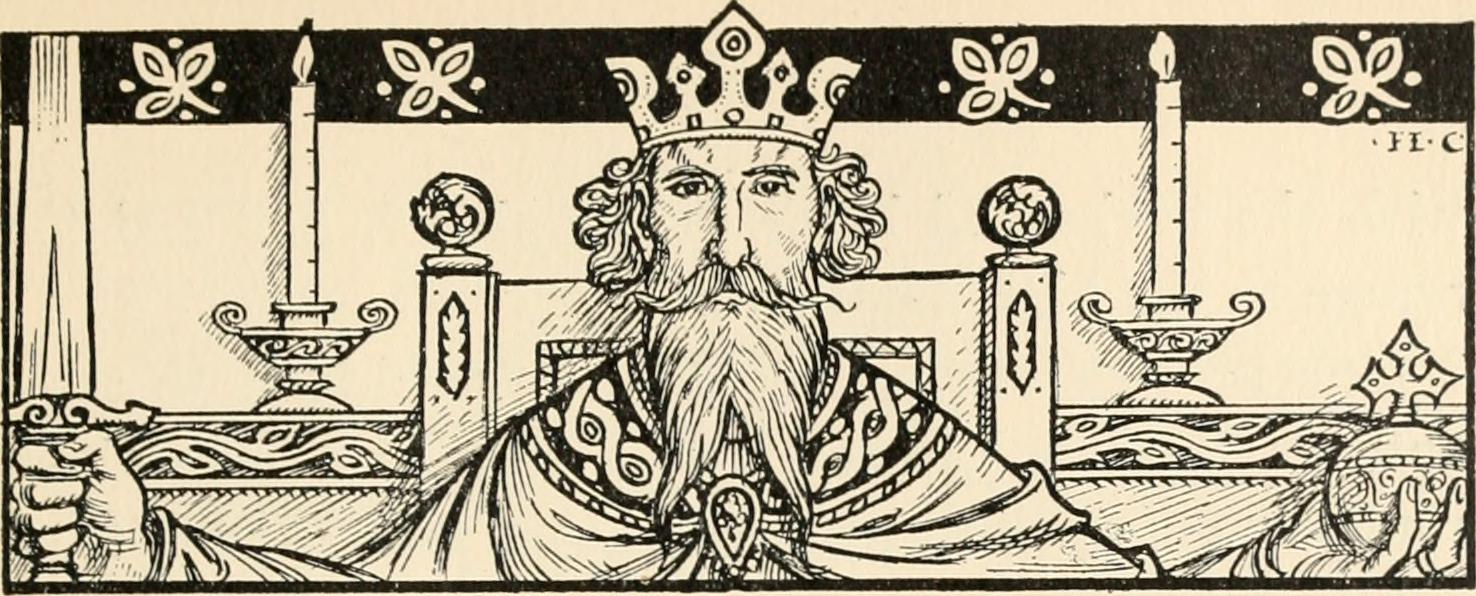

King of Jorvik
- Reign: 876–877
- Predecessor: Ricsige
- Successor: Ecgberht II

King of Dublin
- Reign: 875–877
- Predecessor: Eystein Olafsson
- Successor: Bárid

Co-ruler of Denmark
- Reign: 871–877
- Predecessor: Bagsecg
- Successor: Sigurd Snake-in-the-Eye
- Died: 877; Strangford Lough
- Father: possibly Ragnar Lodbrok, or whoever was historical basis for the possibly legendary character
- Mother: possibly Aslaug, or historical basis for a legendary character

Halfdan Ragnarsson (Old Norse: Hálfdan; Old English: Halfdene or Healfdene; Old Irish: Albann; died 877), was a Viking leader and a commander of the Great Heathen Army that invaded the Anglo-Saxon kingdoms of England starting in 865. The Anglo-Saxon Chronicle describes him as a "heathen king".

Halfdan was one of six sons of Ragnar Lodbrok named in Norse sagas; his brothers and half-brothers included Björn Ironside, Ivar the Boneless, Sigurd Snake-in-the-Eye, Ubba and Hvitserk. Because Halfdan is not mentioned in any source that mentions Hvitserk, some scholars have suggested that they are the same individual – a possibility reinforced by the fact that Halfdan was a relatively common name among Vikings and Hvitserk "white shirt" may have been an epithet or nickname that distinguished Halfdan from other men by the same name.

Halfdan was the first Viking King of Northumbria and a pretender to the throne of the Kingdom of Dublin. It is also possible he was for a time co-ruler of Denmark with his brother Sigurd Snake-in-the-eye, because Frankish sources mention a certain Sigfred and Halfdan as rulers in 873. He died at the Battle of Strangford Lough in 877 trying to press his Irish claim.

== Biography ==
Halfdan was one of the leaders of the Great Heathen Army that invaded the Anglo-Saxon kingdom of East Anglia in 865. According to the Norse sagas, this invasion was organised by the sons of Ragnar Lodbrok (Halfdan being one of them), to wreak revenge against Ælla of Northumbria. Ælla had supposedly had Ragnar executed in 865 by throwing him in a snake pit, but the historicity of this explanation is unknown. The invaders are usually identified as Danes, although the tenth-century churchman Asser stated that the invaders came "de Danubia", which translates as "from the Danube"; the fact that the Danube is located in what was known in Latin as Dacia suggests that Asser actually intended Dania, a Latin term for Denmark.

In the autumn of 865, the Great Heathen Army landed in East Anglia, where they remained over the winter and secured horses. The following year the army moved northwards and invaded Northumbria, which was at that time in the middle of a civil war between Ælla and Osberht, opposing claimants for the Northumbrian throne. Late in 866, the army conquered the rich Northumbrian settlement of York. The following year, Ælla and Osberht made an alliance to retake the town. The attack was defeated, and both of them fell in the battle. With no obvious leader, Northumbrian resistance was crushed and the Danes installed a puppet-king, Ecgberht, to rule in their name and collect taxes for them.

Later in the year, the Army moved south and invaded the Kingdom of Mercia, capturing the town of Nottingham, where they spent the winter. The Mercian king, Burghred, responded by allying with the West Saxon King Æthelred, and with a combined force they laid siege to the town. The Anglo-Saxons were unable to recapture the city, but a truce was agreed whereby the Danes would withdraw to York. where they remained for over a year, gathering strength for further assaults.

The Danes returned to East Anglia in 869, this time intent on conquest. They seized Thetford with the intention of remaining there over the winter, but they were met by an East Anglian army. The East Anglian army was defeated and its commander, King Edmund, was slain. Medieval tradition identifies Edmund as a martyr who refused the Danes' demand to renounce Christ, and was killed for his steadfast Christianity. Ivar and Ubba are identified as the commanders of the Danes, and the killers of Edmund, and it is unknown what part, if any, Halfdan took.

Following the conquest of East Anglia, Ivar apparently left the Great Heathen Army – his name disappears from English records after 870. However, he is generally considered to be identical to Ímar, a Norse King of Dublin who died in 873. With Ivar in Ireland, Halfdan became the main commander of the Army, and in 870 he led it in an invasion of Wessex. Sometime after Ivar left the Army, a great number of Viking warriors arrived from Scandinavia, as part of the Great Summer Army, led by Bagsecg, bolstering the ranks of Halfdan's army. According to the Anglo-Saxon Chronicle, the Danes battled the West Saxons nine times, including at the Battle of Ashdown on 8 January 871. However, the West Saxons could not be defeated, and Halfdan accepted a truce from Alfred, newly crowned king of Wessex.

The Army retreated to the captured town of London and stayed there over the winter of 871/872. Coins minted in London during this period bear the name Halfdan, identifying him as its leader. In the autumn of 872, the Army returned to Northumbria to quell a revolt against its puppet-regent Ecgberht. However, this explanation for the army's move north has been challenged, and it has been suggested the relocation was a result of a war with Mercia. The Army overwintered at Torksey, and was then reported as being in the Repton district a year later. It conquered Mercia in 874, the Mercian King Burghred being deposed and replaced by a Danish-puppet regent, Ceolwulf.

Following this victory, the Army split in two – one half under Guthrum heading south to continue fighting against Wessex, the other half under Halfdan heading north to fight against the Picts and Britons of Strathclyde. According to the Annals of Ulster, Eystein Olafsson, King of Dublin was "deceitfully" killed in 875 by "Albann", a figure generally agreed to be Halfdan. His brother Ivar had ruled the city prior to his death in 873 and it appears Halfdan's campaigning was an attempt to regain his brother's lost kingdom. Halfdan did not remain in Ireland: in 875, he and his forces returned to Northumbria, sailing up the River Tyne, sacking monasteries at Tynemouth and Jarrow, before setting up camp at Gateshead. They settled an area largely coextensive with the old Kingdom of Deira, with the northern part of Northumbria remaining under Anglian rule. Sources sometimes title Halfdan King of Jórvík, beginning in 876.

Halfdan's rule of Dublin was not secure, and he was deposed while away in York. He returned to Ireland in 877 to try to recapture the city, but he was met with an army of "Fair Heathens" – a contentious term usually considered to mean the Viking population who had been in Ireland the longest, as opposed to the newly arrived "Dark Heathens", of whom Halfdan was one. The forces met at the Battle of Strangford Lough, where Halfdan was slain. Those of Halfdan's men who survived the battle returned to Northumbria via Scotland, fighting a battle along the way in which Constantine I, King of the Picts was killed. The Vikings of Northumbria remained kingless until 883, when Guthred was made king there.

== Historicity ==
Halfdan and his supposed brothers are, individually, considered historical figures but it is debated whether they were all related.

Contemporarily, Halfdan and Ivar are named as brothers by Asser and the Anglo Saxon Chronicle when their other unnamed sibling - later identified as Ubba by Anglo Norman chronicler Geoffrey Gaimar - was killed at the Battle of Cynwit.

Halfdan is also thought to be the same as the Danish king mentioned in the Annals of Fulda in 873 ruling along with his brother Sigfred - most likely Sigurd Snake in the Eye. Opinion regarding his supposed father is divided. According to Hilda Ellis Davidson, writing in 1979, "certain scholars in recent years have come to accept at least part of Ragnar's story as based on historical fact". Katherine Holman, on the other hand, concludes that "although his sons are historical figures, there is no evidence that Ragnar himself ever lived, and he seems to be an amalgam of several different historical figures and pure literary invention."

== In popular culture ==
- In the 2020 video game, Assassin's Creed: Valhalla, Halfdan appears along with his brothers, Ivar and Ubba. In the game, he is seen warring against the Picts in Northumbria and reaches out to the game's protagonist, Eivor, who helps him rat out a traitor, and later sees him crowned king of Northumbria. He is portrayed by Norwegian actor, Jeppe Beck Laursen, who also portrays Thor in the game.
- Halfdan also appears as a playable historical character in the video game Crusader Kings III, developed by Paradox Interactive. He is playable in the game's 867 AD start date and starts at war with Ælla of Northumbria, referencing his actions as one of the leaders of the Great Heathen army.

== Sources ==
- Ashley, Mike (7 June 2012). The Mammoth Book of British Kings and Queens. Little, Brown Book Group. ISBN 978-1-4721-0113-6.
- Costambeys, M (2004). "Hálfdan (d. 877)". Oxford Dictionary of National Biography (online ed.). Oxford University Press. doi:10.1093/ref:odnb/49260. (Subscription, Wikipedia Library access or UK public library membership required.) Subscription or UK public library membership required.
- Davidson, Hilda Roderick Ellis, ed. (1979). Gesta Danorum [Saxo Grammaticus: The history of the Danes: books I–IX]. Vol. 1 & 2. Translated by Peter Fisher. Cambridge: D. S. Brewer. Chapter introduction commentaries. ISBN 978-0-85991-502-1.
- Downham, Clare (2007). Viking Kings of Britain and Ireland: The Dynasty of Ívarr to A.D. 1014. Dunedin Academic Press. ISBN 978-1-9037-6589-0.
- Downham, Clare (2013). "Annals, Armies, and Artistry: 'The Anglo-Saxon Chronicle', 865–96". No Horns on their Helmets? Essays on the Insular Viking-age. Celtic, Anglo-Saxon, and Scandinavian Studies (series vol. 1). The Centre for Anglo-Saxon Studies and The Centre for Celtic Studies, University of Aberdeen. pp. 9–37. ISBN 978-0-9557720-1-6. ISSN 2051-6509.
- Forte, A; Oram, RD; Pedersen, F (2005). Viking Empires. Cambridge: Cambridge University Press. ISBN 978-0-521-82992-2.
- Gransden, A (2000) [1996]. Historical Writing in England. Vol. 1, c. 500 to c. 1307. London: Routledge. ISBN 0-415-15124-4.
- Grundy, John (2022). History of Northumberland. Newcastle upon Tyne: Tyne Bridge Publishing. ISBN 9781838280970.
- Holman, Katherine (July 2003). Historical dictionary of the Vikings. Lanham, Maryland: Scarecrow Press. ISBN 978-0-8108-4859-7.
- Holman, Katherine (26 April 2012). The Northern Conquest: Vikings in Britain and Ireland. Andrews UK Limited. ISBN 978-1-908493-53-8.
- Hooper, Nicholas Hooper; Bennett, Matthew (1996). The Cambridge Illustrated Atlas of Warfare: the Middle Ages. Cambridge University Press. ISBN 0-521-44049-1.
- Jones, Gwyn (1984). A History of the Vikings. Oxford University Press. ISBN 0-19-215882-1.
- Keynes, S (2014). "Appendix I: Rulers of the English, c.450–1066". In Lapidge, M; Blair, J; Keynes, S; et al. (eds.). The Wiley Blackwell Encyclopedia of Anglo-Saxon England (2nd ed.). Chichester: John Wiley & Sons. pp. 521–538. ISBN 978-0-470-65632-7.
- Kirby, D. P. (2000). The Earliest English Kings. London and New York: Routledge. ISBN 978-0-415-24211-0.
- Lapidge, Michael; Blair, John; Keynes, Simon; Scragg, Donald (2 October 2013). The Wiley Blackwell Encyclopedia of Anglo-Saxon England. John Wiley & Sons. ISBN 978-1-118-31609-2.
- "Laud MS Misc. 636". Bodleian Library.
- Malam, John (6 February 2012). Yorkshire, A Very Peculiar History. Andrews UK Limited. ISBN 978-1-908759-50-4.
- Mostert, M (1987). The Political Theology of Abbo of Fleury: A Study of the Ideas about Society and Law of the Tenth-century Monastic Reform Movement. Middeleeuwse studies en bronnen (series vol. 2). Hilversum: Uitgeverij Verloren. ISBN 90-6550-209-2.
- Munch, Peter Andreas (1926). Norse Mythology: Legends of Gods and Heroes. The American-Scandinavian Foundation.
- South, Ted Johnson (2002). Historia de Sancto Cuthberto. Boydell & Brewer. ISBN 978-0-85991-627-1.
- Swanton, M, ed. (1998) [1996]. The Anglo-Saxon Chronicle. New York: Routledge. ISBN 0-415-92129-5.
- Venning, Timothy (30 January 2014). The Kings & Queens of Anglo-Saxon England. Amberley Publishing Limited. ISBN 978-1-4456-2459-4.
- Woolf, Alex, The Age of the Sea-Kings: 900–1300 in Omand, Donald (ed.) (2006) The Argyll Book, Birlinn, ISBN 978-1-8415-8480-5
