= Heahmund =

9th-century Bishop of Sherborne

Saint Heahmund
- Bishop of Sherborne
- Appointed: between 867 and 868
- Term ended: 871
- Predecessor: Eahlstan
- Successor: Æthelheah

Orders
- Consecration: between 867 and 868

Personal details
- Died: 22 March 871 Battle of Marton
- Denomination: Catholic

Sainthood
- Feast day: March 22
- Venerated in: Catholic Church
- Title as Saint: Bishop and martyr

Heahmund (or Hamund) was a medieval Bishop of Sherborne. A warrior bishop, he was killed fighting against the Danes for the Anglo-Saxon King Æthelred I of Wessex and his brother, the future King Alfred the Great.

Heahmund was consecrated in 867 or 868. He died at the Battle of Meretun in 871. As his death is assigned to 22 March in the English calendar of saints, the battle and his death can be dated to 22 March 871. He was buried at Keynsham in Somerset. In the Catholic Church, he is venerated as a martyr with his feast day on 22 March.

Christian titles
Preceded by Eahlstan	Bishop of Sherborne c. 868–871	Succeeded by Æthelheah
