= Battle of Meretun =

9th-century battle in England

- Part of the Viking invasions of England
Date	22 March 871
Location	Wessex
Result	Viking victory

Belligerents
Wessex	Vikings

Commanders and leaders
King Æthelred; Alfred the Great; Heahmund	

The Battle of Meretun (or Merton) between a West Saxon army led by King Æthelred and his brother, the future King Alfred the Great, and a Viking army took place on 22 March 871 at an unknown location in Wessex, probably in one of the modern counties of Dorset, Hampshire, or Wiltshire.

== The battle ==
According to the manuscript C of the Anglo-Saxon Chronicle:

King Æthelred and his brother Alfred fought against the army at Basing, and there the Vikings had the victory. And two months later, King Æthelred and his brother Alfred fought against the army at Meretun, and they were in two divisions; and they put both to flight and were victorious far on into the day; and there was a great slaughter on both sides; and the Danes had possession of the battlefield. And Bishop Heahmund was killed there and many important men. And after this battle a great summer army came to Reading. And afterwards, at Easter, King Æthelred died.

The battle is dated by the death of Heahmund, Bishop of Sherborne. His feast day is listed in the English calendar of saints as 22 March, indicating that he died on that date.

== Location ==
Various names and spellings similar to Marton or Meretun have been used for the site of the engagement. The location is unknown, but there are two possibilities based on the location names used in the original text sources. One is in the vicinity of ancient Merdon Castle, which is in Hursley parish near Winchester. The other is the village of Marten in Wiltshire, although there is a similarly named village called Marden, also in Wiltshire.
