= Æthelwulf of Berkshire =

Saxon ealdorman (before 825 – 871)

Æthelwulf of Berkshire (before 825 – 4 January, 871) was a Saxon ealdorman. In 860 he and other men of Berkshire fought off a band of pirates near Winchester, Hampshire. Later he mustered a force of 1400 men against an army of Danes, won the 31 December 870 Battle of Englefield on behalf of the then kingdom of Wessex. He received a land grant in 843/44 from Brihtwulf, king of Mercia; and lost his life at the Battle of Reading.

Æthelweard, in his account of the battle, reveals a curious fact about Æthelwulf, master of the art of the ambush: he was a Mercian and not a West Saxon. Not only this, Æthelweard says:

"In fact, the body of the dux (leader) mentioned above was carried away secretly and taken into Mercia to the place called Northworthig, but Derby in the Danish tongue."
