= Battle of Chippenham =

878 battle between Vikings and Wessex

- Part of Viking invasions of England
Date	January 878
Location	Chippenham, Wiltshire, England 51.4585°N 2.1158°W
Result	Viking victory

Belligerents
Great Heathen Army	Wessex

Commanders and leaders
Guthrum	Alfred the Great

Strength
5,000	Unknown. At least 300 of Alfred's Hearthweru guard deployed.

Casualties and losses
Unknown	Heavy
- Modern day Chippenham shown within Wiltshire

The Battle of Chippenham was a January 878 battle between a Viking army led by Guthrum, and an Anglo-Saxon army led by Alfred the Great. The Vikings forced Alfred to flee Chippenham and managed temporarily to gain control over most of Wessex.

The battle was part of a coordinated strike on Wessex led by Guthrum, breaking an earlier truce between the two sides. Alfred, spending the winter at Chippenham, was without his army and was forced to flee to Athelney.

Following the Anglo Saxon victory at Cynwit by Odda, Ealdorman of Devon, Alfred managed to muster his forces and reclaim Wessex following the Battle of Edington in May 878. Guthrum would not attack Wessex again, agreeing to the Treaty of Wedmore. Alfred would then reorganise the army of Wessex to ensure there was always a standing force ready to meet a threat.

== Background ==
The Vikings first started raiding the British coast towards the end of the eighth century, with monasteries such as Lindisfarne in northern Britain being attacked. These raids would continue and in the 860s Viking armies arrived in Britain with the intention of conquest.

The Great Heathen Army of Vikings first arrived in 865 and within a decade they had conquered all the Anglo-Saxon kingdoms of East Anglia, Mercia, Northumberland and Wessex. Shortly before Alfred the Great was named king in 871, the Vikings had also attacked Wessex where King Æthelred I of Wessex defeated them at the Battle of Ashdown. Despite this victory, Alfred was still forced to pay off the Vikings to prevent subsequent invasions.

In 874 the Viking army divided, with a contingent under Guthrum heading south along the coast towards Wessex, and a supply fleet sailing in support. In 875 or 877, following a storm which caused the loss of this fleet, the Vikings were surrounded by Alfred at Exeter and forced to leave Wessex after an exchange of hostages was made as a sign of good faith. This truce would be broken in 878, when the Vikings launched a coordinated attack led by Guthrum from East Anglia, and by Ubba who appeared in the Severn.

== Battle ==
=== Anglo-Saxons ===
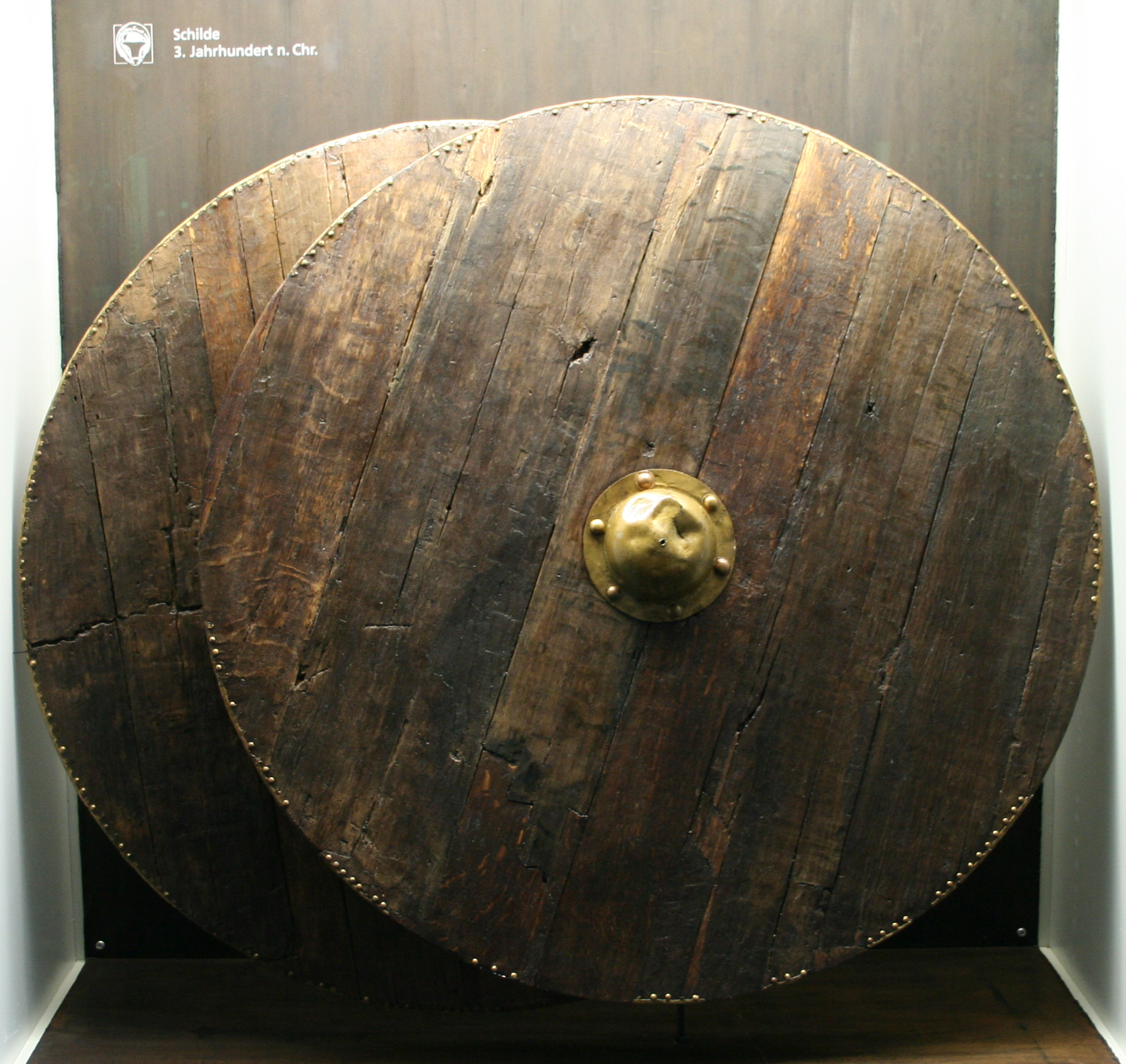
Two round, wooden shields from Thorsberg moor; dating to the 3rd century CE, they are similar to the shields used by the Anglo-Saxons

At this time Wessex was defended by the fyrd, a force made up of the lords and commoners of the realm and raised on an ad hoc basis. It took time to assemble a fighting force, and this system was intended to allow for short, decisive engagements. It was necessary to disband this force once the campaign was over. These men were typically armed with spears, although wealthier men might have carried a sword. For armour, the fyrd wore a conical helmet and carried a round shield, with wealthier men owning a chain mail coat.

=== Vikings ===
The weaponry of the Vikings varied according to their social class. Most would have carried a spear, shield and an axe or short knife. Wealthier Vikings would have also carried javelins, and might have had a helmet. It is thought armour was limited to nobility and professional warriors. The tactics of the Vikings were to take defensible sites such as royal estates, improve upon the defences, and raid the surrounding land from this base, avoiding confrontations with superior forces. These tactics would work well against the Anglo-Saxons who were unused to the siege warfare required to take these fortified sites, and whose logistical system was designed for short campaigns.

=== Chippenham ===
Alfred was wintering at his royal estates near Chippenham, when Guthrum surprised him and launched an attack just after New Year. With the fyrd not assembled Alfred was forced to flee and the Vikings were able to take Chippenham. Guthrum's onslaught occurred when the Saxon soldiers were celebrating Epiphany and completely wrecked Alfred's army, killing many warriors and scattering the rest. Some of the survivors fled across the English Channel to France.

== Aftermath ==
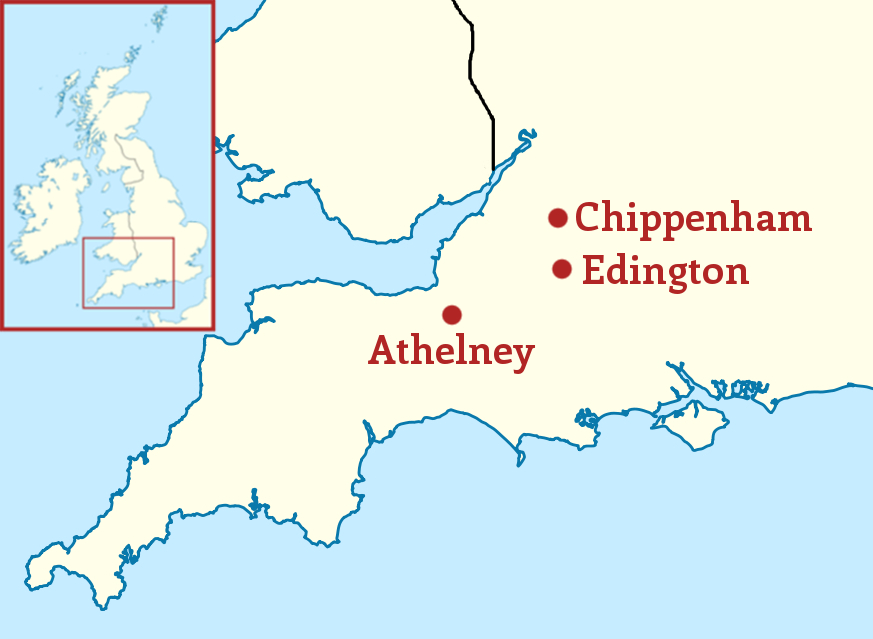
Relative locations of Chippenham, Athelney and Edington

Following his defeat at Chippenham, Alfred was forced to flee to the Island of Athelney, and the Vikings began ruling all of Wessex. From Athelney, Alfred would gather his forces and in May would defeat Guthrum at the Battle of Edington. Combined with Ubba's defeat to Odda, Ealdorman of Devon at the Battle of Cynwit earlier in the year, this would allow Alfred to retake Wessex. Following the Treaty of Wedmore, Guthrum was baptised and left Wessex.

Learning from his defeat, Alfred would reorganise the military structure of Wessex, ensuring that there would always be some troops in the field to defend the kingdom. When the Vikings attacked Wessex again 13 years later, they would find it defended by a mobile standing army able to counter the threat. This was to be achieved by rotating the fighting men over time, ensuring that there were always some at home to defend their own lands.

== Sources ==
- Arnold-Baker, Charles (2001). "Vikings (c. 720 - 1100)". The Companion to British History, Routledge (2nd ed.). London, UK: Charles Arnold-Baker, Routledge. ISBN 0415185831.
- Eggenberger, David (1985). An Encyclopedia of Battles. New York, N.Y.: Dover Publications Inc. ISBN 0-486-24913-1.
- Halfond, Gregory I. (2015). The Medieval Way of War: Studies in Medieval Military History in Honor of Bernard S. Bachrach. Ashgate Publishing, Ltd. ISBN 978-1-4724-1960-6.
- Hill, Paul (27 September 2019). "5 Key Weapons of the Anglo-Saxon Period". History Hit.
- James, Edward (29 March 2011). "The Vikings, 800 to 1066". BBC History. BBC.
- Johnson, Ben. "Ancient British Weapons and Armour, up to 1066". Historic UK.
- Overy, Richard (2014). A History of War in 100 Battles. Oxford University Press. ISBN 978-0-19-939071-7.

== Bibliography ==
- "Alfred". Encyclopedia Britannica.
- Chesterton, G. K. (1993). The Ballad of the White Horse. Ignatius Press. ISBN 978-1-68149-048-9.
