= Ubbi =

Ubbi, Ubbe or Ubbo was the name of three warriors in Norse mythology and early Scandinavian history.

- A legendary Danish champion, see Hrærekr Ringslinger.
- Ubba, a ninth century Viking

Ubbo can also refer to:

- Hippo Regius
