= Battle of Cynwit =

878 battle between West Saxons and Vikings

- Part of the Viking invasions of England
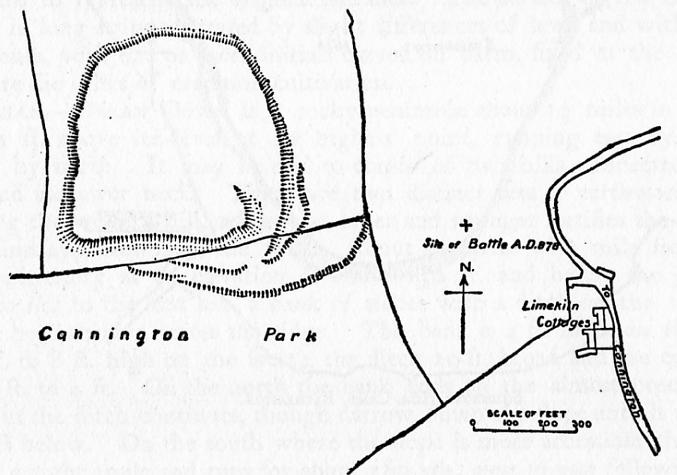
- Cannington hill fort, a possible site of the battle
Date	878
Location	Uncertain
Result	West Saxon victory

Belligerents
West Saxons	Vikings

Commanders and leaders
Odda, Ealdorman of Devon	Ubba †

Strength
Unknown	1,200

Casualties and losses
Few	800

The Battle of Cynwit (Note: The spelling used by Asser. Alternative spellings of Cynwit include Cynuit and Kynwit.) or Countisbury Hill took place between West Saxons and Vikings in 878. The location of the fortress the battle is named for is not known with certainty but probably was at Countisbury Hill or Wind Hill, near Countisbury, Devon. A possible alternative site for the siege and battle is Cannington Camp in the Parrett estuary near Combwich.

== Prelude ==
The Viking army was said to have been led by Ubba, (Note: The Anglo Saxon Chronicle does not name the leader of the Vikings but by tradition it is said to have been Ubba. Legend has it that Ubba's father was Ragnar Lodbrok. However, there is no references in the annals to support this assertion.) brother of Ivar the Boneless and Halfdan Ragnarsson, and sailed from Dyfed (where they had overwintered) to land on the coast at Countisbury (Note: A possible, alternative site for the siege and battle was at was Cannington Camp in the Parrett estuary near Combwich) with 23 ships and 1200 men. On landing, the Viking army discovered that the West Saxons had taken refuge in a stronghold at "Cynuit", possibly Countisbury. According to the 10th century chronicler Æthelweard, the West Saxons were led by Odda, the ealdorman of Devon. The Vikings perceived that the stronghold was unprepared for battle and decided to besiege it, as it did not seem to have any food or water supply.

== Battle ==
According to Alfred's biographer Asser, (Note: The historian, Barbara Yorke suggests that Asser's detailed account of the area may indicate that he visited the site of the siege.) the West Saxons burst out of the fortress one day at dawn and were able to overwhelm the Viking forces, killing their leader and over eight hundred of his men. They also captured the fabled "raven banner". The Anglo-Saxon Chronicle recorded:

And the same winter the brother of Hingwar and of Halfdene came with twenty-three ships to Devonshire in Wessex; and he was there slain, and with him eight hundred and forty men of his army: and there was taken the war-flag which they called the Raven.

— Giles 1914, ASC 878

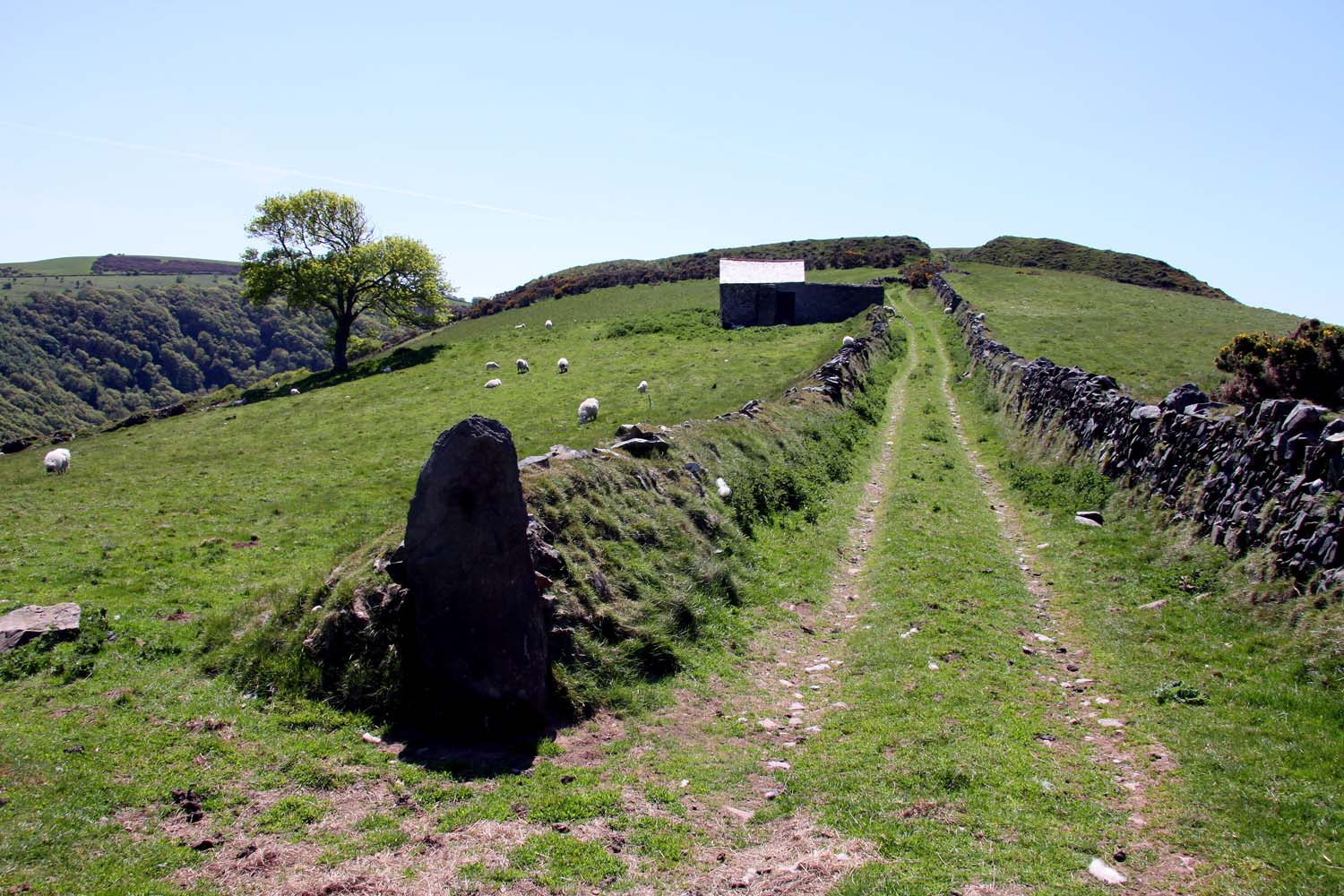
Track up Wind Hill (Countisbury Hill) probable site of the battle

Modern interpretation of the Raven banner.

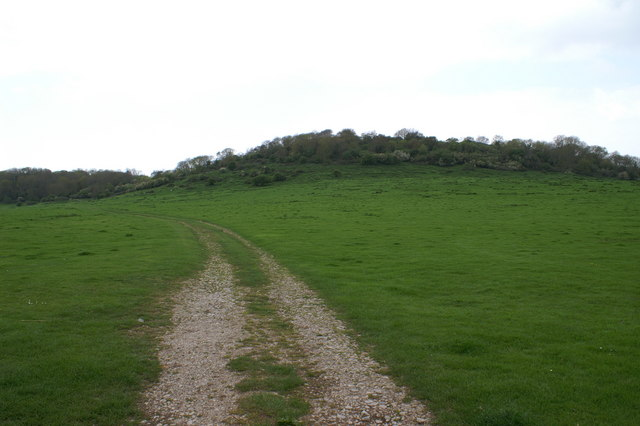
Cannington Camp a possible site of the battle.

== Aftermath ==
At the time of the battle, Alfred the Great of Wessex was on the run from the Vikings in the marshes of Somerset. It was therefore an important victory for the West Saxons won by someone other than Alfred, who was then leading English resistance to the Viking invasions. In addressing the year 878, the Anglo-Saxon Chronicle claimed that "all but Alfred the King" had been subdued by the Vikings' Great Heathen Army:

This year, during midwinter, after twelfth night, the army stole away to Chippenham, and overran the land of the West-Saxons, and sat down there; and many of the people they drove beyond sea, and of the remainder the greater part they subdued and forced to obey them, except king Alfred

— Giles 1914, ASC 878

The Battle of Cynwit was one of several triumphant stories recorded by Asser and the Chronicle in 878, ultimately culminating in the English victory over the Vikings at the Battle of Edington.
