= Cannington Camp =

Hillfort in Somerset, England

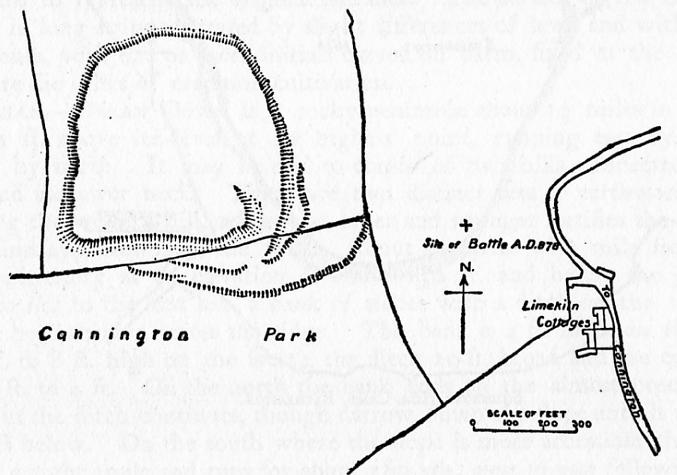
- Plan of earthworks at Cannington Camp

- Location within Somerset
- 51°09′33″N 3°04′51″W
- Location: Cannington, Somerset, England

History
- Built: Bronze Age and Iron Age

Scheduled monument
- Reference no.: 191244

Cannington Camp is a Bronze Age and Iron Age hill fort near Cannington, Somerset, England. It is a Scheduled Ancient Monument.

The small hill rises to 80 metres (260 ft) above low-lying land about 1.5 kilometres (0.93 mi) west of the tidal estuary of the River Parrett, near the ancient port and ford at Combwich. The hill fort is roughly square in shape, with a single rampart (univallate) enclosing 5 ha (12 acres), and the main entrance to the south-east. The north side of the hill has been destroyed by quarrying during the 19th and 20th centuries. Minor excavations were carried out in 1905, 1913 (Bezell), and 1963 (Rahtz).

Flint tools, scrapers and flakes have been found on or near the hill, indicating Mesolithic occupation. Bronze Age finds include an axe head and a knife. The area destroyed by quarrying was a late Roman and Saxon cemetery, with several hundred E-W (Christian) graves, and various grave goods such as coins and pottery from the period 350-800 AD.

It is possibly the site of Cynwit Castle (or Cynuit, Cynwith, Cynwits, etc.) and the Battle of Cynwit between Saxons and Vikings in 878 AD (see map). It may also be the location of an earlier battle in 845 AD, when the Saxons were led by Eanwulf and Ealstan, Bishop of Sherborne.

== Background ==
Hill forts developed in the Late Bronze and Early Iron Age, roughly the start of the first millennium BC. The reason for their emergence in Britain, and their purpose, has been a subject of debate. It has been argued that they could have been military sites constructed in response to invasion from continental Europe, sites built by invaders, or a military reaction to social tensions caused by an increasing population and consequent pressure on agriculture. The dominant view since the 1960s has been that the increasing use of iron led to social changes in Britain. Deposits of iron ore were located in different places from the tin and copper ore necessary to make bronze, and as a result trading patterns shifted and the old elites lost their economic and social status. Power passed into the hands of a new group of people. Archaeologist Barry Cunliffe believes that population increase still played a role and has stated "[the forts] provided defensive possibilities for the community at those times when the stress [of an increasing population] burst out into open warfare. But I wouldn't see them as having been built because there was a state of war. They would be functional as defensive strongholds when there were tensions and undoubtedly some of them were attacked and destroyed, but this was not the only, or even the most significant, factor in their construction".

== See also ==
- List of hill forts and ancient settlements in Somerset
- Battle of Cynwit
