= Ubba =

9th-century Viking leader of the Great Heathen Army

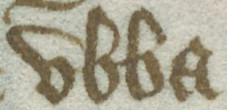
- Ubba's names
- Born: around 820–830
- Died: 878
- Military career
- Unit: Great Heathen Army
- Conflicts: Battle of York; Battle of Cynwit †

Ubba (Old Norse: Ubbi; died 878) was a 9th-century Viking and one of the commanders of the Great Heathen Army that invaded Anglo-Saxon England in the 860s. (Note: Since the 1990s, academics have accorded Ubba various personal names in English secondary sources: Huba, Hubba, Ubba, Ubbe Ragnarsson, Ubbe, Ubbi, Ubbo, and Ube.) The Great Army appears to have been a coalition of warbands drawn from Scandinavia, Ireland, the Irish Sea region and Continental Europe. There is reason to suspect that a proportion of the Viking forces specifically originated in Frisia, where some Viking commanders are known to have held fiefdoms on behalf of the Franks. Some sources describe Ubba as dux of the Frisians, which could be evidence that he also associated with a Frisian benefice.

In 865, the Great Army, apparently led by Ivar the Boneless, overwintered in the Kingdom of East Anglia, before invading and destroying the Kingdom of Northumbria. In 869, having been bought off by the Mercians, the Vikings conquered the East Angles, and in the process killed their king, Edmund, a man who was later regarded as a saint and martyr. While near-contemporary sources do not specifically associate Ubba with the latter campaign, some later, less reliable sources associate him with the legend of Edmund's martyrdom. In time, Ivar and Ubba came to be regarded as archetypal Viking invaders and opponents of Christianity. As such, Ubba features in several dubious hagiographical accounts of Anglo-Saxon saints and ecclesiastical sites. Non-contemporary sources also associate Ivar and Ubba with the legend of Ragnar Lodbrok, a figure of dubious historicity. Whilst there is reason to suspect that Edmund's cult was partly promoted to integrate Scandinavian settlers in Anglo-Saxon England, the legend of Ragnar Lodbrok may have originated in attempts to explain why they came to settle. Ubba is largely non-existent in the Icelandic traditions of Ragnar Lodbrok.

After the fall of the East Anglian kingdom, leadership of the Great Army appears to have fallen to Bagsecg and Halfdan, who campaigned against the Mercians and West Saxons. In 873, the Great Army is recorded to have split. Whilst Halfdan settled his followers in Northumbria, the army under Guthrum, Oscytel and Anwend struck out southwards and campaigned against the West Saxons. In the winter of 877–878, Guthrum launched a lightning attack deep into Wessex. There is reason to suspect that this strike was coordinated with the campaigning of a separate Viking force in Devon. This latter army is reported to have been destroyed at Arx Cynuit in 878. According to a near-contemporary source, this force was led by a brother of Ivar and Halfdan, and some later sources identify this man as Ubba himself.

== Origins of Ubba and the Great Army ==
In the mid-9th century, an invading Viking army coalesced in Anglo-Saxon England. The earliest version of the 9th- to 12th-century Anglo-Saxon Chronicle variously describes the invading host as "micel here", an Old English term that can translate as "big army" or "great army". Archaeological evidence and documentary sources suggest that this Great Army was not a single unified force, but more of a composite collection of warbands drawn from different regions.

The exact origins of the Great Army are obscure. The Anglo-Saxon Chronicle sometimes identifies the Vikings as Danes. The 10th-century Vita Alfredi seems to allege that the invaders came from Denmark. A Scandinavian origin may be evinced by the 10th-century Chronicon Æthelweardi, which states that "the fleets of the tyrant Ivar" arrived in Anglo-Saxon England from "the north". By the mid-9th century, this Ivar (died 870/873) was one of the foremost Viking leaders in Britain and Ireland.

The Great Army may have included Vikings already active in Anglo-Saxon England, as well as men directly from Scandinavia, Ireland, the Irish Sea region and the Continent. There is reason to suspect that a proportion of the army specifically originated in Frisia. For example, the 9th-century Annales Bertiniani reveals that Danish Vikings devastated Frisia in 850, and the 12th-century Annales Lindisfarnenses et Dunelmenses states that a Viking force of Danes and Frisians made landfall on the Isle of Sheppey in 855. The same source, and the 10th- or 11th-century Historia de sancto Cuthberto, describe Ubba as dux of the Frisians.

Whilst the Old English Anglo-Saxon Chronicle calls the Viking army micel here, the Latin Historia de sancto Cuthberto instead gives Scaldingi, a term of uncertain meaning that is employed three times in reference to the leadership of the Viking forces. One possibility is that the word means "people from the River Scheldt". This could indicate that Ubba was from Walcheren, an island in the mouth of the Scheldt. Walcheren is known to have been occupied by Danish Vikings over two decades before. For example, the Annales Bertiniani reports that Lothair I, King of Middle Francia (died 855) granted the island to a Viking named Herioldus in 841. Another possibility is that this term simply refers to Scyldings, an ancient lineage from which Danish monarchs of the time claimed descent.

According to the same source and the 9th-century Annales Fuldenses, another Viking named Roricus was granted a large part of Frisia as a benefice or fief from Lothair in 850. As men who held military and judicial authority on behalf of the Franks, Herioldus and Roricus can also be regarded as Frisian duces. Although it is uncertain whether Ubba was a native Frisian or a Scandinavian expatriate, if he was indeed involved with a Frisian benefice his forces would have probably been partly composed of Frisians. If his troops were drawn from the Scandinavian settlement started by Herioldus over two decades before, many of Ubba's men might well have been born in Frisia. In fact, the length of Scandinavian occupation suggests that some of the Vikings from Frisia would have been native Franks and Frisians. The considerable time that members of the Great Army appear to have spent in Ireland and on the Continent suggests that these men were well accustomed to Christian society, which in turn may partly explain their successes in Anglo-Saxon England.

== Viking invasion of Anglo-Saxon England ==
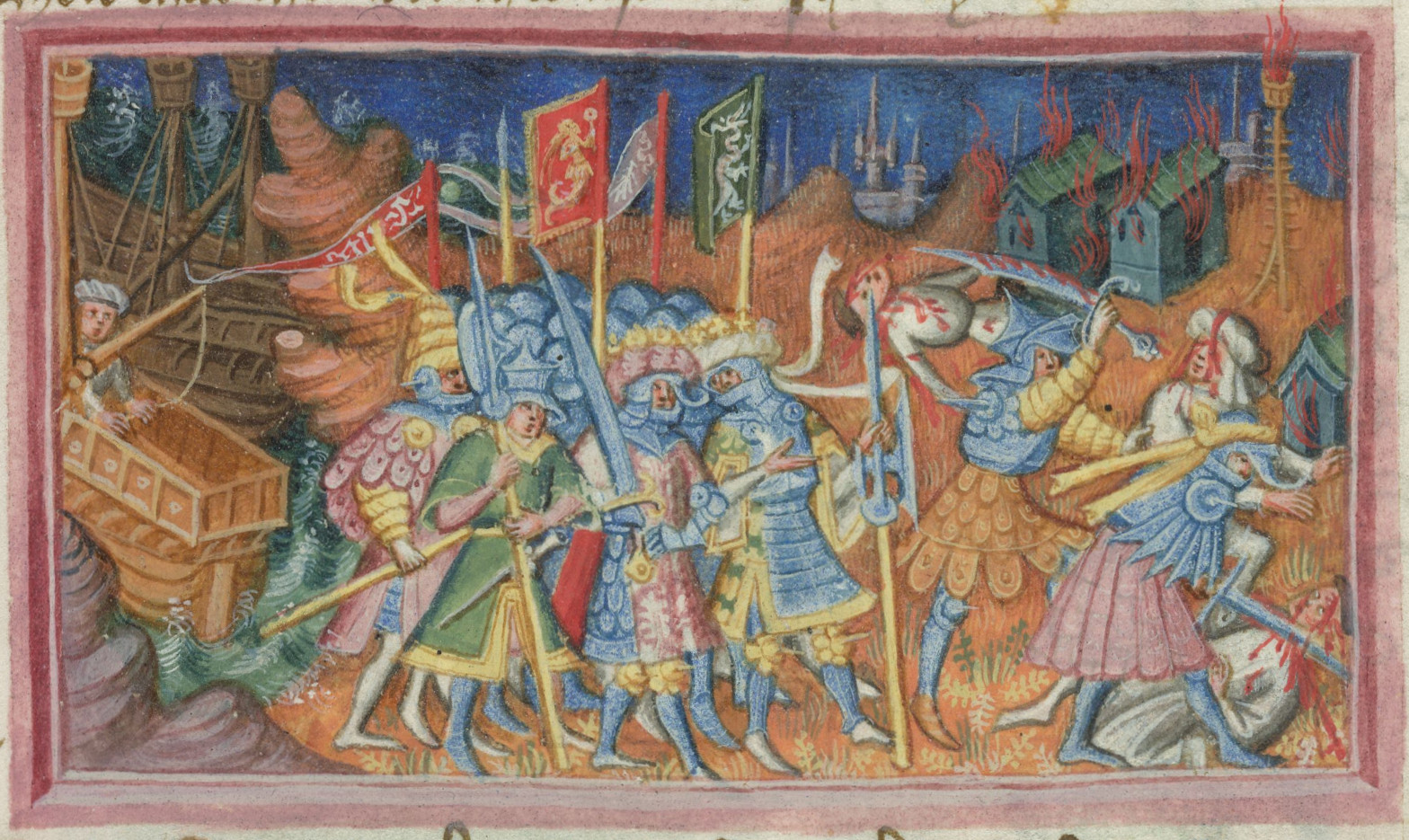
A 15th-century depiction of Ivar and Ubba ravaging the countryside as it appears on folio 48r of British Library Harley 2278. The Lives of Saints Edmund and Fremund presents 9th-century events in a chivalric context. (Note: The Lives of Saints Edmund and Fremund may be the high point of the late-medieval cult devoted to Edmund. The work draws from Passio sancti Eadmundi. The Lives of Saints Edmund and Fremund represents the first significant augmentation of Edmund's legend after Liber de infantia sancti Eadmundi.)

In the autumn of 865, the Anglo Saxon Chronicle records that the Great Army invaded the Kingdom of East Anglia, where they afterwards made peace with the East Anglians and overwintered. The terminology employed by this source suggests the Vikings attacked by sea. The invaders evidently gained valuable intelligence during the stay, as the Great Army is next stated to have left on horses gained from the subordinated population, striking deep into the Kingdom of Northumbria, a fractured realm in the midst of a bitter civil war between two competing kings: Ælla (died 867) and Osberht (died 867).

Late in 866 the Vikings seized York—one of only two archiepiscopal sees in Anglo-Saxon England, and one of the richest trading centres in Britain. Although Ælla and Osberht responded to this attack by joining forces against the Vikings, the chronicle indicates that their assault on York was a disaster that resulted in both their deaths. (Note: The Great Army's seizure of York is dated to 1 November (All Saints' Day) by the 12th-century Libellus de exordio, and the 13th-century Wendover version of Flores historiarum. Preying upon a populated site on a feast day was a noted tactic of the Vikings. Such celebrations offered attackers easy access to potential captives who could be ransomed or sold into slavery. According to Libellus de exordio, and the 12th-century Historia regum Anglorum, the Anglo-Saxons' attempt to recapture York took place on 21 March. The Wendover version of Flores historiarum, and Historia de sancto Cuthberto, date this attack to 23 March (Palm Sunday). Annales Lindisfarnenses et Dunelmenses states that Ubba crushed the Northumbrians "not long after Palm Sunday".) According to Annales Lindisfarnenses et Dunelmenses, and Historia de sancto Cuthberto, the Northumbrians and their kings were crushed by Ubba himself. (Note: At one point after its account of Ubba's stated victory over the Northumbrians, Historia de sancto Cuthberto expands upon the Vikings' successful campaigning across Anglo-Saxon England, and specifically identifies the Viking commanders as Ubba, dux of the Frisians, and Halfdan, rex of the Danes. Historia regum Anglorum identifies the commanders of the Vikings in 866 as Ivar, Ubba, and Halfdan. Libellus de exordio states that the Vikings who ravaged Northumbria were composed of Danes and Frisians.)

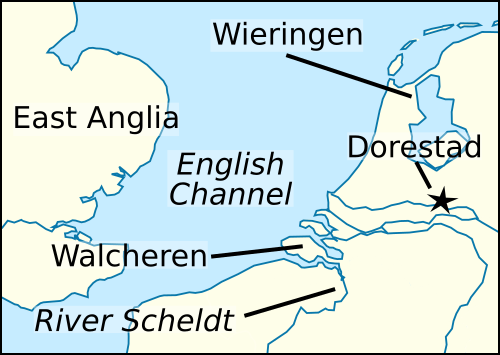
The 9th-century Frisian fiefdom of Roricus appears to have encompassed a region around Dorestad, Walcheren and Wieringen.

Also that year, Annales Bertiniani reports that Charles II, King of West Francia (died 877) paid off a Viking fleet stationed on the Seine. After proceeding down the Seine towards the sea, where they repaired and rebuilt their fleet, a portion of the force is reported to have left for the district of IJssel (either Hollandse IJssel or Gelderse IJssel). Although the destination of the rest of the fleet is unrecorded, one possibility is that it participated in the sack of York. The fact that the Great Army remained in East Anglia for about a year before it attacked Northumbria could mean that it had been reinforced from the Continent during the layover. The part of the fleet that went to Frisia is later stated to have been unable to secure an alliance with Lothair. This statement seems to suggest that these Vikings had intended to acquire a grant of lands in the region, which could mean that they thereafter took part in the Great Army's campaigning across the Channel. Furthermore, Annales Bertiniani notes that Roricus was forced from Frisia the following year. This ejection could also account for the evidence of a Frisian dimension to the Great Army, and for the attestations of Ubba himself.

With the collapse of the Northumbrian kingdom, and the destruction of its regime, the 12th-century Historia regum Anglorum, and Libellus de exordio, reveal that a certain Ecgberht (died 873) was installed by the Vikings as client king over a northern region of Northumbria. In the following year, the Anglo-Saxon Chronicle records that the Great Army attacked Mercia, after which the Vikings seized Nottingham and overwintered there. Although the Mercian and West Saxon kings, Burgred (died 874?) and Æthelred (died 871), responded by joining forces and besieging the occupied town, both the chronicle and Vita Alfredi report that this combined Anglo-Saxon force was unable to dislodge the army. According to both sources, the Mercians made peace with the Vikings. It was probably on account of this seemingly purchased peace that the Great Army relocated to York, as reported by the chronicle, where it evidently renewed its strength for future forays.

== Hagiographic association with Edmund ==
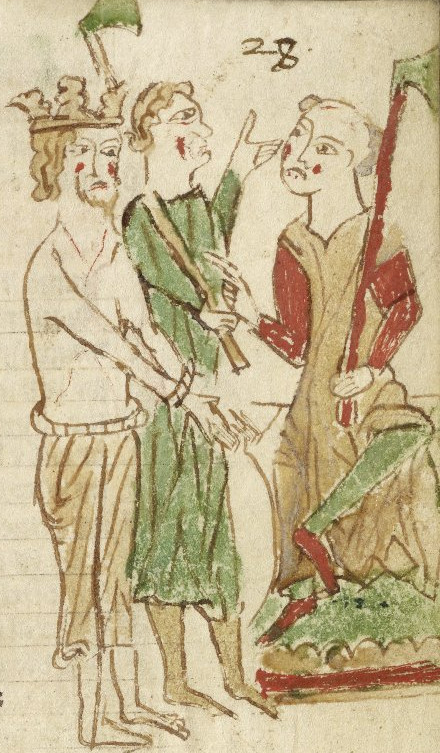
A 13th- or 14th-century depiction of Edmund, King of East Anglia, being brought bound before Ivar, as it appears on folio 28r of John Rylands Library French 142 (Note: This manuscript preserves a copy of the 12th-century La vie seint Edmund le rei.)

The earliest source to make specific note of Ubba is Passio sancti Eadmundi, which includes him in its account of the downfall of Edmund, King of East Anglia (died 869). Almost nothing is known of this king's career, and all that remain of his reign are a few coins. The first contemporary documentary source to cast any light upon his reign is the Anglo-Saxon Chronicle. According to this account, the Great Army invaded East Anglia in the autumn of 869, before setting up winter quarters at Thetford. The chronicle relates that the kingdom was conquered and Edmund was amongst the slain. (Note: During this period, the compilers of the Anglo-Saxon Chronicle began the year during the autumn, in September. As such, whilst most versions of the chronicle assign Edmund's demise to the year 870, it is evident that he actually died in the autumn of 869.)

Although the specific wording employed by most versions of the chronicle suggests that Edmund was killed in battle, and Vita Alfredi certainly states as much — with neither source making note of a martyrdom ordeal — later hagiographical accounts portray the king in an idealised light, and depict his death in the context of a peace-loving Christian monarch, who willingly suffered martyrdom after refusing to shed blood in defence of himself. (Note: In contrast to earlier versions of the Anglo-Saxon Chronicle, the 12th-century "E" and "F" versions make note of the king's sanctity. However, there is reason to suspect that these entries are influenced by hagiographical accounts of Edmund, and may stem from late textual additions to the chronicle. As such, these entries may not be evidence of the king's cult in the years immediately after his death.)

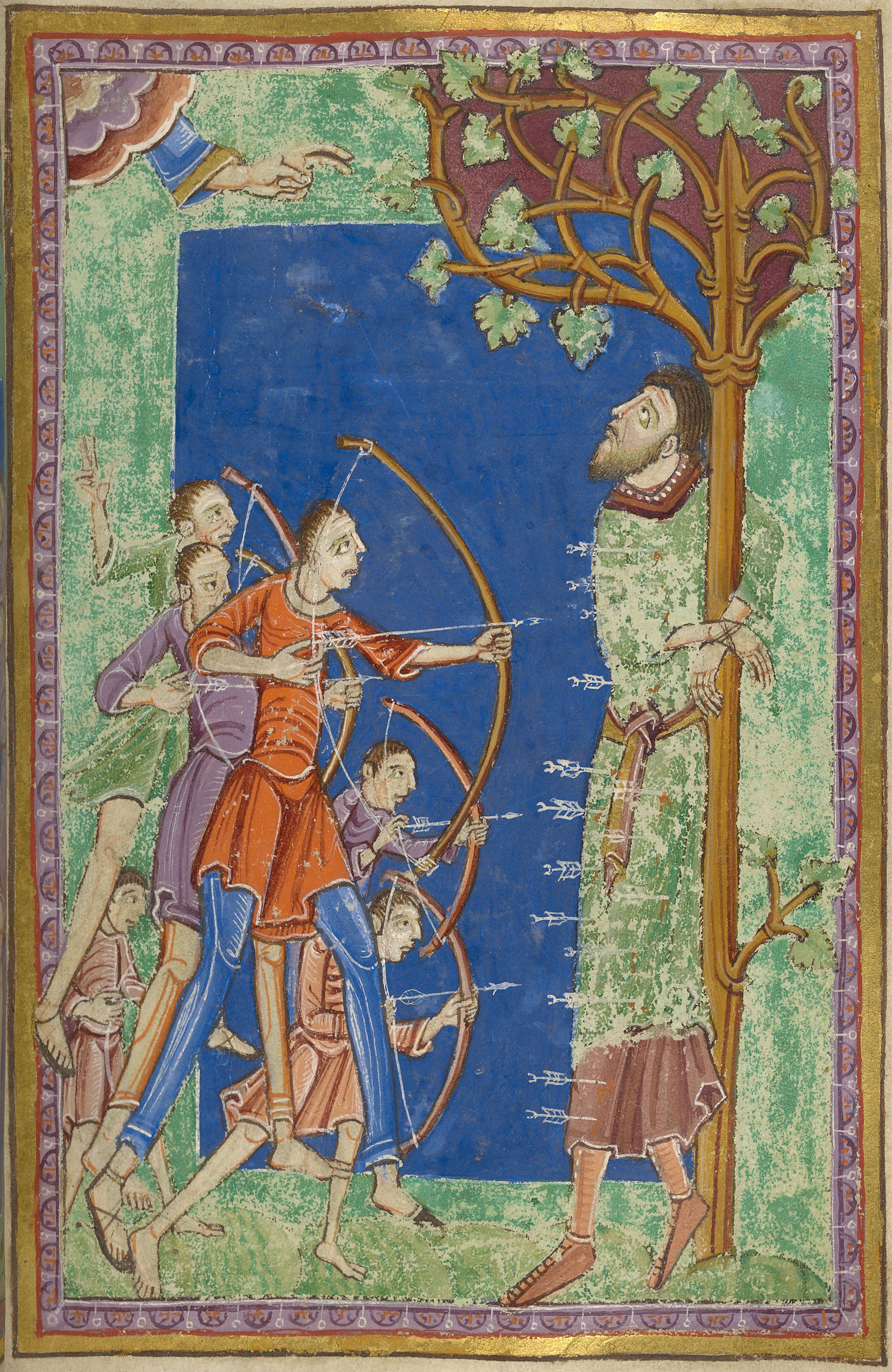
A 12th-century depiction of the killing of Edmund, King of East Anglia as depicted on folio 14r of Pierpont Morgan Library M.736 (Note: The account of Edmund's martyrdom preserved by Passio sancti Eadmundi likens him to Jesus Christ and St Sebastian. Specifically, Edmund is mocked and scourged like Christ, and later tied to a tree and shot like St Sebastian. Ubba and Ivar feature in the account of Edmund preserved by the 13th-century South English Legendary, a source steeped in anti-Danish sentiment. This source appears to depict the tortures inflicted upon Edmund as a way to define the English national identity in contrast to the barbarian Other.)

One such account is Passio sancti Eadmundi, a source that makes no mention of a battle. Whilst this source's claim that Edmund was martyred after being captured is not implausible, the fact that he came to regarded as a martyr does not negate the possibility that he was slain in battle (as suggested by the Anglo-Saxon Chronicle). (Note: For example, Oswald, King of Northumbria (died 642), was venerated as a martyr after he was slain battling seventh-century heathen. Óláfr Haraldsson, King of Norway (died 1030) was also slain in battle and later remembered as a martyr.) The apparent contradictory accounts of Edmund's demise given by these sources may stem from the telescoping of events surrounding an East Anglian military defeat and the subsequent capture and execution of the king. In any case, surviving numismatic evidence of coins bearing Edmund's name — the so-called St Edmund memorial coinage — reveals that he was certainly regarded as a saint by about twenty years after his death. (Note: The fact that Passio sancti Eadmundi was commissioned, and later spawned the account of Edmund presented by the 10th-century Lives of the Saints, reveals that the king's cult was recognised into the late 10th and 11th centuries. The composer of Passio sancti Eadmundi claimed that his version of events was mainly derived from a story he had heard told by the elderly Dunstan, Archbishop of Canterbury (died 988). The source relates that Dunstan heard this tale as a young man, from a very old man who claimed to have been Edmund's armour-bearer on the day of his death. Passio sancti Eadmundi and the Lives of the Saints specify that Edmund was killed on 20 November. This date was certainly commemorated by the 11th century.)

The reliability of Passio sancti Eadmundi is nevertheless uncertain. Although this source was composed over a century after the event, it may convey some credible material as the latest useful source. (Note: Passio sancti Eadmundi is the earliest hagiographical account of Edmund, and Vita Alfredi is the earliest biography of an Anglo-Saxon king.) Nevertheless, there is also reason to suspect that the account is little more than a collection of well-known hagiographical elements, and that the compiler knew little or nothing of Edmund's demise and early cult. The lurid depictions of Viking invaders presented by Passio sancti Eadmundi appear to owe much to the author's otherwise known association with Fleury, and specifically to the account of the Viking invasion of the Loire Valley detailed in Miracula sancti Benedicti, a 9th-century work composed by the Fleurian monk Adrevaldus (fl. 860s).

Boys, and men old and young, whom he encountered in the streets of the city were killed; and he paid no respect to the chastity of wife or maid. Husband and wife lay dead or dying together on their thresholds; the babe snatched from its mother's breast was, in order to multiply the cries of grief, slaughtered before her eyes. An impious soldiery scoured the town in fury, athirst for every crime by which pleasure could be given to the tyrant who from sheer love of cruelty had given orders for the massacre of the innocent.

— excerpt from Passio sancti Eadmundi depicting Ivar's invasion of East Anglia. (Note: This source portrays Ivar and Ubba as agents of the Devil, as does the derivative Lives of the Saints.)

In specific regard to Ubba, Passio sancti Eadmundi states that Ivar left him in Northumbria before launching his assault upon the East Angles in 869. (Note: This is the last time Passio sancti Eadmundi mentions Ubba. Whilst this source depicts the Vikings arriving in East Anglia by sea from Northumbria, the Anglo-Saxon Chronicle depicts them marching across Mercia into East Anglia.) If this source is to be believed, it could indicate that Ubba stayed behind to ensure the cooperation of the conquered Northumbrians. Although Vita Alfredi and the Anglo-Saxon Chronicle fail to note any Viking garrisons in the conquered Anglo-Saxon kingdoms, this may merely be a consequence of their otherwise perceptible West Saxon bias. (Note: There does not appear to be any hagiographical reason why the composer of Passio sancti Eadmundi would have constructed a narrative in which Ubba was left behind in Northumbria. Certainly, the 12th-century Estoire des Engleis, the earliest surviving Anglo-Norman history, notes that the Vikings left a garrison at York when they struck out for Nottingham in 867.) In contrast to Passio sancti Eadmundi, the 12th-century "F" version of the Anglo-Saxon Chronicle specifically identifies Ubba and Ivar as the chiefs of the men who killed the king. Whilst this identification could be derived from Passio sancti Eadmundi or the 10th-century Lives of the Saints, it could merely be a mistake on the chronicler's part. In any case, later and less reliable literature covering the martyrdom associates both men with the event, revealing that this version of events was current as early as the 12th century. (Note: One such source is Estoire des Engleis, which implies that Ubba and Ivar, described as kings, led the invasion of East Anglia, and further states that the captured Edmund was kept prisoner until their arrival. The fourteenth- to 15th-century Liber monasterii de Hyda also assigns the killing of Edmund to Ivar and Ubba.)

== Hagiographic association with Æbbe and Osyth ==
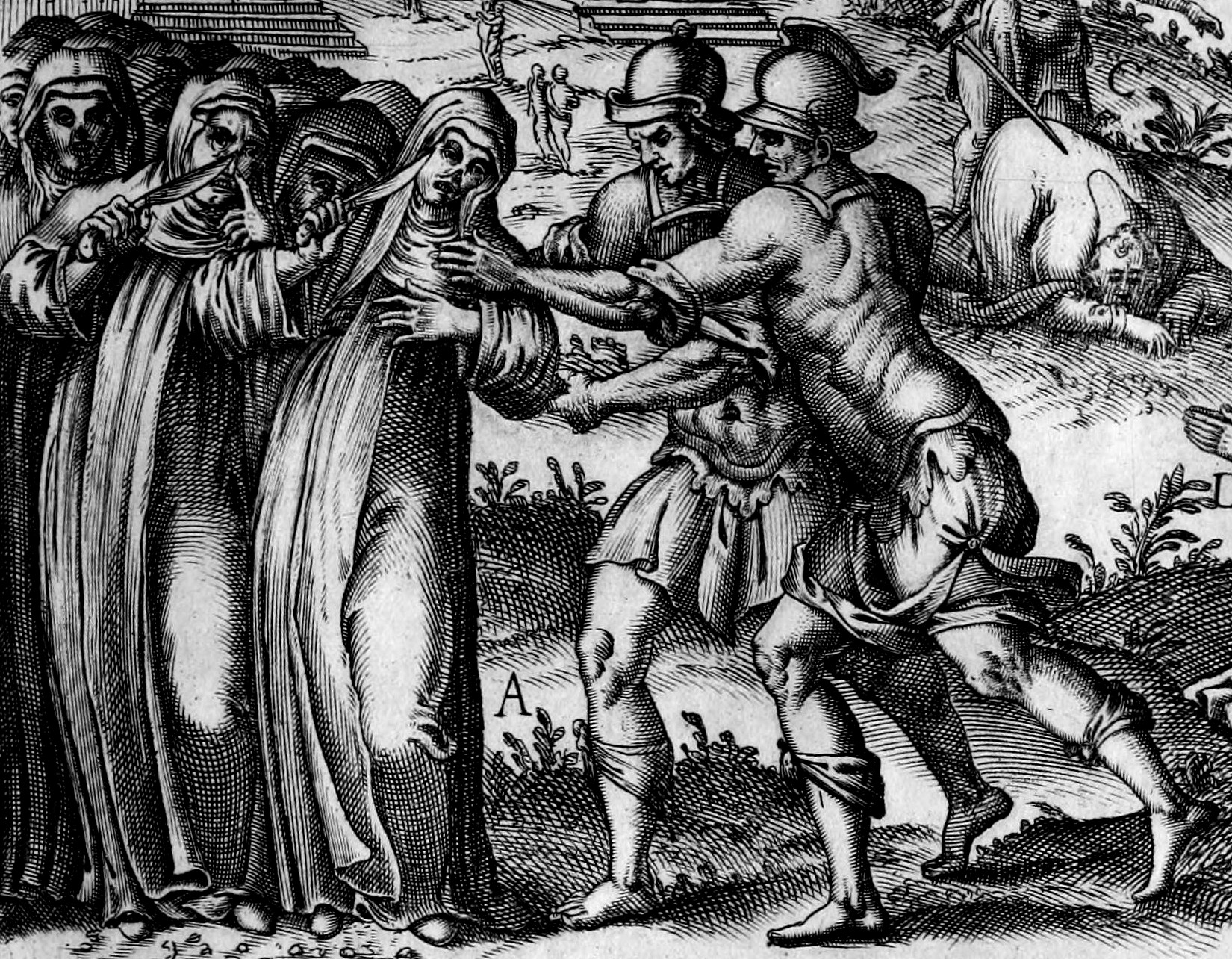
A 16th-century depiction of Æbbe and the nuns of Coldingham disfiguring themselves whilst pursued by Vikings

Ubba is associated with the martyrdom of Æbbe, an alleged abbess of Coldingham said to have been slain by Vikings in 870. The historicity of this woman is nevertheless uncertain. The earliest accounts of the alleged events at Coldingham date to the 13th century. They include Chronica majora, and both the Wendover and Paris versions of Flores historiarum. According to these sources, Æbbe compelled the nuns of Coldingham to disfigure themselves to preserve their virginity from an incoming horde of Vikings. Leading by example, Æbbe is said to have cut off her nose and upper lip with a razor. When the Viking arrived the following morning, the sight of the mutilated and bloody women repelled the raiders. Nevertheless, Ivar and Ubba are stated to have ordered the razing of the monastery, burning to death Æbbe and her faithful nuns.

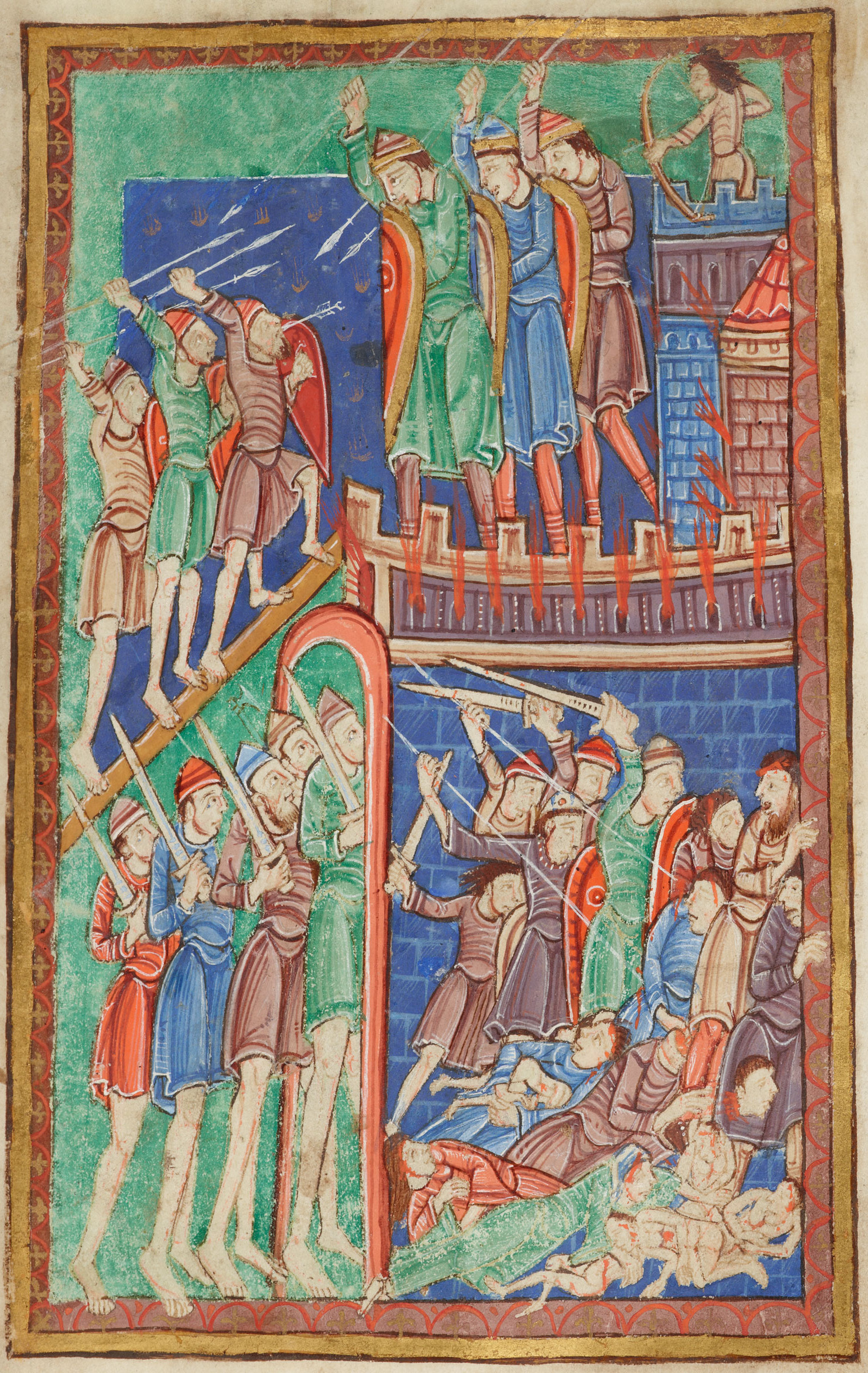
A 12th-century depiction of Vikings attacking a town, killing men, women and children, as depicted on folio 10r of Pierpont Morgan Library M.736 (Note: This miniature depicts several scenes. Whereas the first scene shows the Vikings battling against armed defenders of a burning town, the second shows mainly slaughtered unarmed inhabitants. Some of the latter are naked, which reflects the language employed by Passio sancti Eadmundi.)

Despite many lurid 12th-century tales of ecclesiastical devastation wrought by Vikings, the principal contemporary source for this period, the 9th- or 10th-century "A" version of the Anglo-Saxon Chronicle, fails to note the destruction of a single Anglo-Saxon church by Scandinavians during the 8th and 9th centuries. Although Passio sancti Eadmundi presents the invasion of East Anglia by Ubba and Ivar as a campaign of wanton rape and murder, the account does not depict the destruction of the kingdom's monasteries. In fact, there is reason to suspect that most Anglo-Saxon monastic sites probably survived the Viking invasions of the era, and that the East Anglian Church withstood the Viking invasions and occupation. (Note: Supposed ecclesiastic devastation wrought by the Vikings has not been established by archaeology. The only ecclesiastical site proven to have suffered a detrimental effect from the Vikings is St Wystan's Church at Repton, where the Vikings are otherwise known to have overwintered in 873/874.)

Whilst Viking depredations of monasteries tend not to feature in sources intended for royal audiences, religious desecrations appear in sources composed for ecclesiastical audiences. There are several reasons why 12th-century sources associate the Vikings with seemingly unhistorical atrocities against particular monasteries. For example, such depredations could explain changes in monastic observance, or the switch from monastic- to clerical observance. Stories of Viking attacks could be used as evidence of the former possession of property claimed by religious houses centuries after the fact. The 9th-century Viking onslaught may have also been a way in which 12th-century commentators sought to explain what was regarded as monastic decay in 10th-century Anglo-Saxon England. This imagined or exaggerated religious extirpation could well have been a convenient way of accounting for the scarcity of documentary evidence concerning early religious institutions. Twelfth-century ecclesiastical historians availed themselves of sources such as the Anglo-Saxon Chronicle and Passio sancti Eadmundi. The fact that the latter was particularly influential to mediaeval historians is evidenced by the frequent occurrences of Ivar and Ubba in reports of religious atrocities. To medieval hagiographers and historians, these two figures were archetypal Viking invaders and emblematic opponents of Christianity. (Note: In comparison to hagiographies like Passio sancti Eadmundi and Lives of Saints, the Anglo-Saxon Chronicle gives a much less dramatic and detailed depiction of the 9th century. As a result, the authors of later mediaeval histories relied upon these hagiographies for their narratives. Even today, Lives of Saints is one of the most-read Old English texts, and historians' views of the past are still shaped by it. The reputation of Ivar and Ubba may lay behind the similarly named Yvor and Yni, noted by the 12th-century Historia regum Britanniæ. According to this source, Yvor and Yni were closely related Britons who failed to eject the Anglo-Saxons from Britain after launching a series of maritime invasions of the island. As a result of their failure, Historia regum Britanniæ declares that the British people thereafter became known as the Welsh. Whilst Yvor seems to correspond to the Old Norse Ívarr, the form Yni may be a garbled attempt at Ubba's name. The 12th-century "E" version of Anglo-Saxon Chronicle claims that Ivar and Ubba destroyed all monasteries they encountered, and specifies that they burned the monastery of Medeshamstede (Peterborough), and killed its abbot and monks. The 12th-century chronicle of Hugh Candidus (died c.1160) also relates that Ivar and Ubba were responsible for the annihilation of churches throughout Anglo-Saxon England, and specifies that they destroyed the monastery and monks of Medeshamstede. According to this source, which is heavily influenced by Passio sancti Eadmundi, some of the monasteries ravaged by Ivar and Ubba remained deserted and in ruins until his own time.)

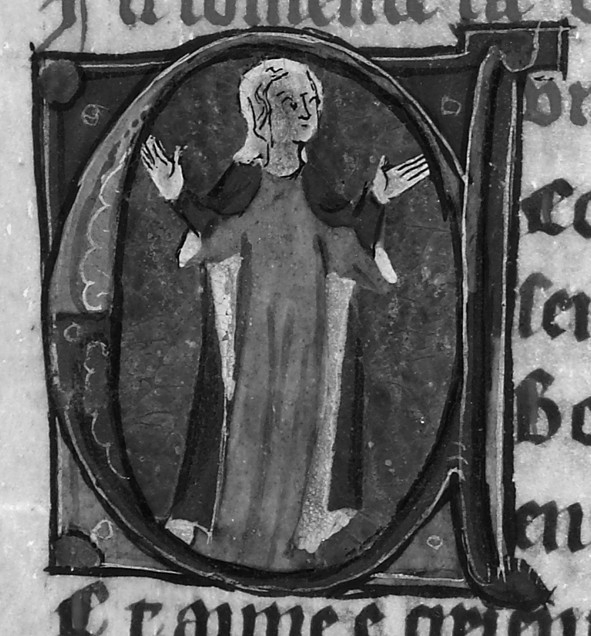
A 13th- or 14th-century depiction of Osyth as it appears on folio 134v of British Library Additional 70513

The accounts of Æbbe could be an example of such a constructed tale. The story appears be ultimately derived from the account of Coldingham preserved by the eighth-century Historia ecclesiastica. According to this source, Æthelthryth (died 679), wife of Ecgfrith, King of Northumbria (died 685), entered the monastery under the tutelage of an abbess named Æbbe (died 683?). At some point after Æthelthryth left Coldingham to found a monastery at Ely, Historia ecclesiastica reports that the monastery of Coldingham burned to the ground. This account of Coldingham's burning was later incorporated into Liber Eliensis, a 12th-century chronicle covering the history of Æthelthryth's establishment at Ely. The account of the burning given by Historia ecclesiastica may well be the inspiration behind the tale of facial mutilation and fiery martyrdom first associated with Coldingham by the Wendover version of Flores historiarum. (Note: The story of nuns self-mutilating to avoid rape at the hands of roving Vikings is not confined to Coldingham, it is also attributed to the 9th-century nuns of Fécamp across the Channel in Normandy.) To 12th-century ecclesiasts, invented tales of 9th-century violence—particularly violence inflicted by Ivar and Ubba—may have been intended to validate the refoundation of certain religious communities. (Note: For example, the 13th-century Whitby cartulary preserves a 12th-century account of how the knight Reinfrid came to "Streoneshalc", a place that had been "laid to waste, in a ferocious devastation", by Ivar and Ubba, "the most cruel pirates". As a result of this carnage, the accounts relates that the religious services of monks and nuns had ceased for over two centuries, and that Reinfrid was struck with compunction having observed the desolation for himself. Another example is given by the 12th-century Chronicon ex chronicis which states that the invasions of Ivar and Ubba were responsible for the flight of the Cuthbertine community of Lindisfarne. Ivar and Ubba are also woven into the account of the monastery of Ely preserved by Liber Eliensis. If this source is to be believed, the Vikings' destruction of this religious house—in a blazing fire that consumed all of its nuns—were the reason why this formerly flourishing ecclesiastical site became a secular community by the end of the 10th century. According to this account, the monastery's annihilation occurred in the context of Ivar and Ubba's campaigning at the time of Edmund's downfall. Whilst this tale of fiery destruction appears to be derived from the 12th-century Libellus Æthelwoldi, the portrayal of marauding Vikings is borrowed from sources such as Chronicon ex chronicis and Passio sancti Eadmundi. The latter account also seems to be the source for the appearance of Ivar and Ubba in the account of the hermit Suneman, and the destruction of St Benet's Abbey, given by the 14th-century Chronicon Joannis Bromton. According to the 13th-century Chronica Johannis de Oxenedes, Suneman was martyred by invading Vikings.)

The earliest Anglo-Saxon virgin-martyr is Osyth. A now-lost 12th-century vita of this woman associated Ivar and Ubba with her seventh-century martyrdom. According to this source, Ivar and Ubba commanded the pirates who beheaded her after she refused to worship their pagan idols. This work may have been the inspiration behind the Anglo-Norman hagiography Vie seinte Osith, a composition that also attributes Osyth's killing to Ivar and Ubba and their followers. (Note: This source also associates Ivar and Ubba with Edmund's martyrdom. The lost vita can be reconstructed from notes dating to the sixteenth century. Ivar and Ubba play a role in an hagiographical account of Hild, a seventh-century Anglo-Saxon saint. According to an hagiographical poem preserved by the 15th-century manuscript Cambridge Trinity College 0.9.38 (T), the campaigning of Ivar and Ubba forced a certain Titus to remove Hild's relics to Glastonbury Abbey, where he became abbot. This account appears to conflate two incompatible accounts presented by the author of the 12th-century texts Gesta pontificum Anglorum and De antiquitate Glastonie ecclesie. Whilst the former composition states that the relics were donated to Glastonbury by Edmund himself, the latter relates that the relics were brought to Glastonbury in the eighth century by Tica, a man who became Abbot of Glastonbury. Tica appears to be identical to Tyccea, an historical eighth-century ecclesiast attested in the western Anglo-Saxon England. The rampaging of Ivar and Ubba is also noted by De sancto Oswino, an account of Oswine, King of Deira (died 651) that forms part of the 14th-century Sanctilogium Angliae, Walliae, Scotiae, et Hiberniae. This hagiography of Oswine appears to derive its account from Vita tertia sancti Oswini. Although the latter text fails to include Ivar and Ubba in its version of events, the manuscript of this source—British Library Cotton Julius A.x.—contains a lacuna between folios 9 and 10 where at least one leaf has been lost. There is reason to suspect that the missing content has been preserved by Chronica majora and the Wendover and Paris versions of Flores historiarum—sources which state that Ivar and Ubba destroyed the monastery of Tynemouth, and thereby massacred the nuns of Hild's convent who cared for Oswine's shrine. An hagiographical account of Oswine could be the source behind the account of the monastery's burning given by the sixteenth-century Collectanea of John Leland (died 1552). Although this source attributes the monastic destruction to Ivar and Ubba, the fate of the nuns is not mentioned. Ivar and Ubba also feature in the legend of the martyrdom of Fremund, a 9th-century saint whose historicity is also uncertain. Accounts of Fremund are not found in any Anglo-Saxon historical sources, and are preserved in later hagiographical compositions. The earliest source of the legend is a 13th-century manuscript Dublin Trinity College 172 (B 2 7), The best-known version of the legend is given by the 15th-century Lives of Saints Edmund and Fremund. All versions of Fremund's vitae tell a similar tale. According to these sources, Ivar and Ubba invaded Anglo-Saxon England and slew Edmund, after which Fremund orchestrated a miraculous avenging victory over the Vikings, and was treacherously slain afterwards. Ivar and Ubba also play a part in the legend of Sexburga (died 674?). Specifically, according to the 12th-century Vita beate Sexburge regine, this seventh-century East Anglian saint had a premonition of future calamities that were proved true through the invasion of Ivar and Ubba.)

== The Great Army after Ivar ==
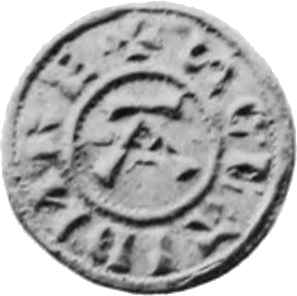
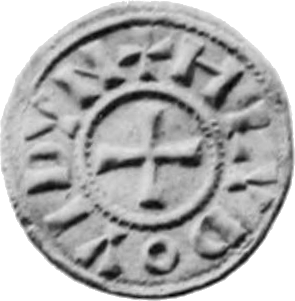
The obverse and reverse of an Edmund memorial coin. Although some of the moneyers' names that appear on these coins are Anglo-Saxon, many more are foreign. The names suggest that there was a significant influx of Continental emigration into Anglo-Scandinavian-controlled regions. (Note: The moneyer of this particular coin was a man named Hlodovicus–whose name is inscribed on the reverse–which could be evidence that he was a Frank. The coins that bear Edmund's name, the so-called St Edmund memorial coinage, are the earliest evidence of a religious cult devoted to the king. There is reason to suspect that the cult was advanced by later Anglo-Scandinavians as a way to retain authority in East Anglia, as a way to repent for his death at the hands of their Viking predecessors. It is also possible that the cult was originally promoted as a way the surviving East Anglian aristocracy attempted to oppose Anglo-Scandinavian overlordship, and that the Anglo-Scandinavian regime thereafter adopted the cult and capitalised upon it. Conversely, it is possible that the cult was originally more focused upon Edmund's royal standing than his death, and only acquired anti-Anglo-Scandinavian connotations in a later period. In any case, the memorial coinage seems to have been minted under the auspices of the Anglo-Scandinavian leadership, and his cult certainly spread into the Scandinavia later in the Middle Ages.)

The history of East Anglia immediately after Edmund's demise is extremely obscure. The account of events presented by Passio sancti Eadmundi seems to show that Edmund was killed in the context of the Great Army attempting to impose authority over him and his realm. Such an accommodation appears to have been gained by the Vikings in Northumbria and Mercia. In any case, numismatic evidence appears to indicate that two client kings—a certain Æthelred and Oswald—thereafter ruled over the East Angles on behalf of the Viking conquerors.

It is at about this point that Ivar disappears from English history. According to Chronicon Æthelweardi, he died in the same year as Edmund. However, this record may partly stem from the fact that he did not take part in the subsequent war against the Kingdom of Wessex, beginning in the autumn or winter of 870. (Note: Whilst there is reason to suspect that Ivar is identical to Ímar (died 873), a Viking king later active in Ireland and northern Britain, such an identification is uncertain. Nevertheless, if Ivar is indeed identical to Ímar—and therefore commanded Vikings settled in the Irish Sea region before the coalescence of the Great Army in Anglo-Saxon England—it is possible that he and Halfdan led the troops identified as Danes and that Ubba led those identified as Frisians. It is also possible that Ubba is identical to Rodulfus (died 878), a Viking attested on the Continent in the 860s and 870s. Rodulfus is recorded to have been slain in an attack on Oostergo in 873.) In any case, the leadership of the Great Army appears to have fallen to kings Bagsecg (died 871) and Halfdan (died 877), the first principal Viking leaders attested by all versions of the Anglo-Saxon Chronicle after the army's recorded arrival. (Note: Many of the earliest Vikings attested by the Anglo-Saxon Chronicle are those that lost recorded battles or died in them. Such is certainly the case in Irish sources. The fifteenth- to sixteenth-century Annals of Ulster, for example, reports the deaths of Saxólfr (died 837), Þórgísl (died 845), Hákon (died 847), and Þórir (died 848) in the 830s and 840s, before naming the first living Viking, Steinn (fl. 852), in the 850s.)

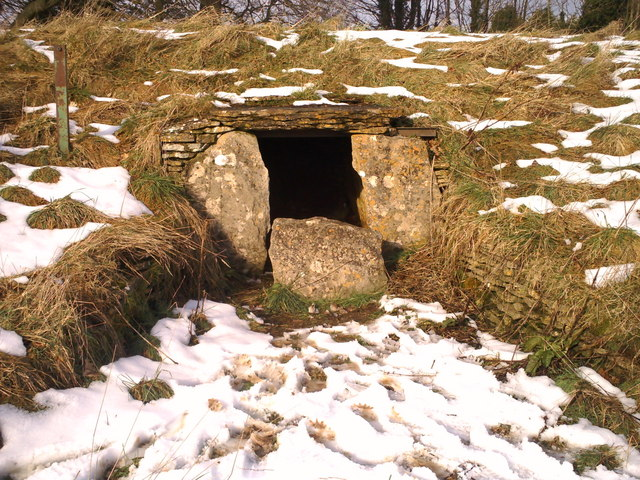
The prehistoric barrow at Lanhill, near Chippenham and Avebury, probably dates to about the third millennium BC. Nevertheless, it was associated with Ubba in the 17th century. (Note: Specifically, John Aubrey (died 1697) called it "Hubbaslow" and "Hubba's Low", and stated that it was the site "where they say that one Hubba lies buried".)

For about a year, the Great Army campaigned against the West Saxons, before overwintering in London. Late in 872, after spending nearly a year in London, the Vikings were drawn back to Northumbria, and afterwards to Mercia. By the end of 874, the kingdoms of East Anglia, Mercia and Northumbria were finally broken. At this point, the Great Army split. Whilst Halfdan settled his followers in Northumbria, the army under Guthrum (died 890), Oscytel (fl. 875) and Anwend (fl. 875), struck out southwards, and based itself at Cambridge. In 875, the Vikings invaded Wessex and seized Wareham. Although Alfred, King of Wessex (died 899) sued for peace in 876, the Vikings broke the truce the following year, seized Exeter, and were finally forced to withdraw back to Mercia.

Although much of Guthrum's army started to settle in Mercia, (Note: This region of settlement came to be known as Five Boroughs: Derby, Leicester, Lincoln, Nottingham, and Stamford.) the Anglo-Saxon Chronicle and Vita Alfredi reveal that Guthrum launched a surprise attack against the West Saxons in the winter of 877/878. Setting off from their base in Gloucester, the latter source specifies that the Vikings drove deep into Wessex, and sacked the royal vill of Chippenham. (Note: A vill was an administration unit, roughly equating to a modern parish. Chippenham appears to have been a significant settlement during the period, and might well have been a seat of the West Saxon monarchy.) It is possible that this operation was coordinated with another Viking attack in Devon that culminated in the Battle of Arx Cynuit in 878.

== Battle of Arx Cynuit ==
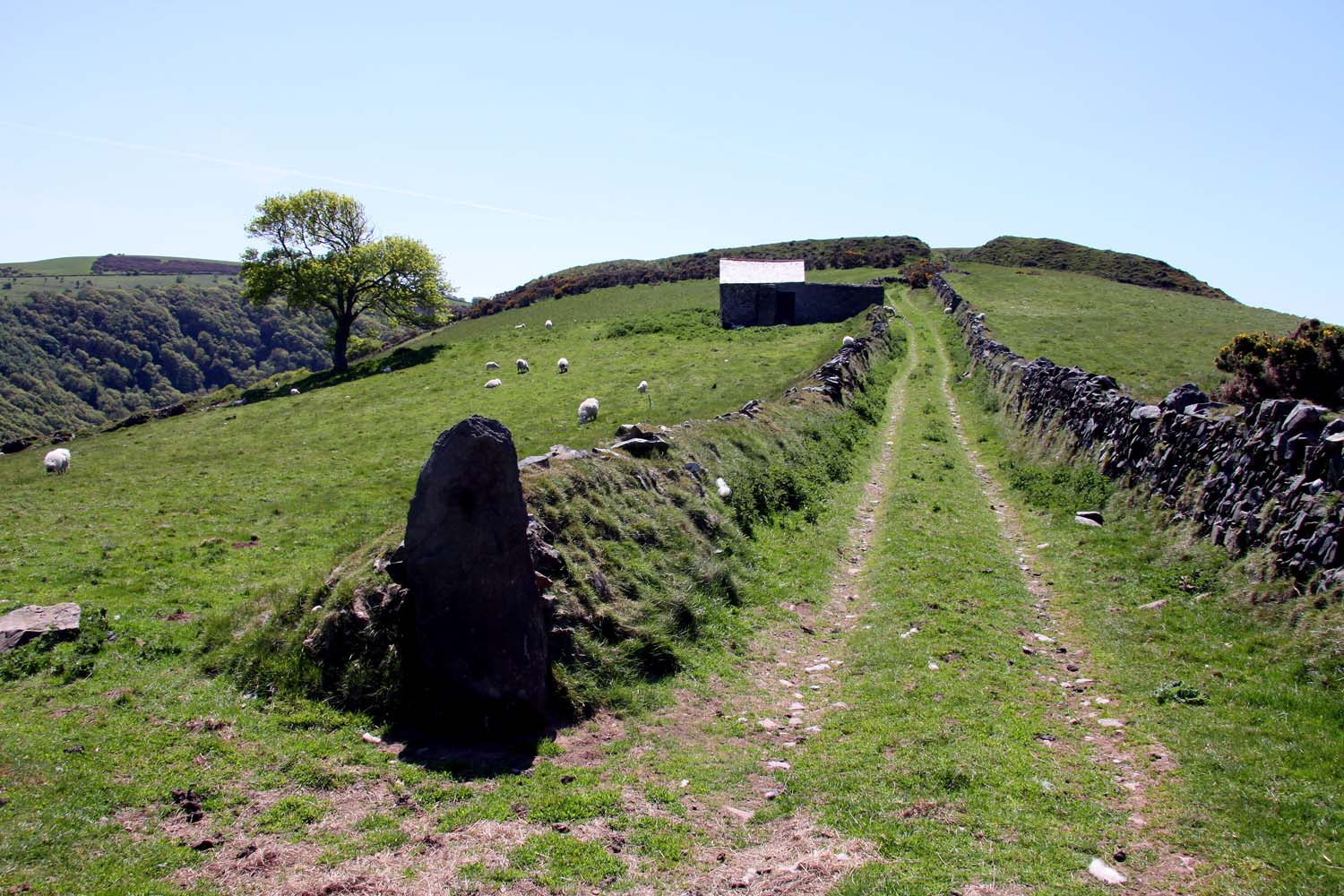
Wind Hill, near Countisbury, Devon, possibly the site of the Viking defeat at the hands of local men in 878. Some mediaeval sources claim that Ubba led the vanquished army, and that he was among those slain.

Most versions of the Anglo-Saxon Chronicle locate the battle to Devon. (Note: The "B" and "C" versions of this source do not locate the conflict to any specific place.) Vita Alfredi specifies that it was fought at a fortress called Arx Cynuit, a name which appears to equate to what is today Countisbury, in North Devon. (Note: Other locations have been suggested. One such place is Old Burrow (grid reference SS 7874 4928), the site of a nearby Roman fortlet. Another possible location is Castle Hill, near Beaford and Great Torrington. Another is Kenwith Castle, and another is Congresbury. The seventeenth-century Devonian topographer Thomas Westcote (fl. 1624–1636) remarked that "as many places in this county claim the honour of this victory, as cities in Greece for the birth of Homer". Westcote himself located the battle to place near Appledore, where he claimed that a cairn called "Whibbestow" sat on the site before it was lost to the encroaching sea. A close contemporary of Westcote, Tristram Risdon (died 1640), also located the site near Appledore, stating that the Danes buried Ubba on the shore in a mound called "Hubba stone". According to Risdon, although the mound of stones had washed away by the time of his writing, a form of the site's name existed near Appledore as "Wibblestone" in the parish of Northam. By the eighteenth century, it was claimed that Ubba's burial was located near Bideford, and was called "Hubblestone" and "Hubble's Stone" because of a large stone that marked the grave. The site came to be called "Whibblestone" by the nineteenth century.) This source also states that the Vikings made landfall in Devon from a base in Dyfed, where they had previously overwintered. As such, the Viking army could have arrived in Dyfed from Ireland, and overwintered in Wales before striking forth into Devon. (Note: Nevertheless, the attack on Dyfed, and the actual siege of Arx Cynuit, is not noted by the Anglo-Saxon Chronicle.)

The Anglo-Saxon Chronicle does not identify the army's commander by name. It merely describes him as a brother of Ivar and Halfdan, and observes that he was slain in the encounter. (Note: Vita Alfredi similarly identifies the slain commander as a brother of Ivar and Halfdan.) Although Ubba is identified as the slain commander by the 12th-century Estoire des Engleis, it is unknown whether this identification is merely an inference by its author, or if it is derived from an earlier source. (Note: Estoire des Engleis is otherwise known to have been partly derived from a now-non-existent early version of the Anglo-Saxon Chronicle. The source nevertheless attributes the victory to Alfred himself.) For example, this identification could have been influenced by the earlier association of Ubba and Ivar in the legends surrounding Edmund's martyrdom. In any case, Estoire des Engleis further specifies that Ubba was slain at "bois de Pene"—which may refer to Penselwood, near the Somerset–Wiltshire border—and buried in Devon within a mound called "Ubbelawe". (Note: Estoire des Engleis is the only source to assign the burial site to Ubba. The 13th-century Ragnars saga loðbrókar states that Ivar was also buried in a mound. According to this source, Harald Hardrada (died 1066) was defeated by the English near the mound, and when William II, Duke of Normandy (died 1087) arrived on the scene he had the mound destroyed and thereby conquered the English. A somewhat similar tale concerning Ivar's mound is given by the 13th-century Hemings þáttr. The tale of Ivar's burial is paralleled by one given by Historia regum Britanniæ—which in turn seems to be derived from a tale presented by Historia Brittonum—that recounts how the Briton Vortimer, son of Vortigern, asked to be buried in a mound along the British coast to deter the Saxon invasions. According to the Distich on the Sons of Lothebrok, a series of notes preserved by the twelfth- to 13th-century Cambridge Pembroke College 82, Ubba was slain at Ubbelaw in Yorkshire. This source further relates that Björn (Beorn), a brother of Ubba, destroyed a church at Sheppey, violated the nuns, and was miraculously killed in an act of divine retribution, as he was swallowed alive by the ground at Frindsbury, near Rochester. A similar story is given by the 13th-century British Library Arundel 69. According to Liber monasterii de Hyda, Ubba met his end the same way. One possibility is that this version of events is connected to the tale of the burial mound given by Estoire des Engleis. Whilst Ubba is specifically associated with Frisia and Frisans by sources such as Annales Lindisfarnenses et Dunelmenses and Historia de sancto Cuthberto, Björn is specifically associated with Frisia by the 11th-century Gesta Normannorum ducum, which remarks that he (Bier Costae ferreae) went there and died. The later Chronicon Joannis Bromton gives a confused account of Ubba, Ivar, and Björn (Bruern Bocard). This source seems to associate the demise of these men with the Anglo-Saxon victory at the Battle of Chippenham, but states that the surviving Danes came across Ubba's body amongst the slain, and buried him in a mound called "Hubbelow" in Devon. A similar account associating Ubba with the same battle, and a burial mound named after him, is given by the 14th-century Eulogium historiarum sive temporis. Another unreliable depiction of Ubba's demise is given by Liber Eliensis, which states that he was one of the slain Viking leaders at the Battle of Ashdown.)

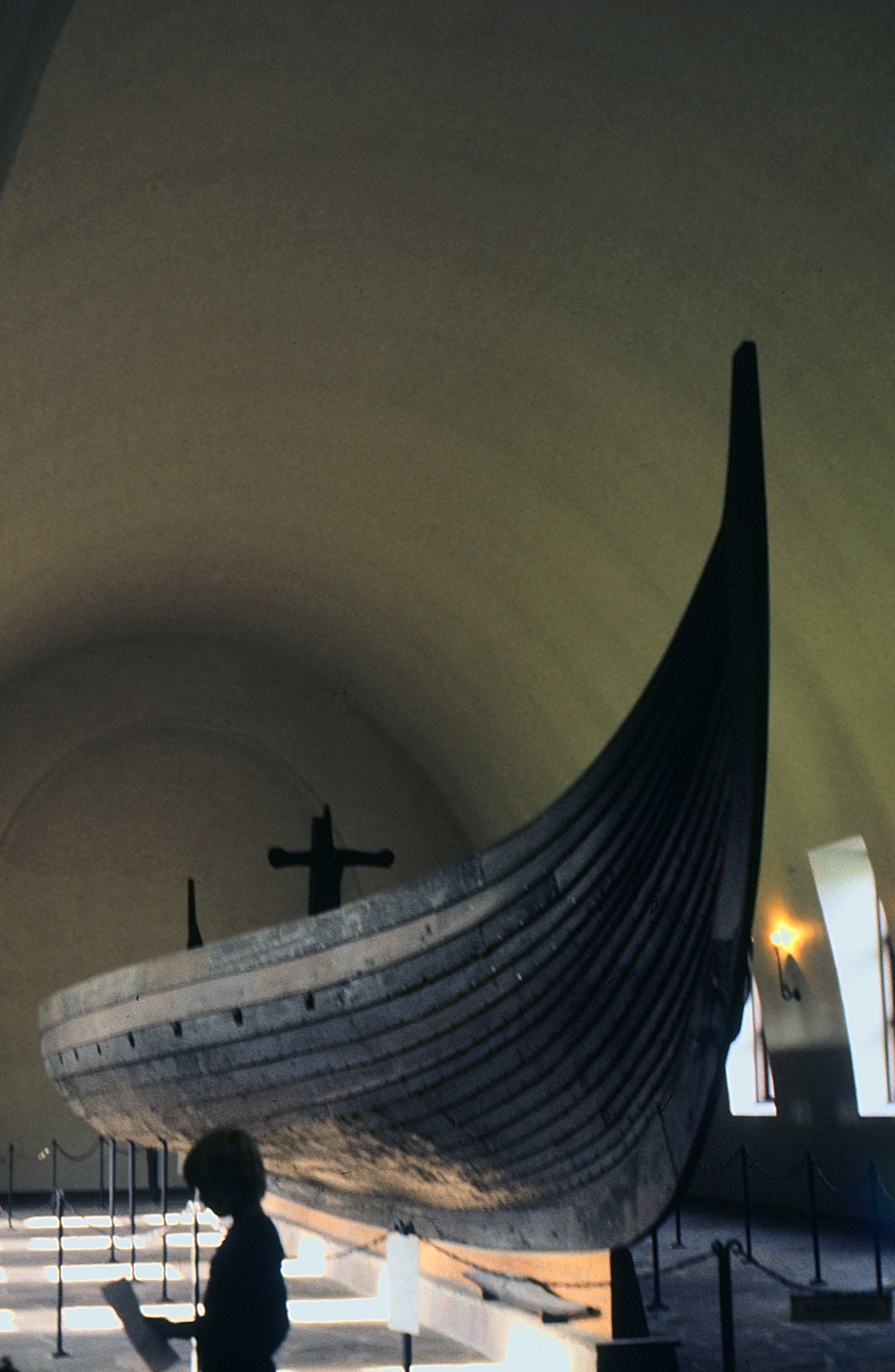
The remains of the Gokstad ship, a 9th-century Viking ship unearthed in Norway

The clash at Arx Cynuit culminated in a West Saxon victory. Whilst Vita Alfredi attributes the outcome to unnamed thegns of Alfred, Chronicon Æthelweardi identifies the victorious commander as Odda, Ealdorman of Devon (fl. 878). Most versions of the Anglo-Saxon Chronicle number the Viking fleet at twenty-three ships, and most versions number the Viking casualties at eight hundred and forty dead. (Note: The "D" and "E" versions of the Anglo-Saxon Chronicle do not number the ships. The "B" and "C" versions state that the Vikings suffered eight hundred and sixty dead. The discrepancy can be accounted for by the similarity to the tallies when presented in roman numerals: ".dccc. + .xl." (840) compared to ".dccc. + .lx." (860). All versions of the Anglo-Saxon Chronicle number the Viking casualties in a complex manner, stating that eight hundred "men with him" and a further forty (or sixty) "men of his army" were killed. The Old English heres, generally taken to mean "army" in this passage, may be an error for hīredes, a term for a personal retinue. As such numbers forty and sixty in these sources may well refer to Ubba's personal retinue. The Anglo-Saxon Chronicle does not employ the term micel ("great") in its depiction of the army. Vita Alfredi numbers the Viking dead at one thousand two hundred. Chronicon Æthelweardi numbers the dead at eight hundred, and the fleet at thirty ships. This source specifically identifies the slain Viking commander as Halfdan, describing him as the brother of Ivar, and unlike other accounts, states that the Vikings were victorious in the affair. The 12th-century Historia Anglorum, partly derived from the Anglo-Saxon Chronicle, does not name the Viking commander, but describes him as a brother of Halfdan. Historia regum Anglorum makes no mention of any brother, and merely states that it was Ivar and Halfdan who fought and died in Devon.) These numbers roughly give about thirty-six-and-a-half men per ship, which is comparable to the 32-oared Gokstad ship, a 9th-century Viking ship unearthed in Norway.

On one hand, it is possible that the Viking commander at Arx Cynuit seized upon Guthrum's simultaneous campaigning against the West Saxons to launch a Viking foray of his from Dyfed. On the other hand, the location and timing of the engagement at Arx Cynuit may indicate that the slain commander was cooperating with Guthrum. As such, there is reason to suspect that the two Viking armies coordinated their efforts in an attempt to corner Alfred in a pincer movement after his defeat at Chippenham and subsequent withdrawal into the wetlands of Somerset. If the Vikings at Arx Cynuit were indeed working in cooperation with those at Chippenham, the record of their presence in Dyfed could also have been related to Guthrum's campaign against Alfred. As such, they could have been campaigning against Hyfaidd ap Bleddri, King of Dyfed (died 892/893) before their attack at Arx Cynuit. (Note: Although Hyfaidd's political alignment in 877 is unknown, he was certainly an ally of Alfred by 885. The version of events given by Historia de sancto Cuthberto has it that, after the destruction of the Northumbrian kingdom, and the devastation of northern and southern England, the forces of Ubba and Halfdan split in three. Whilst one part settled and rebuilt in the region of York, another part positioned itself in Mercia. Another part is stated to have commenced a campaigned against the South Saxons, and forced Alfred to seek refuge in a Glastonbury marsh "in great want".)

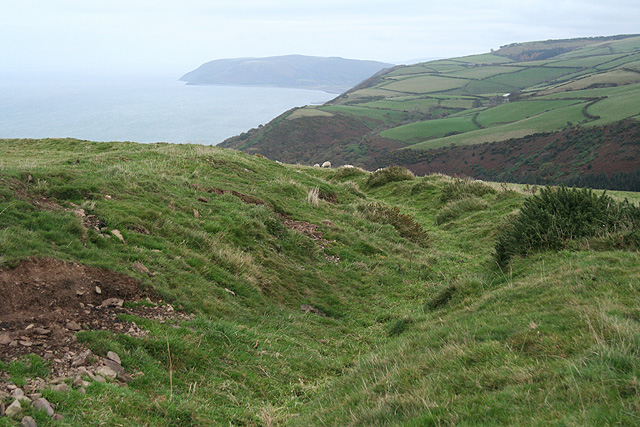
Old Burrow, near Countisbury, the site of a ruined Roman fortress, is another possible site of Arx Cynuit.

It is possible that the defeat at Arx Cynuit left Guthrum overextended in Wessex, allowing Alfred's forces to assail Guthrum's exposed lines of communication. Although Alfred's position may have been still perilous in the aftermath, with his contracted kingdom close to collapse, the victory at Arx Cynuit certainly foreshadowed a turn of events for the West Saxons. A few weeks later in May, the Anglo-Saxon Chronicle records that Alfred was able to assemble his troops, and launch a successful attack against Guthrum at Edington. Following Guthrum's crushing defeat, the Vikings were forced to accept Alfred's terms for peace. Guthrum was baptised as a Christian, and led the remainder of his forces into East Anglia, where they dispersed and settled. Guthrum thereafter kept peace with the West Saxons, and ruled as a Christian king for more than a decade, until his death in 890. (Note: The father of Oda, Archbishop of Canterbury (died 958) was a Viking who settled in Anglo-Saxon England with the army of Ubba and Ivar, as evidenced by Vita Oswaldi.)

== Medieval legend of Ragnar Lodbrok ==
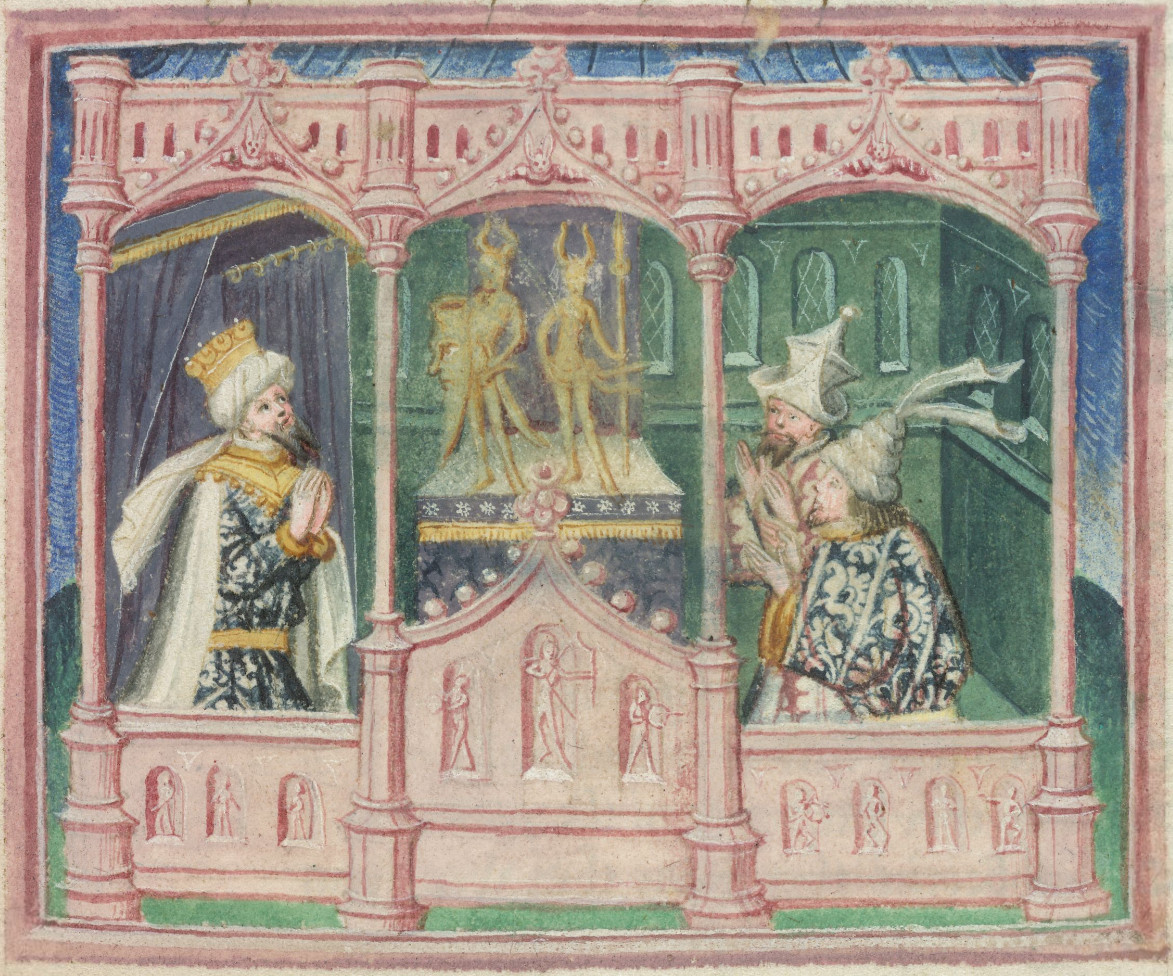
A depiction of Ragnar Lodbrok (Lothbrok) and his sons, Ivar and Ubba, worshipping pagan idols, as it appears on folio 39r of British Library Harley 2278. This illustration depicts the pagan Danes as elaborately dressed Muslim Saracens, wearing tall turban-like headdresses and forked beards. Other illustrations in the manuscript, depicting Ivar and Ubba, show Vikings armed with curved swords. (Note: This depiction of the Danes in this illustration contrasts the depictions of Edmund elsewhere in the manuscript, where he is presented engaging in royal activities.)

Although Ubba and Ivar are associated with each other by Passio sancti Eadmundi, the men are not stated to be related in any way. The earliest source claiming kinship between the two is the Annals of St Neots, an 11th- or 12th-century account stating that they were brothers of three daughters of Lodbrok (Lodebrochus). This source further states that these three sisters wove a magical banner named Reafan that was captured at the Arx Cynuit conflict. Although certain versions of the Anglo-Saxon Chronicle also note the capture of a raven banner, named Hræfn ("Raven"), they do not mention any magical attributes, or refer to Lodbrok and his progeny. (Note: It is possible that the association of Ubba with Ivar given by the Annals of St Neots is derived from Passio sancti Eadmundi. The capture of the raven banner is noted by the "B", "C", "D", and "E" versions of the Anglo-Saxon Chronicle. It is not noted by the "A" and "F" versions, or either by Vita Alfredi and Chronicon Æthelweardi. As such, it is uncertain whether the reports of a raven banner represent an historical event. The source from which the author of the Annals of St Neots drew these details is unknown. Whilst it is possible that its story is derived from the "B", "C", "D", and "E" versions of the Anglo-Saxon Chronicle, it is unknown why the earliest version of the chronicle fails to include this material. The notice of the banner preserved by the 10th-century "B" version of the Anglo-Saxon Chronicle is the earliest attestation of a gúþfana ("war banner") in Anglo-Saxon England. Nevertheless, this version of the chronicle dates at least a century after the event, which could mean that the banner's classification as a gúþfana is anachronistic. This entry is also the earliest record of a raven banner. It is possible that the motif of the raven banner, associated with figures such as Cnute the Great (died 1035), Siward, Earl of Northumbria (died 1055), and Sigurd the Stout (died 1014), is derived from traditions concerning the legend of Ragnar Lodbrok and his asserted his family.)

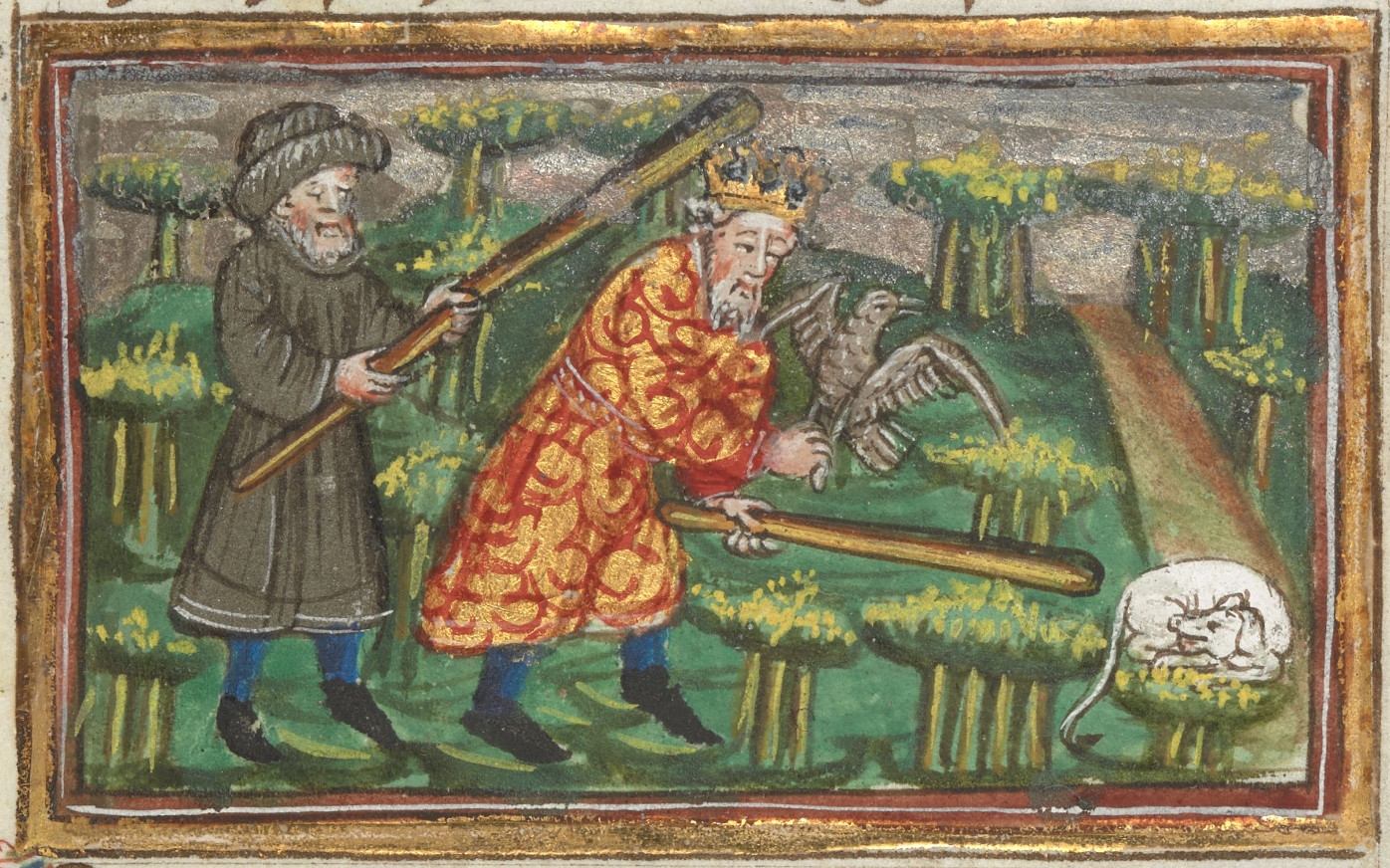
A 15th-century depiction of Lodbrok's murder by Björn as it appears on folio 34r of British Library Yates Thompson 47 (Lives of Saints Edmund and Fremund)

Lodbrok appears to be an early reference to Ragnar Lodbrok, a saga character of dubious historicity, who could be an amalgam of several historical 9th-century figures. (Note: Forms of the names Ragnarr and Loðbrók are only used together for this character by Scandinavian sources, and are first used by the 12th-century Íslendingabók. As such, there is no evidence of a figure named Ragnarr loðbrók before the twelfth century. One possible historical prototype for this literary character is Reginheri, a Viking commander recorded to have raided Paris in 845. The earliest record of a form of the name Loðbrók in English sources—and the first source to assign Ubba and Ivar as sons of this figure—is the account of the raven banner given by Annals of St Neots. Forms of the name Loðbrók are first attested by the 11th-century texts Gesta Normannorum ducum and Gesta Hammaburgensis ecclesiae pontificum. Whilst the former makes note of a king named Lodbrok (Lotbrocus), the father of a Viking named Björn (Bier Costae ferreae), the latter source makes note of a man named Lodbrok (Lodparchus), the father of a Viking king named Ivar. There is also reason to suspect that the character Ragnar Lodbrok is partly derived from a woman named Loðbróka.) According to Scandinavian sources, Ragnar Lodbrok was a Scandinavian of royal stock, whose death at the hands of Ælla in Northumbria was the catalyst of the invasion of Anglo-Saxon England—and Ælla's own destruction—by Ragnar Lodbrok's vengeful sons. None of the saga-sources for the legend of Ragnar Lodbrok accord him a son that corresponds to Ubba. The latter is only specifically attested by sources dealing with the East Scandinavian tradition. One of these sources is the 13th-century Gesta Danorum. According to this text, Ubba was the son of Ragnar Lodbrok and an unnamed daughter of a certain Hesbernus. Gesta Danorum does not associate Ubba with Anglo-Saxon England in any way. (Note: According to this account, at one point Ubba revolted againstRagnar Lodbrok at the behest of Hesbernus, and afterwards Ragnar Lodbrok slew Hesbernus, overcame the rebellion, and reconciled himself with Ubba. Halfdan is not identified as a son of Ragnar Lodbrok in any Scandinavian source. The first Scandinavian source to claim kinship between Ubba, Ivar, and Lodbrok, is the 12th-century Chronicon Roskildense. This source is also the earliest Danish source to make note of Lodbrok and his sons. According to Sǫgubrot af nokkrum fornkonungum, Ubbi fríski slew Rǫgnvaldr hái at Brávellir, a man also known as Raðbarðr hnefi. This slain figure equates to Rǫgnvaldr (Regnaldus), a figure attested by Gesta Danorum who is described as a nephew or grandson of Raðbarðr (Rathbartus). The Old Norse hnefi can either mean "fist" or refer to a piece in a board game. On one hand, it is possible that the compiler of Gesta Danorum transformed this epithet into the Latin nepos, meaning "nephew" or "grandson". On the other hand, the epithet given by Sǫgubrot af nokkrum fornkonungum may merely be a corruption of nepos. In any case, Gesta Danorum also accords Ragnar Lodbrok sons with the names Rǫgnvaldr (Regnaldus) and Raðbarðr (Rathbartus).) According to the 13th- or 14th-century Ragnarssona þáttr, a source that forms part of the West Scandinavian tradition, Ivar had two bastard brothers, Yngvar and Husto, who tortured Edmund on Ivar's instructions. No other source mentions these sons. It is possible that these figures represent Ivar and Ubba, and that the composer of Ragnarssona þáttr failed to recognise the names of Ivar and Ubba in English sources concerned with the legend of Edmund's martyrdom. (Note: In some cases, the Old Norse personal names Ingvarr and Yngvarr represent Ívarr. It is possible that Hústó is a corrupt form of Hubbo, and therefore stems from a Latin source. Chronicon Roskildense seems to suffer a problem similar to that of Ragnarssona þáttr, since it accords Lodbrok with sons bearing forms of the same two names. This suggests that Ragnarssona þáttr may be partly derived from Chronicon Roskildense, or that both texts were influenced from English sources pertaining to the legend of Edmund. The 13th-century Annales Lundenses likewise accords Lodbrok with sons bearing forms of these names. The bastardy accorded to Yngvarr and Hústó by Ragnarssona þáttr may be a device to help explain the cruelty that they inflicted upon the saintly Edmund.)

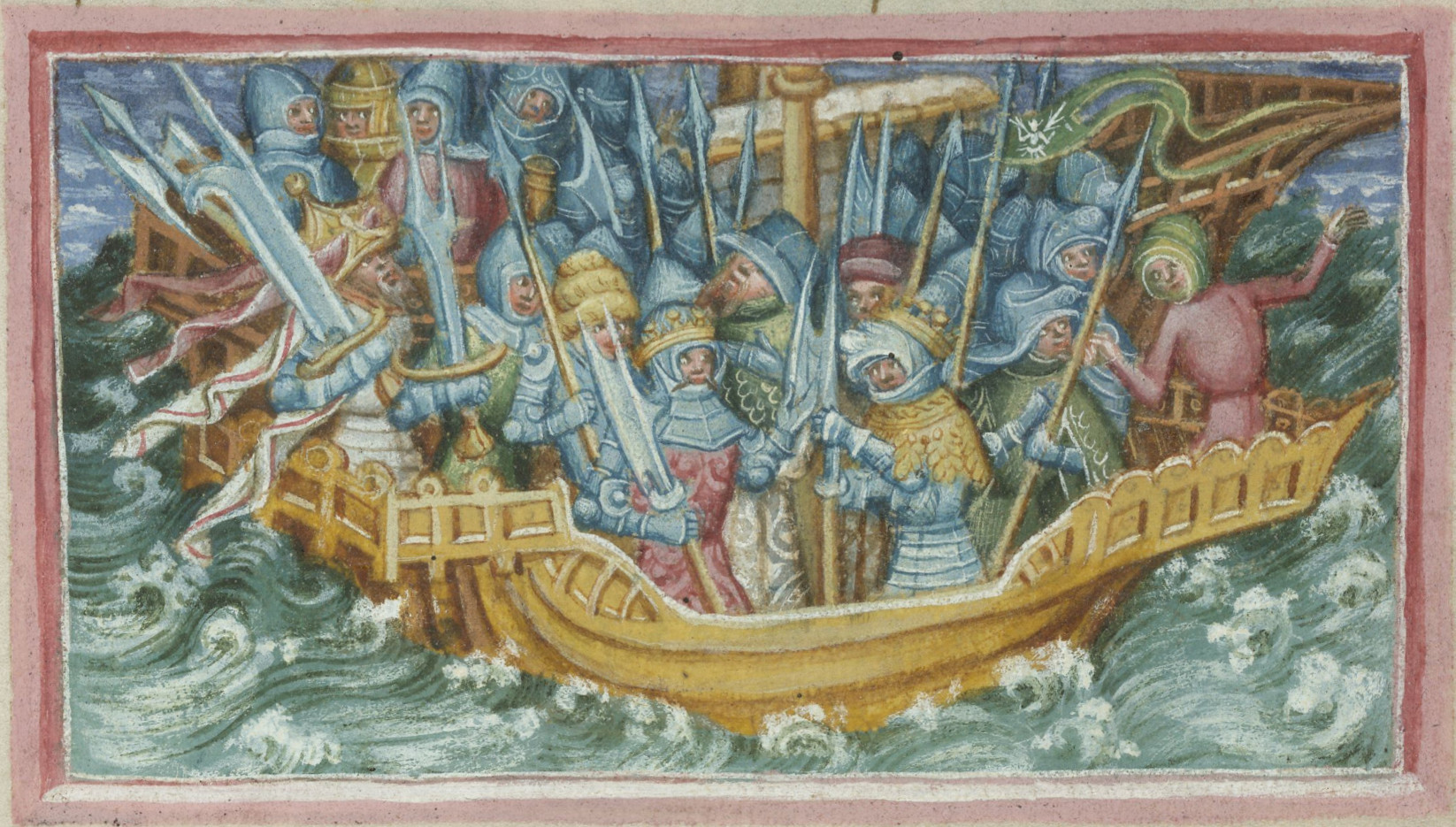
A depiction of Ivar and Ubba setting forth to avenge their father, Lodbrok, as it appears on folio 47v of British Library Harley 2278 (Note: The Lives of Saints Edmund and Fremund consists of over three thousand lines of poetry, and is the most elaborate version of the legend of Edmund. It portrays the invasion of Ivar and Ubba as an act motivated by envy of Edmund, and by the misplaced need to avenge their father's murder upon him. Whilst Liber de infantia sancti Eadmundi portrays their mocking father (Lodbrok) as a foil to Edmund, the Lives of Saints Edmund and Fremund portrays Lodbrok as a virtuous pagan, who disdained the rapine of his sons and admired the generosity and nobility of Edmund.)

Whilst Scandinavian sources—such as the 13th-century Ragnars saga loðbrókar—tend to locate the legend of Ragnar Lodbrok in a Northumbrian context, English sources tend to place them in an East Anglian setting. The earliest source to specifically associate the legend with East Anglia is Liber de infantia sancti Eadmundi, a 12th-century account depicting the Viking invasion of East Anglia in the context of a dynastic dispute. According to this source, Lodbrok (Lodebrok) was extremely envious of Edmund's fame. As such, it is Lodbrok's taunts that provoke his sons, Ivar, Ubba and Björn (Bern), to slay Edmund and destroy his kingdom. (Note: A similar account is given by the 12th-century La vie seint Edmund le rei, which gives the same tale of Lodbrok's (Lothebrok) taunts, and of his jealous sons, Ivar, Ubba, and Björn (Bern). La vie seint Edmund le rei is probably derived from Passio sancti Eadmundi, Liber de infantia sancti Eadmundi, Estoire des Engleis, and the 12th-century Roman de Brut. La vie seint Edmund le rei is the first extended account of Edmund's legend in French. Another French text making note of Ívarr and Ubba, and their part in the legend of Edmund, is the 13th-century Passiun de Seint Edmund, a source mainly derived from Passio sancti Eadmundi. Passiun de Seint Edmund also states that Ivar and Ubba were responsible for the martyrdom of (the seventh-century Northumbrian king) Oswald.) Although this text is heavily dependent upon Passio sancti Eadmundi for its depiction of Edmund's death, it appears to be the first source to meld the martyrdom with the legend of Ragnar Lodbrok. (Note: Whilst Liber de infantia sancti Eadmundi may owe its information on Lodbrok and Björn to Gesta Normannorum ducum, the latter account cannot be the source for the identification of Ivar and Ubba as other sons of Lodbrok. According to Liber de infantia sancti Eadmundi, Ubba possessed diabolical powers that enabled him to gain victory in battle if he was lifted above his enemies. Magical powers are also attributed to Ubba by La vie seint Edmund le rei. A similar motif is given by Ragnars saga loðbrókar, although this source instead attributes sorcerous abilities to Ivar. Historia Anglorum accords remarkable cunning to Ivar and extraordinary courage to Ubba. At one point, Passio sancti Eadmundi declares that, before the fateful invasion of Anglo-Saxon England, rumours of Edmund's vigour and military prowess reached Ivar. One possibility is that this passage is the origin of the later stories of Lodbrok scorning his sons on account of Edmund's accomplishments. In any case, the earliest source to specifically associate Ragnar Lodbrok's family with the legend of Edmund's martyrdom is Íslendingabók, which attributes Edmund's demise to Ivar, son of Ragnar Lodbrok. The source of this claim is unknown. The earliest account to identify Ivar as a son of someone who seems to equate to Ragnar Lodbrok is Gesta Hammaburgensis ecclesiae pontificum.)

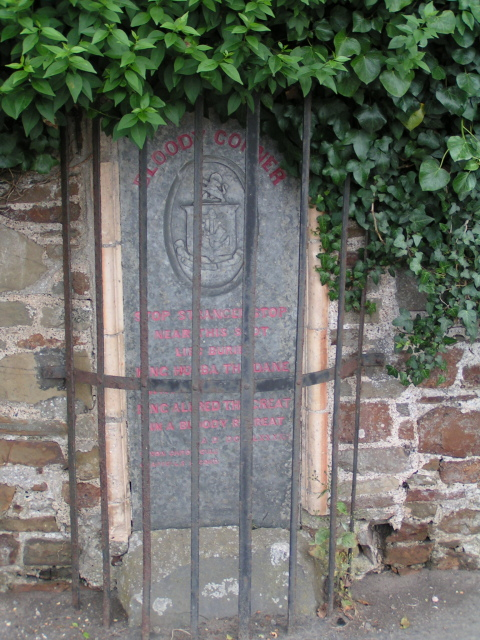
An inscribed plaque at "Bloody Corner", between Appledore and Northam. In the early 19th century, it was imagined that this spot may have marked the site of Ubba's demise. (Note: Over the years this conjecture evolved into local tradition, and the plaque was raised before the end of the nineteenth century. The inscription reads in part: "Stop stranger stop/Near this spot lies buried/King Hubba the Dane/Who was slayed in a bloody retreat/By King Alfred the Great". In 2009, a stone monument was raised in Appledore to commemorate this tradition of Ubba. It is sometimes romanticised that the village of Hubberston in Pembrokeshire is named after Ubba, and that he overwintered in nearby Milford Haven. There is no evidence for this assertion. Rather than being Scandinavian in origin, the name is derived from the Old Germanic personal name Hubert. The name of the town is first recorded in the thirteenth century as Hobertiston and Villa Huberti, meaning "Hubert's Farm", "Hubert's manor", and "Hubert's tūn". The village has only been known as Hubberston since the early seventeenth century. One possibility is that the town's eponym is identical to Hubertus, a man of Pembrokeshire, attested by the 12th-century Pipe Rolls of Henry I, King of England (died 1135).)

By the 13th century an alternate rendition of the story appears in sources such as Chronica majora, and both the Wendover and Paris versions of Flores historiarum. For example, the Wendover account states that Lodbrok (Lothbrocus) washed ashore in East Anglia, where he was honourably received by Edmund, but afterwards murdered by Björn (Berno), an envious huntsman. Although the latter is expelled from the realm, he convinces Lodbrok's sons, Ivar and Ubba, that the killer of their father was Edmund. As such, East Anglia is invaded by these two sons, and Edmund is killed in a case of misplaced vengeance. (Note: These 13th-century compositions are the earliest accounts to associate the legend of Ragnar Lodbrok's death with that of Edmund. A similar, but much later story, presented by Historia monasterii sancti Augustini Cantuariensis, relates that Edmund was the killer of a bear that was the father of Ivar and Ubba. A version of the Wendover account is given by Vita et passio cum miraculis sancti Edmundi, preserved by the 14th-century Oxford Bodleian Library Bodley 240. Vita et passio cum miraculis sancti Edmundi is the earliest hagiographic source of Edmund's legend to present the king taking up arms against the Vikings.) A slightly different version of events is offered by Estoire des Engleis, which states that the Vikings invaded Northumbria on behalf of Björn (Buern Bucecarle), who sought vengeance for the rape of his wife by the Northumbrian king, Osberht. (Note: According to this version of events, Ælla is a lowly knight who became king after Osberht had been driven from the throne by Björn's relatives. A somewhat similar version of events is presented by Chronicon Joannis Bromton and Eulogium historiarum sive temporis, sources that present Ivar and Ubba as commanding the Danes that came overseas on behalf of Björn to topple Osberht. The mediaeval Prose Brut is another source giving a similar account. In the version of events outlined by the anonymous Narratio de uxore Aernulfi ab Ella rege Deirorum violata, Osberht is not mentioned, and it is Ælla who has committed rape during the invasion of Ivar and Ubba.) On one hand, it is possible that the theme of vengeance directed at Edmund is derived from the tradition of Ælla's demise in Northumbria at the hands of Ragnar's progeny. (Note: According to Ragnars saga loðbrókar, for example, Ragnar was killed by Ælla, who was in turn slain by Ragnar's sons, Ivar, Sigurd Snake-in-the-Eye, Björn Ironside, and Hvitserk. Whilst the figures Ivar and Björn are alluded to in the legend of Edmund's martyrdom (under various guises as in the case of Björn), no source associates Sigurd and Hvitserk with the legend.) On the other hand, the revenge motifs and miraculous maritime journeys presented in the accounts of Edmund are well-known elements commonly found in contemporaneous chivalric romances.

There is reason to suspect that the legend of Ragnar Lodbrok originated from attempts to explain why the Vikings came to settle in Anglo-Saxon England. The core of the tradition may have been constructed as a way to rationalise their arrival without assigning blame to either side (as illustrated by the sympathetic Wendover account). As such, the legend could have been intended to justify Edmund's violent demise. The tales may have evolved at an early stage of Viking settlement, and may have functioned as an origin myth of the emerging Anglo-Scandinavian culture. (Note: Similarly, the Northumbrian-focused accounts of the legend of Ragnar Lodbrok, as given by Scandinavian sources, could have originated as a way to white-wash history by relocating the tale of regicide from East Anglia to Northumbria, replacing the saintly Edmund with the obscure Ælla. Ubba appears to be the prototype of a like-named character (Ubbe) who appears in the thirteenth- or 14th-century Middle English Havelok the Dane. Within the tale, Ubba is closely associated with a character (Bernard Brun) who appears to correlate to Björn. Both Ubba and Björn are depicted as loyal and distinguished Danes, and there is reason to suspect that they and other characters were used to add a veneer of historicity to a story exploring the Anglo-Scandinavian contribution to the English identity. Since Ubba was otherwise widely asserted as one of the perpetrators of Edmund's martyrdom, one possibility is that he was inserted into the romance as a way to cast doubt upon any lingering anti-Danish sentiment. Much like the legend of Ragnar Lodbrok the motif of personal revenge plays a prominent role in the tale of Havelok, with revenge used to justify Danish invasions of England.) The shared kinship assigned to Ivar and Ubba within the legend of Ragnar Lodbrok may stem from their combined part in Edmund's downfall as opposed to any historical familial connection.

== In popular culture ==
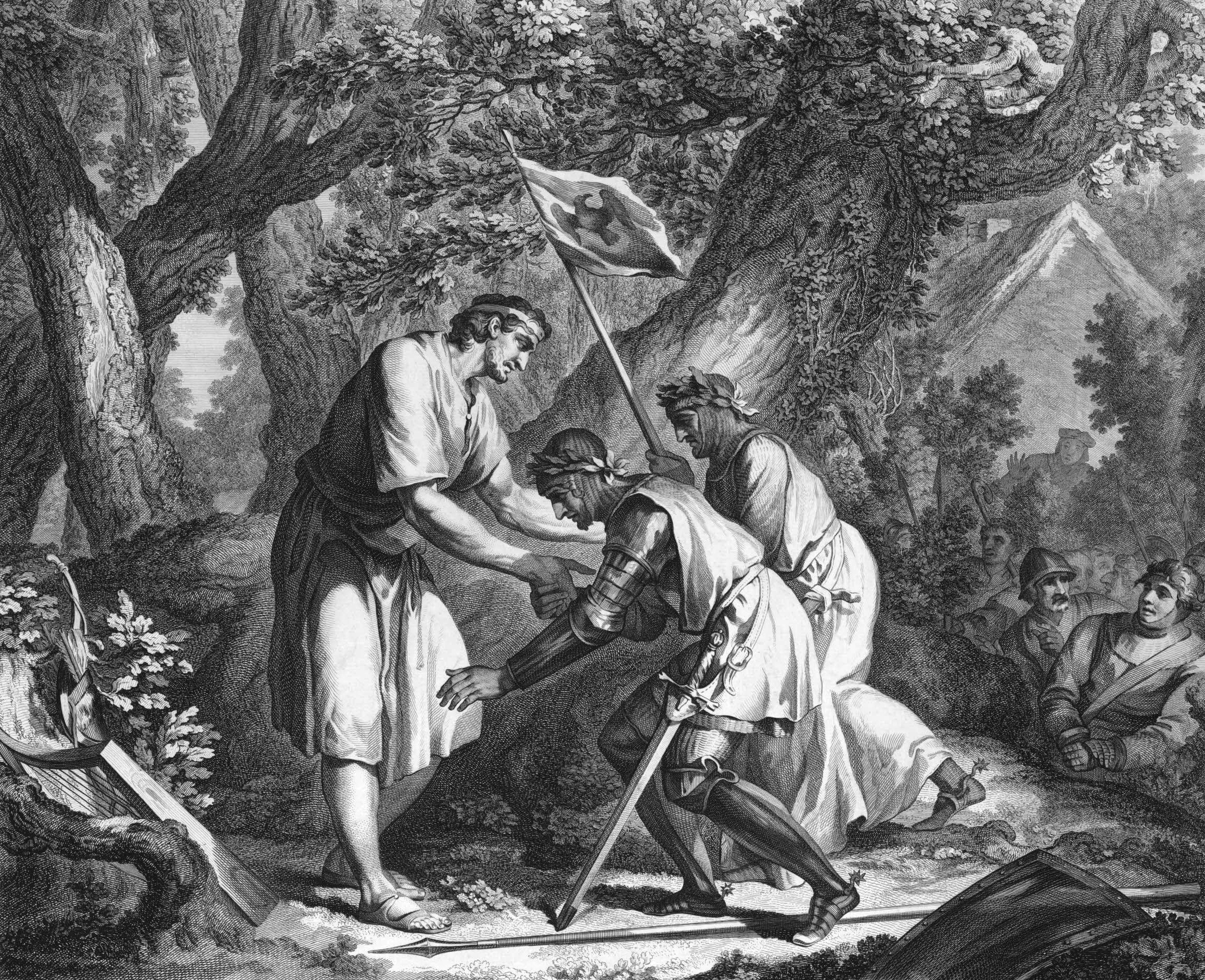
Alfred in the Isle of Athelney, receiving news of a Victory over the Danes, an 18th-century depiction of Alfred, King of Wessex learning of the Viking defeat at Arx Cynuit (Note: The illustration depicts Alfred receiving the raven banner captured at Arx Cynuit. The scene is probably derived from the History of England, by Paul de Rapin (died 1725), which portrays the battle—and the death of Ubba—as the decisive turning-point of Alfred's struggle against the Vikings. The raven banner may be borrowed from an engraved portrait of Alfred by George Vertue (died 1756). It was after the publication of Vertue's portrait that the banner came to associated with Alfredian art. For example, it also appears in an engraved portrait of the king by B. Cole, for the New Universal Magazine of 1752; and another image by Samuel Wale (died 1786) in the 1760s. This latter depiction was published in the New History of England of 1764–1769, by John Hamilton Mortimer (died 1779); and in the New and Universal History of England of 1771–1772, by William Henry Mountague; and reused in A New and Complete History of England of 1773, by Temple Sydney; and in A New and Authentic History of England of 1777–1779, by William Augustus Russel.)

Ubba appears as a character in modern historical fiction. For example, the unnamed Danish king that appears in Alfred: A Masque, a musical play with a libretto by James Thomson (died 1748) and David Mallet (died 1765)—first presented in 1740—may be a composite of Ubba, Guthrum, Ivar and Halfdan. Ubba certainly appears in Alfred the Great, Deliverer of His Country, an anonymous play that first appears on record in 1753; and The Magick Banner; or, Two Wives in a House, a play by John O'Keeffe (died 1833), first presented in 1796. (Note: The play was first presented as The Magick Banner; or, Two Wives in a House, and published later in 1798 as Alfred; or The Magic Banner.) He also appears in the Sketch of Alfred the Great: Or, the Danish Invasion, a ballet by Mark Lonsdale, first performed in 1798; and Alfred; An Epic Poem, a long piece of epic poetry by Henry James Pye (died 1813), published in 1801; and the similarly named Alfred, an Epic Poem, by Joseph Cottle (died 1853)—a poem almost twice as long as Pye's—first published in 1800.

Ubba later appears in Alfred the Great; Or, The Enchanted Standard, a musical drama by Isaac Pocock (died 1835), based upon O'Keeffe's play, and first performed in 1827; and Alfred the Great, a play by James Magnus, dating to 1838. He further appears in Alfred of Wessex, an epic poem by Richard Kelsey, published in 1852; and in the 1899 novel King Alfred's Viking, by Charles Whistler (died 1913); and the 2004 novel The Last Kingdom by Bernard Cornwell. Ubba is also a character in Vikings, a television series first aired on the History network in 2013. His name was changed to Ubbe, and he was portrayed by Jordan Patrick Smith from season 4B through the end.

In 2015, BBC Two released The Last Kingdom, a fictional television series (based upon Cornwell's The Saxon Chronicles series of novels). It was later aired on Netflix. Although the series and many of its characters were based on real events and people, the series also contains fictional events. The character was portrayed a little differently than the real-life Ubba. Ubba is played by actor Rune Temte.

Ubba, Halfdan and Ivar the Boneless appear in the Ubisoft video game Assassin's Creed Valhalla as brothers, sharing significant roles in the story of Viking conquests of England during the 9th century.
