= Wulfsige =

Wulfsige is an Anglo-Saxon name that can refer to a number of people.

- Wulfsige (bishop of Cornwall) (died between 981 and 993).
- Wulfsige of Lichfield (died between 866 and 869), Bishop of Lichfield.
- Wulfsige (bishop of Lichfield) (died 1053), also known as Wulsy.
- Wulfsige of London (died between 909 and 926), Bishop of London.
- Wulfsige I (died between 890 and 900), Bishop of Sherborne.
- Wulfsige II (died between 958 and 964), Bishop of Sherborne.
- Wulfsige III (died 1002), Bishop of Sherborne.
- Wulfsige of York (died between 830 and 837), Bishop of York.
- Wulfsige Maur (fl. 942) landowner and possibly Ealdorman of Mercia.
