= Scammell (disambiguation) =

Scammell was a British truck manufacturer.

Scammel or Scammell may also refer to:

== People ==
- Scammell (surname)
- Walter Scammel (died 1286), Bishop of Salisbury
- Arthur Scammell

== United States Revenue Service vessels ==
- USRC Scammel (1791), a revenue cutter in service from 1791 to 1798
- USRC Scammel (1798), a 14-gun schooner commissioned in 1798

== Other uses ==
- Fort Scammell, House Island, Maine, United States
- Laurence, Laura and Honor Scammel, characters in New Street Law, a British television series

== See also ==
- Scammell's 1781 Light Infantry Regiment, an American Continental Army unit in 1781
