= Eahlstan =

9th-century Bishop of Sherborne

Ealhstan
- Bishop of Sherborne
- Appointed: 824
- Term ended: 867
- Predecessor: Wigberht
- Successor: Heahmund

Orders
- Consecration: between 816 and 825

Personal details
- Died: 867
- Denomination: Christian

Ealhstan (Note: Or Alfstan or Ealhstan) was a medieval Bishop of Sherborne.

Ealhstan was consecrated between 816 and 825. He died in 867. According to the Anglo-Saxon Chronicle, he died in 867 after holding office for fifty years. However, a forged charter (S 283) of 824 appears to copy a genuine witness list of the mid-820s, and this describes Ealhstan as "electus in episcopatum Scireburnensis æcclesiæ" (appointed to the status of bishop to be at the archdiocese of sherborne), implying that he was not appointed until 824. This would be consistent with the absence of a bishop of Sherborne from records of the Council of Clofesho of 824.

In the ninth century, the region "west of Selwood" formed a separate political entity within the kingdom of Wessex. According to Richard Abels in his biography of Alfred the Great, the region

gained much of whatever political coherence it possessed from its ecclesiastical organization. The huge diocese of Sherborne in the ninth century stretched over Dorset, Somerset, Devonshire and Cornwall. In Alfred's youth, Bishop Ealhstan was undoubtedly the most politically powerful force in the south-west and one of the most influential magnates in all Wessex.

In 825, after the defeat of the Mercians at the Battle of Ellandun, he was sent by King Egbert of Wessex with Egbert's son, the future King Æthelwulf, and an army to take control of Kent. According to Alfred the Great's contemporary biographer Asser, when King Æthelwulf returned from pilgrimage to Rome in 855, his son Æthelbald, together with Ealhstan and Eanwulf, ealdorman of Somerset, conspired to keep the king from recovering his crown.

According to William of Malmesbury Ealhstan "subjected Malmesbury Abbey to his own purposes", even though the abbey was in the neighbouring diocese of Winchester. He was probably the dominant figure in the West Saxon church in Æthelbald's reign and in the years until his death. According to Asser, "Ealhstan, bishop of the church of Sherborne, after he had ruled the bishopric honourably for fifty years, went the way of all flesh; he was buried in peace at Sherborne".

== Citations ==
Christian titles
Preceded by Wigberht	Bishop of Sherborne c. 820–867	Succeeded by Heahmund
