= Ælfwold II (bishop of Sherborne) =

11th-century Bishop of Sherborne and saint

- Bishop of Sherborne
- Appointed: 1045
- Term ended: 1058
- Predecessor: Brithwine II
- Successor: Herman

Orders
- Consecration: 1045

Personal details
- Died: 1058
- Denomination: Christianity

Sainthood
- Feast day: 25 March
- Venerated in: Catholic Church
- Shrines: Sherborne Abbey, Dorset (destroyed)

Ælfwold II (Note: Latin: Ælfwoldus, Ælfvoldus, or Alfvoldus) (died 1058) was a Bishop of Sherborne in Dorset. He is venerated as a saint in the Catholic Church.

== Life ==
Little is known of Ælfwold apart from the information given by William of Malmesbury. He was at first a monk of Winchester, then was consecrated Bishop of Sherborne in 1045, succeeding his own brother Brithwine. His frugality of life served as a powerful contrast to the contemporary custom of riotous banqueting after the example of the Danish monarchs.

Ælfwold showed great devotion to Saint Swithun, his old patron of Winchester, and also to Saint Cuthbert, to whose shrine at Durham he made a pilgrimage. He died while singing the antiphon of Saint Cuthbert. He was in a sense the last Bishop of Sherborne, as after his death the see of Sherborne was united to that of Ramsbury in Wiltshire.

Ælfwold died in 1058. He is venerated as a saint in the Catholic Church.

== Citations ==
Christian titles
Preceded by Brithwine II	Bishop of Sherborne; 1045–1058	Succeeded by Herman
