= Treaty of Rouen (991) =

Treaty between Ethelred the Unready and Richard I, Duke of Normandy

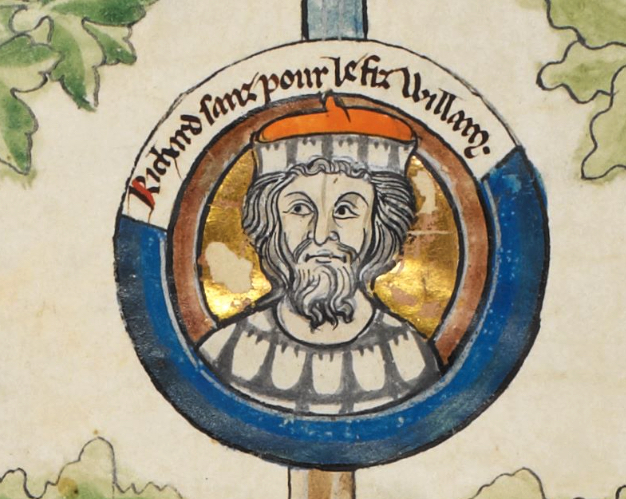
Manuscript image of Richard I, Duke of Normandy.

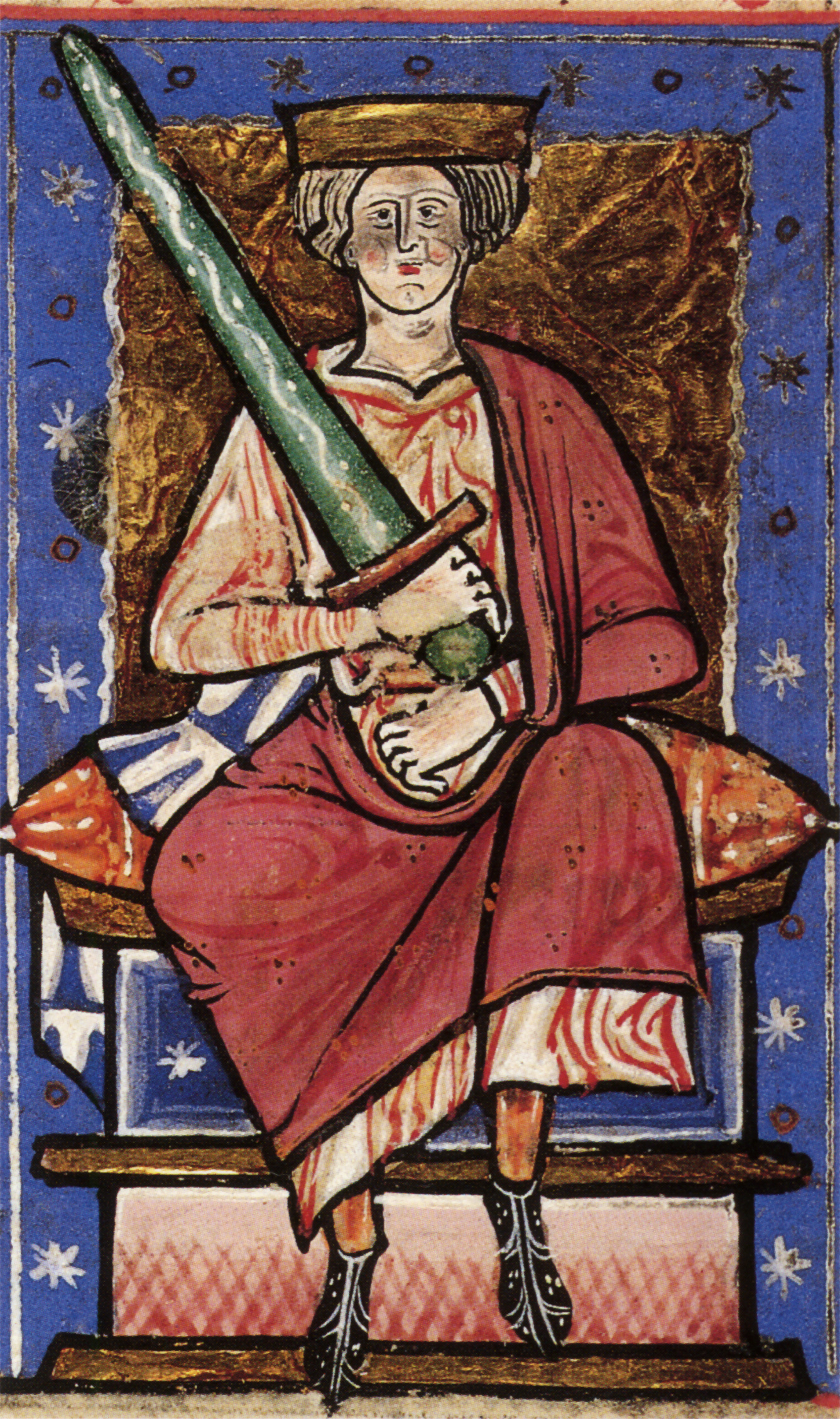
Portrait of Æthelred II, king of the West Saxons

The Treaty of Rouen was an agreement made between Æthelred II, king of the English and Richard I, Duke of Normandy. The treaty comes down to us in the form of a letter, written in the name of Pope John XV. The agreement between the two rulers was completed on 1 March 991 and is understood to be one of the earliest arbitration treaties in European history.

== The treaty ==
The letter from Pope John XV has been translated into English by Dorothy Whitelock. It tells us that, having ‘been informed by many of the enmity between Ethelred, King of the West Saxons, and Richard the marquis [Duke of Normandy]’, Pope John XV had decided to send his legate, Bishop Leo of Trevi, to rectify this breakdown of relations.

The bishop of Trevi arrived in England and presented the pope’s letter to Æthelred on Christmas Day, 990. After discussing the matter with ‘all the loyal men of his kingdom’, Æthelred agreed to make peace with Richard, and promised that this peace would last throughout all further generations of English rule.

After his decision was made, Æthelred sent Æthelsige, bishop of Sherborne, Leofstan and Æthelnoth with the pope’s legate to Normandy. After Richard heard the pope’s warning and Æthelred’s declaration of peace, he also agreed to make peace with the English king and for this peace to remain in place for every generation that came after him.

The terms of this peace agreement were as follows:

if any of their people, or they themselves, were to commit any wrong against the other, it should be atoned for with a fitting compensation; and the peace should remain for ever unshaken, and confirmed by the mark of the oaths of both parties...And Richard is to receive none of the king’s men, or of his enemies, nor the king any of his, without their seal.

== Historical context ==
While the letter indicates that the pope had intervened in this matter due to hostilities between the English king and the Duke of Normandy, it is not clearly stated what had caused these troubles. This has led to historians contributing various arguments as to what the issue between these two rulers was.

The most popular beliefs is that Richard had been allowing vikings to make use of his ports. It is well known that, after a generation of peace, England had begun to suffer from viking attacks from the 980s onwards. This new phase of raiding began within several months of Æthelred’s ascension to the throne, when he was around eleven years of age. The historian Eric John believes that the end of the papal letter, which states that neither man should receive the enemies of the other, is clearly prohibiting the use of Norman ports as a viking base. It is possible that the Normans were sympathetic towards the viking forces, as they were themselves of Scandinavian descent and many at the court were probably still bilingual. In this case, it is likely that the pope decided to intervene in order to remind Richard that it was unacceptable to aid pagans who pose a threat to his fellow Christians.

The historian Jenny Benham contested this theory, as much of the evidence which relates to vikings being given entry to Norman ports is written after this letter from Pope John XV. In this case, it would be more likely that the treaty was prohibiting either side from harbouring domestic enemies, such as exiles. There is evidence proving that people were exiled during the reign of Æthelred II; one example being the ealdorman of Mercia, Ælfric Cild, who was exiled in 985. The fact that Æthelred came to be king due to the murder of his brother also gives reason to believe that he may have had political enemies within his own country. Interestingly, the Anglo-Saxon Chronicle does not specifically place any viking forces in Normandy until the date 1000, stating ‘that summer the hostile fleet [the viking fleet] had gone to Richard’s kingdom’, challenging the assumption that Richard I was allowing viking raiders into his land.

== Aftermath ==
The peace treaty between the two rulers was one of Æthelred’s most successful diplomatic policies. This success was short lived however, as after the death of Richard I in 996 and the ultimate ascension of his son Richard II to the Duchy, relations between the two parties once again appear strained. The Anglo-Saxon Chronicle reported that the Normans received the Vikings after their raid in the year 1000; this breached the Treaty of Rouen. William of Jumièges wrote in the 1050s of an English attack on the Cotentin in Normandy: this probably occurred sometime between 1000 and 1002, and seems to have been a response to Richard's harbouring the raiders. Because of this breakdown of relations, negotiations were initiated once again between the English king and the new duke of Normandy, which culminated in the marriage of the duke’s sister Emma to Æthelred in 1002.
