= Frithugyth =

Consort of King Æthelheard of Wessex from 726 to 740

Consort of the King of Wessex
- Tenure: c. 726–740
- Spouse: Æthelheard of Wessex

Frithugyth (floruit 737) was the wife of King Æthelheard of Wessex (died 740).

Frithugyth married Æthelheard at some point in 729 or before for she is identified as "Queen Frithugyth" in Æthelheard's charter dated 729. Like her predecessor as Queen of Wessex, Æthelburg, wife of Ine of Wessex, Frithugyth is recorded in surviving charters, not merely witnessing her husband's donations of land to the church, but also making donations in her own right. Although the reliability of many of these charters is questionable, historian Barbara Yorke notes that "Queen Frithugyth would be an unlikely choice as donor in a completely fictitious" charter.

The principal donation attributed to Frithugyth is a sizable estate at Taunton, given to Winchester Cathedral in 737. This was expanded by later Kings of Wessex and England, including Æthelwulf, Æthelstan, and Eadred, who refer to Frithugyth's earlier donation.

Frithugyth is reported by the Anglo-Saxon Chronicle to have made a pilgrimage to Rome in 737 along with Forthhere, Bishop of Sherborne. The Chronicle offers no further information.

No descendants of Æthelheard and Frithugyth are known.

Frithugyth's husband Æthelheard died in 740 and was succeeded by Cuthred. It is not known if Frithugyth survived her husband.
