= Treaty of Rouen =

The Treaty of Rouen may refer to:

- Treaty of Rouen (991) - treaty signed in 991 between Æthelred II, king of the English and Richard I, Duke of Normandy
- Treaty of Rouen (1517) - treaty signed on 26 August 1517 between France and Scotland
