= Æthelbald =

Æthelbald (also Ethelbald or Aethelbald) may refer to:

- Æthelbald of Mercia, King of Mercia, 716–757
- Æthelbald, King of Wessex, 856–860
- Æthelbald of York, Archbishop of York, 900–904
- Æthelbald (bishop), bishop of Sherborne (died between 918 and 925)
