= Walter de la Wyle =

13th-century Bishop of Salisbury

- Bishop of Salisbury
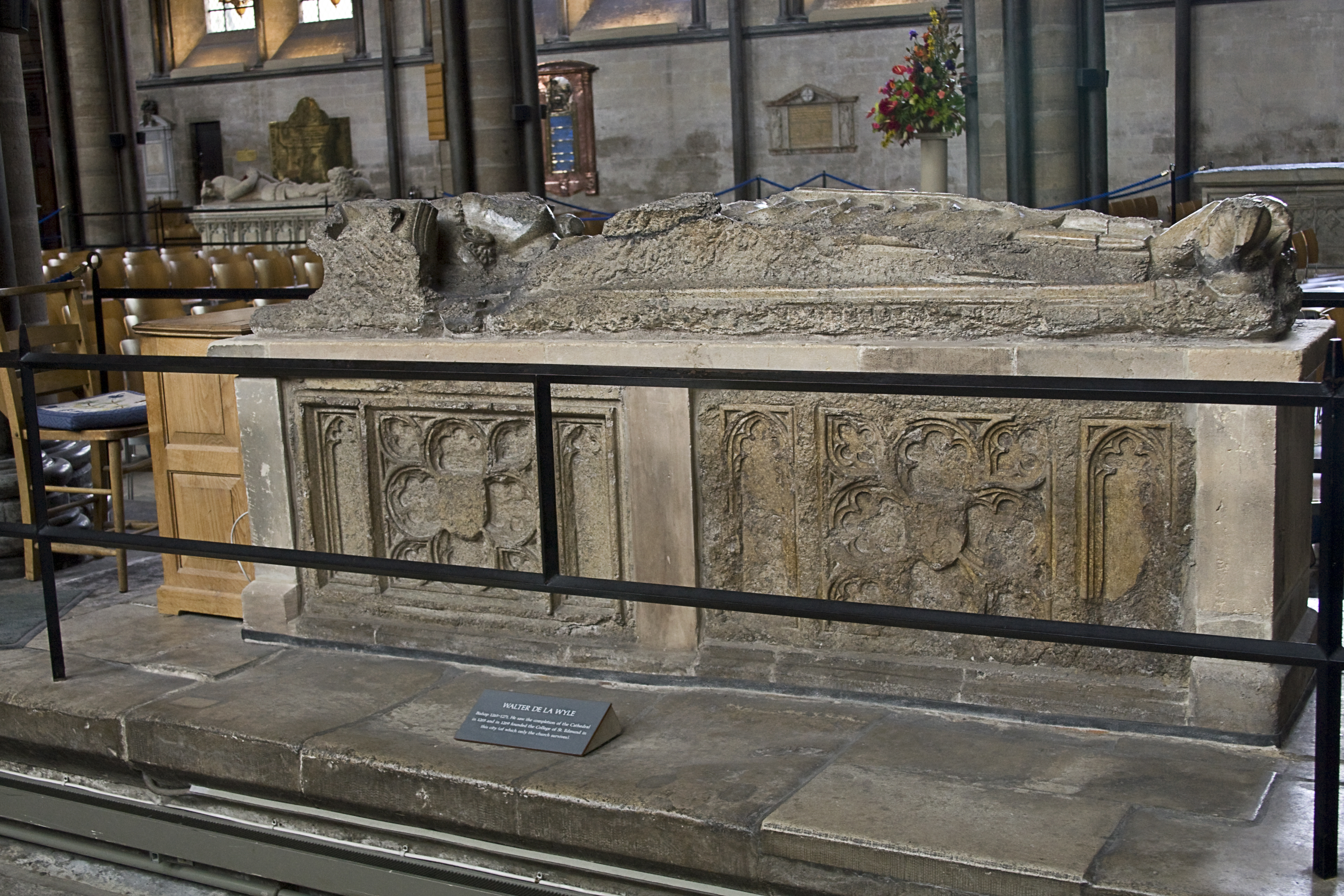
- The tomb of Walter de la Wyle in Salisbury Cathedral
- Elected: 29 January 1263
- Term ended: January 1271
- Predecessor: Giles of Bridport
- Successor: Robert Wickhampton
- Other post: Subcentor of Salisbury

Orders
- Consecration: 27 May 1263

Personal details
- Died: January 1271
- Denomination: Catholic

Walter de la Wyle was Bishop of Salisbury from 1263 to 1271, and the founder of St. Edmund's College, Salisbury.

== Biography ==
De la Wyle began his career as a chaplain to Robert de Bingham, which led to his appointment as warden of a bridge over the Avon connected with St. John's Hospital. Eventually Walter de la Wyle was elected succentor of Salisbury, one of the chief officers of a cathedral chapter, with responsibility for overseeing religious ritual in cathedral worship services. This was an especially prestigious position in Salisbury since the Sarum Rite, the order of service used at Salisbury Cathedral, was quickly becoming the most popular order of service in England. It was from the office of Succentor that Walter de la Wyle was elevated to the office of bishop on 29 January 1263 as the successor to Bishop Giles of Bridport. He was consecrated on 27 May 1263.

In 1269, he founded St Edmund's college, and at or around the same time a new parish of St. Edmund's was created to serve the growing population of Salisbury.

De la Wyle died on 3 or 4 January 1271.

== Sources ==
- Fryde, E. B.; Greenway, D. E.; Porter, S.; Roy, I. (1996). Handbook of British Chronology (Third revised ed.). Cambridge: Cambridge University Press. ISBN 0-521-56350-X.

Catholic Church titles
Preceded by Giles of Bridport	Bishop of Salisbury; 1263–1271	Succeeded by Robert Wickhampton
