= Roger Martival =

14th-century Bishop of Salisbury

- Bishop of Salisbury
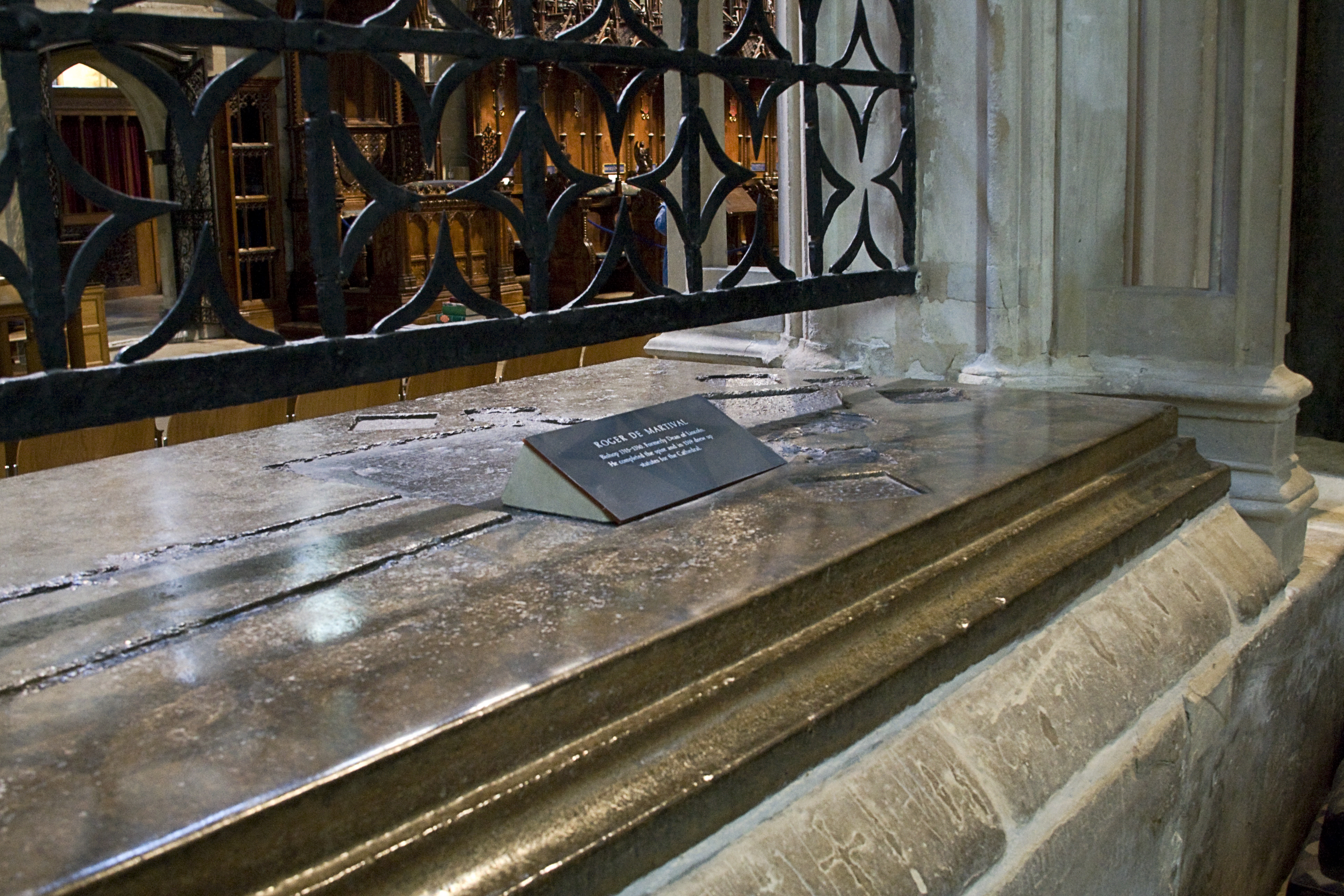
- Martival's tomb in Salisbury Cathedral
- Elected: about 11 June 1315
- Term ended: 14 March 1330
- Predecessor: Simon of Ghent
- Successor: Robert Wyvil

Orders
- Consecration: 28 September 1315

Personal details
- Died: 14 March 1330
- Denomination: Catholic

Roger Martival (died 14 March 1330) was a medieval Bishop of Salisbury in England.

Martival was Archdeacon of Huntingdon (1286–1295), Archdeacon of Leicester (1295–1310) and Dean of Lincoln (1310–1315). From 1293 to 1294, he was Chancellor of the University of Oxford.

Martival was elected as Bishop of Salisbury about 11 June 1315 and consecrated on 28 September 1315. He died 14 March 1330. He has a house named for him at Bishop Wordsworth's School, Salisbury.

== Citations ==
Academic offices
Preceded by Henry Swayne? or Simon of Ghent	Chancellor of the University of Oxford; 1293–1294	Succeeded by Peter de Medburn
Catholic Church titles
Preceded by Simon of Ghent	Bishop of Salisbury; 1315–1330	Succeeded by Robert Wyvil
