= Æthelmod (bishop) =

8th-century Bishop of Sherborne

Herewald
- Bishop of Sherborne
- Appointed: between 766 and 772
- Term ended: between 789 and 794
- Predecessor: Herewald
- Successor: Denefrith

Orders
- Consecration: between 766 and 774

Personal details
- Died: between 789 and 794
- Denomination: Christian

Æthelmod was a medieval Bishop of Sherborne.

Æthelmod was consecrated between 766 and 774. He died between 789 and 794.

== Citations ==
Christian titles
| Preceded by Herewald | Bishop of Sherborne c. 772–c. 791 | Succeeded by Denefrith |
