= Denefrith =

8th-century Bishop of Sherborne

- Bishop of Sherborne
- Appointed: 793
- Term ended: between 796 and 801
- Predecessor: Æthelmod
- Successor: Wigberht

Orders
- Consecration: 793

Personal details
- Died: between 796 and 801
- Denomination: Christian

Denefrith was a medieval Bishop of Sherborne.

Denefrith was consecrated in 793. He died between 796 and 801.

== Citations ==
Christian titles
Preceded by Æthelmod	Bishop of Sherborne; 793–c. 798	Succeeded by Wigberht
