= Ælfwold I (bishop of Sherborne) =

10th-century Bishop of Sherborne

Ælfwold
- Bishop of Sherborne
- Appointed: after 958 to around 963
- Term ended: 978
- Predecessor: Wulfsige II
- Successor: Æthelsige I

Orders
- Consecration: after 958 to around 963

Personal details
- Died: 978
- Denomination: Christian

Ælfwold (or Ælfwold I) was a medieval Bishop of Sherborne.

Ælfwold was consecrated after 958 to around 963. He died in 978.

== Citations ==
Christian titles
| Preceded by Wulfsige II | Bishop of Sherborne c. 962–978 | Succeeded by Æthelsige I |
