= Æthelweard (bishop of Sherborne) =

10th-century Bishop of Sherborne

- Bishop of Sherborne
- Appointed: c. 909
- Term ended: c. 909
- Predecessor: Asser
- Successor: Wærstan

Orders
- Consecration: c. 909

Personal details
- Died: c. 909
- Denomination: Christian

Æthelweard was a medieval Bishop of Sherborne.

Æthelweard was consecrated around 909. He died around 909.

== Citations ==
Christian titles
Preceded by Asser	Bishop of Sherborne c. 909	Succeeded by Wærstan
