= Scammell (surname) =

Scammell is a surname. Notable people with the surname include:

- Alexander Scammell (1742–1781), officer in the Continental Army during the American Revolutionary War
- Arthur Scammell (1913–1995), Newfoundland and Labrador writer
- Jack Henry Scammell (1894–1940), Newfoundland educator, journalist and politician
- Michael Scammell (born 1935), English author, biographer and translator of Slavic literature
- Pat Scammell (born 1961), Australian runner
- Roy Scammell (1932–2021), British stunt actor
- Terrence Scammell (British actor), born 1937
- Terrence Scammell (Canadian actor), born 1958
- Vanessa Scammell, Australian pianist and conductor
- William Scammell (1939–2000), British poet

== See also ==
- Walter Scammel (died 1286), Bishop of Salisbury
