= Herewald =

8th-century Bishop of Sherborne

- Bishop of Sherborne
- Appointed: 736
- Term ended: between 766 and 774
- Predecessor: Forthhere
- Successor: Æthelmod

Orders
- Consecration: 736

Personal details
- Died: between 766 and 774
- Denomination: Christian

Herewald was a medieval Bishop of Sherborne.

Herewald was consecrated in 736. He died between 766 and 774.

== Citations ==
Christian titles
Preceded by Forthhere	Bishop of Sherborne; 736–c. 770	Succeeded by Æthelmod
