= Ralph Ergham =

14th and 15th-century Bishop of Bath and Wells and Salisbury

- Bishop of Bath and Wells
- Appointed: 3 April 1388
- Term ended: 10 April 1400
- Predecessor: Walter Skirlaw
- Successor: Richard Clifford
- Previous post: Bishop of Salisbury

Orders
- Consecration: 9 December 1375

Personal details
- Died: 10 April 1400
- Denomination: Catholic

Ralph Ergham (or Erghum; died April 10,1400) was the English bishop of Salisbury from 1375 to 1388, and then bishop of Bath and Wells from 1388 to 1400.

Ergham was Chancellor of John of Gaunt, Duke of Lancaster from 1373 to 1377. On 12 October 1375 he was selected to be Bishop of Salisbury, and was consecrated on 9 December. On 3 April 1388, he was transferred to the see of Bath and Wells. Ergham was also a member of King Richard II's first council, representing John of Gaunt's interests. He died on 10 April 1400.

The executors of his will are named as: Agnes Rabbas, his sister; Thomas Tery, canon of Wells; and John Podemour.

== Citations ==
Catholic Church titles
Preceded by Robert Wyville	Bishop of Salisbury; 1375–1388	Succeeded by John Waltham
Preceded by Walter Skirlaw	Bishop of Wells; 1388–1400	Succeeded by Richard Clifford
