= Æthelric (bishop of Sherborne) =

11th-century Bishop of Sherborne

- Bishop of Sherborne
- Appointed: 1002
- Term ended: between 1011 and 1012
- Predecessor: Wulfsige III
- Successor: Æthelsige II

Orders
- Consecration: 1002

Personal details
- Died: between 1011 and 1012
- Denomination: Christian

Æthelric (or Athelric) was a medieval Bishop of Sherborne.

Æthelric was consecrated in 1002. He died between 1011 and 1012.

== Citations ==
Christian titles
Preceded by Wulfsige	Bishop of Sherborne c. 1001–c. 1011	Succeeded by Æthelsige II
