= Alfred of Sherborne =

10th-century Bishop of Sherborne

Alfred
- Bishop of Sherborne
- Appointed: between 932 and 934
- Term ended: between 939 and 943
- Predecessor: Sigehelm
- Successor: Wulfsige II

Orders
- Consecration: between 932 and 934

Personal details
- Died: between 939 and 943
- Denomination: Christian

Alfred was a medieval Bishop of Sherborne.

Alfred was consecrated between 932 and 934. He died between 939 and 943.

== Citations ==
Christian titles
Preceded by Sigehelm	Bishop of Sherborne c. 933-c. 941	Succeeded by Wulfsige II
