= Robert Wickhampton =

13th-century Bishop of Salisbury

- Bishop of Salisbury
- Elected: c. 6 March 1271
- Term ended: 24 April 1284
- Predecessor: Walter de la Wyle
- Successor: Walter Scammel
- Other post: Dean of Salisbury

Orders
- Consecration: 13 May 1274 by Archbishop Robert Kilwardby, O.P. with co-consecrator Bishop Laurence of Saint Martin

Personal details
- Died: 24 April 1284
- Denomination: Roman Catholic

Robert Wickhampton was a medieval Bishop of Salisbury.

Wickhampton was a canon of Salisbury before he was Dean of Salisbury by 17 January 1258. He was also a papal chaplain. He had a dispensation for his election to the bishopric due to his illegitimacy. He was elected to the see of Salisbury about 23 February 1271 and consecrated on 13 May 1274. He died on 24 April 1284. Before his death, he became blind, and a coadjutor was appointed to the see on 12 February 1282. He may have been related to an archdeacon of Salisbury, Thomas de Wickhampton.

== Citations ==
Catholic Church titles
Preceded by Walter de la Wyle	Bishop of Salisbury; 1271–1284	Succeeded by Walter Scammel
