= Robert Wyvil =

14th-century Bishop of Salisbury

- Bishop of Salisbury
- Appointed: 16 April 1330
- Term ended: 4 September 1375
- Predecessor: Roger Martival
- Successor: Ralph Ergham

Orders
- Consecration: 15 July 1330

Personal details
- Died: 4 September 1375
- Denomination: Catholic

Robert Wyvil (or Wyvill or Wyville) was a medieval Bishop of Salisbury.

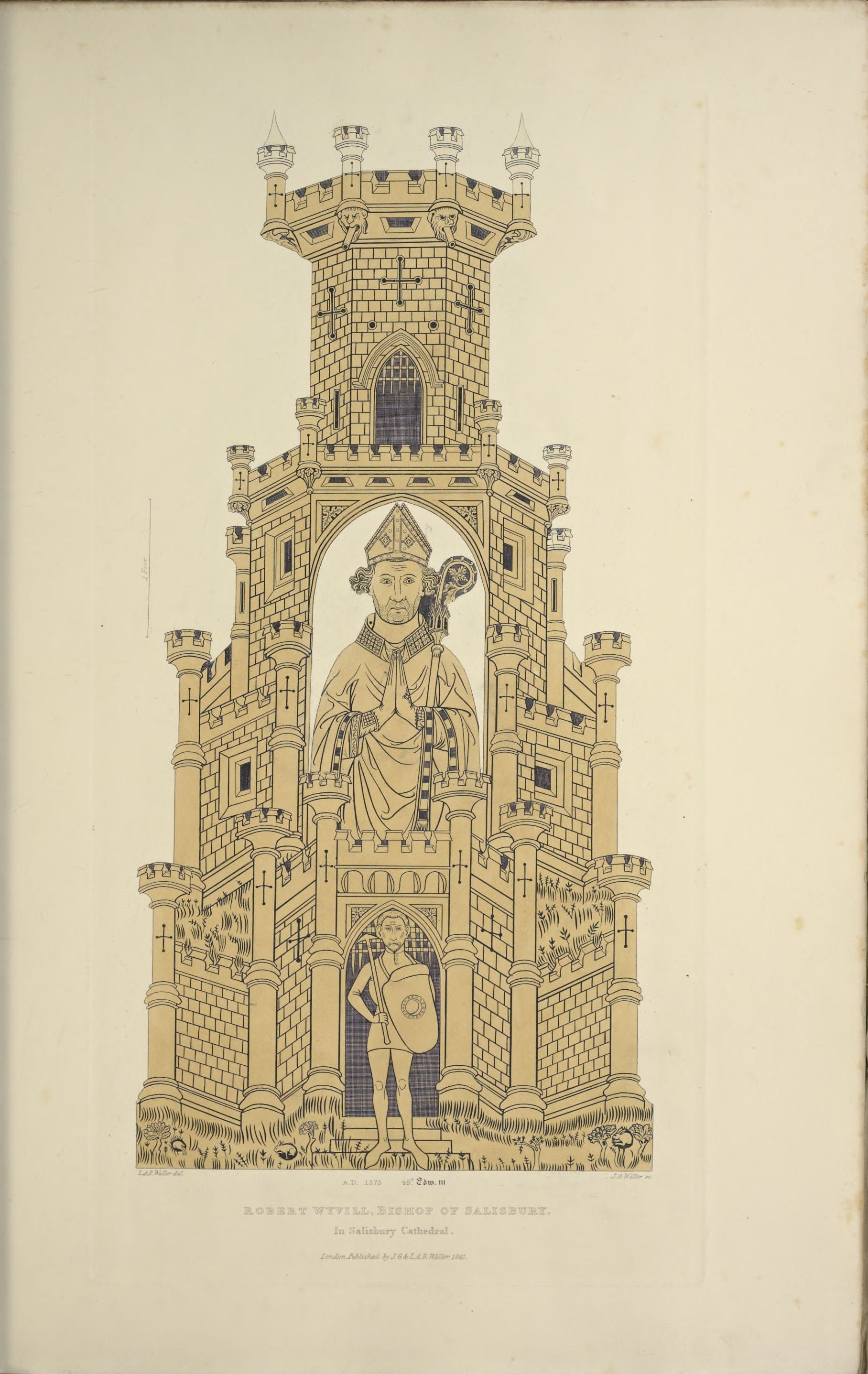
Memorial brass to Robert Wyvill in the cathedral

Wyvil was keeper of the Privy Seal of Edward, duke of Aquitaine in 1326 when he was named on 26 October Lord Privy Seal, which office he held until the early part of 1327.

Wyvil was nominated to the see of Salisbury on 16 April 1330 and consecrated on 15 July 1330. He had a reputation for stressing his authority and defending the rights of his see: Wyvil was the first Salisbury bishop to use 'Sarum' on his seal, issued a mandate against a man impersonating a hermit, and nearly used a knight in a trial by combat to maintain the cathedral's ownership of Sherborne Castle.

He died on 4 September 1375.

== Citations ==
Political offices
Preceded by William Herlaston	Lord Privy Seal; 1326–1327	Succeeded by Richard Airmyn
Catholic Church titles
Preceded by Roger Martival	Bishop of Salisbury; 1330–1375	Succeeded by Ralph Ergham
