= Brithwine II =

11th-century Bishop of Sherborne

- Bishop of Sherborne
- Appointed: 1023
- Term ended: probably 2 June 1045
- Predecessor: Ælfmær
- Successor: Ælfwold II

Orders
- Consecration: 1023

Personal details
- Died: probably 2 June 1045
- Denomination: Christian

Brithwine II (Note: Or Brithwyn or Beorhtwine) was a medieval Bishop of Sherborne.

Brithwine was consecrated in 1023. He died probably on 2 June 1045.

== Citations ==
Christian titles
Preceded by Ælfmær	Bishop of Sherborne; 1023-1045	Succeeded by Ælfwold II
