= Ælfmær (bishop of Sherborne) =

11th-century Bishop of Sherborne

Ælfmaer
- Bishop of Sherborne
- Appointed: 1017
- Term ended: 1023
- Predecessor: Brithwine I
- Successor: Brithwine II

Orders
- Consecration: 1017

Personal details
- Died: 1023
- Denomination: Christian

Ælfmaer was a medieval Bishop of Sherborne.

According to the historian Timothy Bolton, Ælfmaer was an abbot of St Augustine's in Canterbury who was nominated by King Cnut as Bishop of Sherborne in about 1023, but soon afterwards went blind and had to return to St Augustine's, but the Handbook of British Chronology states that Ælfmær was consecrated in 1017 and died in 1023, possibly on 5 April.

== Citations ==
Christian titles
Preceded by Brithwine I	Bishop of Sherborne; 1017–1023	Succeeded by Brithwine II
