= Forthhere =

8th-century Bishop of Sherborne

- Bishop of Sherborne
- Appointed: 709
- Term ended: c. 737
- Predecessor: Aldhelm
- Successor: Herewald

Orders
- Consecration: 709

Personal details
- Died: c. 737
- Denomination: Christian

Forthhere (or Fordhere) was a medieval Bishop of Sherborne.

Forthhere was consecrated in 709. He died about 737, possibly resigning before he died.

The Anglo-Saxon Chronicle for the year 737 reports that he undertook a pilgrimage to Rome along with Queen Frithugyth.

== Citations ==
Christian titles
Preceded by Aldhelm	Bishop of Sherborne; 709–c. 737	Succeeded by Herewald
