= William de York =

13th-century Bishop of Salisbury

- Bishop of Salisbury
- Elected: 10 December 1246
- Term ended: January 1256
- Predecessor: Robert de Bingham
- Successor: Giles of Bridport
- Other post: Provost of Beverley Minster

Orders
- Consecration: 14 July 1247

Personal details
- Died: January 1256
- Denomination: Catholic

William de York was a medieval Bishop of Salisbury.

William was provost of Beverley as well as holding prebends in the dioceses of Lincoln, London, and York. He was also a royal justice. He was elected on 8 or 10 December 1246 and consecrated on 7 or 14 July 1247. He died on either 25 January or 31 January in 1256.

== Citations ==
Catholic Church titles
Preceded by Robert de Bingham	Bishop of Salisbury; 1246–1256	Succeeded by Giles of Bridport
