= Sigehelm =

10th-century Bishop of Sherborne

- Bishop of Sherborne
- Appointed: either around 909 or between 918 and 925
- Term ended: between 932 and 934
- Predecessor: Æthelbald
- Successor: Alfred

Orders
- Consecration: either around 909 or between 918 and 925

Personal details
- Died: between 932 and 934
- Denomination: Christian

Sigehelm (Note: Latin: Sigelmus or Sigehelmus (and other minor variations)) was an Anglo-Saxon medieval Bishop of Sherborne.

Sigehelm was consecrated either around 909 or between 918 and 925. He died between 932 and 934.

== Embassy to India ==
According to the Anglo-Saxon Chronicle, in the year 883, King Alfred sent Sigehelm to India to the shrines of St Thomas and St Barthoholew. This made Sigehelm the first recorded Anglo-Saxon to travel to India.

== Citations ==
Christian titles
Preceded by Æthelbald	Bishop of Sherborne c. 922–933	Succeeded by Alfred
