= Lawrence de Awkeburne =

13th-century Bishop of Salisbury-elect

- Bishop of Salisbury-elect
- Elected: 10 May 1288
- Term ended: 8 August 1288
- Predecessor: Henry Brandeston
- Successor: William de la Corner
- Other post: Prebendary of Ruscombe

Orders
- Consecration: died before consecration

Personal details
- Died: 8 August 1288 Canterbury
- Denomination: Catholic

Lawrence de Awkeburne (or Laurence de Hakeburne) was a medieval Bishop of Salisbury elect.

Awkeburne held the prebend of Ruscombe in the diocese of Salisbury before being elected bishop on 10 May 1288, but he died at Canterbury on 8 August 1288 before he could be consecrated.

== Citations ==
Catholic Church titles
Preceded by Henry Brandeston	Bishop of Salisbury died before consecration 1288	Succeeded by William de la Corner
