= Æthelsige II =

11th-century Bishop of Sherborne

Æthelsige
- Bishop of Sherborne
- Appointed: between 1011 and 1012
- Term ended: after 1014
- Predecessor: Æthelric
- Successor: Brithwine I

Orders
- Consecration: between 1011 and 1012

Personal details
- Died: after 1014
- Denomination: Christian

Æthelsige was a medieval Bishop of Sherborne.

Æthelsige was consecrated between 1011 and 1012. He died sometime after 1014.

== Citations ==
Christian titles
Preceded by Æthelric	Bishop of Sherborne c. 1011–after 1014	Succeeded by Brithwine I
