= Æthelheah =

9th-century Bishop of Sherborne

- Bishop of Sherborne
- Appointed: between 871 and 877
- Term ended: between 879 and 889
- Predecessor: Heahmund
- Successor: Wulfsige

Orders
- Consecration: between 871 and 877

Personal details
- Died: between 879 and 889
- Denomination: Christian

Æthelheah was a medieval Bishop of Sherborne.

Æthelheah was consecrated between 867 and 868. He died between 879 and 889.

== Citations ==
Christian titles
Preceded by Heahmund	Bishop of Sherborne c. 874–c. 875	Succeeded by Wulfsige
