= Giles of Bridport =

13th-century Bishop of Salisbury

- Bishop of Salisbury
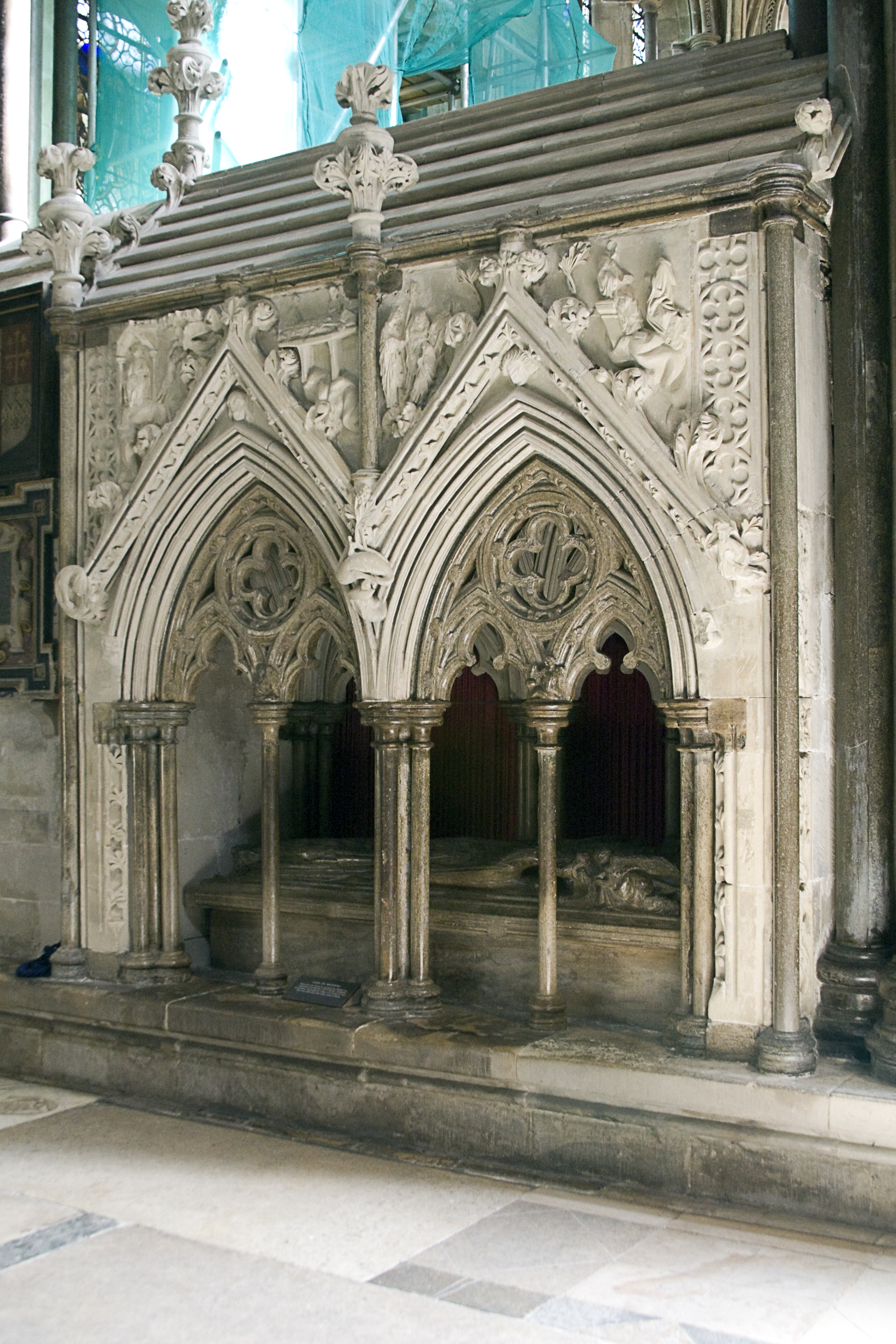
- Giles' tomb in Salisbury Cathedral
- Elected: between 13 February and 15 April 1256
- Term ended: December 1262
- Predecessor: William de York
- Successor: Walter de la Wyle
- Other post: Dean of Wells

Orders
- Consecration: 11 March 1257

Personal details
- Died: December 1262
- Denomination: Catholic

Giles of Bridport was a medieval Bishop of Salisbury.

Giles was archdeacon of Berkshire in the diocese of Salisbury as well as Dean of Wells before he was elected bishop between 13 February and 15 April 1256 and consecrated on 11 March 1257. He died in December 1262, probably on the 13th. He founded the College of the Valley Scholars at Salisbury in 1262 and may have been the brother of Simon of Bridport, who was treasurer of the diocese of Salisbury. He is commemorated by a statue in niche 169 on the west front of Salisbury Cathedral.

== Citations ==
Catholic Church titles
Preceded by William de York	Bishop of Salisbury; 1256–1262	Succeeded by Walter de la Wyle
