= Henry Brandeston =

13th-century Bishop of Salisbury

- Bishop of Salisbury
- Elected: 2 January 1287
- Term ended: 11 February 1288
- Predecessor: Walter Scammel
- Successor: Lawrence de Awkeburne
- Other post: Dean of Salisbury

Orders
- Consecration: 1 June 1287

Personal details
- Died: 11 February 1288
- Denomination: Catholic

Henry Brandeston (or Henry of Braunstone) was a medieval Bishop of Salisbury.

== Life ==
Brandeston held the offices of archdeacon of Wiltshire, archdeacon of Dorset, and Dean of Salisbury, all in the diocese of Salisbury.

Brandeston was elected bishop on 2 January 1287 and consecrated on 1 June 1287. He was enthroned at Salisbury Cathedral on 19 October 1287.

Brandeston died on 11 February 1288.

== Citations ==
Catholic Church titles
Preceded by Walter Scammel	Bishop of Salisbury; 1287–1288	Succeeded by Lawrence de Awkeburne
