= Wærstan =

10th-century Bishop of Sherborne and saint

- Bishop of Sherborne
- Appointed: c. 909
- Term ended: either 918 or between around 909 and 925
- Predecessor: Æthelweard
- Successor: Æthelbald

Orders
- Consecration: c. 909

Personal details
- Died: either 918 or between around 909 and 925
- Denomination: Christian

Wærstan (Note: Or Waerstan or Werstane) was a medieval Bishop of Sherborne, venerated as a saint in the Roman Catholic and Eastern Orthodox churches.

Wærstan was consecrated around 909. He died either in 918 or between around 909 and 925.

== Citations ==
Christian titles
| Preceded by Æthelweard | Bishop of Sherborne c. 914 | Succeeded by Æthelbald |
