= W. H. Stevenson =

English historian and philologist

William Henry Stevenson (7 September 1858 – 22 October 1924), who wrote as W. H. Stevenson, was an English historian and philologist who specialized in Anglo-Saxon England.

Stevenson was born in Nottingham to William Stevenson and Mary Ann Stevenson. He was the eldest of four children, and had a brother and two sisters. Stevenson went to school in Hull. As a young man he was a researcher for the Nottingham Borough Council and became a contributor to the English Historical Review. Having worked for many years on early charters, in May 1898 Stephenson delivered the Sandars Lectures at Cambridge on the subject of 'The Anglo-Saxon Chancery'. Stevenson was elected a research fellow of Exeter College in 1895.

A pioneer of Anglo-Saxon studies, Stevenson's magnum opus was his edition of Asser's Life of King Alfred, published in 1904, and in the sixteen years between 1892 and 1908 he edited for the Public Record Office eleven volumes of calendars of Close Rolls.

A fellow and librarian of St John's College, Oxford, from 1904 until his death, he was the mentor of Frank Stenton.

One of Stevenson's greatest strengths was a faultless knowledge of the important languages of his period.

== A discovery regarding Shakespeare ==
In 1905, while working on records kept at Belvoir Castle, Stevenson discovered evidence that in March 1613 (a few months before the Globe theatre burnt down during a performance of Henry VIII), William Shakespeare and Richard Burbage, who had some skill as a portrait painter, were each paid forty-four shillings in gold for creating and painting the Earl of Rutland’s emblem. This decorative emblem was to be used at a festive tournament later that month at Whitehall in London to mark the accession of King James I ten years earlier.

== Major publications ==
- Calendar of the Records of the Corporation of Gloucester (Gloucester, 1893)
- Calendar of the Close Rolls Preserved in the Public Record Office: Edward II, 1313-1327, 3 volumes (London, 1893-1898); Edward III, 1327-1373, 2 volumes (London, 1896-1898); Edward I, 1272-1307, 5 volumes (London, 1900-1908)
- Records of the Borough of Nottingham: 1625–1702 (1900)
- Asser's Life of King Alfred: together with the Annals of Saint Neots erroneously ascribed to Asser (Oxford 1904)
- A Contemporary Description of the Domesday Survey (1907)
- Early Scholastic Colloquies edited by the late W. H. Stevenson (1929)
- The Early History of St John's College, Oxford, by the late W. H. Stevenson (1939)
- Records of the Borough of Leicester: Being a Series of Extracts from the Archives of the Corporation of Leicester, 1509–1603
