= Wigberht =

9th-century Bishop of Sherborne

- Bishop of Sherborne
- Appointed: between 793 and 801
- Term ended: between 816 and 824
- Predecessor: Denefrith
- Successor: Eahlstan

Orders
- Consecration: between 793 and 801

Personal details
- Died: between 816 and 825
- Denomination: Christian

Wigberht (or Wigbeorht or Wilbert) was a medieval Bishop of Sherborne.

Wigberht was consecrated between 793 and 801. He died between 816 and 825. In 814 he accompanied Archbishop Wulfred of Canterbury to Rome.

== Citations ==
Christian titles
Preceded by Denefrith	Bishop of Sherborne c. 797–c. 820	Succeeded by Eahlstan
