= Æthelbald (bishop) =

10th-century Bishop of Sherborne

- Bishop of Sherborne
- Appointed: either around 909 or between 918 and 925
- Term ended: either around 909 or between 918 and 925
- Predecessor: Wærstan
- Successor: Sigehelm

Orders
- Consecration: either around 909 or between 918 and 925

Personal details
- Died: either around 909 or between 918 and 925
- Denomination: Christian

Æthelbald (Note: Or Æthelbeald or Ethelbald) was a medieval Bishop of Sherborne.

Æthelbald was consecrated sometime around 909 or between 918 and 925, and he died within the same uncertain period.

== Citations ==
Christian titles
Preceded by Wærstan	Bishop of Sherborne c. 921	Succeeded by Sigehelm
