= Wulfsige III =

10th-century Bishop of Sherborne

- Bishop of Sherborne
- Appointed: c. 993
- Term ended: 8 January 1002
- Predecessor: Æthelsige I
- Successor: Æthelric

Personal details
- Died: 8 January 1002
- Denomination: Christian

Wulfsige III (or Wulfsin, Wulfinus, Vulsin, Ultius) was a medieval Bishop of Sherborne and is considered a saint.

== Life ==
Wulfsige was nominated about 993. He died on 8 January 1002.

Wulfsige took part in the tenth century Benedictine monastic reform movement in England. He had been a monk of Glastonbury Abbey under Dunstan, became a monk of Westminster Abbey during Dunstan's tenure as Bishop of London, was appointed abbot of Westminster, probably from before 966, when he first occurs. He was appointed to Sherborne by King Edgar the Peaceful, and held the abbacy along with the bishopric of Sherborne until at least 997. It was as bishop of Sherborne that Wulfsige presided over the refoundation of the cathedral community as a Benedictine abbey in 998. In 1998 a one-day conference was held to celebrate the refoundation of the abbey of Sherbone, and a collection of essays, St Wulfsige and Sherborne, was published in 2005.

Wulfsige is considered a saint and Goscelin wrote a hagiography of him, which has been translated by Rosalind Love.

== Monks of Ramsgate account ==
The monks of St Augustine's Abbey, Ramsgate wrote in their Book of Saints (1921),

WULSIN (St.) Bp. (Jan. 8)
(19th cent.) One of the restorers of monastic discipline in the tenth century under St. Dunstan. From being Abbot of Thorney (Westminster) he was promoted to the Bishopric of Sherborne (later transferred to Sarum or Salisbury). He died at Sherborne, A.D. 973.

== Baring-Gould's account ==
Sabine Baring-Gould (1834–1924) in his Lives Of The Saints wrote under January 8,

S. WULSIN, B. OF SHERBOURN.
(A.D. 983.)
[Benedictine Martyrology. In English Martyrologies S. Wulsin was commemorated on Sept. 27th. Mentioned by Matthew of Westminster. His life is given by Capgrave.]

MATTHEW OF WESTMINSTER says (De gestis Pontif. Anglorum, lib. 2):—"Dunstan, the archbishop, when he was Bishop of London, made him (Wulsin), abbot of Westminster, a place where formerly Mellitus had raised a church to S. Peter, and here he formed a monastery of twelve monks. Having discharged his office prudently and with sanctity, he was made Bishop of Sherbourn. Then he at once instituted monks in the episcopal seat, and dismissed the secular clerks, lest he should seem to sleep when so many bishops of the time were patrons of diligence. His sanctity, if manifest in life, was more so in death. For when he was nigh the gates of death, the eyes of his understanding being opened, he exclaimed singing, 'I see the heavens opened, and Jesus standing at the right hand of God !' Which song he uttered without faltering, and singing, he died."

== Butler's account ==
The hagiographer Alban Butler (1710–1773) wrote in his Lives of the Fathers, Martyrs, and Other Principal Saints under January 8,

St. Vulsin, Bishop of Shireburn, C. William of Malmesbury informs us, that St. Dunstan, when bishop of London, appointed him abbot of twelve monks at Thorney, since called Westminster, where Saint Mellitus had built a church in honour of St. Peter. Vulsin was afterwards chosen bishop of Shireburn; his holy life was crowned with a happy death in 973. He is called Ultius by Matthew of Westminster; but his true ancient name, given by Capgrave, is Vulsin. See Malmesbury de Pontif. Angl. l. 2. Capgrave and Harpsfield, sæc. 10. c. 9. sæc. 11. c. 16.

== Sources ==
- Baring-Gould, Sabine (1897), The Lives Of The Saints, vol. 1, January, London: J. C. Nimmo This article incorporates text from this source, which is in the public domain.
- Barker, Katherine; Hinton, David; Hunt, Alan (2005). St Wulfsige and Sherborne. Oxford: Oxbow Books.
- Butler, Alban (1798), The Lives of the Primitive Fathers, Martyrs, and Other Principal Saints, vol. 1, J. Moir This article incorporates text from this source, which is in the public domain.
- Fryde, E. B.; Greenway, D. E.; Porter, S.; Roy, I. (1996). Handbook of British Chronology (Third Edition, revised ed.). Cambridge: Cambridge University Press. ISBN 0-521-56350-X.
- Knowles, David; London, Vera C. M.; Brooke, Christopher (2001). The Heads of Religious Houses, England and Wales, 940–1216 (Second ed.). Cambridge: Cambridge University Press. ISBN 0-521-80452-3.
- Love, Rosalind (2005). "The Life of St Wulfsige of Sherborne by Goscelin of Saint-Bertin: a New Translation with introduction, appendix and notes". In Barker, Katherine; Hinton, David; Hunt, Alan (eds.). St Wulfsige and Sherborne. Oxford, UK: Oxbow Books. pp. 98–123. ISBN 978-1-84217-175-2.
- St. Augustine's Abbey, Ramsgate (1921), The Book of saints : a dictionary of servants of God canonized by the Catholic Church, London: A. & C. Black, ltd. This article incorporates text from this source, which is in the public domain.

Christian titles
Preceded by Æthelsige I	Bishop of Sherborne c. 993–1002	Succeeded by Æthelric
