= Æthelsige I =

10th-century Bishop of Sherborne

Æthelsige
- Bishop of Sherborne
- Appointed: between 978 and 979
- Term ended: between 991 and 993
- Predecessor: Ælfwold I
- Successor: Wulfsige III

Orders
- Consecration: between 978 and 979

Personal details
- Died: between 991 and 993
- Denomination: Christian

Æthelsige (or Æthelsige I) was a medieval Bishop of Sherborne.

Æthelsige was consecrated between 978 and 979. He died between 991 and 993.

== Citations ==
Christian titles
Preceded by Ælfwold I	Bishop of Sherborne c. 978–c. 992	Succeeded by Wulfsige III
