= Wulfsige II =

10th-century Bishop of Sherborne

Wulfsige
- Bishop of Sherborne
- Appointed: between 939 and 943
- Term ended: after 958 to around 963
- Predecessor: Alfred
- Successor: Ælfwold I

Orders
- Consecration: between 939 and 943

Personal details
- Died: after 958 to around 963
- Denomination: Christian

Wulfsige (or Wulfsige II) was a medieval Bishop of Sherborne.

Wulfsige was consecrated between 939 and 943. He died after 958 to sometime around 963.

== Citations ==
Christian titles
Preceded by Alfred	Bishop of Sherborne c. 941-c. 962	Succeeded by Ælfwold I
