= Wulfsige I =

9th-century Bishop of Sherborne

Wulfsige
- Bishop of Sherborne
- Appointed: between 879 and 889
- Term ended: from between 890 and 896 to 900
- Predecessor: Æthelheah
- Successor: Asser

Orders
- Consecration: between 879 and 889

Personal details
- Died: from between 890 and 896 to 900
- Denomination: Christian

Wulfsige was a ninth-century Bishop of Sherborne.

== Dates ==
The exact dates of Wulfsige's bishopric and of his demise are uncertain. The editors of The Handbook of British Chronology have placed his date of accession between 879 and 889 and his death between 890 and 896 with a terminal end date of 900. This date is confirmed by the fact that Asser, Wulfsige's successor, was signing charters as bishop of Sherborne in 900. However, it has recently been suggested that Wulfsige of Sherborne might have been the same Wulfsige who succeeded Heahstan as bishop of London around 900, making 900 the approximate year of Wulfsige's transfer rather than his death.

== Educational reform under Alfred the Great ==
Wulfsige was a contemporary of King Alfred the Great, who had undertaken an effort of educational reform in his realm, personally translating into English what he considered the works “most necessary for all men to know.” When Alfred translated the Pastorale of Pope Gregory the Great, he sent a copy to each of his bishops, including Wulfsige, and added a prefatory letter explaining his educational aims and requesting the bishops to educate young men so that they could read these great works, originally composed in Latin. The copy sent to Wulfsige, which includes his name in the preface, survives as MS Ii.2.4 at Cambridge University Library. It is one of only five which are extant today and was the original from which copies were made in the eleventh century.

When Werferth, bishop of Worcester, translated Gregory's Dialogues into English, Alfred sent an exemplar to Wulfsige, who composed a poem that was included as a preface to the work. In this preface, Wulfsige asked his readers to pray for him and for King Alfred, whom he referred to as the "greatest treasure-giver of all time."

== Citations ==
Christian titles
Preceded by Æthelheah	Bishop of Sherborne c. 885–c. 896	Succeeded by Asser
