= Robert de Bingham =

13th-century Bishop of Salisbury

- Bishop of Salisbury
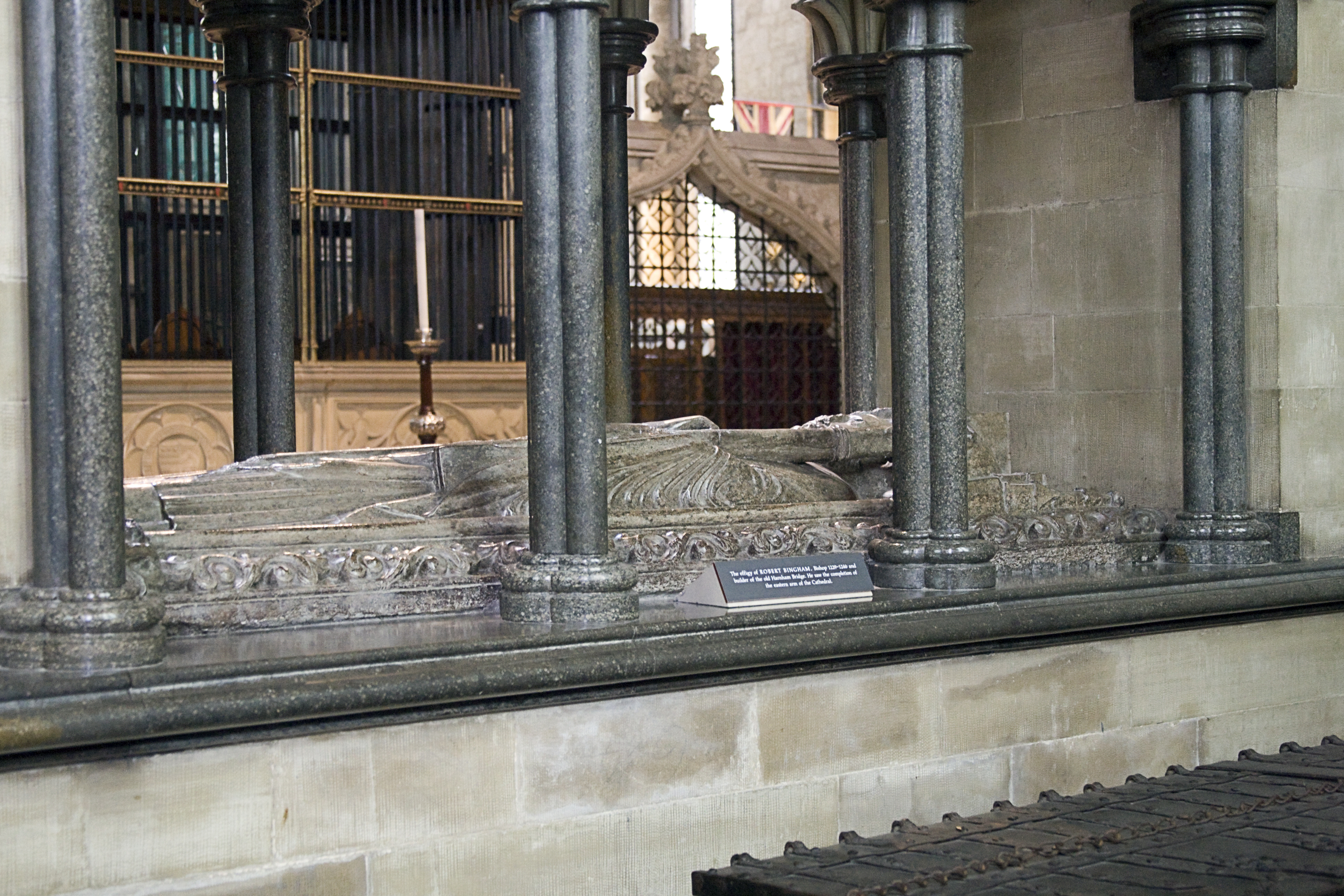
- Bingham's tomb in Salisbury Cathedral
- Elected: c. 25 September 1228
- Term ended: December 1246
- Predecessor: Richard Poore
- Successor: William de York
- Other post: Prebendary of Slape

Orders
- Consecration: 27 May 1229

Personal details
- Born: 1180
- Died: 2 November or 3 November 1246
- Denomination: Catholic

Robert de Bingham (1180–1246) was the Bishop of Salisbury from 1229 to 1246.

Bingham held the prebend of Slape in the diocese of Salisbury prior to his election as bishop about 25 September 1228 and was consecrated at Wilton on 27 May 1229.

Bingham died on 2 December or 3 November 1246.

== Citations ==
Catholic Church titles
Preceded by Richard Poore	Bishop of Salisbury; 1229–1246	Succeeded by William de York
