= Brithwine I =

11th-century Bishop of Sherborne

- Bishop of Sherborne
- Appointed: between 1014 and 1017
- Term ended: between 1014 and 1017
- Predecessor: Æthelsige II
- Successor: Ælfmær

Orders
- Consecration: between 1014 and 1017

Personal details
- Died: between 1014 and 1017
- Denomination: Christian

Brithwine I (Note: Or Brithwyn or Beorhtwine) was a medieval Bishop of Sherborne.

Brithwine was consecrated between 1014 and 1017. He died between 1014 and 1017.

== Citations ==
Christian titles
Preceded by Æthelsige II	Bishop of Sherborne c. 1015–c. 1016	Succeeded by Ælfmær
