= Walter Scammel =

13th-century Bishop of Salisbury

- Bishop of Salisbury
- Elected: 26 June 1284
- Term ended: September 1286
- Predecessor: Robert Wickhampton
- Successor: Henry Brandeston
- Other post: Dean of Salisbury

Orders
- Consecration: 22 October 1284

Personal details
- Died: September 1286
- Denomination: Catholic

Walter Scammel was a medieval Bishop of Salisbury.

Scammel was archdeacon of Berkshire in the diocese of Salisbury, treasurer of that diocese, and finally Dean of Salisbury. He was elected to the deanery on 9 September 1271.

Scammel was elected bishop on 26 June 1284 and consecrated on 22 October 1284. He was enthroned at Salisbury Cathedral on 4 January 1285. He died between 20 September and 25 September 1286.

== Citations ==
Catholic Church titles
Preceded by Robert Wickhampton	Bishop of Salisbury; 1284–1286	Succeeded by Henry Brandeston
