= Bishop of Salisbury =

English bishop

- Bishopric

anglican
- Incumbent; Stephen Lake

Location
- Ecclesiastical province: Canterbury
- Residence: South Canonry, Salisbury

Information
- First holder: Aldhelm; Herman (first bishop at Sarum)
- Established: 709; 1075 (translated to Salisbury)
- Diocese: Salisbury
- Cathedral: Salisbury Cathedral

The Bishop of Salisbury is the ordinary of the Church of England's Diocese of Salisbury in the Province of Canterbury. The diocese covers much of the counties of Wiltshire and Dorset. The see is in the City of Salisbury where the bishop's seat is in the Cathedral Church of the Blessed Virgin Mary.

The current bishop is Stephen Lake. He stepped back voluntarily in April 2026 following allegations of financial irregularities; Karen Gorham is the acting diocesan bishop.

== History ==
The English dioceses 950–1035

The Diocese of Sherborne (founded c. AD 705) was the origin of the present diocese; St Aldhelm was its first bishop.

In about 705 the vast diocese of Wessex at Winchester was divided in two with the creation of a new diocese of Sherborne under Bishop Aldhelm, covering Devon, Somerset and Dorset. Cornwall was added to the diocese at the end of the ninth century, but in about 909 the diocese was divided in three with the creation of the bishoprics of Wells, covering Somerset, and Crediton, covering Devon and Cornwall, leaving Sherborne with Dorset.

In 1058, the Sherborne chapter elected Herman, Bishop of Ramsbury to be also Bishop of Sherborne. Following the Norman Conquest, the 1075 Council of London united his two sees as a single diocese and translated them to the then-larger settlement around the royal castle at Old Sarum. Disputes between Bishops Herbert and Richard Poore and the sheriffs of Wiltshire led to the removal of the see in the 1220s to New Sarum (modern Salisbury). This was chartered as the city of New Sarum by King Henry III in 1227, but it was not until the 14th century that the office was described (by Bishop Wyvil) as the bishop of Sarum (episcopus Sarum). The diocese, like the city, is now known as Salisbury. The archdeaconry around Salisbury, however, retains the name of Sarum.

Reforms within the Church of England led to the annexation of Dorset from the abolished diocese of Bristol in 1836; Berkshire, however, was removed the same year and given to Oxford. In 1925 and 1974, new suffragan bishops were appointed to assist the Bishop of Salisbury; the new offices were titled the bishops of Sherborne and Ramsbury, respectively. Until 2009 the bishops operated under an episcopal area scheme established in 1981, with each suffragan bishop having a formal geographical area of responsibility, and being known as "area bishops": the Bishop of Ramsbury had oversight of the diocese's parishes in Wiltshire, while the Bishop of Sherborne had oversight of the parishes in Dorset. This scheme was replaced to reflect the increased working across the whole diocese by all three bishops. The two suffragans may now legally function anywhere in the diocese, and the Bishop of Salisbury may delegate any of his functions to them. The Bishop of Salisbury's residence is now the South Canonry, near the cathedral.

== List of bishops ==
=== Anglo-Saxon ===
Bishops of Sherborne
From	Until	Incumbent	Notes
c. 705	709	Saint Aldhelm	Also Abbot of Malmesbury.
709	737?	Forthhere	Also recorded as Fordhere. Possibly resigned the see in 737.
736	766 x 774	Herewald	
766 x 774	789 x 794	Æthelmod	
793	796 x 801	Denefrith	
793 x 801	816 x 825	Wigberht	Also recorded as Wigheorht.
816 x 825	867	Eahlstan	Also recorded as Alfstan.
867 or 868	871	Saint Heahmund	Also recorded as Saint Hamund.
871 x 877	879 x 889	Æthelheah	
879 x 889	890 x 900	Wulfsige I	
890 x 900	909	Asser	Also recorded as John Asser or Asserius Menevensis.
c. 909	c. 909	Æthelweard	
c. 909	918, or 909 x 925	Wærstan	
918, or 909 x 925	918, or 909 x 925	Æthelbald	
918, or 909 x 925	932 x 934	Sigehelm	
932 x 934	939 x 943	Alfred	
939 x 943	958 x 964	Wulfsige II	
958 x 964	978	Ælfwold I	
978 or 979	991 x 993	Æthelsige I	
993?	1002	Wulfsige III	Died in office on 8 January 1002.
1002	1011 or 1012	Æthelric	
1011 or 1012	c. 1014	Æthelsige II	
1014 x 1017	1014 x 1017	Brithwine I	
1017	1023	Ælfmær	Abbot of St Augustine's Abbey, Canterbury. Died in office, possibly on 5 April 1023.
1023	1045	Brithwine II	Died in office, possibly on 2 June 1045.
1045	1058	Saint Ælfwold II	Venerated as a saint with his Feast day on 25 March.
1058	1075	Herman	Also Bishop of Ramsbury. Became the first Bishop of Salisbury when the sees of Sherborne and Ramsbury were transferred to Salisbury (Old Sarum) in 1075.

=== Pre-Reformation ===
Bishops of Salisbury
From	Until	Incumbent	Notes
See at Old Sarum
1075	1078	Herman	Bishop of Sherborne (1058–75) and of Ramsbury (1045–55 and 1058–75). Removed the two sees to Salisbury (Old Sarum) in 1075. Died in office.
1078	1099	Saint Osmund	Died in office. Canonized by Pope Callixtus III in 1457.
1099	1102	See vacant	
1102	1139	Roger of Salisbury	Formerly Lord Chancellor. Died in office.
1140		Henry de Sully	Nominated by Henry of Blois, but was rejected by King Stephen. In compensation, Sully became abbot of Fécamp Abbey.
1140	1141	Philip de Harcourt	Dean of Lincoln. Nominated by King Stephen, but Henry of Blois refused to consecrate. Harcourt appealed to Rome, but the nomination was quashed. Later became Bishop of Bayeux.
1142	1184	Josceline de Bohon	Also recorded as Jocelin Bohon. Formerly Archdeacon of Winchester. Resigned in 1184 and became a Cistercian monk at Forde Abbey, Dorset.
1184	1189	See vacant	
1189	1193	Hubert Walter	Formerly Dean of York. Translated to Canterbury
1194	1217	Herbert Poore	Formerly Archdeacon of Canterbury. Translated to Canterbury.
1217	1225	Richard Poore	Previously Dean of Salisbury (1197–1215) and translated from Chichester. Removed see to Salisbury.
See at Salisbury
1225	1228	Richard Poore (cont.)	Removed the see from Old Sarum. Translated to Durham.
1229	1246	Robert de Bingham	Also recorded as Robert Bingham. Died in office.
1246	1256	William de York	Formerly Provost of Beverley. Died in office.
1256	1262	Giles of Bridport	Formerly Dean of Wells. Died in office.
1263	1271	Walter de la Wyle	Formerly Sub-chanter of Salisbury. Died in office.
1271	1284	Robert Wickhampton	Formerly Dean of Salisbury. Died in office.
1284	1286	Walter Scammel	Formerly Dean of Salisbury. Died in office.
1287	1288	Henry Brandeston	Formerly Dean of Salisbury. Died in office.
1288		Lawrence de Awkeburne	Elected but died before consecration.
1288	1291	William de la Corner	Formerly Archdeacon of Northumberland. Died in office.
1291	1297	Nicholas Longespee	Formerly a Prebendary of Salisbury. Died in office.
1297	1315	Simon of Ghent	Died in office.
1315	1330	Roger Martival	Formerly Dean of Lincoln. Died in office.
1330	1375	Robert Wyvil	Also recorded as Robert Wyville. Died in office.
1375	1388	Ralph Ergham	Translated to Bath & Wells.
1388	1395	John Waltham	Also Master of the Rolls and Lord Treasurer. Died in office.
1395	1407	Richard Mitford	Translated from Chichester. Died in office.
1407		Nicholas Bubwith	Also recorded as Nicholas Bubbewith. Translated from London. Afterwards translated to Bath & Wells.
1407	1417	Robert Hallam	Formerly Archdeacon of Canterbury and Chancellor of Oxford. Created a pseudocardinal by Antipope John XXIII in 1411, but Hallam did not accept the promotion. Died in office.
1417	1426	John Chandler	Also recorded as John Chaundler. Formerly Dean of Salisbury. Died in office.
1427	1438	Robert Neville	Also recorded as Robert Nevill. Formerly Provost of Beverley. Translated to Durham.
1438	1450	William Ayscough	Also recorded as William Aiscough. Murdered by an angry mob during Jack Cade's rebellion.
1450	1481	Richard Beauchamp	Translated from Hereford. Died in office.
1482	1484	Lionel Woodville	Formerly Dean of Exeter and Chancellor of Oxford. Died in office.
1485	1493	Thomas Langton	Translated from St David's. Afterwards translated to Winchester.
1493	1499	John Blyth	Also recorded as John Blythe. Also Master of the Rolls and Chancellor of Cambridge. Died in office.
1501		Henry Deane	Translated from Bangor. Afterwards translated to Canterbury
1502	1524	Edmund Audley	Translated from Hereford. Died in office.
1524	1534	Lorenzo Campeggio	Bishop of Bologna. Appointed Administrator of Salisbury. Deprived by Act of Parliament on the grounds of non-residence. Continued to be recognized as Administrator by the Vatican until July 1539.

=== During the Reformation ===
Bishops of Salisbury
From	Until	Incumbent	Notes
1535	1539	Nicholas Shaxton	Formerly Treasurer of Salisbury. Resigned due to non-subscription to the Six Articles.
1539	1557	John Capon	Also known as John Salcott. Translated from Bangor. Died in office.
1539	1542	Gasparo Contarini	Bishop of Belluno. Appointed apostolic administrator of Salisbury by Pope Paul III, but was not recognised by King Henry VIII.
1543	1553	William Petow	Appointed by Pope Paul III, but was not recognised by King Henry VIII. Did not take possession on the accession of Queen Mary I in 1553.
1558		Francis Mallet	Dean of Lincoln (1555–1570). Nominated by Queen Mary but not consecrated, and set aside on her death.

=== Post-Reformation ===
Bishops of Salisbury
From	Until	Incumbent	Notes
1559	1571	John Jewel	Died in office.
1571	1577	Edmund Gheast	Translated from Rochester. Also Lord High Almoner. Died in office.
1577	1589	John Piers	Translated from Rochester. Also Lord High Almoner. Afterwards translated to York
1589	1591	See vacant	
1591	1596	John Coldwell	Formerly Dean of Rochester. Died in office.
1596	1598	See vacant	
1598	1615	Henry Cotton	Formerly a Prebendary of Winchester. Died in office.
1615	1618	Robert Abbot	Formerly Master of Balliol College, Oxford. Died in office.
1618	1620	Martin Fotherby	Formerly a Prebendary of Canterbury. Died in office.
1620	1621	Robert Tounson	Also recorded as Robert Townson, Toulson, or Thompson. Formerly Dean of Westminster. Died in office.
1621	1641	John Davenant	Formerly President of Queens' College, Cambridge. Died in office.
1641	1646	Brian Duppa	Translated from Chichester. Deprived of the see when the episcopacy was abolished by Parliament.
1646	1660	See abolished during the Commonwealth and the Protectorate.	
1660		Brian Duppa (restored)	Reinstated on the restoration of the episcopacy. Afterwards translated to Winchester.
1660	1663	Humphrey Henchman	Formerly Precentor of Salisbury. Translated to London.
1663	1665	John Earle	Translated from Worcester. Died in office.
1665	1667	Alexander Hyde	Formerly Dean of Winchester. Died in office.
1667	1689	Seth Ward	Translated from Exeter. Died in office.
1689	1715	Gilbert Burnet	Formerly Preacher at the Rolls Chapel. Died in office.
1715	1721	William Talbot	Translated from Oxford. Afterwards translated to Durham.
1721	1723	Richard Willis	Translated from Gloucester. Afterwards translated to Winchester.
1723	1734	Benjamin Hoadly	Translated from Hereford. Afterwards translated to Winchester.
1734	1748	Thomas Sherlock	Translated from Bangor. Afterwards translated to London.
1748	1757	John Gilbert	Translated from Llandaff. Afterwards translated to York.
1757	1761	John Thomas (I.)	Translated from Peterborough. Afterwards translated to Winchester
1761		Robert Hay Drummond	Translated from St Asaph. Afterwards translated to York.
1761	1766	John Thomas (II.)	Translated from Lincoln. Died in office.
1766	1782	John Hume	Translated from Oxford. Died in office.
1782	1791	Shute Barrington	Translated from Llandaff. Afterwards translated to Durham.
1791	1807	John Douglas	Translated from Carlisle. Died in office
1807	1825	John Fisher	Translated from Exeter. Died in office.
1825	1837	Thomas Burgess	Translated from St David's. Died in office.
1837	1854	Edward Denison	Fellow of Merton College, Oxford. Died in office.
1854	1869	Walter Kerr Hamilton	Formerly a Canon-resident and Precentor of Salisbury. Died in office.
1869	1885	George Moberly	Formerly a Canon of Chester. Died in office.
1885	1911	John Wordsworth	Oriel Professor of Divinity, Oxford. Founder of Bishop Wordsworth's School. Died in office.
1911	1921	Frederick Ridgeway	Translated from Kensington. Died in office.
1921	1935	St Clair Donaldson	Translated from Brisbane. Died in office.
1936	1946	Neville Lovett	Translated from Portsmouth. Retired.
1946	1948	Geoffrey Lunt	Translated from Ripon. Died in office.
1949	1962	William Anderson	Translated from Portsmouth. Retired.
1963	1972	Joseph Fison	Died in office.
1973	1981	George Reindorp	Translated from Guildford. Retired.
1982	1993	John Baker	Retired.
1993	2010	David Stancliffe	Retired.
2011	2021	Nicholas Holtam	Nominated on 12 April, consecrated on 22 July, and installed on 15 October 2011. Retired 3 July 2021.
2021	2022	Karen Gorham, Bishop of Sherborne	Acting diocesan bishop in vacancy.
2022	current	Stephen Lake	Consecrated 25 April 2022.

== Assistant bishops ==
Among those who have served the diocese as assistant bishops have been:

- in 1928: Albert Joscelyne, Vicar of St Mark's, Salisbury (1913–1919), of Chardstock (1919–1930), of Preston (1930–1937), Archdeacon of Sherborne (1919–1941) and former Bishop Coadjutor of Jamaica (1905–1913)

== Bibliography ==
- Fryde, E. B.; Greenway, D. E.; Porter, S.; Roy, I., eds. (1986). Handbook of British Chronology (3rd, reprinted 2003 ed.). Cambridge: Cambridge University Press. ISBN 978-0-521-56350-5.
