= Helge (Danish king) =

King of the Danes
- Reign: 890s
- Predecessor: Sigfred and Halfdan
- Successor: Olof the Brash
- Born: 9th century Denmark
- Died: c. 900; Denmark?
- Spouse: allegedly Aslaug the Younger(legendary)
- Issue: allegedly Sigurd Hart (legendary)
- Dynasty: Dagling (legendary)
- Father: allegedly Olaf Ingjaldsson (legendary)
- Religion: Norse paganism

Helge was a Danish king who ruled at the end of the 9th century. There is no contemporary evidence for his existence, since he is only mentioned in a source from the 11th century.

== Adam of Bremen's account ==
Danish Viking armies in the Frankish kingdoms suffered a series of defeats in the late 9th century, culminating with the Battle of Leuven (891). In the last-mentioned confrontation the Vikings, according to the Annales Fuldenses were killed or drowned in the hundreds or thousands, and the Danish kings Sigfred and Gudfred were among the slain. It has been guessed that Sigfred is identical with a king in the Danish homeland mentioned in 873. According to the ecclesiastic chronicle of Adam of Bremen (c. 1075), a certain king Helge ruled in Denmark after the defeat of the Norsemen. He was beloved by his people on account of his sense of justice and sanctity. Helge's reign ended abruptly when a conqueror called Olof came down from the land of the Swedes. Olof subdued the Danish kingdom with the arms, after which his dynasty ruled for three generations. What happened to Helge we are not told. Adam claims the Danish King Sven Estridsen as his informant; on the request of Adam, the king enumerated his forefathers.

== Later accounts ==
High medieval Norse tradition took up elements of Adam's account and blended them with Scandinavian saga characters. According to the Tale of Ragnar's sons, one of the kings killed in 891 was a son of the Viking ruler Ragnar Lodbrok, Sigurd Snake-in-the-Eye, thus Sigfred of the older sources. His companion Gudfred is identified as Gudrød Olafsson of the Dagling Dynasty of Ringerike in Norway. "Helge the Sharp was the name of Gudrød’s brother. He escaped from the battle with the standard of Sigurd Snake-in-the-Eye, and his sword and shield. He went home to Denmark with his own forces and there found Aslaug, Sigurd’s mother, and told her the tidings." Since Sigurd's son Hardeknud I was still young, Helge stayed with Aslaug and acted as protector-ruler in Denmark, thus performing the same role as the legendary hero Beowulf in the Geatic court. Later on he married Hardeknud's twin sister Aslaug the Younger and sired a son, Sigurd Hart. Sigurd was a contemporary of the next Danish ruler Gorm the Old and acquired the kingdom of Ringerike. He was the maternal grandfather of Harald Fairhair.

== See also ==
- Helgi the Sharp (Ringerike)
- Viking Age Denmark

Legendary titles
Preceded by Sigfred and Halfdan	King of Denmark	Succeeded by Olof the Brash
