= Ragnhild Sigurdsdotter =

Daughter of Sigurd Hart, King of Ringerike in Norway

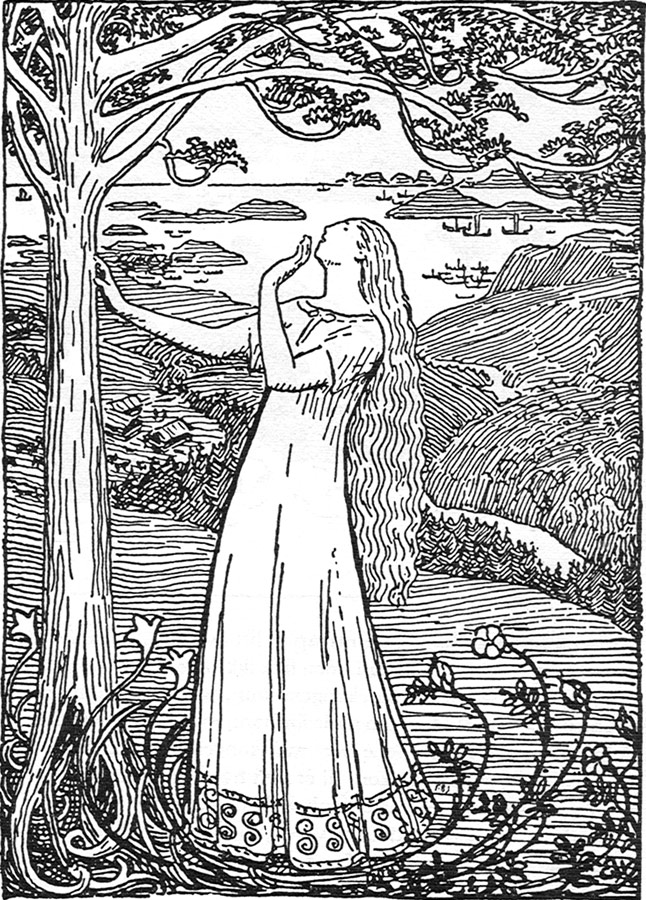

The name Ragnhild Sigurdsdotter may refer to two different figures from Old Norse literature, an amalgam of them, or a purely fictitious figure.

- The wife of Halfdan the Black (c. 810 – c. 860)
- A woman who lived during the late 9th and/or early 10th centuries, who was the daughter of Sigurd Hart of the Dagling clan.

While some traditional accounts portray these two figures as the same woman, they (and their relatives) lived in differing periods.

Some accounts describe her as the daughter of Sigurd Snake-in-the-Eye and others as his granddaughter.

== Ragnhild, wife of Halfdan the Black ==
Heimskringla presents two differing accounts of Halfdan marrying a woman named Ragnhild. The first is a Ragnhild Haraldsdotter, the daughter of a petty king known as Harald Goldbeard of Sogn. The couple is said to have had a son called Harald, named after his grandfather in accordance with naming customs of the time. After Harald Goldbeard, Ragnhild and little Harald died in quick succession the rulership of Sogn was passed to king Halfdan and Atli the Slender was named jarl.

Heimskringla then tells of Sigurd Hart, a great hero who had two children: a daughter named Ragnhild and a son called Guthorm. Haki, a berserker encountered her father in Hadeland and killed him, before kidnapping Ragnhild and Guthorm. Soon afterwards, Ragnhild and Guthorm were kidnapped by Halfdan the Black's sorcerer Horik Wand, so that Halfdan could marry Ragnhild. Fagrskinna does not mention any of these details. However, both sagas agree that Ragnhild and Halfdan the Black were the parents of Harald Fairhair.

== Ragnhild, daughter of Sigurd Hart ==
According to the Ragnarssona þáttr, Ragnhild Sigurdsdotter, daughter of Sigurd Hart and his wife Ingeborg ("Ingibjorg") was the granddaughter of Helgi the Sharp and Aslaug. Her maternal grandfather was Harald Klak. The identity of her maternal grandmother is not mentioned. The Heimskringla changes the name of Harald Klak's daughter but the given lineage remains the same. "Ragnhild's mother was Thorny, a daughter of Klakharald king in Jutland, and a sister of Thrye Dannebod who was married to the Danish king, Gorm the Old, who then ruled over the Danish dominions." Some sources describe Aslaug as a twin sister of Harthacnut of Denmark. The Ragnarssona þáttr, Fagrskinna, and Heimskringla suggest that Ragnhild was a daughter or even granddaughter of Sigurd Snake-in-the-Eye, unless there was more than one man by that name. That is, most sources suggest that Sigurd Snake-in-the-Eye was active only in the late 9th century, which would mean that he was either about the same age as Ragnhild or younger.

== Traditional accounts ==
Ragnarssona þáttr

According to the Ragnarssona þáttr, "Sigurd Hart. Of all the men ever seen, he was the fairest, and the biggest, and the strongest. They were the same age, Gorm Knutsson and Sigurd Hart. When Sigurd was twelve, he killed the berserk Hildibrand in a duel, and he single-handedly slew twelve men in that fight. After that Klakk-Harald gave him his daughter, who was called Ingibjorg. They had two children: Gudthorm and Ragnhild."

"Then Sigurd learnt that King Frodi, his father's brother, was dead. He went north to Norway and became king over Ringerike, his inheritance. There is a long story told of him, as he did all manner of mighty deeds. But it's said of his passing, that he rode out hunting in the wilderness, as was his custom, and Haki Hadaberserk came at him with thirty fully armed men and they fought with him." The name of his opponent means "Haki, berserker from Hadeland." Nothing else is mentioned of his past. "Sigurd fell there, after first killing twelve men, but King Haki had lost his right hand and received three other wounds besides. Afterwards Haki and his men rode to Ringerike, to Stein, where Sigurd's dwelling was, and took away Ragnhild his daughter, and his son Gudthorm, and plenty of goods too, and carried them off home with him to Hadeland. And soon after that, he had a great feast prepared and meant to celebrate his wedding, but it was put off because his wounds weren't healing. Ragnhild was fifteen years old then, and Gudthorm fourteen. Autumn passed, and Haki was laid up with his wounds till Yule."

"At this time, King Halfdan the Black was staying at his estate in Hedmark. He sent Harek Gand with a hundred and twenty men, and they marched over the frozen Lake Mjøsa to Hadeland one night and came the next morning to King Haki's home and seized all the doors of the hall where the retainers were sleeping. And then they went to King Haki's bedroom and took Ragnhild and Gudthorm, her brother, and all the treasure that was there, and carry it off with them. They burnt all the retainers in their hall and then leave. But King Haki got up and got dressed and went after them for a while. But when he came to the ice, he turned down his sword-hilt to the ground and fell on the point and met his death there, and he's buried on the bank of the lake."

"King Halfdan saw them coming over the ice with a covered wagon and guessed their mission had gone exactly as he wished. He had a message sent then to all the settlements and invited to all the important people in Hedmark to a big feast that very day. There he celebrated his wedding to Ragnhild, and they lived together for many years after. Their son was King Harald the Fine-Haired, who was first to become sole ruler over the whole of Norway."

The "Ragnarssona þáttr" was preserved in the Hauksbók by Haukr Erlendsson. The book is a collection of Old Norse tales and was compiled in the early 14th century.

Heimskringla

A similar account is given in the "Saga of Halfdan the Black", part of the Heimskringla by Snorri Sturluson. The Kings' sagas included were written in the 13th century.

"Sigurd Hjort was the name of a king in Ringerike, who was stouter and stronger than any other man, and his equal could not be seen for a handsome appearance. His father was Helge Hvasse (the Sharp); and his mother was Aslaug, a daughter of Sigurd the worm-eyed, who again was a son of Ragnar Lodbrok. It is told of Sigurd that when he was only twelve years old he killed in single combat the berserk Hildebrand, and eleven others of his comrades; and many are the deeds of manhood told of him in a long saga about his feats. Sigurd had two children, one of whom was a daughter, called Ragnhild, then twenty years of age, and an excellent brisk girl. Her brother Guthorm was a youth." The account slightly differs from the Ragnarssona þáttr when giving the age of Ragnhild at the time of Sigurd Hart's death. According to Ragnarssona þáttr, she was fifteen years old, but according to Halfdan the Black's saga, she was twenty.

"It is related in regard to Sigurd's death that he had a custom of riding out quite alone in the uninhabited forest to hunt the wild beasts that are hurtful to man, and he was always very eager at this sport. One day he rode out into the forest as usual, and when he had ridden a long way he came out at a piece of cleared land near to Hadeland. There the berserk Hake came against him with thirty men, and they fought. Sigurd Hjort fell there, after killing twelve of Hake's men; and Hake himself lost one hand, and had three other wounds. Then Hake and his men rode to Sigurd's house, where they took his daughter Ragnhild and her brother Guthorm, and carried them, with much property and valuable articles, home to Hadeland, where Hake had many great farms. He ordered a feast to be prepared, intending to hold his wedding with Ragnhild; but the time passed on account of his wounds, which healed slowly; and the berserk Hake of Hadeland had to keep his bed, on account of his wounds, all the autumn and beginning of winter."

"Now King Halfdan was in Hedemark at the Yule entertainments when he heard this news; and one morning early, when the king was dressed, he called to him Harek Gand, and told him to go over to Hadeland, and bring him Ragnhild, Sigurd Hjort's daughter. Harek got ready with a hundred men, and made his journey so that they came over the lake to Hake's house in the grey of the morning, and beset all the doors and stairs of the places where the house-servants slept. Then they broke into the sleeping-room where Hake slept, took Ragnhild, with her brother Guthorm, and all the goods that were there, and set fire to the house-servants' place, and burnt all the people in it. Then they covered over a magnificent waggon, placed Ragnhild and Guthorm in it, and drove down upon the ice. Hake got up and went after them a while; but when he came to the ice on the lake, he turned his sword-hilt to the ground and let himself fall upon the point, so that the sword went through him. He was buried under a mound on the banks of the lake."

"When King Halfdan, who was very quick of sight, saw the party returning over the frozen lake, and with a covered waggon, he knew that their errand was accomplished according to his desire. Thereupon he ordered the tables to be set out, and sent people all round in the neighbourhood to invite plenty of guests; and the same day there was a good feast which was also Halfdan's marriage-feast with Ragnhild, who became a great queen. Ragnhild's mother was Thorny, a daughter of Klakharald king in Jutland, and a sister of Thrye Dannebod who was married to the Danish king, Gorm the Old, who then ruled over the Danish dominions."

"Ragnhild, who was wise and intelligent, dreamt great dreams. She dreamt, for one, that she was standing out in her herb-garden, and she took a thorn out of her shift; but while she was holding the thorn in her hand it grew so that it became a great tree, one end of which struck itself down into the earth, and it became firmly rooted; and the other end of the tree raised itself so high in the air that she could scarcely see over it, and it became also wonderfully thick. The under part of the tree was red with blood, but the stem upwards was beautifully green and the branches white as snow. There were many and great limbs to the tree, some high up, others low down; and so vast were the tree's branches that they seemed to her to cover all Norway, and even much more."

"Queen Ragnhild gave birth to a son, and water was poured over him, and the name of Harald given him, and he soon grew stout and remarkably handsome. As he grew up he became very expert at all feats, and showed also a good understanding. He was much beloved by his mother, but less so by his father."

== Historicity ==
According to "A History of the Vikings" (1968) by Gwyn Jones, "the written sources of the twelfth century and thirteenth centuries must be regarded with scepticism or downright disbelief" when they portray the chieftains, jarls and kings of Viking Age Norway. "Their world is that of tradition and folktale rather than history". Jones considers however that the grandparents of Harald I of Norway "loom closer to the frontier of history." The assassination of Gudrød the Hunter by command of his wife Åsa could be estimated to c. 840. Halfdan the Black was their son. The account of the assassination is given in the Ynglinga saga, also written by Snorri Sturluson. "They had a son by their marriage called Halfdan; and the autumn that Halfdan was a year old Gudrod went upon a round of feasts. He lay with his ship in Stiflesund, where they had been drinking hard, so that the king was very tipsy. In the evening, about dark, the king left the ship; and when he had got to the end of the gangway from the ship to the shore, a man ran against him, thrust a spear through him, and killed him. The man was instantly put to death, and in the morning when it was light the man was discovered to be Åsa's page-boy: nor did she conceal that it was done by her orders."

The saga of Halfdan the Black portrays its hero rising to the throne of Agder and Vestfold at the age of eighteen years (c. 858). "When he was eighteen years old he took his kingdom in Agder, and went immediately to Vestfold, where he divided that kingdom, as before related, with his brother Olaf." Olaf being Olaf Geirstad-Alf, a paternal half-brother to Halfdan. Gwynn considers that accounts of how Ragnhild was married to Halfdan "are heavy with the accoutrement of fictional saga". Wedding and bedding the rescued princess the same day of meeting her follows "the highest tradition of the Sagas of Old Time."

The identification of Ragnhild as a niece of Thyra is considered improbable due to chronology involved. Ragnhild would be a 9th-century figure while Thyra became Queen consort of Denmark in the 10th century. Gwynn considers the saga of Halfdan the Black to be able to give some historical information but dismisses its second part, covering events from the marriage with Ragnhild to his death, as based on "legend, folktale, and dreams." The dream of Ragnhild has a clear implication, that "her progeny would flourish like a great tree with blood-red roots, green trunk, and snow-white branches which would cover the whole of Norway and lands father afield." Such dreams of future greatness were reported in tales concerning the parents of other conquerors. Gwyn points to a literary tradition of such "dreams," dating at least to the surviving narratives about Cyrus the Great. Such tales would also exist about figures born later that Harald I, such as Sigurd I of Norway.
