= Halfdan the Black =

Ninth-century King of Vestfold

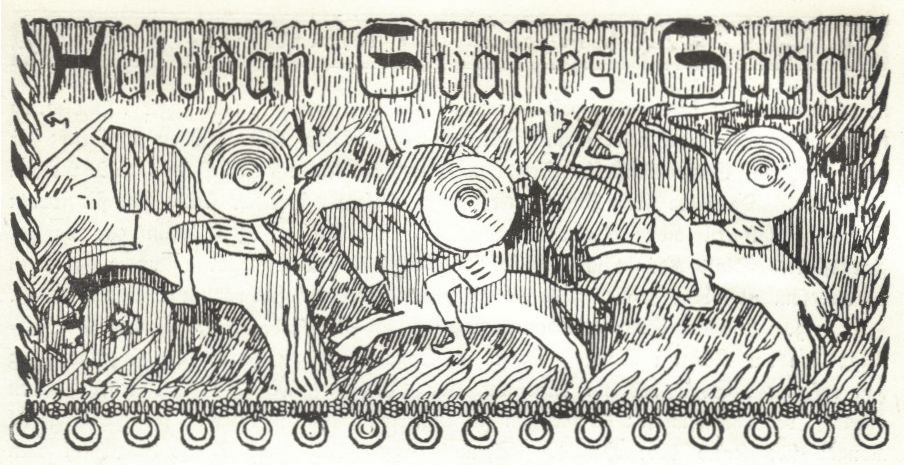
- Halvdan Svartes saga. Gerhard Munthe, Heimskringla, 1899
- Noble family: House of Yngling
- Spouses: Ragnhild Haraldsdotter Gulskeg; Ragnhild Sigurdsdotter
- Father: Gudrød the Hunter
- Mother: Åsa Haraldsdottir of Agder

Halfdan the Black (Old Norse: Halfdanr Svarti; fl. c. 9th century) was a king of Vestfold. He belonged to the House of Yngling and was the father of Harald Fairhair, the first king of a unified Norway.

== In sagas ==
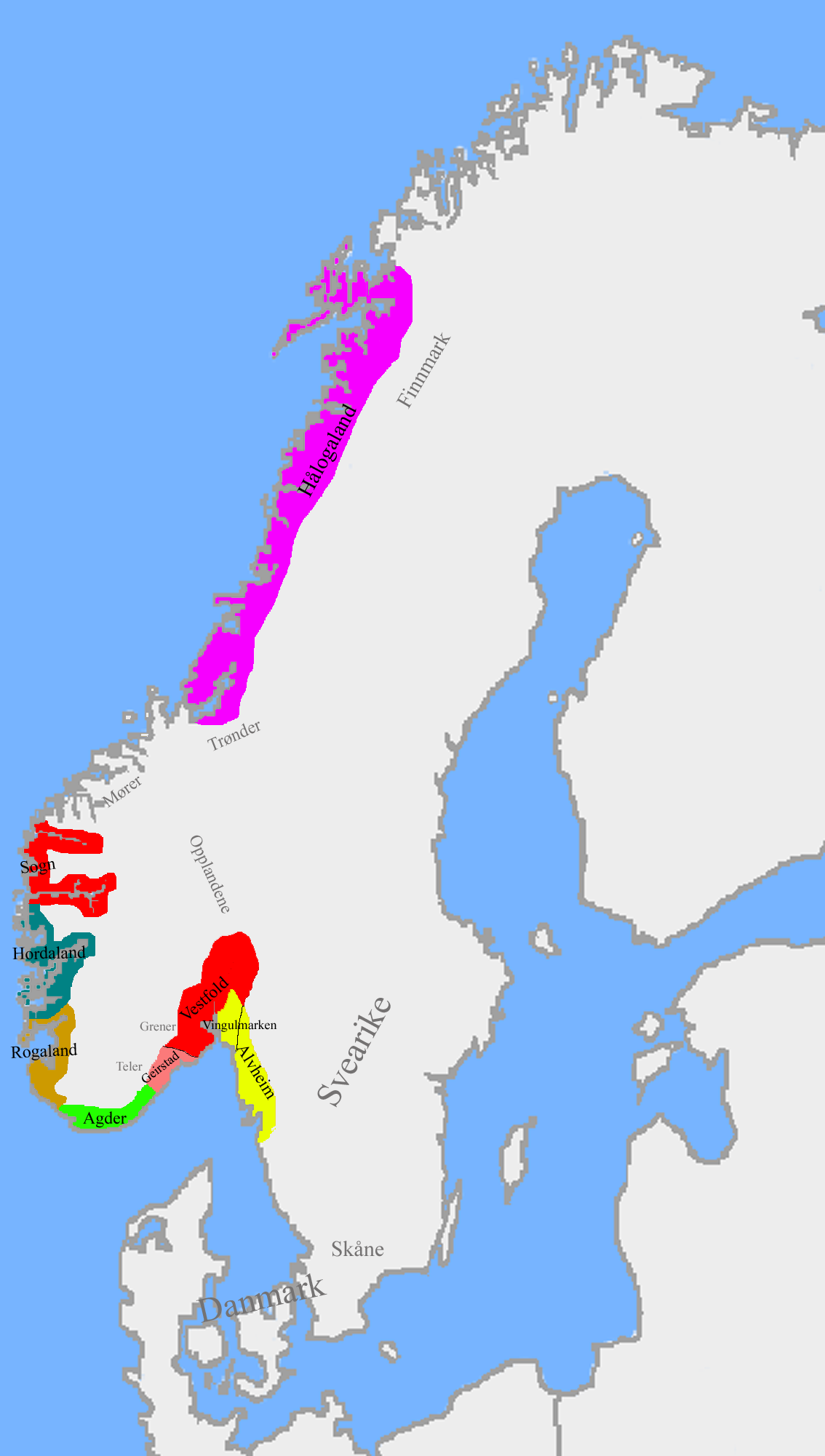
Petty kingdoms ca. 860 AD. The kingdom of Halfdan the Black is shown in red

According to Íslendingabók, Heimskringla and Fagrskinna, Halfdan was the son of the Yngling King Gudrød the Hunter. Heimskringla also names his mother, as Åsa, daughter of King Harald of Agder, and his half-brother as Olaf Geirstad-Alf. Heimskringla relates that when Halfdan's father was killed, Åsa took the 1 year-old Halfdan and returned to Agder, where Halfdan was raised. When he was 18 or 19 years old, Halfdan became king of Agder. He quickly began adding to his kingdom, through political negotiation and military conquest. He divided the kingdom of Vestfold with his brother Olaf and, through military action, persuaded King Gandalf of Vingulmark to cede half his kingdom. Based on the formulaic nature of his ties to his predecessors, his strong affiliation with Agder, and the failure of an early saga dedicated to him to name any family connections, some scholars have suggested that the linkage to the earlier Yngling dynasty of Vestfold was a later invention, created to associate a conquering Halfdan and his son Harald Fairhair with the family glorified in the Ynglingatal, whom he had displaced.

Halfdan next is said to have subdued an area called Raumarike. To secure his claim to Raumarike, Halfdan first defeated and killed the previous ruler, Sigtryg Eysteinsson, in battle. He then defeated Sigtryg's brother and successor Eystein, in a series of battles. This established Halfdan's claim not only to Raumarike, but also to half of Hedmark, the core of Sigtryg and Eystein's kingdom. These details are only mentioned in Heimskringla.

Fagrskinna and Heimskringla both agree that Halfdan's first wife was Ragnhild, daughter of King Harald Gulskeg (Goldbeard) of Sogn. Halfdan and Ragnhild had a son named "Harald" after his grandfather, and they sent him to be raised at his grandfather's court. Harald Gulskeg, being elderly, named his grandson as his successor, shortly before his death. Ragnhild died shortly after her father, and the young king Harald fell sick and died the next spring. When Halfdan heard about his son's death, he travelled to Sogn and laid claim to the title of king. No resistance was offered, and Halfdan added Sogn to his realm. The narrative in Heimskringla then adds another conquest for King Halfdan. In Vingulmark, the sons of Gandalf of Vingulmark, Hysing, Helsing, and Hake, attempted to ambush Halfdan at night, but he escaped into the forest. After raising an army, he returned to defeat the brothers, killing Hysing and Helsing. Hake fled the country, and Halfdan became king of all of Vingulmark.

According to Heimskringla, Halfdan's second wife, also named Ragnhild, had been kidnapped from her home by Hake, a "berserker" who encountered her father in Hadeland and killed him. Halfdan had her kidnapped from Hake, so that he could marry her. Fagrskinna does not mention any of these details. However, both sagas agree that Ragnhild and Halfdan had a son who was also named Harald. (Among the more unlikely claims in Fagrskinna and Heimskringla are that this woman was Ragnhild Sigurdsdotter, daughter of Sigurd Hjort, king of Ringerike. This would make Ragnhild the granddaughter or even great-granddaughter of Sigurd Snake-in-the-Eye – an impossibility, given that most sources suggest that Sigurd Snake-in-the-Eye was active only in the late 9th century, which would mean that he was born a generation or two after Halfdan the Black.)

== Halvdanshaugen ==
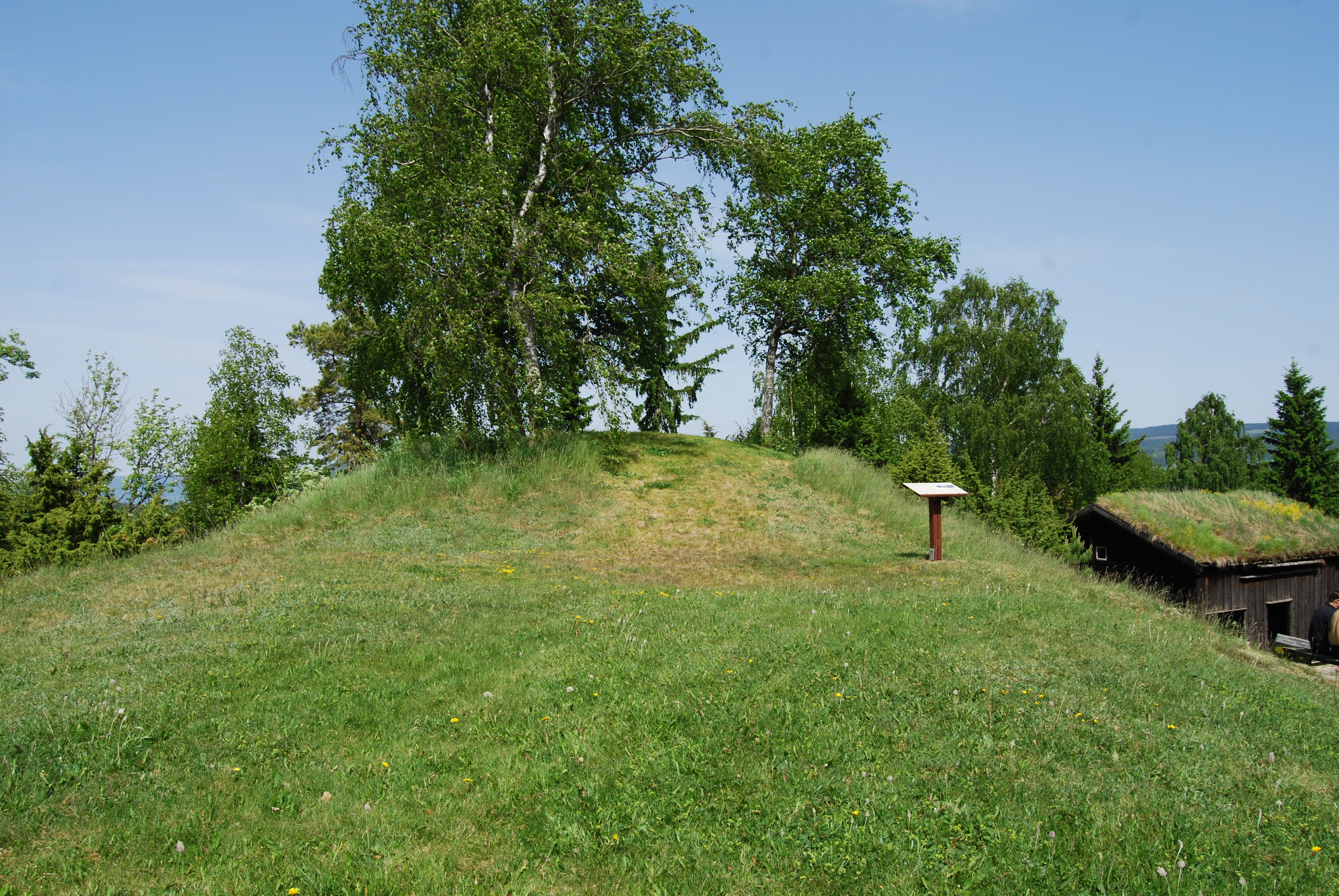
Halvdanshaugen at Hadeland Folkemuseum, one of the several burial sites of Halfdan the Black

Heimskringla, Fagrskinna, Ágrip and Historia Norwegiæ all relate that Halfdan drowned when he fell through the ice at the inlet Røykenvik in the lake Randsfjorden on his return home from Hadeland. His horse and sleigh broke through ice weakened by cattle dung near a watering hole dug in the frozen lake. He was buried in a mound at Stein in Ringerike (Halvdanshaugen på Stein).

Heimskringla's narrative adds that each of the districts of his kingdom wanted to claim his grave, and that it was agreed to divide his body into four pieces so each district could bury a piece of it, resulting in four different sites called Halvdanshaugen (from the Old Norse word haugr meaning mound). According to this version, only his head is buried in Ringerike.

== Sources ==
No contemporary sources mention Halfdan, and the details of his life that are provided by later kings' sagas are considered semi-legendary by modern historians. Although he has his own saga in Heimskringla, it lacks any skaldic verse, which is normally used by Snorri as supporting evidence and this, combined with its rather legendary character, leads historians to be wary of seeing much veracity in it. The "Black" nickname was given to him because of his black hair.

Halfdan is mentioned in Ari Þorgilsson's Íslendingabók (c. 1133) , Snorri Sturluson's Heimskringla (c. 1230), Fagrskinna (c. 1220), Ágrip (c. 1190) and Historia Norwegiæ (late 12th century). The most elaborate story is found in the latest saga, Heimskringla. According to the Latin Historia Norwegiæ, Halvdan was a king "in montanis" (in the mountains), which is usually equivalent to Oppland in the Old Norse. This conflicts with the version told in Heimskringla.

Halfdan the Black House of Yngling Born: c. 810 Died: c. 860
Preceded by Gudrød the Hunter	Head of the House of Yngling	Succeeded by Harald Fairhair
