= Guthorm Sigurdsson =

Son of Sigurd Hart, King of Ringerike

Guthormr or Guttormr was according to traditions current in Iceland in the eleventh and twelfth centuries, a noble of Danish origin operating in Norway and the maternal uncle of Norway's first king, Harald Fairhair. By various sources he is said to have been the son of Sigurd Hart, brother of Ragnhild Sigurdsdotter and the descendant of Ragnar Lodbrok. Several sources gives him the title dux and hertỏga both meaning "duke".

== Family ==
Sources on Guthorm describes him as the son of Sigurd Hart and younger brother of Ragnhild Sigurdsdotter. Ragnhild Sigurdsdotter's parentage is controversial as two differing accounts appear in medieval genealogy varies in her parentage. He is alternatively described as the daughter of his son Sigurd Snake-in-the-Eye, while others describe her as the daughter of Sigurd Hart and Sigurd Snake-in-the-Eye's granddaughter, adding an additional generation. Attempts to fit the chronology of the sagas with history does not work with the additional generation between Sigurd Snake-in-the-Eye and Harald Fairhair.

== Sources ==
=== Heimskringla ===
In Heimskringla, in the section labelled the "Saga of Halfdan the Black" tells of Sigurd Hart, the grandson of Sigurd Snake-in-the-Eye and great grandson of Ragnar Lodbrok. Sigurd had two children: a daughter named Ragnhild and a son called Guthorm. Haki, a berserker encountered her father in Hadeland and killed him, before kidnapping Ragnhild and Guthorm. Soon afterwards, Ragnhild and Guthorm were kidnapped by Halfdan the Black's sorcerer Horik Gand, so that Halfdan could marry Ragnhild. Fagrskinna does not mention any of these details. However, both sagas agree that Ragnhild and Halfdan the Black were the parents of Harald Fairhair.

In the following "Saga of Harald Fairhair" Guthorm is said to have been made the leader of Halfdan's hird and played a instrumental role in the defence of Harald's kingdom during his minority. Halfdan the Black drowned while chasing thieves over a frozen lake. His son Harald was only ten years old at the time and Halfdan's various enemies attacked the kingdom. Through Guthorm's guidance, Harald managed to defeat all the invaders despite his young age, starting Harald's conquest of Norway. Guthorm did not take further part of the conquest, rather ruling Harald's original domains during the campaign.

Harald named one of his sons after Guthorm and subsequently made his uncle the local governor of Upland and Viken, ruling from Tønsberg. He died of old age.

Heimskringla gives Guthorm the title dux (duke), a title which was not known to have been used in Norway in the 9th and 10th century when Guthorm is supposed to have lived.

=== Ragnarssona þáttr ===
Ragnarssona þáttr presents a near identical story to the account in Heimskringla of Sigurd Hart, his death and Ragnhild's marriage to Halfdan; as in Heimskringla Guthorm is described as Ragnhild's younger brother who is kidnapped and later rescued from Haki. Ragnarssona þáttr differs only in certain details from Heimskringla in certain details like the ages of Guthorm and Ragnhild: Heimskringla describes Ragnhild as twenty years old at her father's death while in Ragnarssona þáttr she's only fifteen. Likewise, Ragnarssona þáttr gives Guthorm's death at that time as fourteen while Heimskringla simply says he was a child, which implies an even younger age.

=== Egil's Saga ===
Guthorm appears in Egil's Saga as Guttorm which tells of his otherwise unattested children. Guttorm is again described as the son of Sigurd Hart and the maternal uncle of Harald (who the saga refers to as Harald Lufa). In this account he ruled as governor over Westfold, Ringerike and parts of Agder. His children are said to be two sons named Sigurd and Ragnar and two named daughters Ragnhild and Aslaug. Sigurd and Ragnar are killed in a revenge attack by the saga protagonist's grandfather Kveld-Ulf and father Skallagrim against two of Harald's retainers who participated in Harald's killing of Kveld-Ulf's son Thorulf. The collateral killing of the children mirrors Egil's later killing of Harald's grandson Rögnvald in a similar revenge attack aimed at the retainers of Harald's son Eirik Bloodaxe.

=== Flateyjarbók ===
Flateyjarbók briefly mentions Guthorm in Haralds þáttr hárfagra and also gives him the title "duke". The account says that Guthorm was sixteen at Harald's ascension to the crown, while Harald himself was ten. Guthorm is described as the regent for Harald after Halfdan the Black's death and subsequently his military commander. Unlike Heimskringla, Guthorm is said to have continued to fight alongside Harald during the conquest of Norway.
