= Ulvøya =

Ulvøya may refer to several islands in Norway:

- Ulvøya (Hadsel), an island in Hadsel municipality, Nordland county
- Ulvøya (Hitra), an island in Hitra municipality, Trøndelag county
- Ulvøya (Karmøy), an island in Karmøy municipality, Rogaland county
- Ulvøya (Lurøy), an island in Lurøy municipality, Nordland county
- Ulvøya (Oslo), an island in Oslo municipality, Oslo county
