= Ring II of Ringerike =

Ring II was a mythical king of Ringerike. He was the son of a king of Ringerike and father (or, in some sources, grandfather) of king Gudrød of Ringerike and prince Helgi the Sharp.

He, like his ancestors on the father's side, is only known in legends and had a reported lifespan of hundreds of years. He was descended from Halfdan, who was the grandson of Nor, the one who named Norway and ruled it as king.
