= Sigurd Hart =

Norwegian petty king (est. 816 – 856)

Sigurd Hart or Sigurd Hjort was a legendary king of Ringerike (modern central south Norway), during the late 9th or early 10th centuries. He is mentioned in Ragnarssona þáttr ("The Tale of Ragnar's Sons") and in Halvdan Svartes saga ("Halfdan the Black's Saga").

Ragnarssona þáttr states that Sigurd Hart was the son of Helgi the Sharp (the great-great-grandson of king Ring of Ringerike) of the Dagling dynasty and Helgi's wife Aslaug. Helgi was reportedly the son-in-law of Sigurd Snake-in-the-Eye (one of Ragnar Lodbrok's sons) and Blaeja, the daughter of king Aelle II of Northumbria.

== Biography ==
"Sigurd Hjort was the name of a king in Ringerike, who was stouter and stronger than any other man, and his equal could not be seen for a handsome appearance. His father was Helge Hvasse (the Sharp); and his mother was Aslaug, a daughter of Sigurd the snake-eyed, who again was a son of Ragnar Lodbrok. It is told of Sigurd that when he was only twelve years old he killed in single combat the berserk Hildebrand, and eleven others of his comrades; and many are the deeds of manhood told of him in a long saga about his feats. Sigurd had two children, one of whom was a daughter, called Ragnhild, then twenty years of age, and an excellent brisk girl. Her brother Guthorm was a youth. It is related in regard to Sigurd's death that he had a custom of riding out quite alone in the uninhabited forest to hunt the wild beasts that are hurtful to man, and he was always very eager at this sport. One day he rode out into the forest as usual, and when he had ridden a long way he came out at a piece of cleared land near to Hadeland. There the berserk Hake came against him with thirty men, and they fought. Sigurd Hjort fell there, after killing twelve of Hake's men; and Hake himself lost one hand, and had three other wounds. Then Hake and his men rode to Sigurd's house, where they took his daughter Ragnhild and her brother Guthorm, and carried them, with much property and valuable articles, home to Hadeland, where Hake had many great farms." (Halvdan Svartes saga ("Halfdan the Black's Saga").

Traditional sources state that Sigurd Hart was only 12 years old when he slew a berserker named Hildibrand in a duel, and 11 other men. He married a woman named Ingeborg (supposedly the daughter of the historical Jutish chieftain Harald Klak, c. 785 – c. 852, although Harald was probably too old for that to be true). Sigurd Hart and Ingeborg had children named Guthorm Sigurdsson and Ragnhild Sigurdsdotter. When Sigurd Hart's uncle, king Fróði of Ringerike died, Sigurd Hart supposedly went to Norway to succeed him as king of Ringerike.

There are a number of unlikely claims or implied claims about Sigurd Hart's descendants in Ragnarssona þáttr, Heimskringla, and Fagrskinna.

- One is the suggestion that he was the father of Ragnhild Sigurdsdotter, who was kidnapped by, and the wife of, Halfdan the Black (c. 810 – c. 860), and mother of Harald Fairhair. This would seem impossible unless two different men named Sigurd Hart were involved – given that most sources suggest that his father was active in the late 9th century, which would make Sigurd Hart about two generations younger than Ragnhild Sigurdsdotter.
- Another unlikely claim suggests that the legendary Danish king Harthacanute (born c. 880) was a descendant of Sigurd Hart, although Harthacanute may well have been born before Sigurd. (Harthacanute succeeded Sigtrygg Gnupasson as the king of Zealand, Scania and Halland, but he lost Viken (Oslofjord). He was the father of Gorm the Old (born before 900), the king of Denmark. Gorm succeeded his father as king and married Thyra. Gorm's son, Harald Bluetooth (born c. 935) succeeded his father as king and married Gyrid of Sweden. They had a son named Sweyn Forkbeard. Sweyn succeeded his father as king and married Gunhild (Świętosława of Poland). They had a son named Cnut the Great. Sweyn also ruled England in his lifetime and established the Danish Empire. When Sweyn died, his elder son Harald Svendsen became the King of Denmark, while England's former king, Ethelred reclaimed the throne. Following Harald's death, his brother Cnut the Great became king, re-established the Danish North Sea Empire. He married Emma of Normandy with whom he had a son named Harthacnut. When Cnut died, Harthacnut became king of Denmark and England. Upon his death, Edward the Confessor became ruler of England in 1042.)
