= Sigfred and Halfdan =

King of the Danes
- Reign: c. 873
- Predecessor: Horik II
- Successor: Helge
- Born: 9th century Denmark
- Died: 877 (?) and 891 (?); Irish Sea (?) and Leuven(?)
- Dynasty: Lodbrok (?)
- Father: unknown, possibly Ragnar Lodbrok
- Religion: Norse paganism

Sigfred and Halfdan were two brothers who figured as Kings of the Danes in 873. Little is known about them; they are the last Danish rulers recorded by contemporary sources before the 930s.

== Diplomacy with the East Frankish Kingdom ==
The last known ruler of Gudfred's dynasty, Horik II, died sometime after 864. Nine years later, in 873, we encounter two brothers who were co-rulers of the Danish realm, Sigfred and Halfdan. At Easter time in that year, Sigfred dispatched envoys to Biesenstätt close to Worms in East Francia, who met with King Louis the German. The envoys demanded that Danish traders would be allowed to pass the border to Saxony. Louis agreed to that. Later in the same year, in August, Sigfred's brother Halfdan sent envoys to Louis in Metz in a similar issue. They handed over a sword with golden handle as a gift from Halfdan, and asked Louis to accept the brothers as his "sons". Oaths of peace were sworn between the Danes and Franks. They agreed to meet later on at the Eider river, though no such meeting is recorded. This shows that South Jutland was part of their kingdom.

== Possible identities ==
For chronological reasons Sigfred and Halfdan were probably not sons of Horik II. There has been some speculation about their possible identity with contemporary persons with the same names.

A man named Halfdan was one of the leaders of the Danish vikings who invaded and occupied England during the late 860s. A later tradition claims this Halfdan as a son of the earlier viking leader Ragnar Lodbrok. It might be significant that the Halfdan who was in England may have been absent in 873, when he was not mentioned by Anglo-Saxon sources. He reportedly met a violent end in the Irish Sea in 877. Some scholars, such as Rory McTurk, have asserted that the Danish co-ruler Halfdan was almost certainly the same person as the viking leader.

In an analogous fashion, Sigfred could be synonymous with, or a real life prototype for the Sigurd Snake-in-the-Eye of later sagas – also a son of Ragnar Lodbrok and a king in Denmark. It has also been suggested that Sigfred was the same figure as a Viking ruler of that name who besieged Paris in 885 and was killed in Frisia in 887.

In the cataclysmic Battle of Leuven (891), two Danish vikings named Sigfred and Gudfred were reported to have been killed by the East Frankish king Arnulf of Carinthia. Some scholars believe that this was Sigurd-Snake-in-the-Eye, and the name Sigfred resulted from an annalist confusing Sigurd with the Sigfred who had been killed in 887. However, a later account by Adam of Bremen, drawing on Norse tradition, implies that Sigfred and Gudfred were kings of Denmark, who were succeeded as king by Helge.

Legendary titles
Preceded by Horik II	King of Denmark	Succeeded by Helge
