= Dagling =

The Dagling or Dögling dynasty was a legendary clan of the petty kingdom Ringerike in what today is Norway. It was descended from a Dag the Great.

In the Ynglinga saga, Snorri Sturluson writes that the clan was descended from Dag the Great whose daughter Dageid married the Swedish king Alrekr and was the mother of Yngvi and Alf.

== Dag of the nine sons ==
Stanza 18 of the Hyndluljóð reads:

Dagr átti Þóru drengja móður, ólusk í ætt þar æðstir kappar: Fraðmarr ok Gyrðr ok Frekar báðir, Ámr ok Jösurmarr, Alfr inn gamli. Varðar, at viti svá. Viltu enn lengra?	The mate of Dag was a mother of heroes, Thora, who bore him the bravest of fighters, Frathmar and Gyrth and the Frekis twain, Am and Jofurmar, Alf the Old; It is much to know,-- wilt thou hear yet more?

In the later Hversu Noregr byggðist, it is reported that Dag married a woman named Þóra drengjamóður and they had nine sons. Among them were Óli, Ámr, Jöfurr and Arngrim the berserker who married Eyfura.

This makes this Dag roughly contemporary with the Dag of Ynglinga saga, Hervarar saga and Orvar-Odd's saga, as Arngrim's sons Angantyr and his brother Hjörvard would have been the cousins of the Swedish king Yngvi, whose daughter Hjörvard wanted to marry. This proposal would lead to both Angantyr and his brothers being killed in battle against the Swedish hero Hjalmar and his Norwegian friend Orvar-Odd. The "Hversu Noregr Byggðist" tells that Dag's father, Halfdan the Old, received a promise from the gods that there would be no woman and no man who was not of great repute among his descendants for three hundred years.

Another one of Dag the Great's sons according to Hversu Noregr Byggðist was Óli, who was the father of Dag, the father of Óleif the father of Hring (the old king Ring of Frithiof's Saga), the father of Olaf, the father of Helgi, the father of Sigurd Hjort, the father of Ragnhild, who was the mother of Harald Fairhair.

This line partially agrees with the one found in Ragnarssona þáttr, where it is told instead that Dag the Great and his wife Þóra drengjamóður were the parents of Hring, the father of Ingi, the father of Ingjald, the father of Olaf, the father of Gudröd and Helgi the Sharp. Helgi married the daughter of Sigurd Snake-in-the-Eye and had the son Sigurd Hjort, the father of Ragnhild, the mother of Harald Fairhair.
