= Gandalf Alfgeirsson =

King of the petty kingdom of Vingulmark

Gandalf Alfgeirsson (Old Norse: Gandálf Álfgeirsson) was a legendary king of the petty kingdom Alfheim, in south-eastern Norway and south-western Sweden He is portrayed in Snorri Sturluson's saga Heimskringla.

Heimskringla relates that Gandalf was given the kingdom of Alfheim by his father Alfgeir. A Gandalf, normally taken to be the same, fought with Halfdan the Black for overlordship of what would become Norway under Halfdan the Black's son Harald Fairhair. They reached a temporary agreement to share Vingulmork between them. In a later episode, apparently after Gandalf's death, his three sons, Hysing, Helsing, and Hake, attempted to ambush Halfdan the Black at night but he escaped into the forest. After raising an army, he returned and defeated the brothers, killing Hysing and Helsing. Hake fled from the country and Halfdan became king of all of Vingulmórk (possibly all of old Alfheim).

The stories of Gandalf and his sons was found in a place historically called Álfheimr which spans modern-day Bohuslän, in Sweden, rivers Göta and Klara, originating in Trysil, as well as Glåmma, both the east and the west fold of Vingulmórk (cf. Oslo), the part of Alfheim given to King Guðrød Halfdanson by King Alfarinn as dowry, when princess Alfhild was married to the grandfather of Harald Fairhair. Olaf Geirstadalv's mother was, if not identical to Alfhild, his aunt called Olöf.

== Family ==
Gandalf's only known wife was Gauthild Gyrithe Alfsdottir. They had (presumably) four children, three sons and a daughter.

- Alfhild
- Hysing
- Helsing
- Haki

== Ancestry ==
Gandalf's father was King Alfgeir.

Ancestors of Gandalf Alfgeirsson

4. Vatnarr Haraldsson
2. Alfgeir Vatnarsson
5. Unknown
1. Gandalf Alfgeirsson
6. Bundi Leinfrisson
3. Queen Brynhild Bundalsdatter
7. Helgi Halfdansdatter
