= Helgi the Sharp (Ringerike) =

In Ragnarssona þáttr, Helgi the Sharp, prince of Ringerike (Old Norse: Helgi Hvassi) was a grandson of king Ring II of Ringerike and the brother of Guðrøðr, the king of Ringerike and they lived in the 9th century.

Ragnar Lodbrok's sons Sigurd Snake-in-the-Eye, Björn Ironside and Hvitserk had raided in France and after Björn had gone home to Sweden, his brothers were attacked by emperor Arnulf of Carinthia. In the battle thousands of Danes and Norwegians fell, including Sigurd Snake-in-the-Eye and king Guðrøðr.

Helgi escaped from the battle with Sigurd Snake-in-the-Eye's banner, sword and shield. He went to Denmark and informed Sigurd's mother Aslaug of her loss. Since the next king, Harthacnut, was still too young to rule, Helgi stayed in Denmark as its regent. There, Helgi married Harthacanute's twin sister, also named Aslaug, and they had the son Sigurd Hart.
