= Hysing =

Hysing is a surname. Notable people with the surname include:

- Ahlert Hysing (1793–1879), Norwegian educator and politician
- Hans Hysing (1678–1752/1753), Swedish portrait-painter
- Per Hysing-Dahl (1920–1989), Norwegian resistance member, pilot, industry manager and politician
