= Sigurd Snake-in-the-Eye =

Legendary king of Denmark

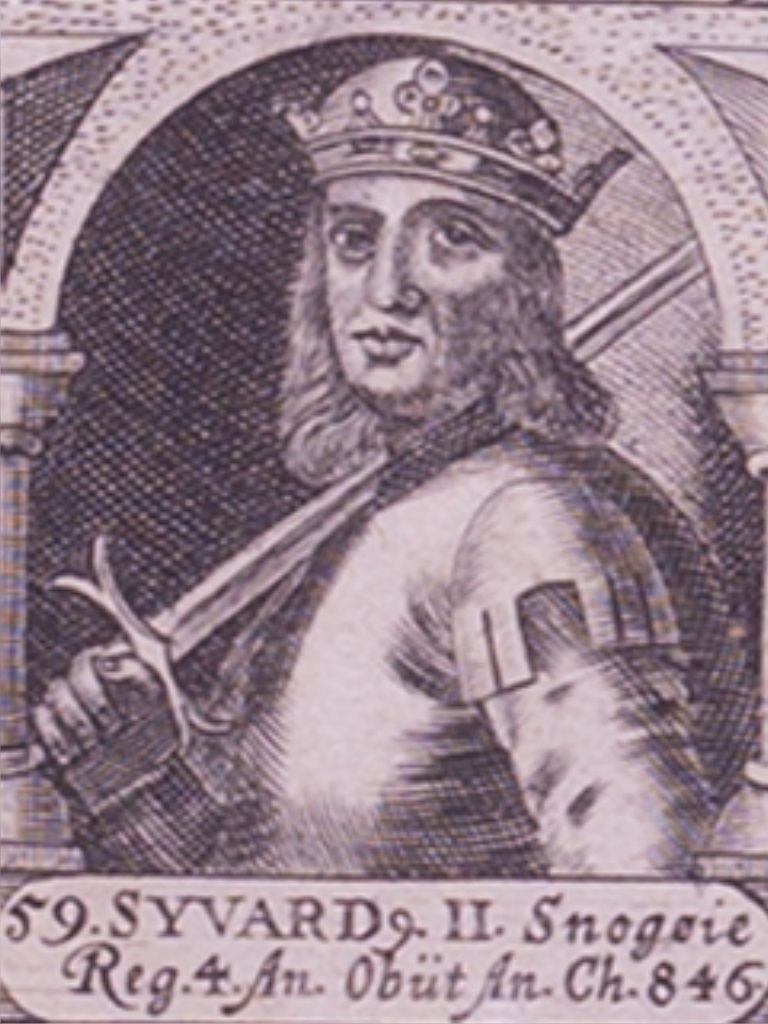
- Engraving from 1670

Legendary kings of Denmark
- Reign: c. 873?
- Predecessor: Halfdan Ragnarsson
- Successor: Harthacnut I, Helge or Olof the Brash
- Born: Sigurd Áslaugsson
- Died: 887 AD (killed in Frisia)
- Dynasty: Sigfredian
- Father: Ragnar Lodbrok
- Mother: Aslaug
- Religion: Norse Paganism

Sigurd Snake-in-the-Eye (Old Norse: Sigurðr ormr í auga) or Sigurd Ragnarsson was a semi-legendary Viking warrior and Danish king active from the mid to late 9th century. According to multiple saga sources and Scandinavian histories from the 12th century and later, he is one of the sons of the legendary Viking Ragnar Lodbrok and Aslaug. His historical prototype might have been the Danish King Sigfred who ruled briefly in the 870s. Norwegian kings' genealogies of the Middle Ages name him as an ancestor of Harald Fairhair and used his mother's supposed ancestry to Völsung in order to create an ancestry between Harald and his descendants along with Odin and Frigg.

== Early life ==
"Snake-in-the-eye" as part of Sigurd's name denoted a physical characteristic. He was born with a mark in his left eye, described as the image of the ouroboros (a snake biting its own tail).

According to Ragnar Lothbrok's saga, while Sigurd was just a boy, his half-brothers Eric and Agnar were killed by Swedish king Eysteinn Beli (also known as Östen). When Áslaug heard the news of Eric and Agnar's death, even though she was not their mother, she cried blood and asked the other sons of Ragnar to avenge their dead brothers. Because the Swedish king controlled Uppsala and a holy cow named Sibilja, Ivar the Boneless believed gods were on Eysteinn's side and feared the magic that ruled there. However, when his younger brother, the three-year-old Sigurd Snake-in-the-Eye, wanted to attack Eysteinn, the brothers changed their minds. Sigurd's foster-father assembled five longships for him. Hvitserk and Björn Ironside mustered 14, and Aslaug and Ivar the Boneless marshaled 10 ships each, and together they took vengeance upon Eysteinn.

The Danish historian Saxo Grammaticus relates that Sigurd, as a young man, was close to his father and sojourned for a time in Scotland and the Scottish Islands. After Ragnar's Viking army had slain the local earls, Sigurd and his brother Radbard were appointed sub-rulers of these territories. Later in life Sigurd and his brothers accompanied Ragnar on a hazardous expedition through Rus' to the Hellespont.

== Death of Ragnar Lothbrok and the Great Heathen Army ==
Most of the legendary sources say that King Ælla of Northumbria killed Ragnar Lothbrok, in about 865, by having him thrown into a pit of snakes. According to traditional accounts, Ragnar is reputed to have exclaimed as he was dying: "How the young pigs would grunt if they knew what the old boar suffers!" Sigurd and his siblings were reportedly informed of their father's fate by an envoy from Ælla. As he heard the news, Sigurd was supposedly so affected that he cut himself to the bone with a knife he held in his hand; his brother Björn Ironside supposedly gripped a spear so tightly that the imprint of his fingers was left in the wood. Sigurd and his brothers swore they would avenge Ragnar's death.

In 865–866, the Viking leaders Ivar the Boneless and Ubbe crossed the North Sea with a stor hær ("Great Army"). Traditional accounts claim that all the surviving sons of Ragnar apart from Ivar launched a first attack on Ælla's kingdom, which failed. Sigurd's brother, Ivar the Boneless, devised a strategy in which the Great Heathen Army occupied and sacked York, to provoke Ælla into engaging on the Vikings' terms. Under Ivar's plan, the Vikings feigned retreat, leading Ælla to underestimate them and become encircled. According to Ragnarssona þáttr (The Tale of Ragnar's Sons, part of the Sagas of Ragnar Lothbrok), Ælla was captured alive and executed afterwards by blood eagle.

== Sigurd's descendants ==
Ragnarssona þáttr states that when his father died, Sigurd inherited Zealand, Scania, Halland, the Danish islands, and Viken. It is also possible he was for a time co-ruler of Denmark with his brother Halfdan, because Frankish sources mention certain Sigfred and Halfdan as rulers in 873 – the names Sigurd and Sigfred were often mixed up in Nordic literature. He could have succeeded his brother Halfdan Ragnarsson as the sole king of Denmark in about 877, when Halfdan fell in battle in the Irish Sea. A Danish Viking king called Sigfred, who appears to have become landless by this time, was killed in West Francia in 887; he is quite possibly the same person. Sigurd married Blaeja, the daughter of king Ælla of Northumbria and they had two children, Harthacanute and Áslaug Sigurðardóttir, who was married to Helge of the Dagling lineage.

Helge may have briefly succeeded his purported father-in-law as king of Denmark before being overthrown by Olof, a Viking chief who swept down from Sweden in about the year 900.

The Ragnarssona þáttr states that Danish king Harthacanute was a son of Sigurd. However, the 11th century chronicler Adam of Bremen mentions Hardegon (probably Harthacanute) as the son of a certain Sven. Hardegon or Harthacanute succeeded Sigtrygg Gnupasson as the king of part of Denmark (probably Jutland, but according to later tradition Zealand, Scania and Halland) in about 916. According to the Ragnarssona þáttr, he nevertheless lost Viken (Oslofjord) that had been part of the Danish realm in the 9th century. He was the father of Gorm the Old, the king of Denmark. Gorm succeeded his father as king and married Thyra.

Gorm's son, Harald Bluetooth succeeded his father as king and married possibly three times with Gunhild, Tove and Gyrid. Harald had a son named Sweyn Forkbeard. Sweyn succeeded his father as king and married Gunhild (Świętosława of Poland). They had a son named Cnut the Great. Sweyn also ruled England in his lifetime and established the Danish Empire. When Sweyn died, his elder son Harald Svendsen became the king of Denmark, while England's former king, Ethelred, reclaimed the throne. Following Harald's death, his brother Cnut the Great became king, re-established the Danish North Sea Empire. He married Emma of Normandy with whom he had a son named Harthacnut. When Cnut died (and after the brothers of Harthacnut also had died), Harthacnut became king of Denmark and England. Upon his death, Edward the Confessor became ruler of England in 1042. Sweyn Forkbeard also had a daughter, Estrid, from whom all ruling kings and queens of Denmark after 1047 descend.

Sigurd's daughter Áslaug, as mentioned above, married Helgi the Sharp of the Dagling dynasty. They had a son named Sigurd Hart, who married a woman named Ingeborg. Sigurd Hart and Ingeborg had children named Guttorm Sigurdsson and Ragnhild Sigurdsdotter. When Sigurd Hart's uncle, king Fróði of Ringerike died, Sigurd Hart supposedly went to Norway to succeed him as king of Ringerike.

== Popular culture ==
- Sigurd features prominently in the History Channel's 2013 television series Vikings played by David Lindström.
- Sigurd is also one of the antagonists in the 2014 video game DLC Mount and Blade: Viking Conquest.
- Sigurd appears in the feudal simulator video game Crusader Kings 3.
- Sigurd is also mentioned as a brother of Halfdan Ragnarsson in the 2020 video game Assassin's Creed Valhalla.

== Sources ==
- Tale of Ragnar's Sons (Ragnarssona þáttr)
- Tale of Ragnar Lodbrok (Ragnars saga Loðbrókar)

Legendary titles
Preceded by Halfdan Ragnarsson	King of Denmark	Succeeded by Helge or Olof
