= Ulvøya (Oslo) =

Island in Oslo, Norway

Coordinates: 59°52′13″N 10°46′23″E

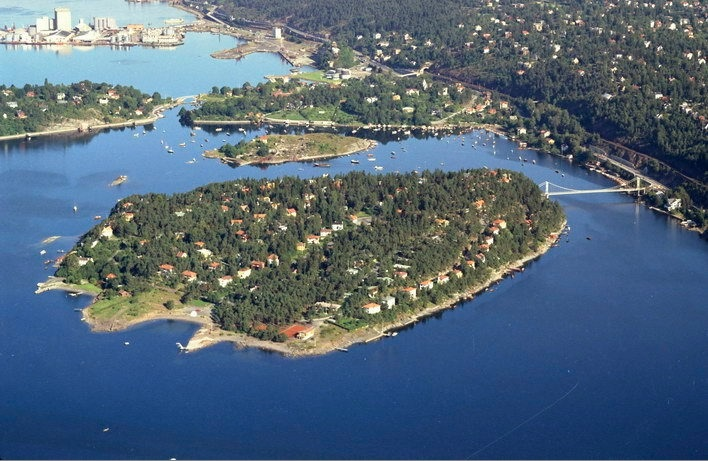
Aerial photo of Ulvøya in 1965

Ulvøya is an inhabited island in the inner part of Oslofjord, in the municipality of Oslo. It is located east of the island Malmøya and west of the mainland at Nordstrand. A bridge over the strait Ulvøysundet connects the island to the mainland. The island covers an area of 0.3 square kilometres (0.12 sq mi).

== The name ==
The first element is ulv 'wolf' - the last element is the finite form of øy 'island'.
