= Ringerike (traditional district) =

Coordinates: 60°17′30″N 10°02′56″E

- District
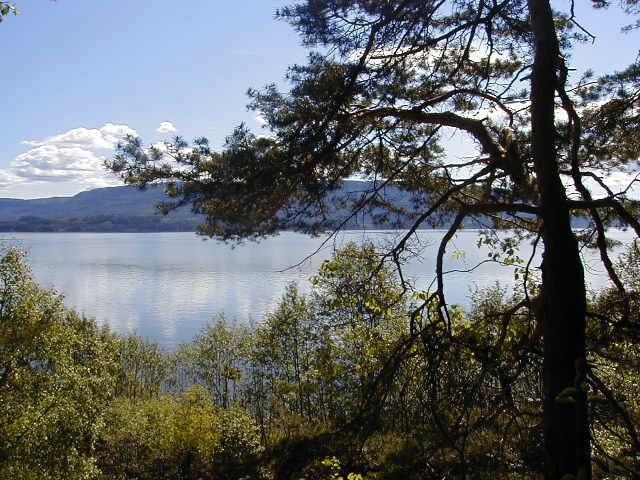
- View of Tyrifjorden, a lake in southern Ringerike.
- Interactive map of Ringerike
- Country: Norway
- County: Buskerud
- Region: Austlandet
- Largest town: Hønefoss

Area
  - Total: 3,801 km^{2} (1,468 sq mi)

Population (2015)
  - Total: 55,883
  - Density: 14.70/km^{2} (38.08/sq mi)
- Demonym: Ringeriking

Ringerike is a traditional district in Norway, commonly consisting of the municipalities Hole and Ringerike in Buskerud county. In older times, Ringerike had a larger range which went westward to the municipalities of Krødsherad, Modum, and Sigdal, also in Buskerud county.

Ringerike has a rich history that is connected with one of the most notable kings in the history of Norway, the father of King Harald Fairhair Halfdan the Black, who subdued Gandalf Alfgeirsson, King of Alfheim and half of Vingulmork, and the Dagling clan. Gandalf was possibly the last king of Ringerike, whose name is given to the eponymous King Hring, son of Raum the Old (cf. Romerike), son of Nór (the eponymous ancestor of Norwegians), according to the Sagas of the ancient Northernlands, better known as the Orkneyinga saga. It is possible that this, as the name suggests, was the legendary heartland of the House of Sigurd Hring and Ivar the Wide-Fathoming. There are also many archaeological remains in the area, dating to the medieval period and earlier.

== Etymology ==
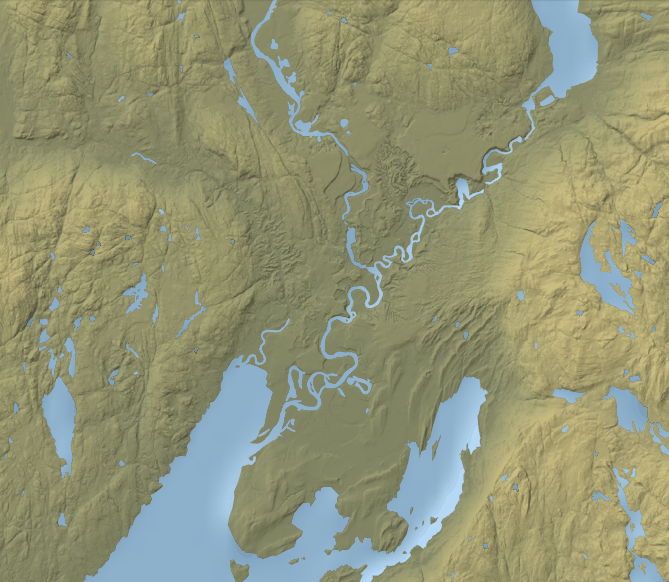
Terrain map highlighting the rivers Ådalselva and Randselva that form Storelva, which runs into Tyrifjorden.

The district was known in Old Norse as Hringaríki which means the reich of the Rings. The initial H was dropped sometime in the 13th century. The etymology of the district has been, however, contested among philologists.

Halvdan Koht suggested in 1921 that the first settlers of Ringerike settled around Tyrifjorden in a ring, though this theory is outdated to many.

It is suggested that Ringerike was named in a similar fashion to Romerike, which was named after the old name for Glomma, Rauma. Eivind Vågslid suggested in 1959 that Ringa was the old name of the river Storelva, because it meanders in a ring-shaped form.

== History ==
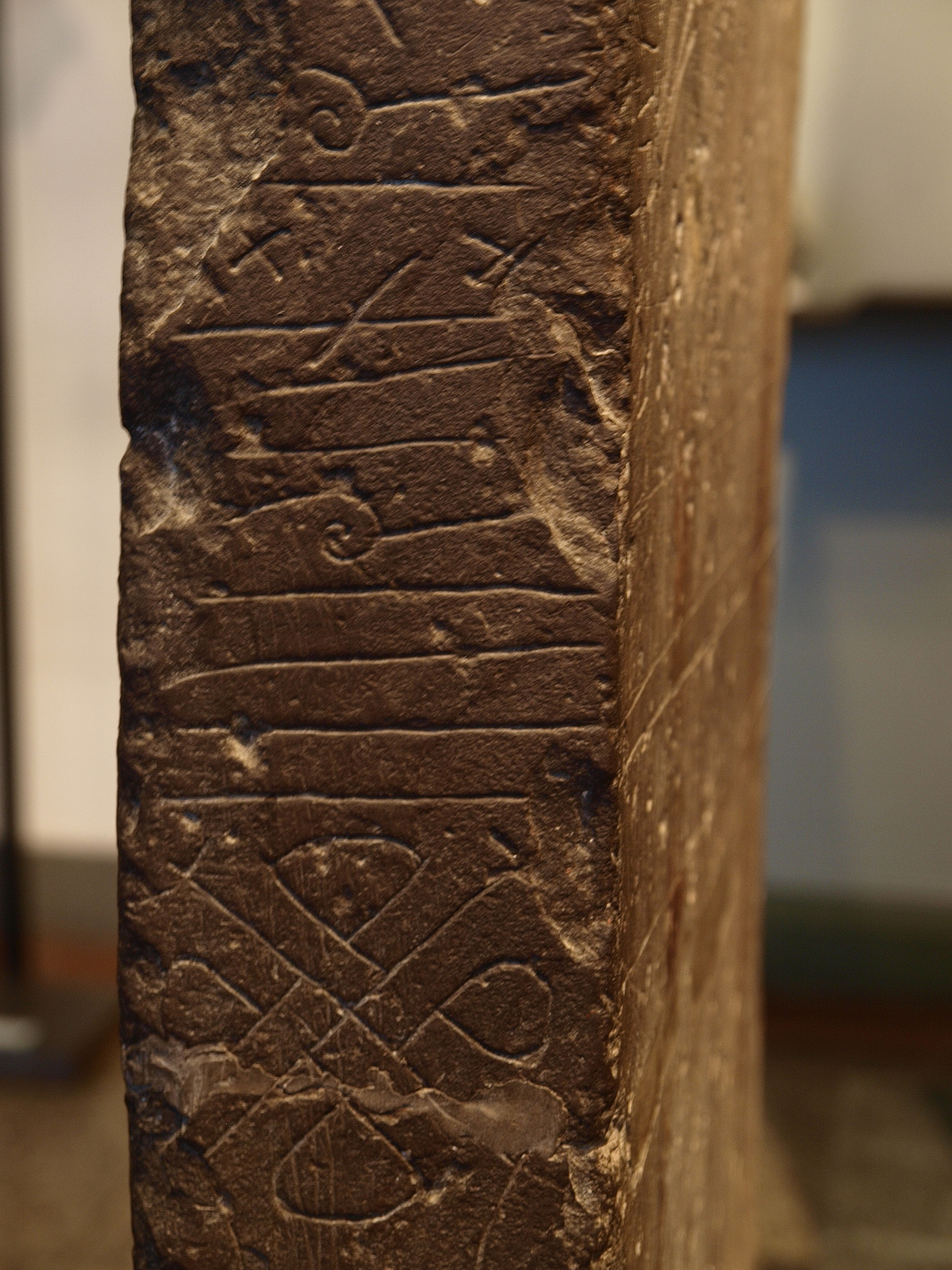
Detail of the Alstad stone.

Traditionally, Ringerike referred to the area around the northern and northwestern part of Tyrifjord and the lowlands along the rivers Randselva, Ådalselva and Sokna, i.e. the municipalities of Hole, Krødsherad, Modum, Ringerike, and Sigdal in Buskerud county.

Today, "Ringerike" may refer to solely Ringerike Municipality or to both Hole Municipality and Ringerike Municipality. Ringerike Municipality, Hole Municipality, and Jevnaker Municipality (in Akershus county), together form the Council for the Ringerike Region (Rådet for Ringeriksregionen),. The old Ringerike District Court used to be based in Ringerike as well.

Ringerike style, a historic Scandinavian animal style, was first discovered on runestones in Ringerike. One of these was the Alstad stone, a runestone found in 1913 on the farm Nedre Alstad in the nearby Østre Toten Municipality. Both Ulvøya and Ringerike are mentioned in the text.

Old Norse:

Jórunnr reisti stein þenna eptir 〈au-aun-〉er hana [á]tti,
ok fœrði af Hringaríki útan ór Ulfeyj[u].
Ok myndasteinn [mæt]ir þessi.

English translation:

Jórunnr raised this stone in memory of
who owned her (i.e. was her husband),
and (she) brought (it) out of Hringaríki,
from Ulfey.
And the picture-stone venerates them.

The Dynna stone, a runestone from Hadeland, is of the same type of red sandstone typical for Ringerike.

=== Kings of Ringerike ===
Ringerike was founded by its eponymous ruler Hring, who was the son of Raum the Old. One of the more significant historic people who have lived in Ringerike, was the king Halfdan the Black, father of Harald Fairhair, who united Norway into a single kingdom. In the early Viking Age before Harald Fairhair became the first king of Norway, Ringerike was a petty kingdom. Dagling was a legendary clan of Ringerike.

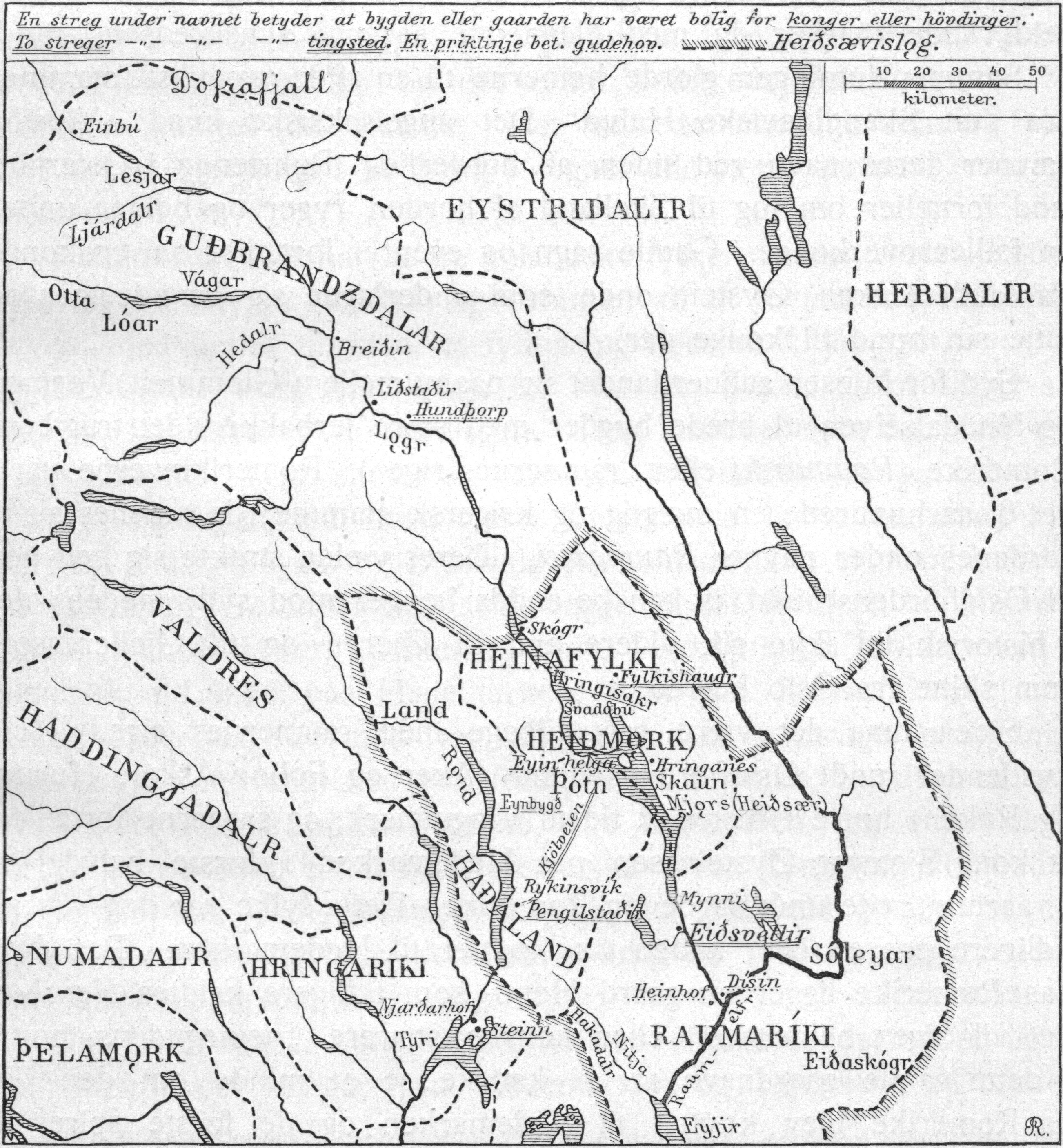
Map of the historical Uplands.

In the Ynglinga saga, Snorri Sturluson writes that the clan was descended from Dag the Great whose daughter Dageid married the Swedish king Alaric and was the mother of Yngvi and Alf, both legendary Swedish kings of the House of Yngling. One of the sons of Dag the Great was Óli, who was the father of Dag, Óleif, Hring (the old king Ring of Frithiof's Saga), Olaf, Helgi, and Sigurd Hjört, who was a petty king of Ringerike.

Sigurd Hjört was the father of Ragnhild Sigurdsdotter, the mother of Harald Fairhair. Following Harald's consolidation of Norway in the late 9th century, the kingdom appears to have been ruled by a series of local jarls and client kings. A later sub-king of Ringerike, Sigurd Syr, was the father of Harald Hardråde and the stepfather of Olav King Haraldson, the saint, both kings of Norway. When King Olaf Tryggvason came to Ringerike to spread the novel Roman Catholic religion of the new feudal empire of Charlemagne, Sigurd Syr and his wife allowed themselves to be baptized. Forced conversion to Christendom was a novelty, put into legal code by Charlemagne.

=== Administrative history ===
Ringerike was, in its beginnings, the southwesternmost district of the historical Uplands. In c. 1320, it was together with Hadeland, Land, and Toten, a part of the county (or syssel) Haðafylki. Ringerike was in c. 1640 grouped with Hallingdal in the district Buskerud og Hallingdal Fogderi. In 1866, the district was divided into the Buskerud district, which included Krødsherad Municipality, Modum Municipality, and Sigdal Municipality, along with Lower Buskerud, excluding Kongsberg Municipality. The rest of Ringerike remained the same as it commonly is today.

== Municipalities ==
Map	Name	Adm.center	Area km²	Language
Ringerike kommune	Ringerike Municipality	Hønefoss	1,555.10	Bokmål
Hole kommune	Hole Municipality	Vik	194.80	Bokmål
Sigdal kommune	Sigdal Municipality	Prestfoss	842.15	Bokmål
Krødsherad kommune	Krødsherad Municipality	Noresund	374.63	Neutral
Modum kommune	Modum Municipality	Vikersund	515.09	Bokmål
