= List of Vikings and Vikings: Valhalla characters =

Cast of Vikings in season 4, from left to right: Linus Roache (Ecbert), Jennie Jacques (Judith), Gustaf Skarsgård (Floki), James Quinn Markey (Ivar), Alyssa Sutherland (Aslaug), Travis Fimmel (Ragnar), Alexander Ludwig (Björn), Katheryn Winnick (Lagertha), Ben Robson (Kalf), Clive Standen (Rollo) and Morgane Polanski (Gisla)

Vikings is a historical drama television series written and created by Michael Hirst for the television channel History. Filmed in Ireland, it premiered on 3 March 2013 in Canada, concluding on December 30, 2020. A standalone sequel series, Vikings: Valhalla, written and created by Jeb Stuart for Netflix, premiered on February 25, 2022, concluding on July 11, 2024.

Vikings is inspired by the sagas of Viking Ragnar Lothbrok, one of the best-known legendary Norse heroes and notorious as the scourge of England and France, while Vikings: Valhalla, set 100 years later, chronicles the beginning of the end of the Viking Age and the adventures of Leif Erikson, his sister Freydís Eiríksdóttir and Harald Sigurdsson. The broad historical narrative of both series are based on real events, with some of the principal characters representing real figures from history and/or legend.

Vikings portrays Ragnar as a former farmer who rises to fame by successful raids into England, and eventually becomes king, with the support of his family and fellow warriors: his brother Rollo, his son Björn Ironside, and his wives—the shieldmaiden Lagertha and the princess Aslaug. Vikings: Valhalla portrays Leif and Freydís as immigrants from Greenland to Norway, who are respectively pulled into the Viking campaign to conquer Great Britain and the growing religious divide between Christians and Pagans. The Seer (portrayed by John Kavanagh) is the only character to appear in both series, having appeared in at least one episode of every season.

== Main characters ==
The following is a list of series regulars who have appeared in one or more of the six seasons of Vikings or the three seasons of Vikings: Valhalla. The characters are listed in the order they were first credited.

=== Cast table ===
= Main cast (credited)
= Recurring cast (3+)
= Guest cast (1-2)

Character	Actor	Vikings									Valhalla		
Character	Actor	1	2	3	4		5		6		1	2	3
Character	Actor	1	2	3	Part 1	Part 2	Part 1	Part 2	Part 1	Part 2	1	2	3
Ragnar Lothbrok	Travis Fimmel	Main	Main	Main	Main	Main							
Lagertha	Katheryn Winnick (Note: In the first part of season 5, Lagertha is also portrayed by guest child actress Mabel Hurley.)	Main	Main	Main	Main	Main	Main	Main	Main				
Rollo	Clive Standen	Main	Main	Main	Main	Main	Special appearances	Special appearances					
Siggy	Jessalyn Gilsig	Main	Main	Main									
Floki	Gustaf Skarsgård	Main	Main	Main	Main	Main	Main	Main		Main			
Earl Haraldson	Gabriel Byrne	Main											
Athelstan	George Blagden	Main	Main	Main	Recurring	Guest	Body double						
King Horik	Donal Logue	Main	Main										
Aslaug	Alyssa Sutherland	Main (Note: Sutherland only appears in one episode of season 1, although credited as a main cast member.)	Main	Main	Main	Main							
King Ecbert	Linus Roache		Main	Main	Main	Main	Body double	Body double					
Björn Ironside	Alexander Ludwig		Main (Note: Ludwig only appears in one episode of the second part of season 6, although credited as a main cast member.)	Main	Main	Main	Main	Main	Main	Main			
Björn Ironside	Nathan O'Toole (young)	Recurring	Guest		Guest	Guest							
Kalf	Ben Robson			Main	Main								
Harbard	Kevin Durand			Main	Main								
Charles	Lothaire Bluteau			Main	Main								
The Seer	John Kavanagh	Recurring	Recurring	Recurring	Main	Main	Main	Main	Main	Main	Guest	Guest	Guest
Harald Finehair	Peter Franzén				Main	Main	Main	Main	Main	Main			
Halfdan the Black	Jasper Pääkkönen				Main	Main	Main			Main (Note: Pääkkönen only appears in one episode of the second part of season 6, although credited as a main cast member.)			
Ivar the Boneless	Alex Høgh Andersen (Note: In seasons 2 and 3, Ivar the Boneless is portrayed by an uncredited infant actor. In the first part of season 4, Ivar the Boneless is portrayed by recurring child actor James Quinn Markey and guest actor Alex Høgh Andersen.)		Recurring	Recurring	Recurring	Main	Main	Main	Main	Main			
Hvitserk	Marco Ilsø (Note: In seasons 2 and 3, Hvitserk is portrayed by recurring infant actor Cathal O'Hallin. In the first part of season 4, Hvitserk is portrayed by recurring child actor Stephen Rockett and guest actor Marco Ilsø.)		Recurring	Recurring	Recurring	Main	Main	Main	Main	Main			
Sigurd Snake-in-the-Eye	David Lindström (Note: In seasons 2 and 3, Sigurd Snake-in-the-Eye is portrayed by an uncredited infant actor. In the first part of season 4, Sigurd Snake-in-the-Eye is portrayed by recurring child actor Elijah O'Sullivan and guest actor David Lindström.)		Recurring	Recurring	Recurring	Main	Body double						
Ubbe	Jordan Patrick Smith (Note: In seasons 2 and 3, Ubbe is portrayed by recurring infant actor Cormac Melia. In the first part of season 4, Ubbe is portrayed by recurring child actor Luke Shanahan and guest actor Jordan Patrick Smith.)		Recurring	Recurring	Recurring	Main	Main	Main	Main	Main			
Aethelwulf	Moe Dunford		Recurring	Recurring	Recurring	Main	Main						
Bishop Heahmund	Jonathan Rhys Meyers					Main (Note: Meyers only appears in one episode of the second part of season 4, although credited as a main cast member.)	Main	Main					
Oleg the Prophet	Danila Kozlovsky								Main	Main			
Erik	Eric Johnson								Main	Main			
Torvi	Georgia Hirst		Recurring	Recurring	Recurring	Recurring	Recurring	Recurring	Main (Note: Georgia Hirst is credited as a series regular from episode 6x09 onwards. From episode 6x01 to 6x08, she is credited as a guest star.)	Main			
Gunnhild	Ragga Ragnars							Recurring	Main (Note: Ragga Ragnars is credited as a series regular from episode 6x09 onwards. From episode 6x01 to 6x08, she is credited as a guest star.)	Main			
Othere	Ray Stevenson								Main (Note: Stevenson only appears in one episode of the first part of season 6, although credited as a main cast member.)	Main			
Leif Erikson	Sam Corlett										Main	Main	Main
Freydís Eiríksdóttir	Frida Gustavsson										Main	Main	Main
Harald Sigurdsson	Leo Suter										Main	Main	Main
King Canute the Great	Bradley Freegard										Main	Main	Main
Jarl Olaf Haraldsson	Jóhannes Haukur Jóhannesson										Main	Main	
Jarl Estrid Haakon	Caroline Henderson										Main		
Queen Emma	Laura Berlin										Main	Main	Main
Earl Godwin	David Oakes										Main	Main	Main

Cast notes

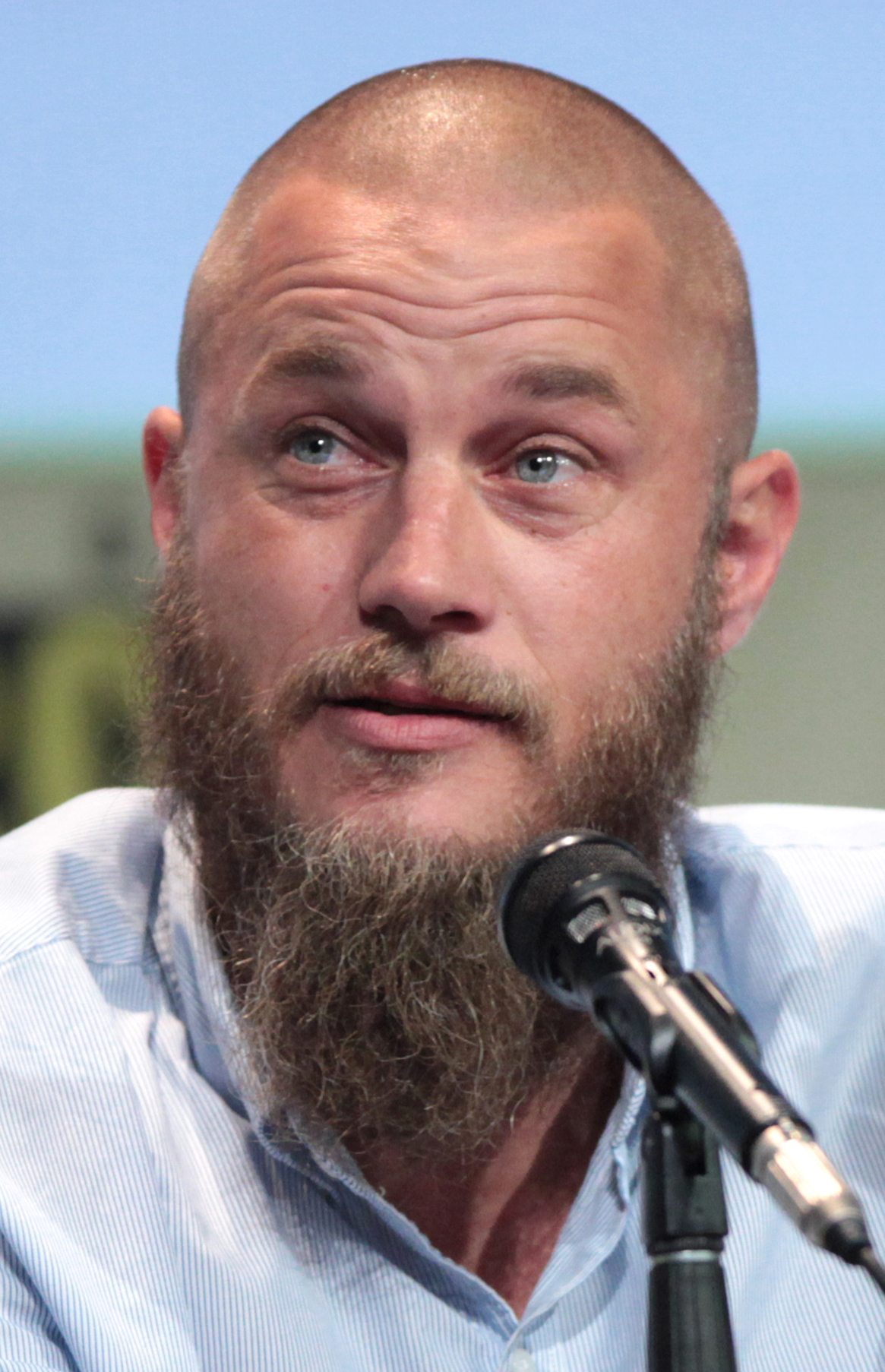
Travis Fimmel

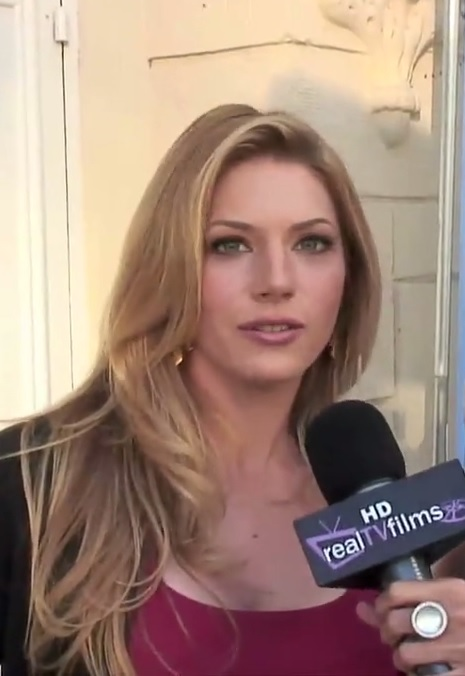
Katheryn Winnick

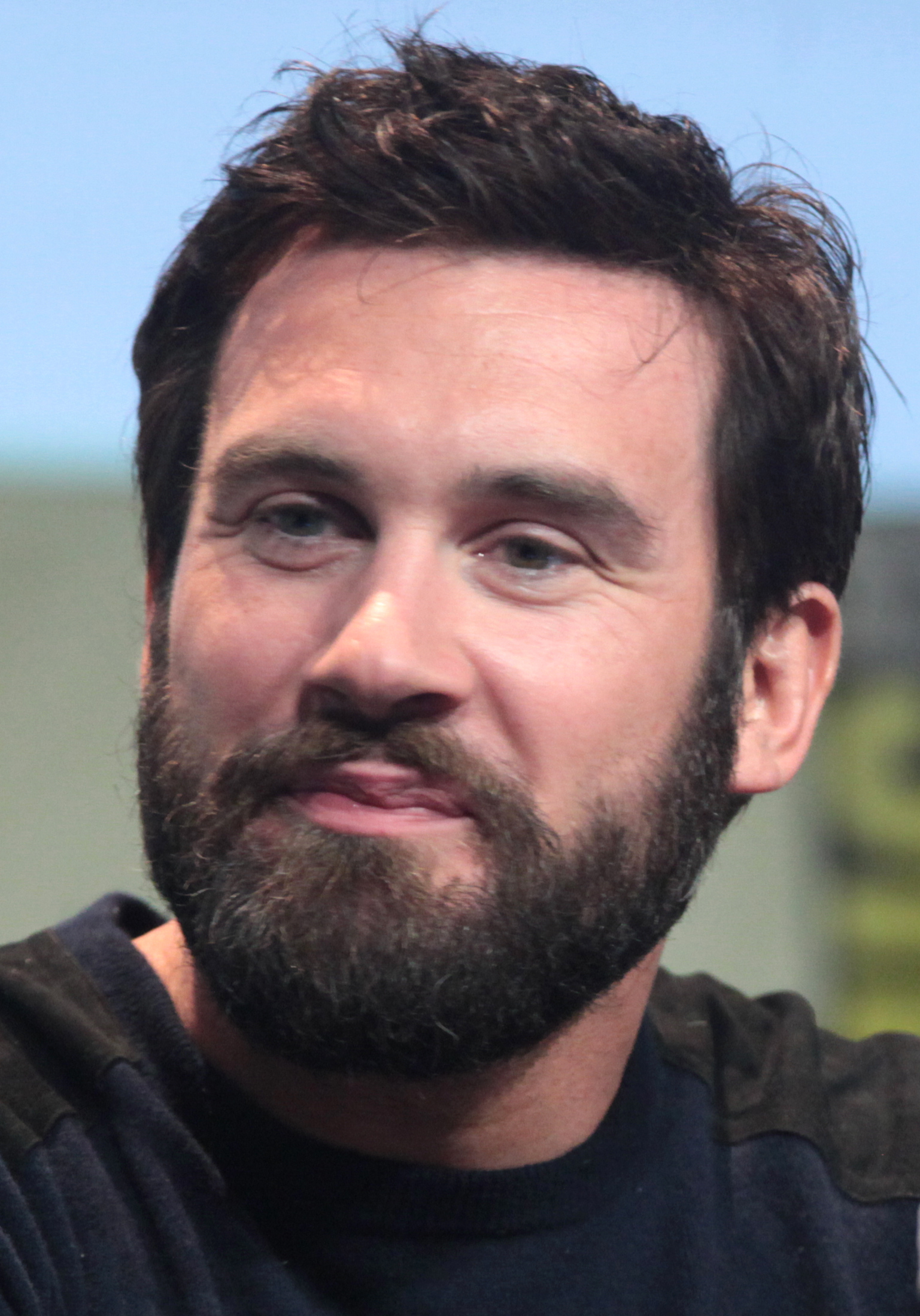
Clive Standen

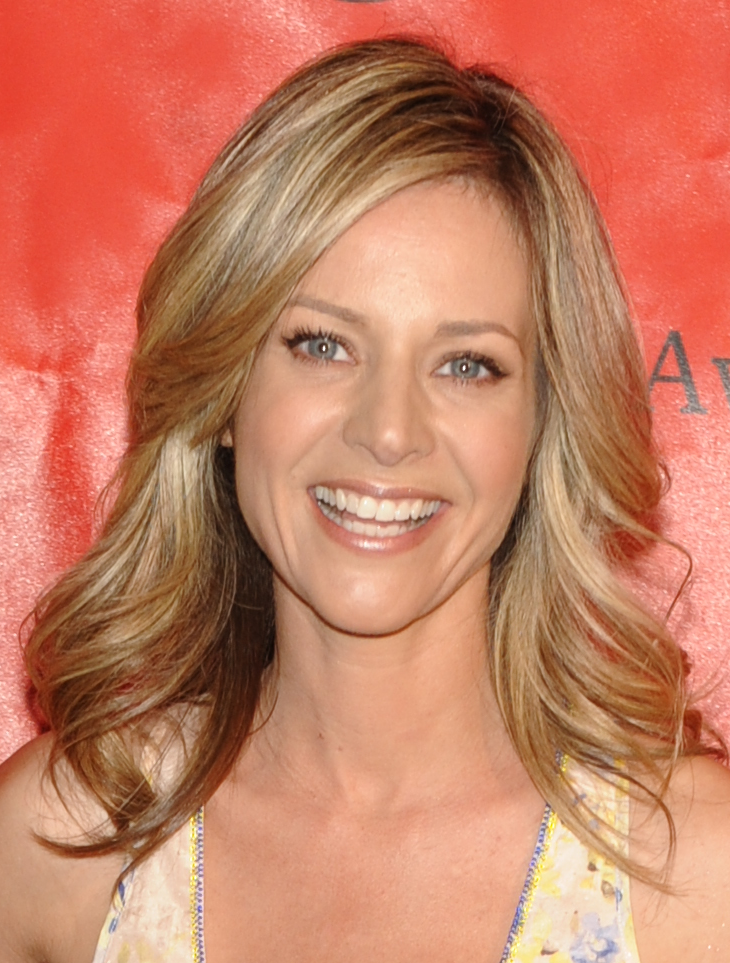
Jessalyn Gilsig

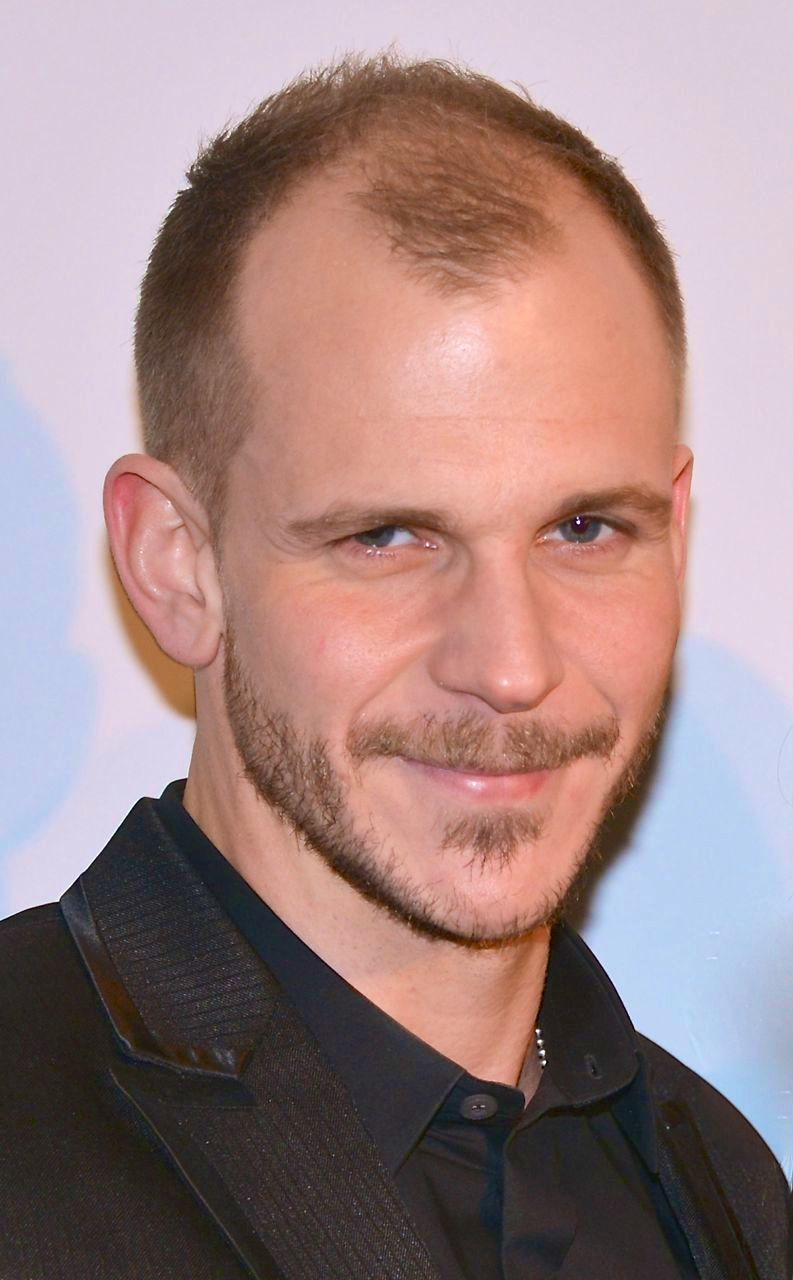
Gustaf Skarsgård

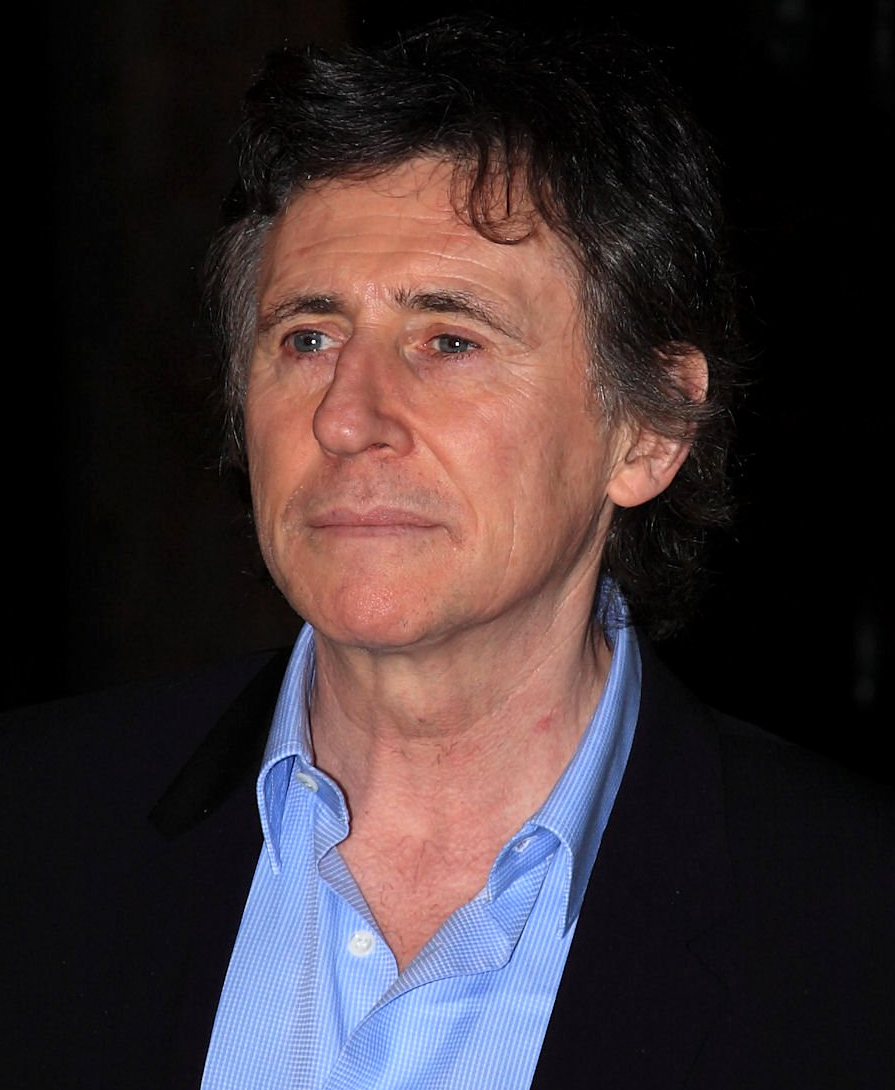
Gabriel Byrne

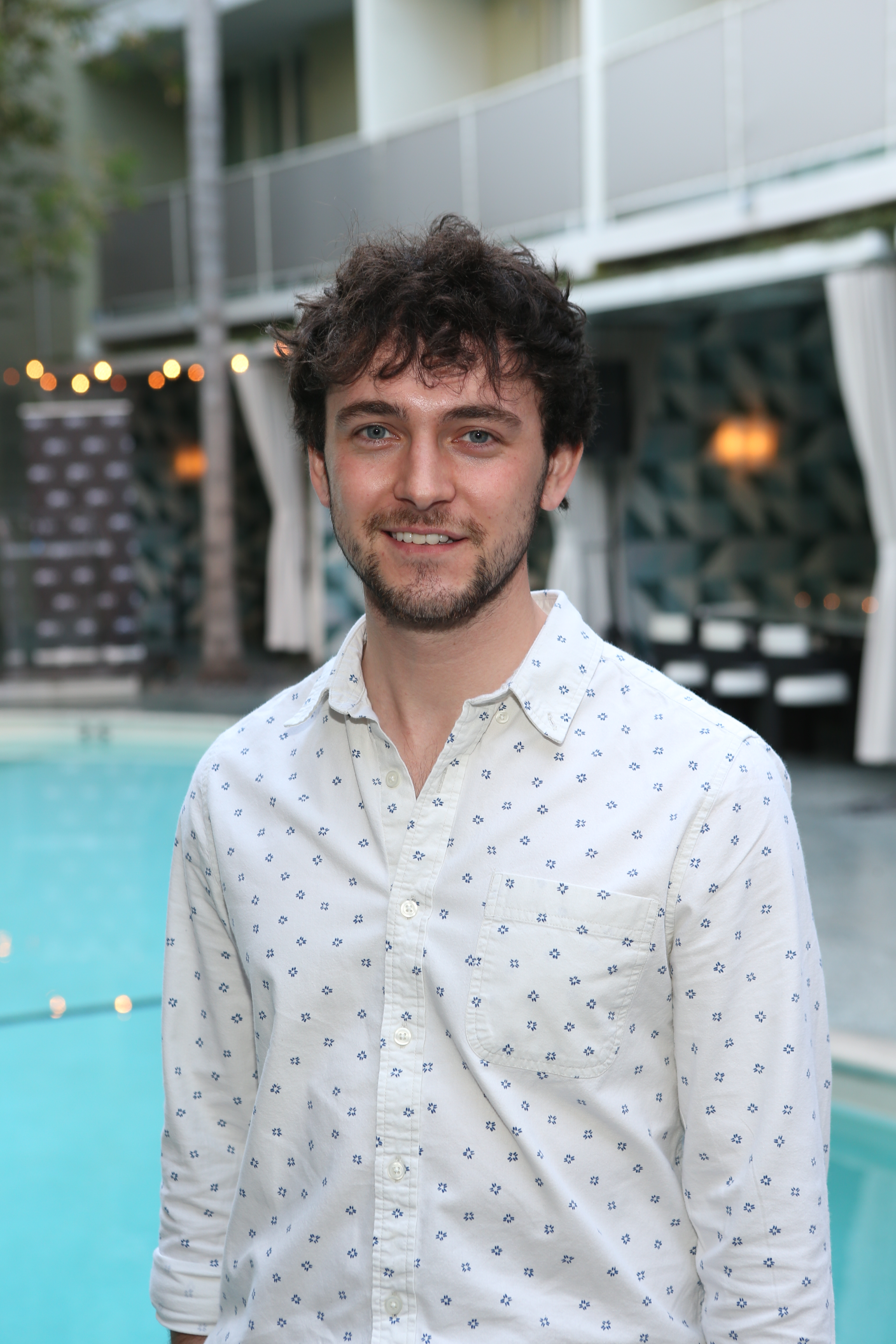
George Blagden

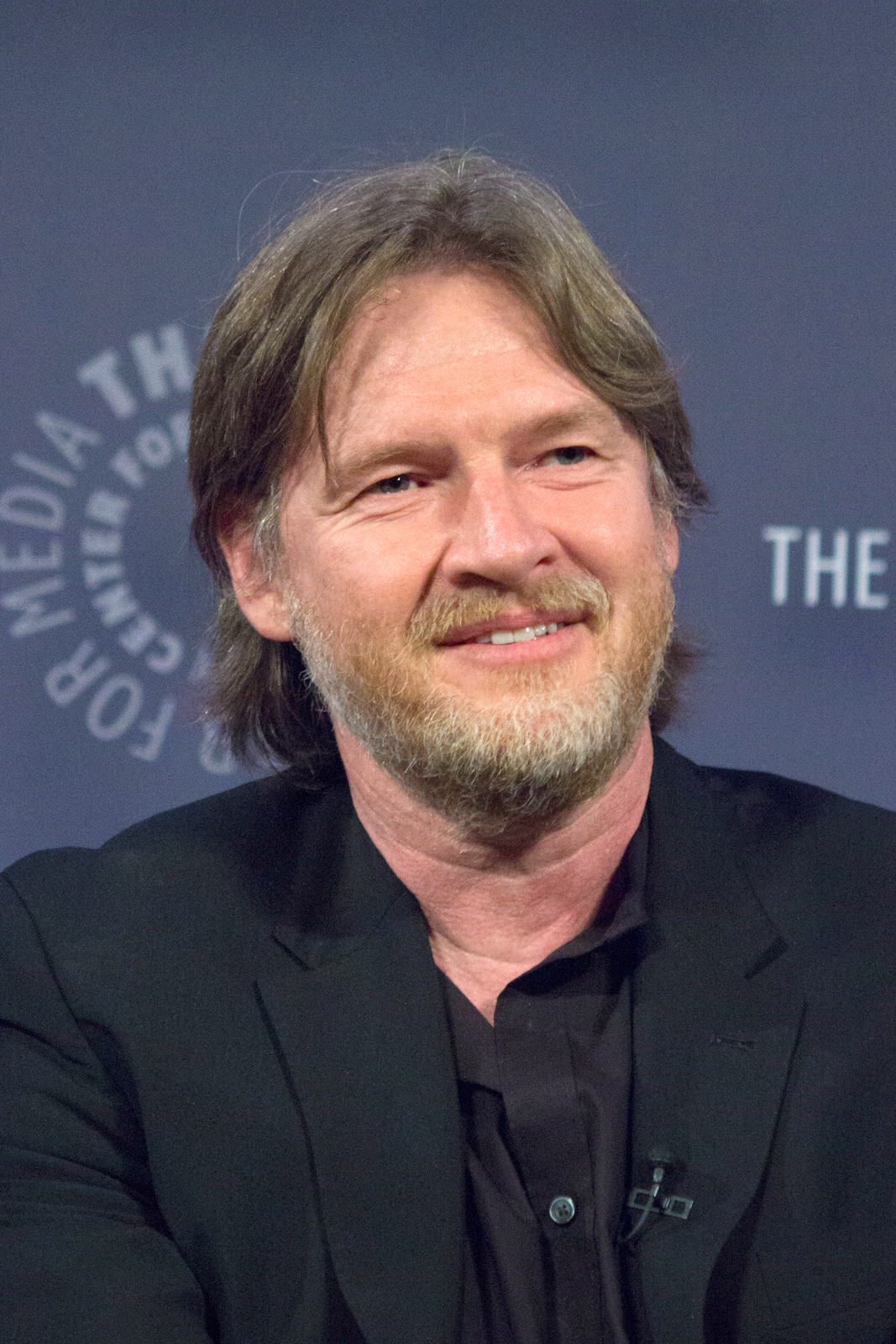
Donal Logue

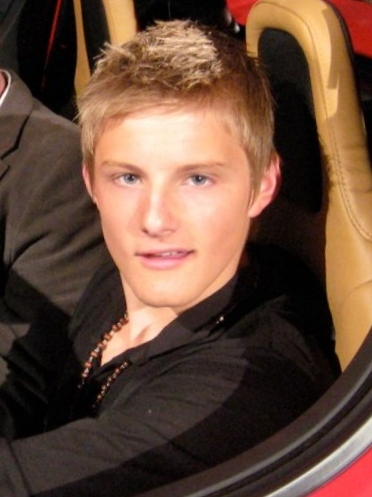
Alexander Ludwig

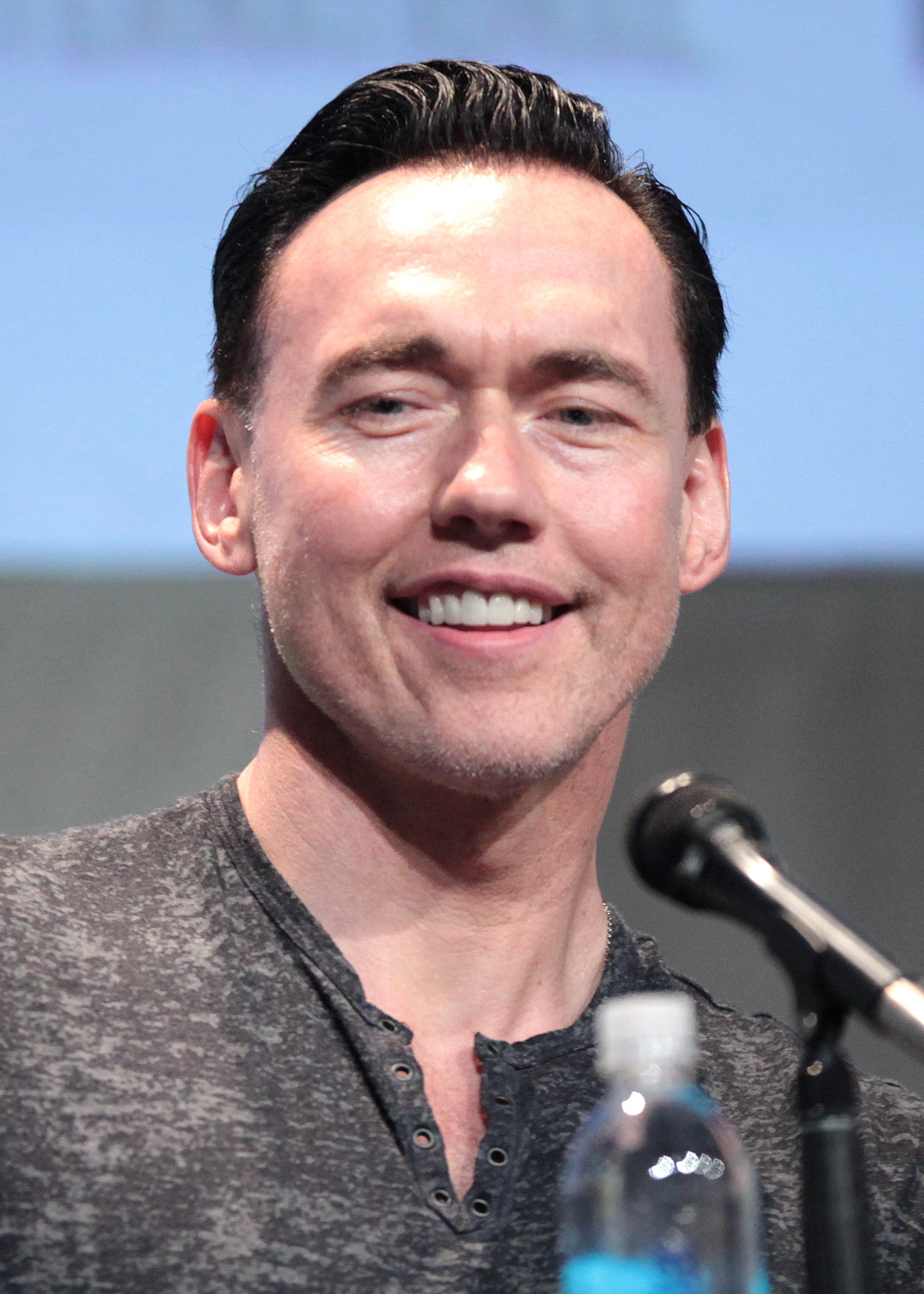
Kevin Durand

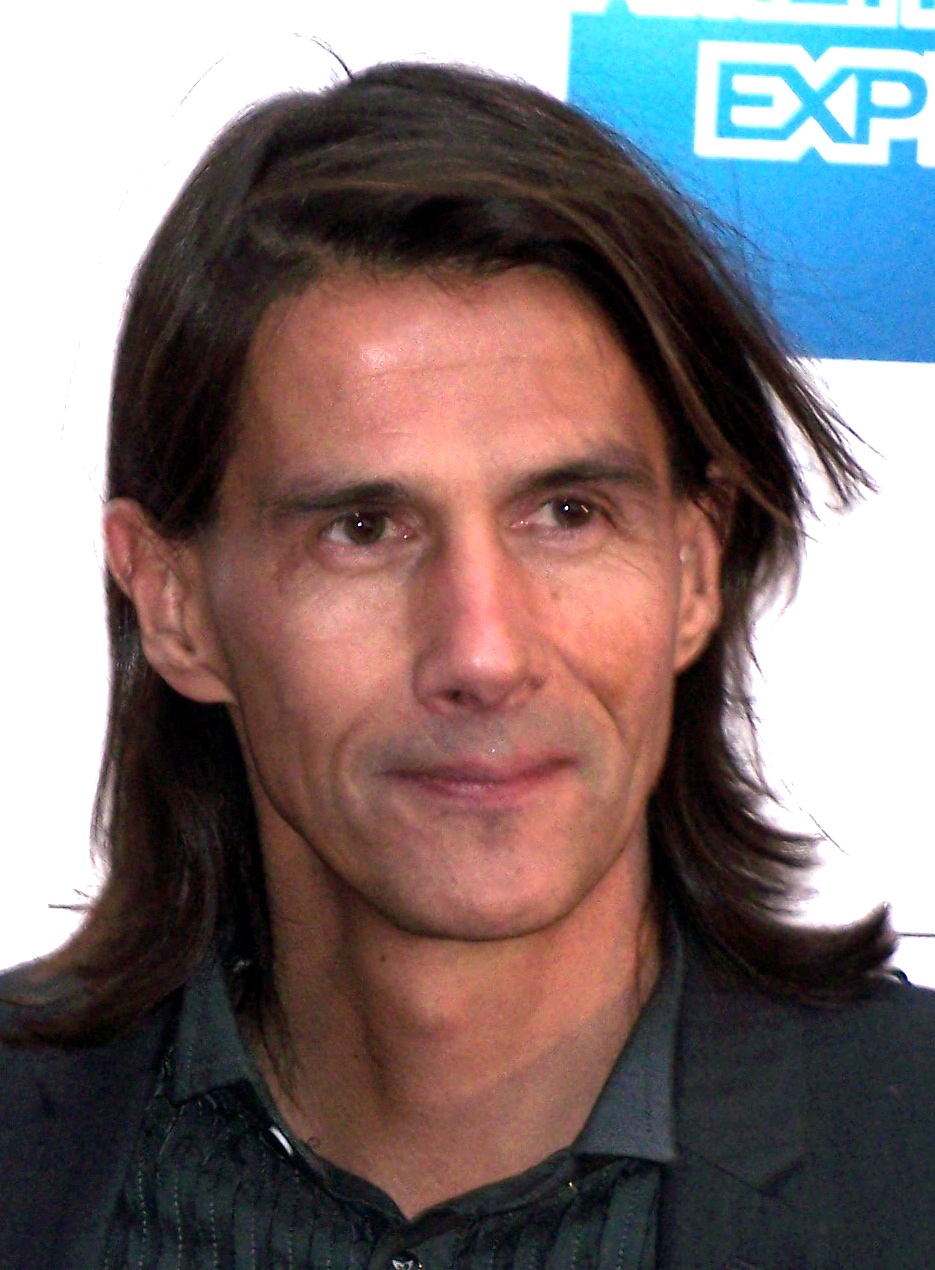
Lothaire Bluteau

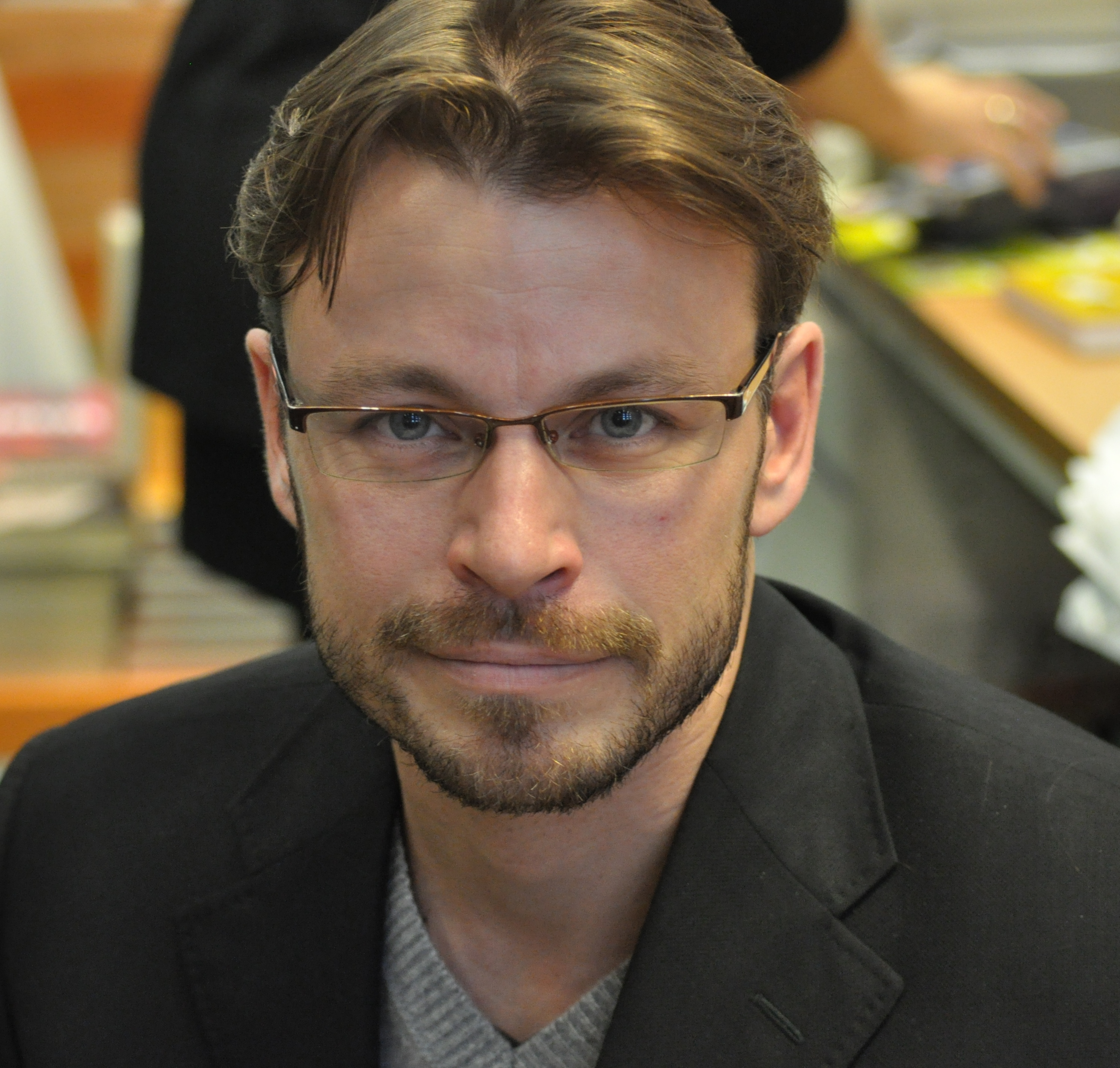
Peter Franzén

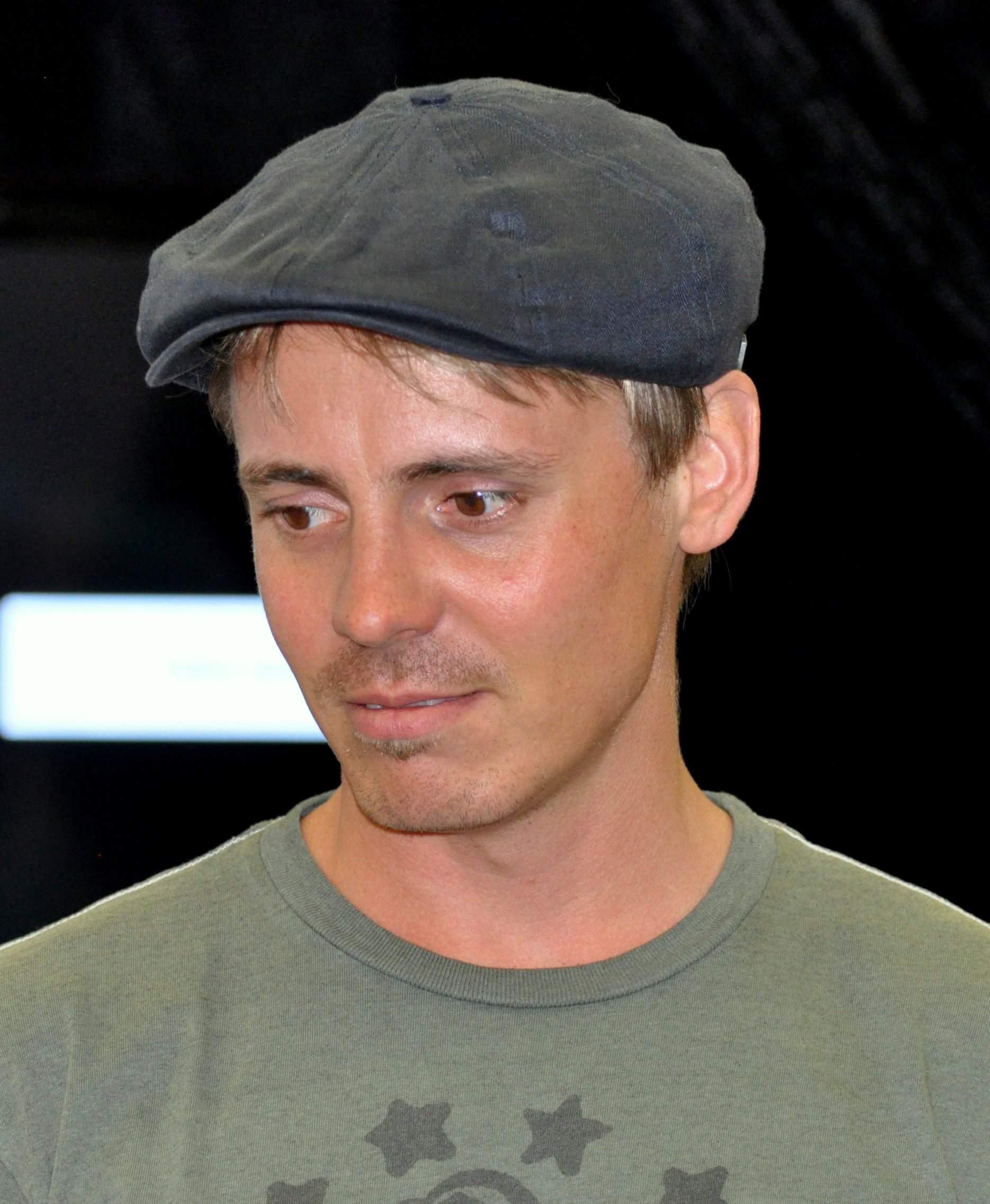
Jasper Pääkkönen

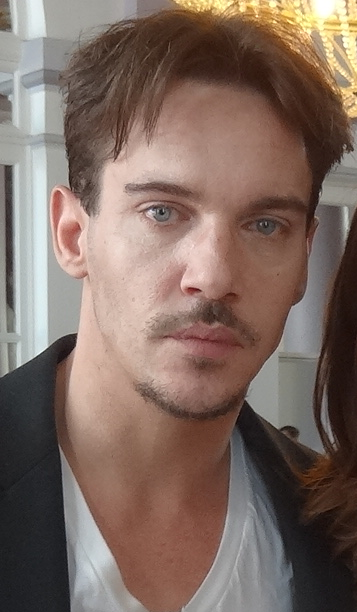
Jonathan Rhys Meyers

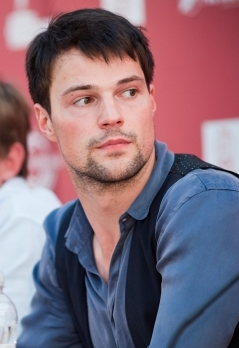
Danila Kozlovsky

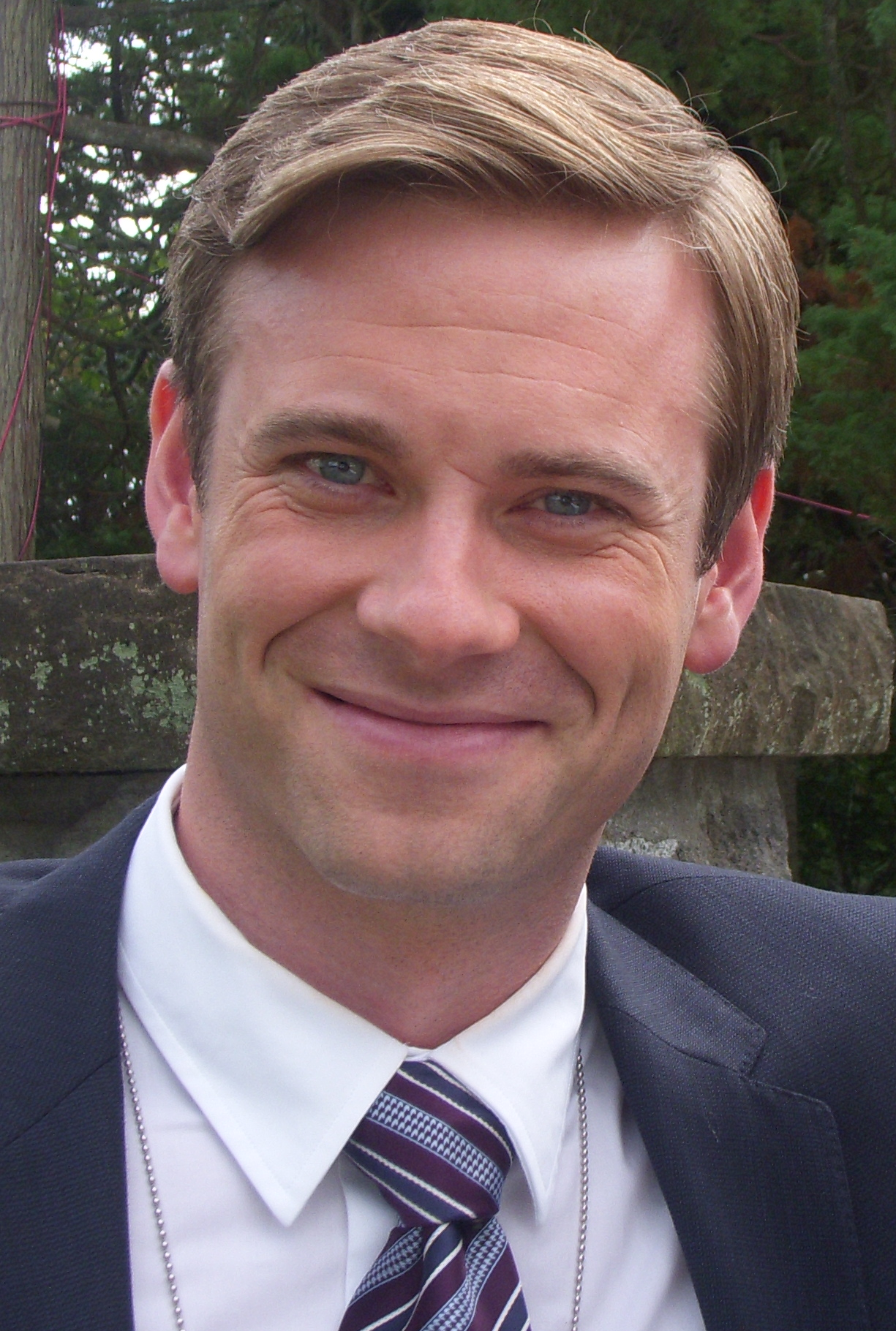
Eric Johnson

=== Vikings ===
==== Ragnar Lothbrok ====
- Played by Travis Fimmel (seasons 1–4)

Originally a farmer, Viking Ragnar Lothbrok claims to be descended from the god Odin. He becomes Earl of Kattegat after he challenges and kills the ruthless Earl Haraldson. He is also a feared warrior, becomes a raider of undiscovered lands, and, eventually, King of Denmark. Despite his reputation for ruthlessness and brutality, he is a curious man eager to learn about other cultures. Based on the semi-legendary Ragnar Lodbrok.

==== Lagertha ====
- Played by Katheryn Winnick (seasons 1–6) and Mabel Hurley (season 5)

Lagertha is Ragnar's first wife and a shieldmaiden. Following her separation from Ragnar, Lagertha rises to become Earl of Hedeby in her own right, going by the name Earl Ingstad. Following the deaths of Ragnar and Aslau.

==== Rollo ====
- Played by Clive Standen (seasons 1–5)

Ragnar's brother. A ruthless and skilled warrior, but his life in his brother's shadow makes Rollo's feelings towards Ragnar change from love and admiration to hateful jealousy. Eventually, he defects to the Franks and is made Duke of Normandy. Based on the historical Rollo.

==== Siggy ====
- Played by Jessalyn Gilsig (seasons 1–3)

Earl Haraldson's wife, and later the lover of Rollo. She possesses a strategic mind and an urge to regain her power and influence, but grows to care for Ragnar and his family. She drowns while attempting to save Ragnar's children from a similar fate as her own.

==== Floki ====
- Played by Gustaf Skarsgård (seasons 1–6)

A gifted but eccentric shipbuilder and friend of Ragnar. His ships create a revolution in shipwright techniques. He considers himself descended from the trickster god Loki and is very devout in the Norse religion. Loosely based on the historical Hrafna-Flóki Vilgerðarson.

==== Earl Haraldson ====
- Played by Gabriel Byrne (season 1)

Ragnar's predecessor as Earl of Kattegat and husband of Siggy. He grows to resent Ragnar's ambitions to raid the West, and sees Ragnar's growing popularity as a threat. He is killed by Ragnar during personal combat.

==== Athelstan ====
- Played by George Blagden (seasons 1–4)

An Anglo-Saxon monk from the monastery of Lindisfarne in Northumbria. Captured by Ragnar on his first raid, Athelstan grows to appreciate Viking culture and thus is constantly torn between the customs of Christian England and the pagan ways of Scandinavia. Athelstan becomes a confidant of King Ecbert after he is captured by his army.

==== King Horik of Denmark ====
- Played by Donal Logue (seasons 1–2)

A powerful king in Denmark who ends up being overthrown by Ragnar. Based on the historical Horik I.

==== Aslaug ====
- Played by Alyssa Sutherland (seasons 1–4)

Ragnar's second wife, claiming to be the daughter of the shieldmaiden and valkyrie Brynhildr and the dragonslayer Sigurd. When Ragnar becomes King of Kattegat, she becomes its queen. She is killed and usurped by a vengeful Lagertha. Based on the legendary Aslaug.

==== King Ecbert of Wessex ====
- Played by Linus Roache (seasons 2–4)

Ruler of the most powerful kingdom in England. He dreams of becoming Bretwalda and becomes an unlikely friend of Ragnar. Based on the historical Egbert of Wessex.

==== Björn Ironside ====
- Played by Nathan O'Toole (seasons 1–2, 4) and Alexander Ludwig (seasons 2–6)

Ragnar and Lagertha's son, given his epithet by his father after his first battle with the Saxons. Based on the historical Björn Ironside.

==== Kalf ====
- Played by Ben Robson (seasons 3–4)

A prominent and ambitious Hedeby villager who later betrays Lagertha and takes her earldom.

==== Harbard ====
- Played by Kevin Durand (seasons 3–4)

A charismatic wanderer and storyteller who visits Kattegat.

==== Emperor Charles of West Francia ====
- Played by Lothaire Bluteau (seasons 3–4)

Ruler in Paris, he witnesses Ragnar's attack on the city and later employs Rollo as a defender against Viking raids. Charles is a composite character drawing from the historical Charles the Bald (grandson of Charlemagne who first defended Paris from the Vikings), Charles the Fat (who commanded Odo) and Charles the Simple (who encountered Rollo, and may have had a daughter Gisela).

==== The Seer ====
- Played by John Kavanagh (seasons 1–6; Valhalla)

Seiðr of Kattegat. A 200-year-old blind being who often provides mysterious predictions to the characters. He is murdered by Ivar after refusing to recognise Ivar as a god and predicting Ivar's fall. In Valhalla, the Seer returns as a spirit guide, who appears to Freydís Eiríksdóttir and Jarl Gorm throughout their lives.

==== King Harald Finehair ====
- Played by Peter Franzén (seasons 4–6)

The ambitious king of Vestfold, who seeks to become king of all Norway and marry Ellisif. He allies with Ragnar during his second raid on Paris. He then conquers his neighbours' lands. He joins the Great Heathen Army and battles Aella and Aethelwulf. He fails to conquer Kattegat. He discovers Ellisif is married, and murders her husband, and then kidnaps and marries Astrid. She is killed in battle and he vows vengeance on Lagertha. He sails with Bjorn to retake Kattegat, but their fleet is damaged by a storm. Harald saves Bjorn's life but takes a serious battle wound. Olaf rescues Harald, but occupies Vestfold. Harald's men beg Bjorn for help, and Bjorn repays his debt. When Olaf tries to have Bjorn elected as over-king of Norway, Harald defeats Bjorn in the election, but Harald's men fail to kill Bjorn. Olaf refuses to recognise Harald, so Harald has him put away and sends warriors to secure his borders.

Based on the historical Harald Fairhair.

==== Halfdan the Black ====
- Played by Jasper Pääkkönen (seasons 4–6)

Harald's violent younger brother. He hates Christians and tries to kill as many as possible. He grows tired of living in his brother's shadow and of Harald's war with other Norsemen, and joins Bjorn's expedition to the Mediterranean. They form a close friendship which leads Halfdan to join Lagertha's side when Ivar and Harald declare war. Faced by Harald in battle, he is killed. A composite character of the historical Hastein and historical Halfdan the Black, the father of Harald Fairhair.

==== Ivar the Boneless ====
- Played by an uncredited infant actor (seasons 2–3), James Quinn Markey (season 4) and Alex Høgh Andersen (seasons 4–6)

Ragnar and Aslaug's fourth and most violent son. A birth defect has rendered his legs useless and left him impotent. Ivar is more unstable than his brothers, sadistic and seemingly narcissistic. While publicly boastful, he is insecure and feels unloved except by his mother Aslaug. When Lagertha kills Aslaug, Ivar vows vengeance and with the help of Harald and Rollo makes himself king of Kattegat. He is married to his former slave Freydis, who manipulates him. Based on the historical Ivar the Boneless.

==== Hvitserk ====
- Played by Cathal O'Hallin (seasons 2–3), Stephen Rockett (season 4) and Marco Ilsø (seasons 4–6)

Ragnar and Aslaug's second son. He enjoys battle and adventure and sides with his younger brother Ivar when Ivar and Ubbe fall out. As Ivar's megalomania increases and Ivar becomes more abusive of him, Hvitserk starts to question his decision. A composite of the semi-historical or legendary Hvitserk, the historical Halfdan Ragnarsson and the historical warlord Guthrum.

==== Sigurd Snake-in-the-Eye ====
- Played by an uncredited infant actor (seasons 2–3), Elijah O'Sullivan (season 4) and David Lindström (season 4)

Ragnar and Aslaug's third son. Killed by his brother Ivar after years of bullying. Based on the historical Sigurd Snake-in-the-Eye.

==== Ubbe ====
- Played by Cormac Melia (seasons 2–3), Luke Shanahan (season 4) and Jordan Patrick Smith (seasons 4–6)

Ragnar and Aslaug's first son. He is the most responsible of Aslaug's sons, and does not initially take part in raiding, preferring to stay and protect Kattegat. When his mother is killed, he wants revenge. However, as his previously warm relationship with Ivar turns hostile, he sides with Lagertha. When Lagertha is driven into exile in England, Ubbe becomes Alfred's advisor and converts to Christianity. Based on the historical Ubba.

==== Aethelwulf ====
- Played by Moe Dunford (seasons 2–5)

Son of King Ecbert. He is married to Princess Judith, with whom he has a son, Prince Aethelred. He dies by asphyxiation after being stung by a bee. Based on the historical Aethelwulf.

==== Bishop Heahmund ====
- Played by Jonathan Rhys Meyers (seasons 4–5)

A very religious warrior priest. Heahmund leads an army in resistance against the Norse presence in York, becoming a principal ally to Aethelwulf. He is eventually captured by Ivar who admires his skill as a warrior. Heahmund fights for Ivar against Lagertha, but is captured in the initial battle. Having become smitten by Lagertha, he seduces her and switches to her side. On his suggestion, Lagertha and her followers seek refuge in England. Through Heahmund's influence, the Northmen are given sanctuary in return for fighting against other Viking raiders. When Harald Finehair attempts to raid Wessex, Heahmund fights in the frontline. In the battle he is wounded by arrows and killed by Gunnhild. Broadly inspired by the historical Heahmund.

==== Oleg the Prophet ====
- Played by Danila Kozlovsky (season 6)

The Varangian (east European Viking) ruler of Kiev, called "the Prophet". He is the protector of the heir to the Rus kingdom, Igor and brother in law of Igor's father Rurik. Oleg is sadistic and uses his status as Igor's protector as a pretext for consolidating control over the kingdom. He has successfully sacked Constantinople, but is critical of Rurik's eastward expansion. Oleg wants to conquer Scandinavia which he claims is the property of the Rus. Oleg takes in Ivar, thinking him useful for his plan to invade Scandinavia. Oleg forms an uneasy friendship with Ivar after revealing that he murdered his wife after discovering her infidelity. Ivar's similar experience with Freydis brings them closer. The character is based on the semi-historical Oleg the Prophet.

==== Erik ====
- Played by Eric Johnson (season 6)

An outlaw who helps Bjorn and later Harald. He later becomes the King of Kattegat in Harald's absence alongside Queen Ingrid but she

==== Torvi ====
- Played by Georgia Hirst (seasons 2–6)

Wife of Jarl Borg, then the wife of Erlendur, later the wife of Bjorn and eventually, the wife of Ubbe. Initially a timid girl, she rises to become a shieldmaiden under Lagertha.

==== Gunnhild ====
- Played by Ragga Ragnars (seasons 5–6)

Jarl Olavsonn's wife. Harald becomes enamored with her, but after Olavsonn's death, she marries Bjorn instead. As his wife, she becomes queen of Kattegat. She is based on the quasi-historical Gunnhild.

==== Othere ====
- Played by Ray Stevenson (season 6)

A wanderer living in Iceland. His real name is Athelstan and he was a monk in England. During his travels as a missionary, he took the identity of the dying wanderer Othere and moved to Iceland. He then sailed west and glimpsed the Golden Land. Ubbe asks him to sail again with him to find the new land.

=== Vikings: Valhalla ===
==== Leif Erikson ====
- Played by Sam Corlett

Originally an explorer from Greenland, Leif was the son of Erik the Red, the founder of the first Norse settlement in Greenland, and Thjodhild of Iceland. Based on the legendary Leif Erikson.

==== Freydís Eiríksdóttir ====
- Played by Frida Gustavsson

Freydís is the daughter of Erik the Red, and the sister of Leif Erikson. She is portrayed as a masculine, strong-willed woman who would defy the odds of her society.

==== Harald Sigurdsson ====
- Played by Leo Suter

Great-grandson of Harald Fairhair and the younger brother of Olaf Haraldson, Harald was ambitious and sought to become king of all Norway someday. He allies with Canute during his raid on England. Based on the historical Harald Hardrada.

==== King Canute the Great ====
- Played by Bradley Freegard

King Canute is the powerful King of Denmark and Norway. Based on the historical Cnut.

==== Jarl Olaf Haraldsson ====
- Played by Jóhannes Haukur Jóhannesson

Older brother of Harald, son of Harald Grenske and great-grandson of Harald Fairhair. Olaf dreams of becoming King of Norway, usurping Danish rule, and rooting out paganism. Based on the historical Olaf II of Norway.

==== Jarl Estrid Haakon ====
- Played by Caroline Henderson (season 1)

Haakon was the Jarl of Kattegat, as a vassal under King Canute. Her husband was killed by Christians. Her grandmother was a Nubian noblewoman Haakon's grandfather had met in Alexandria. She was killed during the attack by Jarl Kåre. Inspired by the historical Haakon Ericsson.

==== Queen Emma ====
- Played by Laura Berlin

A descendant of Rollo, who became the English queen through her marriages to the Anglo-Saxon king Æthelred the Unready and later King Canute. Based on the historical Emma of Normandy.

==== Earl Godwin ====
- Played by David Oakes

Godwin, the son of a disgraced ealdorman, became one of the most trusted advisors of King Æthelred the Unready of England by delivering him something none of his peers could: the truth. Following Aethelred's death, he serves as an advisor to young King Edmund until the Vikings overrun London following which he becomes an advisor to King Canute. Based on historical Godwin, Earl of Wessex.

== Recurring characters ==
The following is a list of recurring characters, listed in the order that they first appeared on the show.

=== Cast table ===
= Main cast (credited)
= Recurring cast (3+)
= Guest cast (1-2)

Character	Actor	Vikings									Valhalla		
Character	Actor	1	2	3	4		5		6		1	2	3
Character	Actor	1	2	3	Part 1	Part 2	Part 1	Part 2	Part 1	Part 2	1	2	3
Svein	David Pearse	Recurring											
Gyda	Ruby O'Leary	Recurring			Guest	Guest							
Erik	Vladimir Kulich	Recurring											
Leif	Diarmaid Murtagh	Recurring											
Arne	Tadhg Murphy	Recurring	Guest										
Torstein	Jefferson Hall	Recurring	Recurring	Recurring									
King Aelle	Ivan Kaye	Recurring	Guest	Guest	Recurring	Recurring							
Thyri	Elinor Crawley	Recurring		Guest									
Helga	Maude Hirst	Recurring	Recurring	Recurring	Recurring	Recurring							
Elisef	Carrie Crowley	Guest	Recurring										
Rafarta	Donna Dent	Guest					Recurring	Recurring					
Queen Ealhswith	Cathy White	Guest	Guest			Guest							
Jarl Borg	Thorbjørn Harr	Guest	Recurring										
Erlendur	Edvin Endre		Recurring	Recurring	Recurring								
Earl Sigvard	Morten Suurballe		Recurring										
Bishop Edmund	Philip O'Sullivan		Recurring	Recurring	Recurring	Guest							
Þorunn	Gaia Weiss		Recurring	Recurring									
Judith	Jennie Jacques (Note: In season 2, Judith is portrayed by recurring actress Sarah Greene.)		Recurring	Recurring	Recurring	Recurring	Recurring	Recurring					
Einar	Steve Wall		Guest	Recurring	Guest								
Kwenthrith	Amy Bailey		Guest	Recurring	Recurring								
Angrboda	Rosalie Connerty (Note: In seasons 2 and 3, Angrboda is portrayed by an uncredited infant actress.)		Guest	Recurring	Guest								
Burgred	Aaron Monaghan			Recurring									
Earl Siegfried	Greg Orvis			Recurring									
Sinric	Frankie McCafferty			Recurring	Guest		Recurring						
Alfred	Ferdia Walsh-Peelo (Note: In season 3, Alfred is portrayed by an uncredited infant actor. In the first part of season 4, Alfred is portrayed by recurring infant actor Conor O'Hanlon. In the second part of season 4, Alfred is portrayed by recurring child actor Isaac O'Sullivan.)			Recurring	Recurring	Recurring	Recurring	Recurring		Recurring			
Odo	Owen Roe			Recurring	Recurring								
Gisla	Morgane Polanski			Recurring	Recurring	Guest							
Roland	Huw Parmenter			Recurring	Recurring								
Therese	Karen Hassan			Recurring	Recurring								
Aethelred	Darren Cahill (Note: In seasons 3 and 4, Aethelred is portrayed by an uncredited infant actor.)			Guest	Recurring	Recurring	Recurring	Recurring					
Guthrum	Ben Roe (Note: In season 3 and in the first part of season 4, Guthrum is portrayed by an uncredited infant actor. In the second part of season 4, Guthrum is portrayed by recurring child actor Anton Giltrap.)			Guest	Guest	Recurring	Recurring						
Magnus	Dean Ridge (Note: In season 3 and in the first part of season 4, Magnus is portrayed by an uncredited infant actor. In the second part of season 4, Magnus is portrayed by guest child actor Cameron Hogan.)			Guest	Recurring	Guest		Recurring					
Yidu	Dianne Doan				Recurring								
Prudentius	Seán Ó Meallaigh				Recurring								
Waerferth	Des Carney				Recurring								
Astrid	Josefin Asplund					Recurring	Recurring						
Margrethe	Ida Marie Nielsen					Recurring	Recurring	Guest					
Hali	Ryan Henson (Note: In the second part of season 4, Hali is portrayed by an uncredited infant actor.)					Recurring	Recurring	Recurring	Recurring				
Asa	Elodie Curry (Note: In the second part of season 4, Asa is portrayed by an uncredited infant actress. In season 5, Asa is portrayed by recurring child actress Svea Killoran.)					Recurring	Guest	Recurring	Recurring	Guest			
Tanaruz	Sinead Gormally					Recurring							
Lord Cyneheard	Malcolm Douglas					Guest	Guest	Recurring					
Lord Cuthred	Jonathan Delaney Tynan						Recurring	Guest					
White Hair	Kieran O'Reilly						Recurring	Guest	Recurring				
Kassia	Karima McAdams						Recurring						
Kjetill Flatnose	Adam Copeland						Recurring	Recurring	Recurring	Recurring			
Eyvind	Kris Holden-Ried						Recurring	Recurring					
Aud	Leah McNamara						Recurring	Recurring					
Helgi the Lean	Jack McEvoy						Recurring	Recurring					
Thorunn	Mei Bignall						Recurring	Recurring					
Ingvild	Kelly Campbell						Recurring	Recurring	Guest	Recurring			
Bul	James Craze						Recurring						
Asbjorn	Elijah Rowen						Recurring	Recurring					
Thorgrim	Rob Malone						Recurring						
Frodi	Scott Graham						Recurring	Recurring	Guest	Recurring			
Jorunn	Tallulah Belle Earley						Recurring	Recurring					
Svase	Anthony Brophy						Recurring						
Snaefrid	Dagny Backer Johnsen						Recurring						
Queen Freydis	Alicia Agneson						Guest	Recurring					
Princess Katia	Alicia Agneson								Recurring	Recurring			
Elsewith	Róisín Murphy							Recurring		Recurring			
Thora	Eve Connolly							Recurring	Recurring				
Lady Ethelfled	Ann Skelly							Recurring					
King Olaf the Stout	Steven Berkoff							Recurring	Recurring	Guest			
Amma	Kristy Dawn Dinsmore							Guest	Recurring	Guest			
Ingrid	Lucy Martin								Recurring	Recurring			
Ganbaatar	Andrei Claude								Recurring	Guest			
Prince Dir	Lenn Kudrjawizki								Recurring	Recurring			
Prince Igor	Oran Glynn O'Donovan								Recurring	Recurring			
Anna	Serena Kennedy								Recurring				
Anna	Isabelle Connolly									Guest			
King Hakon	Mishaël Lopes Cardozo								Recurring	Guest			
Runa	Gina Costigan								Recurring				
Gudrid	Noella Brennan									Recurring			
Naad	Ian Lloyd Anderson									Recurring			
Peminuit	Wesley French									Recurring			
We'jitu	Phillip Lewitski									Recurring			
Liv	Lujza Richter										Recurring	Guest	
Yrsa	Álfrún Laufeyjardóttir										Recurring		
Skarde	Edward Franklin										Recurring		
Njal	Gavan O'Connor-Duffy										Recurring		
Agnarr	Christopher Rygh										Recurring	Recurring	Recurring
Jarl Norí	Kenneth M. Christensen										Recurring		Guest
Arne Gormsson	Pääru Oja										Recurring		
Hallbjorn	James Ballanger										Recurring	Recurring	
Prince / King Edmund II	Louis Davison										Recurring		
Eadric Streona	Gavin Drea										Recurring		
Cyneheard, Earl of Kent	Alan Devine										Recurring		Guest
Wulfhere, Earl of Sussex	Mark Huberman										Recurring	Guest	Guest
Oswick, Earl of East Anglia	Gavin O'Connor										Recurring		Guest
Leofric, Earl of Northumbria	Martin Philips										Recurring		
Jarl Kåre	Asbjørn Krogh Nissen										Recurring		
Queen Ælfgifu	Pollyanna McIntosh										Recurring	Recurring	Recurring
King Sweyn Forkbeard	Søren Pilmark										Guest	Guest	Guest
Princess Gytha	Henessi Schmidt										Guest	Recurring	Recurring
Prince / King Svein Knutsson	Charlie O'Connor										Guest	Recurring	
Prince / King Svein Knutsson	Jakob Femerling Andersen												Recurring
Jorundr Torvilsson	Stanislav Callas											Recurring	
Ælfwynn	Maria Guiver											Recurring	
Hrefna	Emily Mcentire											Recurring	
Hrefna	Amalia Holm												Recurring
Valgerda	Aoibhinn McGinnity											Recurring	Recurring
Lord Hárekr	Bradley James											Recurring	
Lady Gudrid	Yngvild Støen Grotmol											Recurring	
Kolr	Patrick Loftus											Recurring	Guest
Grand Prince Yaroslav the Wise	Marcin Dorociński											Recurring	Guest
Mariam	Hayat Kamille											Recurring	
Batu	Taylor James											Recurring	Recurring
Kaysan	Kayode Akinyemi											Recurring	Recurring
Lord Vitomir	Steven Brand											Recurring	
Eleana / Empress Zoe	Sofya Lebedeva											Recurring	Recurring
Kurya	Tolga Safer											Recurring	
Gestr	Eigil Hedegaard											Recurring	
Brigtoc	Ailbe Cowley											Recurring	
Cadlín	Siobhán Callaghan											Recurring	
Dorn	Elaenor McLynn											Recurring	Recurring
Prince Harold Harefoot	Ruben Lawless										Guest	Guest	
Prince Harold Harefoot	Pyry Kähkönen												Recurring
Magnus Olafsson	Stefán Haukur Jóhannesson											Guest	
Magnus Olafsson	Set Sjöstrand												Recurring
Emperor Romanos III	Nikolai Kinski											Guest	Recurring
General Georgios Maniakes	Florian Munteanu												Recurring
Stígr	Leander Vyvey												Recurring
Harald Haraldsson	Luke Harmon												Recurring
Bishop Grimketel	Horatio James												Recurring
Dunstan	Peter Claffey												Recurring
Queen Katla	Kate Bratchyna												Recurring
Prince Edward	Cal O'Driscoll												Recurring
Prince Alfred	Henry Proctor												Recurring
Prince Harthacanute	Huey O'Meara												Recurring
Erik the Red	Goran Višnjić												Recurring
Hilde	Carrie Crowley												Recurring

Cast notes

=== Vikings ===
==== Svein ====
- Played by David Pearse (season 1)

A loyal henchman of Earl Haraldson. He is killed by Rollo, after Earl Haraldson's death.

==== Gyda ====
- Played by Ruby O'Leary (seasons 1 and 4)

Daughter of Ragnar and Lagertha. She dies in a plague. Loosely based on Ragnar's unnamed daughters.

==== Erik ====
- Played by Vladimir Kulich (season 1)

Elderly Viking and one of Ragnar's warriors. He has a wife, Elisef, and a son, Leif. He is an early supporter of Ragnar and is murdered by earl Haraldson.

==== Leif ====
- Played by Diarmaid Murtagh (season 1)

One of Ragnar's warriors and son of Erik and Elisef. He offers himself as a sacrifice at Uppsala.

==== Arne ====
- Played by Tadhg Murphy (seasons 1–2)

One of Ragnar's warriors; an archer with an eye patch. He is killed in battle by Rollo.

==== Torstein ====
- Played by Jefferson Hall (seasons 1–3)

One of Ragnar's warriors and closest friends. He makes a suicidal attack on the Mercians after having contracted gangrene and amputation of his arm prevents fail to stop the spread.

==== Elisef ====
- Played by Carrie Crowley (seasons 1–2)

Wife of Erik and the mother of Leif.

==== King Aelle of Northumbria ====
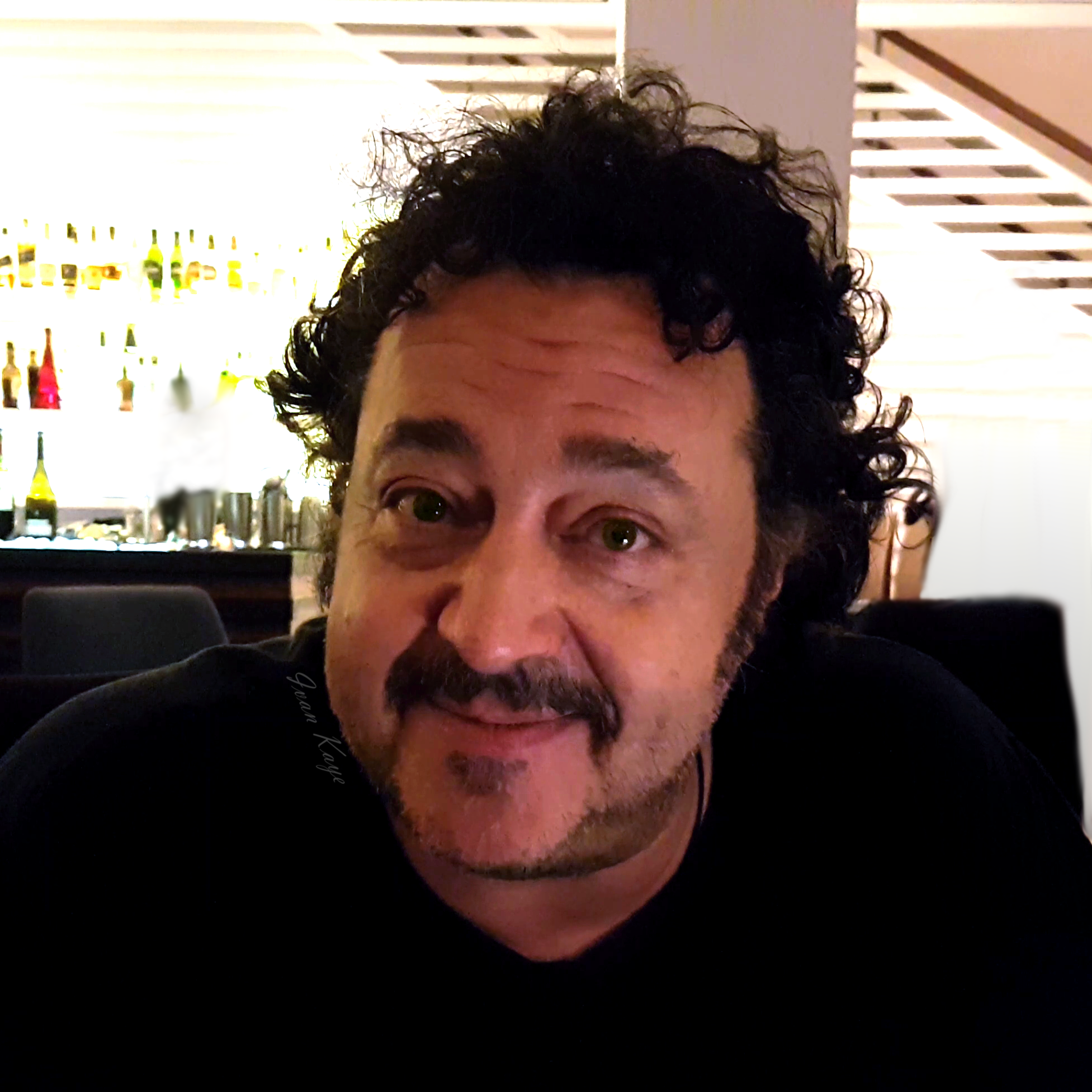
Ivan Kaye

- Played by Ivan Kaye (seasons 1–4)

Ruler of one of England's ancient kingdoms and the first to be attacked by Ragnar. Father of Princess Judith, Aethelwulf's wife, and grandfather of Princes Aethelred and Alfred. Based on the historical King Ælla of Northumbria. He killed Ragnar by throwing him into a pit of snakes and was executed by Bjorn as retribution for Ragnar's death.

==== Thyri ====
- Played by Elinor Crawley (seasons 1 and 3)

Daughter of Earl Haraldson and Siggy. She, along with Gyda, dies in a plague.

==== Helga ====
- Played by Maude Hirst (seasons 1–4)

Floki's long-suffering lover and wife. Murdered by her own adopted daughter who shortly after committed suicide.

==== Rafarta ====
- Played by Donna Dent (seasons 1, 5)

A woman of Kattegat and Eyvind's wife. She joins Floki's expedition to set up a colony. Her brother was killed by Kjetill's father Erik Tryggvason prior to the events of the series. She is killed by Kjetill.

==== Queen Ealhswith of Northumbria ====
- Played by Cathy Whyte (seasons 1–2, 4)

Wife of King Aelle and the mother of Princess Judith.

==== Jarl Borg ====
- Played by Thorbjørn Harr (seasons 1–2)

A powerful warlord of an earldom in Götaland. He has a wife, Torvi, and a son, Guthrum. He was killed by Ragnar with the Blood Eagle, for having attacked his people and his family.

==== Prince Erlendur ====
- Played by Edvin Endre (seasons 2–4)

King Horik's first son. He is cruel and spiteful. After the death of his father, he seeks vengeance against Ragnar and his family. He ends up marrying Torvi and conspires with Kalf to ruin Ragnar. He is killed by Torvi herself after frequently threatening Torvi's son Guthrum. Loosely based on the historical Horik II.

==== Earl Sigvard ====
- Played by Morten Suurballe (season 2)

Lagertha's second husband and Earl of Hedeby. He is killed by Lagertha after multiple incidents of abuse.

==== Bishop Edmund ====
- Played by Philip O'Sullivan (seasons 2–4)

An influential advisor at the court of King Ecbert. He is murdered by Hvitserk when the Great Heathen Army sacks Ecbert's villa. A composite character of the historical Eadmund of Winchester and the historical Edmund of East Anglia.

==== Þorunn ====
- Played by Gaia Weiss (seasons 2–3)

Bjorn's love interest and later first wife. Shortly after the birth of their daughter Siggy she leaves Bjorn.

==== Einar ====
- Played by Steve Wall (seasons 2–4)

A scheming troublemaker, and ally of Earl Sigvard of Hedeby. He later betrays Sigvard and helps Lagertha gain power in Hedeby. When Lagertha rejects his advances, he helps Kalf gain power in Hedeby. In the end, he is injured by Kalf and killed by Lagertha.

==== Judith ====
- Played by Sarah Greene (season 2) and Jennie Jacques (seasons 3–5)

Daughter of King Aelle and Queen Ealhswith of Northumbria and the wife of Aethelwulf. She has a legitimate son with Aethelwulf, Aethelred, and an illegitimate one with Athelstan, Alfred. Based on the historical Judith of Flanders.

==== Kwenthrith ====
- Played by Amy Bailey (seasons 2–4)

Contender to the throne of Mercia and later its Queen. She has a brother, Prince Burgred, and a putative illegitimate son with Ragnar, Magnus. She is stabbed by Judith after threatening to kill Ecbert. Based on the historical Cwenthryth.

==== Angrboda ====
- Played by an uncredited infant actress (seasons 2–3) and Rosalie Connerty (season 4)

Floki and Helga's daughter. She dies in childhood.

==== Prince Burgred ====
- Played by Aaron Monaghan (season 3)

The rebellious brother of Kwenthrith. Based on the historical Burgred of Mercia. He is poisoned by Kwenthrith who becomes Queen of Mercia.

==== Aethelred ====
- Played by an uncredited infant actor (seasons 3–4) and Darren Cahill (season 5)

Prince Aethelwulf and Princess Judith's son. Based on the historical Æthelred of Wessex.

==== Earl Siegfried ====
- Played by Greg Orvis (season 3)

A friend of Earl Kalf's and an ally to King Ragnar. He is killed at the Siege of Paris. Loosely based on the Norse chief Sigfred who took part in the Siege of Paris (885–86).

==== Sinric ====
- Played by Frankie McCafferty (seasons 3–5)

Sinric (Sindric from season 5 onwards) is a wanderer who taught Ragnar about England and Frankia, and who serves as a translator for the Northmen. Loosely based on the Norse chief Sinric who took part in the Siege of Paris (885–86).

==== Alfred ====
- Played by an uncredited infant actor (season 3), Conor O'Hanlon (season 4), Isaac O'Sullivan (season 4) and Ferdia Walsh-Peelo (seasons 5–6)

The son of Judith and Athelstan, and later the King of the Anglo-Saxons. Broadly based on the historical Alfred the Great.

==== Count Odo ====
- Played by Owen Roe (seasons 3–4)

In charge of defending the city from the Vikings. Based on the historical Odo of France. He is flogged to death by Roland on Emperor Charles's orders.

==== Princess Gisla ====
- Played by Morgane Polanski (seasons 3–4)

Daughter of Emperor Charles and later wedded to Duke Rollo. Based on the historical Gisela of France.

==== Roland ====
- Played by Huw Parmenter (seasons 3–4)

Count Odo's first-in-command. He has an incestuous relationship with his sister, Therese. He is assassinated with his sister by Emperor Charles's men.

==== Therese ====
- Played by Karen Hassan (seasons 3–4)

A noblewoman, Roland's sister, and Count Odo's mistress. She is assassinated with her brother by Emperor Charles's men.

==== Guthrum ====
- Played by an uncredited infant actor (seasons 3–4), Anton Giltrap (season 4) and Ben Roe (season 5)

Jarl Borg and Torvi's son. He is killed in battle by Hvitserk. Loosely based on the historical Danish warlord Guthrum

==== Magnus ====
- Played by an uncredited infant actor (seasons 3–4), Cameron Hogan (season 4) and Dean Ridge (season 5)

Ragnar and Kwenthrith's supposed illegitimate son. After spending his life as a hostage, he is evicted by Aethelwulf when Ragnar denies being his father. Magnus starts to consider himself a Viking, converts to the Norse religion, and joins Harald. He joins Bjorn and Hvitserk's siege of Kattegat but suffers a crisis of faith. Coming to terms with his new identity, he tries to scale the walls as the battle turns against Bjorn. Magnus is shot to death by White Hair, when he fails to protect himself with his shield. Loosely based on Bagsecg, who also invaded England in 870/71

==== Yidu ====
- Played by Dianne Doan (season 4)

Chinese slave brought after the siege of Paris who is bought by Queen Aslaug. She becomes protective of the sons of Ragnar and also forms a close bond with Ragnar, providing him with a drug and becoming his lover. Later she becomes distressed with the Viking way of life and tries to leave Ragnar. When she refuses to provide him with more of the drug and blackmails him, Ragnar drowns her.

==== Father Prudentius ====
- Played by Seán Ó Meallaigh (seasons 4)

Serves at the court of King Ecbert.

==== Waerferth the Scout ====
- Played by Des Carney (season 4)

One of King Ecbert's scouts. He is stabbed to death by Kwenthrith.

==== Astrid ====
- Played by Josefin Asplund (seasons 4–5)

Shieldmaiden and lover of Lagertha. She and Bjorn have a secret affair. She is kidnapped by Harald and marries him but grows to become fond of him. When attempting to warn Lagertha of an attack, she is raped by the whaler she tries to bribe. She falls pregnant and unsure if the baby is Harald's or her rapist's, induces Lagertha to kill her during battle, admitting that she was always her true love. After her death, Harald carries her earring around as remembrance and swears vengeance on Lagertha.

==== Margrethe ====
- Played by Ida Marie Nielsen (seasons 4–5)

One of Aslaug's slaves in Kattegat and the shared lover of Ubbe, Hvitserk and Sigurd. She is disturbed by Ivar and fears him. She is freed and marries Ubbe. Hvitserk remains her lover with Ubbe's consent. Ubbe eventually rejects her to marry Torvi, causing Margrethe to go insane. Hvitserk takes care of her, but when Ivar has a dream where Margrethe stabs him, he murders her using assassins.

==== Hali ====
- Played by an uncredited infant actor (season 4) and Ryan Henson (seasons 5–6)

Bjorn and Torvi's son. He is killed by White Hair.

==== Asa ====
- Played by an uncredited infant actor (season 4), Svea Killoran (season 5) and Elodie Curry (season 6)

Bjorn and Torvi's daughter. Falls overboard of a ship after seeing Jörmungandr and dies.

==== Tanaruz ====
- Played by Sinead Gormally (season 4)

An Arabized Berber orphan girl adopted by Helga. When Helga brings her to the sack of Ecbert's villa, Tanaruz snaps and stabs Helga and then kills herself.

==== Lord Cuthred ====
- Played by Jonathan Delaney Tynan (season 5)

A nobleman and member of the clergy of Wessex. After Bishop Heahmund is taken by the Vikings, Cuthred is appointed Bishop of Sherborne in place of Heahmund who is presumed dead. Heahmund later kills him for conspiring against him and Alfred.

==== White Hair ====
- Played by Kieran O'Reilly (seasons 5–6)

The leader of Ivar's bodyguards. After Ivar's defeat, he is outcast from Kattegat by King Bjorn. He turns to banditry and raids the village where Lagertha has retired, killing Bjorn's son Halli in such a raid. Lagertha leads the resistance and eventually kills White Hair in single combat.

==== Queen Freydis ====
- Played by Alicia Agneson (season 5)

Ivar's former slave and love interest. She becomes Queen of Kattegat by marrying Ivar. As Ivar is believed to be impotent, she has sex with a slave whom she later murders in order to produce a child. Freydis claims she conceived through magically consuming Ivar's blood. This and Freydis's sycophancy lead Ivar to declare himself a god. When the child is eventually born, it is deformed. This breaks Ivar's ego and he suspects Freydis has fooled him. Ivar leaves the child out to die, turning Freydis against him. She shows Hvitserk, Bjorn and Harald a secret way through the walls, allowing them to storm Kattegat. As the city falls, she admits what she has done and Ivar strangles her to death.

==== Kassia ====
- Played by Karima McAdams (season 5)

A Byzantine abbess. Loosely inspired by the historical Kassiani.

==== Kjetill Flatnose ====
- Played by Adam Copeland (seasons 5–6)

A violent and bold patriarch of a large family, the son of Eric Tryggvasson. He is chosen by Floki for an expedition to set up a colony. A composite charakter of the legendary Ketill Flatnose and the historical Erik the Red

==== Eyvind ====
- Played by Kris Holden-Ried (season 5)

A Viking of Kattegat who joins Floki's expedition. He becomes disillusioned in Iceland, and becomes antagonistic to Floki. His wife Rafarta's brother was killed by Kjetill's father, which makes him antagonistic to Kjetill. After his son Bul is accidentally killed by Thorgrim, Thorgrim is found drowned; Floki believes Eyvind is responsible. Eyvind's daughter in law Thorunn vanishes. Rafarta claims Thorunn was suicidal, which is disproved when Floki produces her body. Rafarta and Asbjorn are implicated as the murderers and Floki banishes Eyvind and his family. The family is ravaged by disease and weather and sends Helgi for help. Helgi brings back Floki, Kjetill and Frodi, along with several of Kjetill's farmhands. The farmhands capture Floki at knifepoint as Kjetill and Frodi murder Eyvind and all of his family.

==== Aud ====
- Played by Leah McNamara (season 5)

Kjetill Flatnose and Ingvild's daughter, who joins Floki's expedition to set up a colony. Something of a surrogate daughter to Floki, she tries to mend peace between the feuding clans of Kjetill and Eyvind. She kills herself in Iceland after finding out Kjetill and her brother Frodi murdered Eyvind and his family.

==== Helgi the Lean ====
- Played by Jack McEvoy (season 5)

Eyvind and Rafarta's son, who joins Floki's expedition to set up a colony. He is killed by Kjetill.

==== Thorunn (Kjetillsdóttir) ====
- Played by Mei Bignall (season 5)

Kjetill Flatnose and Ingvild's daughter and Helgi's wife, who joins Floki's expedition to set up a colony. She is killed by Asbjorn.

==== Ingvild ====
- Played by Kelly Campbell (seasons 5–6)

Kjetill Flatnose's wife, who joins Floki's expedition to set up a colony.

==== Bul ====
- Played by James Craze (season 5)

Eyvind and Rafarta's son, who joins Floki's expedition to set up a colony. He is killed by Thorgrim.

==== Asbjorn ====
- Played by Elijah Rowen (season 5)

Eyvind and Rafarta's son, who joins Floki's expedition to set up a colony. He is killed by Kjetill.

==== Thorgrim ====
- Played by Rob Malone (season 5)

Kjetill Flatnose and Ingvild's son, who joins Floki's expedition to set up a colony. He mysteriously drowns in Iceland.

==== Frodi ====
- Played by Scott Graham (seasons 5–6)

Kjetill Flatnose and Ingvild's son, who joins Floki's expedition to set up a colony. He assists Kjetill in massacring Eyvind and his family.

==== Jorunn ====
- Played by Tallulah Belle Earley (season 5)

Eyvind and Rafarta's daughter, who joins Floki's expedition to set up a colony. She is killed by Frodi.

==== Svase ====
- Played by Anthony Brophy (season 5)

A Sami chief and an ally to Lagertha. He is killed in battle. Loosely based on the legendary Sami king Svasi.

==== Snaefrid ====
- Played by Dagny Backer Johnsen (season 5)

King Svase's daughter. She becomes Bjorn's third wife and is killed in battle. Loosely based on the legendary Snæfrithr Svásadottir, a wife of Harald Fairhair.

==== Lord Cyneheard ====
- Played by Malcolm Douglas (season 5)

An ealdorman of Wessex. He conspires with Prince Aethelred to overthrow King Alfred.

==== Elsewith ====
- Played by Róisín Murphy (season 5)

Mannel's daughter, Queen Judith's niece and King Alfred's wife. She has an affair with Bjorn.

==== Thora ====
- Played by Eve Connolly (seasons 5–6)

Hvitserk's love interest. Ivar has her burned after she implicates herself as a critic of Ivar's regime and denies his status as a god. Hvitserk, after consuming psychedelic mushrooms, believes he is haunted by her ghost who implores him to kill Ivar.

==== Lady Ethelfled ====
- Played by Ann Skelly (season 5)

Lord Cuthred's daughter and Prince Aethelred's wife.

==== King Olaf ====
- Played by Steven Berkoff (seasons 5–6)

A Norwegian king with whom Ivar seeks an alliance. Hvitserk is sent to broker the deal, but Hvitserk instead asks Olaf to help overthrow Ivar. The amused Olaf has Hvitserk imprisoned and tortured. When Hvitserk refuses to relent, the impressed Olaf agrees to attack Kattegat. After the battle, he declares Bjorn king of Kattegat. Harald is seriously injured, and Olaf saves his life, but also occupies his kingdom and keeps Harald a prisoner. Loosely based on the historical Amlaib Conung

==== Amma ====
- Played by Kristy Dawn Dinsmore (seasons 5–6)

A shieldmaiden in Harald's army. After the re-conquest of Kattegat by Bjorn she is made Hvitserk's caretaker. She is killed by Ganbaatar in the final battle between the Norwegian collation and the Rus'.

==== Ingrid ====
- Played by Lucy Martin (season 6)

A slave serving Gunnhild and Bjorn in Kattegat. She becomes the fifth wife of Bjorn. After Harald rapes her and Bjorn is slain in battle, she marries Harald unsure if the child she is carrying is Bjorn's or Harald's. She is later revealed to be a witch, and after Harald's death, Ingrid becomes the sole ruler of Kattegat, ending Ragnar Lothbrok's legacy.

==== Ganbaatar ====
- Played by Andrei Claude (season 6)

Oleg's captain. He is decapitated by Gunnhild after his horse is shot dead by Ingrid.

==== Prince Dir ====
- Played by Lenn Kudrjawizki (season 6)

Oleg's brother. Oleg tortures him but he escapes after getting help from Ivar. Based on historical Prince Dir.

==== Prince Igor ====
- Played by Oran Glynn O'Donovan (season 6)

The son of Rurik and heir to Kievan Rus'. He is the ward of Oleg, who rules the kingdom in his name as regent. Igor fears Oleg, and is keen to escape to Oleg's brothers Dir and Askold. However, he is aware that he can use Oleg as a puppet, just as Oleg uses him. Igor and Ivar form a bond. Based on the historical Igor of Kiev.

==== Princess Katia ====
- Played by Alicia Agneson (season 6)

Oleg's second wife, who has a striking resemblance to Freydis. She has an affair with Ivar and it is revealed that she is a spy who was sent by Dir to overthrow Oleg. She later helps Hvitserk, Ivar and Igor escape from Oleg and is present when Oleg dies.

==== Anna ====
- Played by Serena Kennedy (season 6) and Isabelle Connolly (season 6)

Dir's wife who helps to rescue him.

==== King Hakon ====
- Played by Mishaël Lopes Cardozo (season 6)

One of the kings of Norway and a rival to Bjorn.

==== Runa ====
- Played by Gina Costigan (season 6)

A former shield-maiden now residing in Lagertha's village. She takes up arms again to defend her village against White Hair and his bandits. She does a notable job of protecting the children.

==== Gudrid ====
- Played by Noella Brennan (season 6)

A settler who travels west with Ubbe's crew. She loses her son at sea. Loosely based on the historical Gudrid Thorbjarnardóttir

==== Naad ====
- Played by Ian Lloyd Anderson (season 6)

A settler who travels west with Ubbe's crew.

==== Peminuit ====
- Played by Wesley French (season 6)

A Miꞌkmaq warrior of the New Land. He is the eldest son of Pekitaulet, the Sagamaw of her tribe.

==== We'jitu ====
- Played by Phillip Lewitski (season 6)

A Miꞌkmaq warrior and Peminuit's younger brother. He is killed by Naad.

=== Vikings: Valhalla ===
==== Agnarr ====
- Played by Christopher Rygh

One of Canute's huscarls. He becomes Emma's principal ally and enforcer in season 2 when Canute is away to fight the Vends.

==== Jarl Kåre ====
- Played by Asbjørn Krogh Nissen

A Norwegian jarl who wants to eradicate paganism in Norway. He hates pagans after his parents offered up his older brother as a human sacrifice in Uppsala when he was a child. He is the principal antagonist of season 1 of Vikings: Valhalla.

==== Queen Ælfgifu ====
- Played by Pollyanna McIntosh

Queen Ælfgifu is the first wife of Canute and is the Queen of Denmark. She is from Mercia. Ælfgifu is calculating, ambitious and charming and tries to gain as much power and respect as her husband. Based on the historical Queen Ælfgifu.

==== King Sweyn Forkbeard ====
- Played by Søren Pilmark

King Sweyn Forkbeard is the retired king of Denmark who steps in as acting ruler in England when Canute goes to fight of a Vendish invasion in Denmark. He becomes an unlikely ally to Emma. Based on the historical Sweyn Forkbeard.

==== Lord Hárekr ====
- Played by Bradley James

The ruler of Jomsborg, presented in the show as a pagan police state in Pomerania.

==== Lord Vitomir ====
- Played by Steven Brand

The lord of Chude and father of Eleana. He makes a deal to fund Harald's trade expedition to Constantinople so he and his daughter can have his protection on their own diplomatic journey to the city. He drowns in the Dnieper when the frozen river breaks during thaw.

==== Eleana / Empress Zoe ====
- Played by Sofya Lebedeva

The daughter of the Chude lord Vitomir. She becomes romantically involved with Harald during their perilous journey through Rus.

== Minor characters ==
The following is a list of named characters who have had a relatively relevant story arc on the series. They are listed in the order that they first appeared on the show.

- Eddie Drew (seasons 1 and 3) and André Eriksen (season 4) as Odin, appearing to Ragnar and his sons
- Gary Murphy as Bishop Unwan, serving at the court of King Aelle (seasons 1, 4)
- Carl Shaaban as Jesus, appearing to Athelstan and Ragnar (seasons 2–3)
- Søren Pilmark as Stender, a farmer who escaped Wessex after Aethelwulf's raid (seasons 3–4)
- Siggy (played by an uncredited infant actress), Þórunn and Bjorn's daughter who dies in childhood (seasons 3–4)
- Conn Rogers as Canute, a member of King Olaf's court (seasons 5–6)
- Martin Maloney as Vigrid, one of Ivar's men (seasons 5–6)

=== Season 1 ===
- Eddie Elks as Olafur, a Viking warrior in the service of Earl Haraldson
- Jouko Ahola as Kauko, a Finnish Viking and one of Ragnar's warriors
- Eric Higgins as Knut Tjodolf, Earl Haraldson's half-brother
- Will Irvine as Brother Cenwulf, serving at the monastery of Lindisfarne
- Sam Lucas Smith as Edwin, a Saxon
- Jonathon Kemp as Lord Wigea, an advisor of King Aelle
- Peter Gaynor as Lord Edgar, an advisor of King Aelle
- Trevor Cooper as Earl Bjarni, Thyri's husband who is far older than her and is later killed by Siggy
- Angus MacInnes as Tostig, an old Viking warrior

=== Season 2 ===
- Morgan C. Jones as The Law Giver, the lawspeaker of Kattegat
- Duncan Lacroix as Ealdorman Werferth of Wessex, serving King Ecbert
- Richard Ashton as Thorvard, a Viking warrior loyal to King Horik

=== Season 3 ===
- Mark Huberman as Louis, a soldier in Paris

=== Season 4 ===
- Niall Cusack as Abbot Lupus, Rollo's teacher in Paris
- Charles Last as William, first son of Rollo and Gisla
- Charlie Kelly as Egil, an agent of King Harald
- Caitlin Scott as Princess Blaeja, Judith's sister
- Jack Nolan as Earl Jorgensen, a Swedish warlord, sacrificed to the gods by Lagertha to secure the victory against the Saxons.
- Sophie Vavasseur as Princess Ellisif, the former betrothed of King Harald
- Gary Buckley as Earl Vik, Princess Ellisif's husband
- Uncredited child actor as Marcellus, second son of Rollo and Gisla
- Uncredited child actress as Celsa, daughter of Rollo and Gisla

=== Season 5 ===
- Keith McErlean as Lord Denewulf, a nobleman in service of Bishop Heahmund
- Albano Jerónimo as Euphemius, a Byzantine commander, based on the historical Euphemius of Sicily
- Paul Reid as Mannel, Queen Judith's cousin
- Khaled Abol Naga as Ziyadat Allah, an Arab ruler. Based on the historical Ziyadat Allah I of Ifriqiya
- Damien Devaney as Wilfred, a nobleman and Princess Elsewith's steward
- Tomi May as Jarl Olavosonn, Ivar's commander in York. He is loosely based on the historical warlord Bagsecg
- Erik Madsen as King Hemming, a leader of the Black Danes confederation
- Markjan Winnick as King Angantyr, a leader of the Black Danes confederation
- Gavan Ó Connor Duffy as King Frodo, a leader of the Black Danes confederation

=== Season 6 ===
- David Sterne as Gudmund, an old man at Lagertha's village
- Kathy Monahan as Eira, a former shield-maiden at Lagertha's village
- Per Fredrik Åsly as an envoy from Ubbe's trade expedition
- Oisin Murray as Tarben, a young boy at Lagertha's village
- Aoibheann McCann as Skadi, a shield-maiden under Gunnhild's command
- Fredrik Hiller as Jarl Thorkell the Tall, one the jarls of Norway and a rival to Bjorn
- Amy De Bruhn as Jarl Hrolf, one the jarls of Norway
- Brent Burns as Skane, one of Harald's ambitious followers
- Ivo Alexandre as Bishop Leon, who visits Kiev for Easter
- Russell Balogh as Bishop Aldulf, a warrior priest in King Alfred's army
- Breffni Holahan as Sister Annis, a nun who assists Queen Elsewith
- Brendan McCormack as Leof, a soldier in King Alfred's army
- Oliver Price as Galan, a soldier in King Alfred's army
- Dafhyd Flynn as Adam, a soldier in King Alfred's army
- Tim Creed as Orlyg, a slave serving King Erik in Kattegat
- Carmen Moore as Pekitaulet, Peminuit and We'jitu's mother and the Sagamaw of her tribe
- Ellyn Jade as Nikani, Peminuit's wife
- Acahkos Johnson as Na'pa'tes, a Miꞌkmaq child
- Victoire Dauxerre as Nissa, a slave in the service of Queen Ingrid in Kattegat
- Sean McGillicuddy as Osric, Bishop Aldulf's second-in-command

== Guest characters ==
The following is a list of named characters who appeared in just one episode of the series.

=== Season 1 ===
- Gerard McCarthy as Brondsted, a Viking who attacks Lagertha
- Billy Gibson as Ulf, Earl Haraldson's bodyguard
- David Wilmot as Olaf Andwend, a Viking accused of theft
- Conor Madden as Eric Trygvasson, a Viking who is prosecuted in Kattegat by Earl Haraldson
- Cian Quinn as Olaf, son of Ingolf
- Craig Whittaker as Hakon, a Viking and one of Ragnar's men
- Des Braiden as Father Cuthbert, in charge of the monastery of Lindisfarne
- Sebastiaan Vermeul Taback as Osiric
- David Murray as Lord Aethelwulf, the brother of King Aelle
- Sean Treacy as Prince Egbert, King Aelle and Queen Ealhswith's son
- James Flynn as Eadric, a Saxon lord
- David Michael Scott as Nils, a Viking warrior from Götaland in the service of Jarl Borg

=== Season 2 ===
- Anna Åström as Hild, a servant in Kattegat
- Jay Duffy as Ari, King Horik's second son
- Alan Devine as Ealdorman Eadric of Wessex, serving King Ecbert
- Edmund Kente as Bishop Swithern of Winchester. Based on the historical Swithun.
- Jens Christian Buskov Lund as Olrik
- Elizabeth Moynihan as Queen Gunnhild of Denmark, King Horik's wife

=== Season 3 ===
- Ian Beattie as King Brihtwulf of Mercia, Kwenthrith and Burgred's uncle. Based on the historical Beorhtwulf of Mercia.
- James Murphy as Ansgar, a monk trying to convert Vikings in Kattegat. Based on the historical Ansgar.

=== Season 4 ===
- Cillian O'Sullivan as Eirik, a Viking warrior in Paris, former second in command of Rollo. He is betrayed by him and killed by Franks.
- Robert "Robban" Follin as Berserker, an assassin recruited by Erlendur and Kalf
- Declan Conlon as Lord Wigstan, a relative of Kwenthrith and head of the Royal Family of Mercia. Based on the semi-historical Wigstan.
- John Kavanagh as Pope Leo IV
- Adam McNamara as Thorhall, a Danish Viking
- Liam Clarke as Gudmund, a settler in Ragnar and Ivar's party
- Ed Murphy as Gardar, a settler in Ragnar and Ivar's party
- Jack Walsh as Scotus, loosely based on the historical John Scotus Eriugena
- Josh Donaldson as Hoskuld, a Viking warrior of great skill
- Tamaryn Payne as Widow Ordlaf, a lady of Sherborne

=== Season 5 ===
- India Mullen as Aethegyth, a noblewoman from Wessex
- Frank Prendergast as Bishop Cynebert of York
- Laurence O'Fuarain as Hakon, a whale hunter of Vestfold
- Bosco Hogan as the Lord Abbot of Lindisfarne
- Mabel Hurley as young Lagertha, appearing in a flashback
- Ross Matthew Anderson as Lagertha's father, appearing in a flashback
- Jamie Maclachlan as Aldwin, a Saxon commander
- Uncredited infant actor as Baldur, Ivar and Freydis's son

=== Season 6 ===
- Blake Kubena as Prince Askold of Novgorod, Oleg's brother
- Sandy Kennedy as Sylvi, a former shield-maiden at Lagertha's village
- Neil Keery as Alexei, a guard in Kiev
- Anna Maria Jopek as a singer in Kattegat
- Jinny Lofthouse as Hild, a shield-maiden under Gunnhild's command
- Emma Willis as Gyda, a shield maiden that volunteers as a sacrifice
- Karen Connell as the Angel of Death, a völva
- Adam Winnick as Rangvald, Harald's captain
- Emma Eliza Regan as Aoife, a villager from Istrehågan
- Ronan Summers as Herigar, one of Erik's warriors
- Katherine Devlin as Natasha, at Oleg's court
- Noah Syndergaard as Thorbjorn, a Viking warrior in Kattegat
- Jerry-Jane Pears as Iðunn, the goddess of youth, who appears to Hvitserk
- Bryan Larkin as Wiglaf, a Saxon commander

== Family trees ==
Continuous lines signify a lineal descent and/or consanguinity, dashed lines signify a marriage, and dotted lines signify a sexual relationship.

=== Earl Haraldson, King Ragnar, King Horik, Emperor Charles, King Harald and Prince Oleg's family tree ===
Haraldson ✝	Siggy ✝	Horik ✝	Gunnhild ✝
? ✝	? ✝	Thyri ✝	Bjarni ✝	Erlendur ✝	Ari ✝
Charles	Kalf ✝	Astrid ✝	Harald ✝	Halfdan ✝
Gisla	Rollo	Lagertha ✝	Ragnar ✝	Aslaug ✝	Harbard
Ingrid
Svase ✝	Gyda ✝	Þórunn	Bjorn ✝	Torvi	Borg ✝
Snaefrid ✝	Hali ✝	Asa ✝	Guthrum ✝
Siggy ✝	Erik ✝	Gunnhild ✝
William	Marcellus	Celsa	Margrethe ✝	Ubbe	Hvitserk	Thora ✝	Sigurd ✝
Ragnar
Askold ✝	Anna	Dir	Rurik ✝	? ✝	Oleg ✝	Katia	Ivar ✝	Freydis ✝
Igor	Baldur ✝

=== King Ecbert and King Aelle's family tree ===
Ecbert ✝	Ealhswith	Aelle ✝	Aethelwulf ✝
Aethelwulf ✝	Judith ✝	Athelstan ✝	Blaeja	Egbert	Mannel ✝
Aethelred ✝	Alfred	Elsewith
Edward

=== Queen Kwenthrith's family tree ===
Offa ✝	Brihtwulf ✝	Wigstan
Kenelm ✝	Burgred ✝	Kwenthrith ✝	Ragnar ✝
Magnus ✝

=== Floki's family tree ===
Floki	Helga ✝
Angrboda ✝

=== Kjetill and Eyvind's family tree ===
Eric Trygvasson ✝
Kjetill	Ingvild	Eyvind ✝	Rafarta ✝
Frodi ✝	Thorgrim ✝	Aud ✝	Thorunn ✝	Helgi ✝	Bul ✝	Asbjorn ✝	Jorunn ✝

=== Pekitaulet's family tree ===
Pekitaulet
Nikani	Peminuit	We'jitu ✝
