= Vikings season 3 =

Season of television series

Vikings
- Season 3
- DVD cover art
- Starring: Travis Fimmel; Katheryn Winnick; Clive Standen; Jessalyn Gilsig; Gustaf Skarsgård; George Blagden; Alexander Ludwig; Alyssa Sutherland; Ben Robson; Linus Roache; Kevin Durand; Lothaire Bluteau
- No. of episodes: 10

Release
- Original network: History
- Original release: February 19 – April 23, 2015

Season chronology
- ← Previous; Season 2 Next → Season 4

The third season of the historical drama television series Vikings premiered on February 19, 2015, on History in Canada, and concluded on April 23, 2015, consisting of ten episodes. The series broadly follows the exploits of the legendary Viking chieftain Ragnar Lothbrok and his crew, and later those of his sons. The first season of the series begins at the start of the Viking Age, marked by the Lindisfarne raid in 793.

The third season follows the development of Ragnar's family, and the Vikings as they become more entwined in English mingling affairs, and also begin to raid farther afield.

== Cast ==
=== Main ===
- Travis Fimmel as King Ragnar Lothbrok, the head of the Viking earldom of Kattegat who became king after Horik's death
- Katheryn Winnick as Lagertha, a shield-maiden and Ragnar's ex-wife; she controls the Earldom of Hedeby calling herself Earl Ingstad.
- Clive Standen as Rollo, a warrior and Ragnar's brother
- Jessalyn Gilsig as Siggy, widow of Earl Haraldson and Rollo's lover
- Gustaf Skarsgård as Floki, a gifted shipbuilder and friend of Ragnar's
- George Blagden as Athelstan, an Anglo-Saxon monk from Northumbria who is torn between the Viking gods and the Christian God; he is a friend and adviser to both King Ragnar and King Ecbert.
- Alexander Ludwig as Bjorn Ironside, Ragnar and Lagertha's son, who has fallen in love with the shield-maiden Þórunn
- Alyssa Sutherland as Queen Aslaug, Brynhildr's daughter and Ragnar's second wife
- Ben Robson as Kalf, the ruler of Hedeby in the absence of Lagertha
- Linus Roache as the ruthless King Ecbert of Wessex
- Kevin Durand as Harbard, a wanderer
- Lothaire Bluteau as Emperor Charles of West Francia

=== Recurring ===
- Amy Bailey as Princess/Queen Kwenthrith of Mercia
- Moe Dunford as Prince Aethelwulf of Wessex, son of King Ecbert
- Maude Hirst as Helga, Floki's wife
- Gaia Weiss as Þórunn (/θorunn/), a freed slave and Björn's love interest
- Jefferson Hall as Torstein, one of Ragnar's warriors
- Jennie Jacques as Princess Judith of Northumbria, daughter of King Ælle, wedded to Aethelwulf
- John Kavanagh as the Seer, a seiðmann
- Steve Wall as Einar, a relative of late Jarl Sigvard and an opponent of Lagertha in Hedeby
- Cathal O'Hallin as Hvitserk, second son of Ragnar and Aslaug
- Cormac Melia as Ubbe, eldest son of Ragnar and Aslaug
- Philip O'Sullivan as Bishop Edmund, serving at the court of King Ecbert
- Aaron Monaghan as Prince Burgred, the younger brother of Princess Kwenthrith
- Edvin Endre as Erlendur, son of King Horik
- Georgia Hirst as Torvi, the widow of Jarl Borg and the new wife of Erlendur
- Greg Orvis as Earl Siegfried, one of the Viking commanders in the siege of Paris
- Frankie McCafferty as Sinric, a polyglot drifter
- Owen Roe as Count Odo of Paris
- Morgane Polanski as Princess Gisla of West Francia, the daughter of Emperor Charles
- Huw Parmenter as Roland, Count Odo's first-in-command and Therese's brother
- Mark Huberman as Louis, a soldier in Paris
- Karen Hassan as Therese, Roland's sister and Count Odo's mistress

=== Guests ===
- Ian Beattie as King Brihtwulf of Mercia
- Ivan Kaye as King Aelle of Northumbria
- Elinor Crawley as Thyri, Earl Haraldson and Siggy's daughter
- Søren Pilmark as Stender, a farmer who escaped Wessex after Aethelwulf's raid
- Eddie Drew as Odin, appearing in Ragnar's visions
- Carl Shaaban as Jesus, appearing in Ragnar's visions
- James Murphy as Ansgar, a monk who is trying to convert Vikings in Kattegat

== Episodes ==
No. overall	No. in season	Title	Directed by	Written by	Original release date
20	1	"Mercenary"	Ken Girotti	Michael Hirst	February 19, 2015
Ragnar tells Björn that he never wanted to be king, but only to explore and farm. Ragnar wants to return to Wessex to claim the land promised by King Ecbert. Floki feels that his new family with Helga is too happy, while Rollo wishes to be away from Siggy. Þórunn desires to be a shield-maiden like Lagertha, much to Björn's displeasure; he believes her to be carrying his child. When Lagertha announces she intends to raid with Ragnar, Kalf, her right-hand man, offers to remain and take care of Hedeby. But he betrays her as soon as she is gone to usurp the earldom with the help of Einar. When Ragnar and Lagertha arrive in Wessex, King Ecbert brings a new condition to give his land. The Vikings must fight for Princess Kwenthrith to appease King Ecbert's nobles. Lagertha is unsure about joining, so King Ecbert offers her the job of leading the Viking settlers in Wessex. The settlers go to the land to farm, while the warriors defeat Kwenthrith's uncle's army.
21	2	"The Wanderer"	Ken Girotti	Michael Hirst	February 26, 2015
A celebration is held in honour of the victory. Kwenthrith asks for the head of her uncle, and Ragnar questions her hatred; she admits to having been sexually abused as a child by him and her oldest brother. Concerned about Þórunn's safety, Björn lectures and then proposes to marry her. In Kattegat, Helga, Siggy, and Aslaug share strange dreams about a hooded stranger walking in the mist, one hand bloody and the other holding steaming snow. In Hedeby, Kalf expresses his jealousy towards Ragnar, insinuating a wish to kill him. Prince Aethelwulf searches for the young brother of the princess and his army. He captures a soldier who tells him that they expect reinforcements. Torstein's left arm becomes gangrenous and he asks Floki to amputate it. King Ecbert, woos Lagertha and offers her a necklace. Princess Judith tells Athelstan during confession that she dreamt of sleeping with him, and they kiss. In Kattegat, Helga meets the stranger from her dreams who is wounded in the right hand.
22	3	"Warrior's Fate"	Jeff Woolnough	Michael Hirst	March 5, 2015
Helga, Siggy, and Aslaug help Harbard with his hand. He explains that he is a wanderer, offering to share stories about his travels and the gods in return for lodging. In England, Floki resents Ragnar's fighting for the Christians. The Vikings begin climbing the mountain to fight Kwenthrith's brother and his army. She asks Ragnar to spare her brother. Torstein volunteers to go first and dies valiantly. While Ragnar and his men fight their way up the hill, Aethelwulf's archers surround Kwenthrith's brother, killing many and forcing him to surrender. Þórunn is severely injured. Ragnar finds out that Þórunn is pregnant and chastises his son for allowing her to fight. In England, King Ecbert shows Lagertha his Roman bathhouse and invites his guests to join him in the bath, leading to Ecbert and Lagertha having sex. In Kattegat, a fisherman catches two drowned young boys in his nets. Siggy visits the Seer to discuss Harbard and her dreams.
23	4	"Scarred"	Jeff Woolnough	Michael Hirst	March 12, 2015
Aethelwulf attempts to befriend Rollo and Floki; Floki is unhappy about fighting for Christians. Athelstan sleeps with Judith and they both express their love for each other. Kwenthrith urinates on Ragnar's wounds. King Ecbert and Lagertha have a sexual relationship, but she tells him that "he only cares for himself". In Kattegat, Aslaug sleeps with Harbard. Harbard seems to be able to ease Ivar's pain simply by touching and talking to him. Kalf invites Erlendur to the village to help fight against Lagertha's return. Erlendur accepts and comes with his wife Torvi, who recently gave birth to Jarl Borg's heir. Aslaug's sons run out of their home and Siggy finds them walking across a frozen pond, where they fall through the thin ice. Siggy dives in, and Harbard pulls them out as Siggy drowns. In England, Princess Kwenthrith poisons her brother Burgred. She then proposes a toast to herself as the sole ruler of Mercia to which all in the room acknowledge and then pour out their wine onto the floor. Before Harbard leaves Kattegat, he tells Aslaug that Ivar's pain will now be less.
24	5	"The Usurper"	Helen Shaver	Michael Hirst	March 19, 2015
The Vikings return to Kattegat, and the women learn of Torstein's death as the men learn of Siggy's. Ragnar is suspicious about why Aslaug was not watching the children. Floki becomes more outspoken about his hatred for Christians, and Athelstan. Helga tells Floki about Harbard, and he claims that Harbard is a god. Aethelwulf learns that Judith is pregnant with Athelstan's child, and he is sent to the settlement. A messenger arrives to tell Lagertha that her earldom has been usurped by Kalf; she asks Ragnar to help win it back. Ragnar tells the men that they will raid Paris in the spring. Ragnar returns with Lagertha to speak with Kalf, although he decides not to help fight for Lagertha, and instead asks him to join the raid on Paris. Aethelwulf leads his soldiers to the settlement and kills all the settlers. Floki tells Ragnar that Aslaug slept with Harbard and that Harbard is another name for Odin. King Ecbert finds out about the settlers' fate; he chides his nobles, then in private reveals that it was his plan all along.
25	6	"Born Again"	Helen Shaver	Michael Hirst	March 26, 2015
Þórunn gives birth to a girl that Bjorn names Siggy. A farmer returns from Wessex and tells Ragnar about Aethelwulf's massacre. Athelstan has a sign from God and tells Ragnar that he has been born again as a Christian. In Wessex, Judith gives birth to a son but is then sentenced to having her ears and nose cut off for adultery. After one ear is removed, she reveals that Athelstan is the father. King Ecbert says the child is sent from God and will be christened Alfred. Earl Kalf leads a fleet to Kattegat to join the raid on Paris, along with Erlendur and Torvi. During a party, Erlendur publicly cheats on his wife, who then decide to sleep with Bjorn. Rollo reveals that Athelstan no longer wears his armband. Floki receives a sign that "blood must be spilled", and kills Athelstan while he is praying. Ragnar, heartbroken by Athelstan's death, carries his body up the side of the mountain for burial and asks Athelstan to forgive his upcoming actions.
26	7	"Paris"	Kelly Makin	Michael Hirst	April 2, 2015
Ragnar's Viking fleet, also reinforced by Earl Siegfried, arrives in Francia and prepares for battle. Emperor Charles is asked by count Odo to evacuate Paris, but after privately consulting his daughter Gisla, he refuses. Ragnar shocks them when he decides to leave Floki in charge of the attack. Both Vikings and Franks prepare for the siege as the Christians pray for protection from the pagans. In England, Queen Kwenthrith has killed the Wessex nobles and has broken her ties with King Ecbert. The king sends his son, Aethelwulf, to Mercia to force her back into submission. She informs Aethelwulf that her son, Magnus, was fathered by Ragnar. She eventually submits once Aethelwulf tells her about the massacre of the Viking settlement.
27	8	"To the Gates!"	Kelly Makin	Michael Hirst	April 9, 2015
The Vikings attack Paris. Lagertha, Kalf, and Erlendur lead an attack on the city gate; meanwhile, Floki, Ragnar, Bjorn, and Rollo try to breach the walls from boats on the river. Princess Gisla manages to restore faith in the Frank troops by revealing the Oriflamme, the holy banner of their patron, Saint Denis. Eventually, the defense holds, repelling the Vikings with the use of oil, fire, and crossbows. While the Franks celebrate their victory, at the Viking camp the warriors have to deal with their wounded, including a badly wounded Bjorn, and Ragnar who has been thrown down from the walls. Floki is consumed by his guilt, having trusted in the good omens of their gods. Helga, disgusted by his selfishness, leaves him.
28	9	"Breaking Point"	Ken Girotti	Michael Hirst	April 16, 2015
With the Vikings still recovering, Ragnar orders another attack. Led by Rollo, Lagertha, and Kalf, they manage to pass the bridge, but they are once again pushed back. Siegfried is captured and executed on Gisla's insistence. Although the Franks have managed to defend the city, a plague has spread in Paris and citizens are dying. Count Odo begs the Emperor to come to terms with their enemy. Ragnar's wounds won't heal, leaving him weak. Trying to restore his leadership, he secretly meets the Franks; although offered gold and silver, Ragnar doesn't accept. Knowing his end is drawing near, he asks to be baptized and to be buried inside the city. Meanwhile, Aslaug rules in Kattegat and deals with the Christian missionary Ansgar. Ansgar tries to carry a hot piece of metal to prove the might of the Christian god. When he fails, Aslaug has him killed. In England, King Ecbert and Judith start up an affair.
29	10	"The Dead"	Ken Girotti	Michael Hirst	April 23, 2015
The Franks pay gold and silver to the Vikings, but they show no sign of leaving. Many people are still shocked at Ragnar's christening, and when the badly wounded leader dies, Bjorn is in charge. The warriors place Ragnar into a wooden coffin and escort it to the gates of Paris, where they meet the Bishop. The coffin is brought inside the Cathedral to be blessed, but Ragnar suddenly jumps out of the coffin alive. He takes Princess Gisla as a hostage and forces the guards to open the gates, allowing the Vikings to enter the city. Most of the Vikings then set sail for home, but a small party, led by Rollo, remain camped outside the city to maintain a presence for next year's raid. Emperor Charles is determined to gain his favour, offering Rollo land and titles, and his daughter in marriage in exchange for his pledge to defend Paris against future Viking attacks. While sailing home Ragnar tells Floki that he knows he is Athelstan's killer.

== Production ==
=== Development ===
An Irish-Canadian co-production presented by Metro-Goldwyn-Mayer, Vikings was developed and produced by Octagon Films and Take 5 Productions. Morgan O'Sullivan, Sheila Hockin, Sherry Marsh, Alan Gasmer, James Flynn, John Weber, and Michael Hirst are credited as executive producers. This season was produced by Steve Wakefield and Keith Thompson. Bill Goddard and Séamus McInerney are co-producers.

The production team for this season includes casting directors Frank and Nuala Moiselle, costume designer Joan Bergin, visual effects supervisors Julian Parry and Dominic Remane, stunt action designers Franklin Henson and Richard Ryan, composer Trevor Morris, production designer Mark Geraghty, editors Aaron Marshall for the first, third, fifth, seventh and ninth episodes, and Tad Seaborn for the second, fourth, sixth, eighth and tenth episodes, and cinematographer PJ Dillon.

=== Music ===
The Vikings III (Music from the TV Series)

Soundtrack album by Trevor Morris
- Released: May 15, 2015
- Genre: Soundtrack
- Length: 81:34
- Label: Sony Classical Records

The musical score for the third season was composed by Trevor Morris in collaboration with Einar Selvik and Steve Tavaglione. The opening sequence is again accompanied by the song "If I Had a Heart" by Fever Ray.

The soundtrack album was released on May 15, 2015, by Sony Classical Records. Two additional pieces not included in the album are Selvik's original songs "Voluspá"—featured in "Born Again" and briefly incorporated in the score track "Floki Appears to Kill Athelstan"—and "Heljarlokk", written by Selvik and Lindy-Fay Hella and featured in "The Dead". "Voluspá" was released as a single by Wardruna on November 9, 2018.

Additional non-original music by Norwegian music group Wardruna is featured in the episodes "The Wanderer", "Paris", "To the Gates!" and "Breaking Point". The featured tracks—which were not included in the soundtrack release—are "Helvegen", "Løyndomsriss", "Heimta Thurs", "Algir — Tognatale", "Rotlaust Tre Fell", "Sowelu", "IwaR", "IngwaR" and "Ár var alda".

Historical church music performed by Marcel Pérès & Ensemble Organum is included in the episode "The Dead".

Music by Canadian throat singer Tanya Tagaq is also featured in this season's soundtrack; the vocals in Tagaq's "Uja" are sampled in the score track "Battle for the Hill of the Ash", which plays in the episode "Warrior's Fate", while the song "Howl" is featured in the episode "The Dead".

Track listing
No.	Title	Artist(s)	Length
1.	"The Seer Gives Lagertha a Prophecy"	Trevor Morris; Einar Selvik; Steve Tavaglione	1:50
2.	"The Vikings Sail for Wessex"	Morris; Selvik; Tavaglione	1:37
3.	"Kwenthrith's Story"	Morris; Selvik; Tavaglione	2:08
4.	"Vikings Battle Brihtwulf's Army"	Morris; Selvik; Tavaglione	6:02
5.	"Torstein Loses an Arm"	Morris; Selvik; Tavaglione	1:29
6.	"A Cloaked Figure Arrives in Kattegat"	Morris; Selvik; Tavaglione	3:32
7.	"Battle for the Hill of the Ash"	Morris; Selvik; Tavaglione	4:20
8.	"Judith"	Morris; Selvik; Tavaglione	2:02
9.	"Sacrifice for the Crops"	Morris; Selvik; Tavaglione	1:48
10.	"Siggy Sacrifices Herself to Save Ragnar's Sons"	Morris; Selvik; Tavaglione	4:37
11.	"Rollo Learns of Siggy's Sacrifice"	Morris; Selvik; Tavaglione	1:57
12.	"Bjorn Fights to Save Rollo"	Morris; Selvik; Tavaglione	1:26
13.	"Helga Tells Floki of Harbard"	Morris; Selvik; Tavaglione	2:12
14.	"The Seer Laughs at Rollo's Misery"	Morris; Selvik; Tavaglione	1:50
15.	"Aethelwulf Attacks"	Morris; Selvik; Tavaglione	3:13
16.	"Ragnar Kills the Messenger"	Morris; Selvik; Tavaglione	1:25
17.	"Athelstan is Reborn"	Morris; Selvik; Tavaglione	1:56
18.	"Floki Appears to Kill Athelstan"	Morris; Selvik; Tavaglione	3:11
19.	"Ragnar Honors Athelstan's Death"	Morris; Selvik; Tavaglione	0:57
20.	"Ecbert Sends Athelwulf on a Journey"	Morris; Selvik; Tavaglione	1:36
21.	"Aethelwulf Meets with Kwenthrith"	Morris; Selvik; Tavaglione	2:23
22.	"Floki's Siege Towers Revealed"	Morris; Selvik; Tavaglione	1:29
23.	"Vikings Reach Paris"	Morris; Selvik; Tavaglione	2:40
24.	"The Attack Begins"	Morris; Selvik; Tavaglione	3:38
25.	"The Walls are Breached; the French Lose Hope"	Morris; Selvik; Tavaglione	1:36
26.	"Ragnar Knows Floki Killed Athelstan"	Morris; Selvik; Tavaglione	1:06
27.	"Vikings Attempt to Rip Open Gates"	Morris; Selvik; Tavaglione	2:58
28.	"Floki Melt Down"	Morris; Selvik; Tavaglione	1:34
29.	"Floki Curses the Gods"	Morris; Selvik; Tavaglione	1:25
30.	"Kalf and Lagertha Make a Pact"	Morris; Selvik; Tavaglione	2:46
31.	"Lagertha's Stealth Assault on the Bridge"	Morris; Selvik; Tavaglione	1:43
32.	"The French Counter — Attack"	Morris; Selvik; Tavaglione	1:34
33.	"Ragnar Hallucinates, Sees Gods"	Morris; Selvik; Tavaglione	1:01
34.	"The Vikings are Told of Ragnar's Death"	Morris; Selvik; Tavaglione	2:06
35.	"Vikings Attack Paris"	Morris; Selvik; Tavaglione	2:38
36.	"Ragnar Sets Sail for Home"	Morris; Selvik; Tavaglione	1:49
Total length:			81:34

== Reception ==
=== Critical response ===
The review aggregator website Rotten Tomatoes reported a 100% approval rating, with an average rating of 8/10 based on 11 reviews. The critical consensus reads: "Vikings continues its onslaught of engrossing action, intrigue, and characters, led by Michael Hirst's strong vision of Norse legend." On Metacritic, which uses a weighted average, it scored 81 out of 100, based on seven reviews, indicating "universal acclaim".
