= Marco Ilsø =

Danish actor

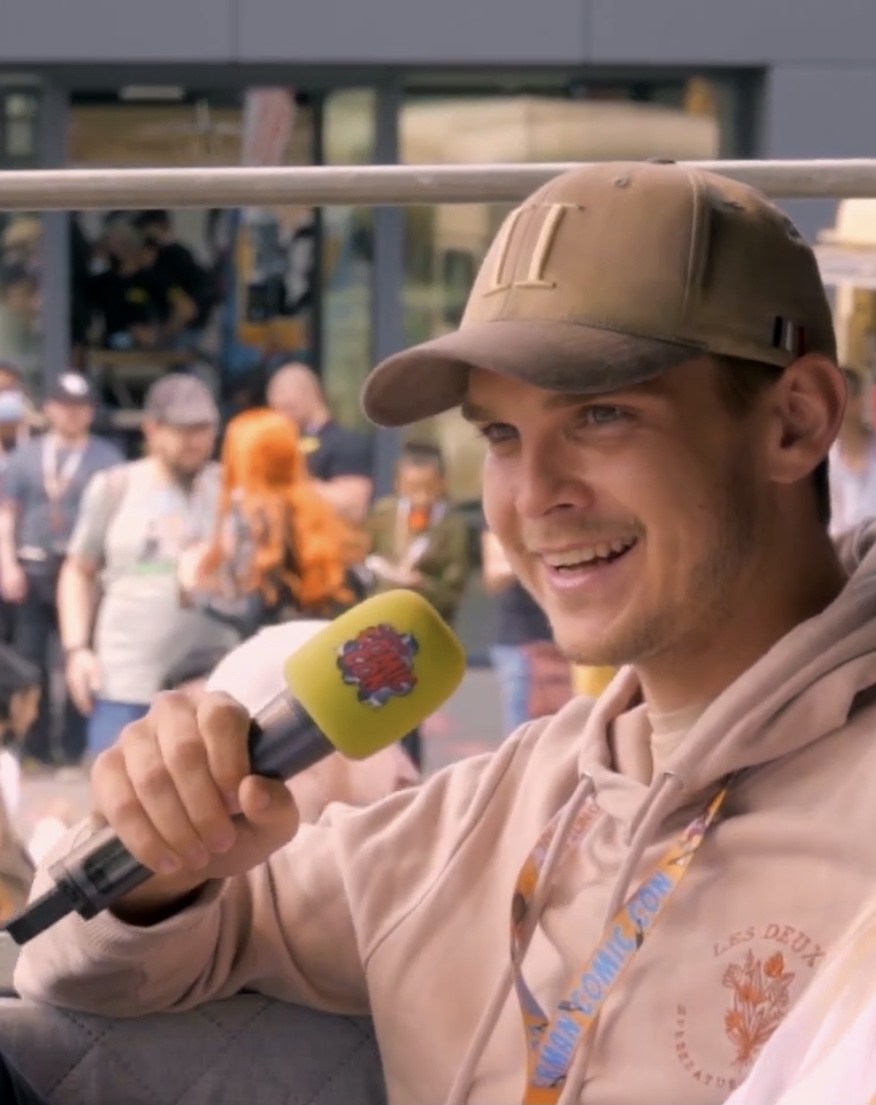
- Ilsø in 2021
- Born: Denmark
- Occupations: Actor, former footballer
- Partner(s): Trine Bach Andersen. Daughters = Kaja and Liv Ilsø

Marco Ilsø is a Danish actor. As a child actor, he had a lead role in Mikkel og guldkortet (2008), and played Hvitserk, a son of Ragnar Lothbrok, from series 4 to 6 on the Michael Hirst series Vikings (2016-2018).

== Career ==
His first acting role was as a 14-year-old, playing the lead in 24 episodes of Mikkel og Guldkortet.

In 2016, introduced in season 4, he played the second son of Ragnar and Aslaug, Hvitserk in Vikings.

== Selected filmography ==
- Rebounce as Niclas (2011)
- The Absent One as young Ditlev (2014)
- Danny’s Doomsday as Lukas (2014)
- The Model as Frederik (2016)
- Uro as Kevin (2018)
- Wild Men as Simon (2021)
- Storm Rider: Legend of Hammerhead as Neb (2026)

== Selected television ==
- Mikkel og Guldkortet as Mikkel in 24 episodes (2008)
- Vikings as Hvitserk (seasons 4–6)
- Warrior as Mads (season 1)
- Borgen - Power & Glory as Villads (2022)
