= The Model (film) =

2016 Danish film

- Theatrical release poster
- Directed by: Mads Matthiesen
- Screenplay by: Mads Matthiesen; Martin Zandvliet; Anders August
- Produced by: Jonas Bagger; Ole Wendorff-Østergaard; Madeleine Ekman
- Starring: Maria Palm; Ed Skrein; Charlotte Tomaszewska; Marco Ilsø; Thierry Hancisse
- Cinematography: Petrus Sjövik
- Edited by: Pernille Bech Christensen
- Music by: Sune Martin
- Production companies: Zentropa; Film i Väst
- Distributed by: Nordisk Film
- Release dates: 30 January 2016 (International Film Festival Rotterdam); 11 February 2016 (Denmark)
- Running time: 105 minutes
- Country: Denmark
- Languages: English; Danish; French
- Box office: $27,000

The Model is a 2016 Danish psychological thriller film directed by Mads Matthiesen and written by Matthiesen, Martin Zandvliet and Anders August. The film stars Maria Palm and Ed Skrein.

== Plot ==
A young mentally ill Danish model named Emma is fighting for a breakthrough in the Parisian fashion world. Her journey to the center of the city of fashion, Paris, and the glamorous life as a top model evolve into a true drama, as Emma meets the attractive and somewhat older fashion photographer Shane White. Emma begins to love her lifestyle, and with Shane by her side, the fashion industry's doors begin to open. But soon Emma finds that love also has gloomy facets, and her dreams are challenged by both Shane and an unexpected, dark side of herself.

== Cast ==
- Maria Palm as Emma
- Charlotte Tomaszewski as Zofia
- Ed Skrein as Shane White
- Yvonnick Muller as André
- Dominic Allburn as Sebastian
- Virgile Bramly as Marcel
- Thierry Hancisse as Bernard
- Marco Ilsø as Frederik

== Reception ==
The Model received mixed reviews from critics. On review aggregator Rotten Tomatoes, the film has a rating of 71%, based on seven reviews, with an average rating of 5.87/10. Metacritic gives the film a score of 58 out of 100, based on six critics, indicating "mixed or average reviews".

The main criticisms of the film were its narrative, particularly plot development, and lack of character development. Variety stated, "The screenplay by Matthiessen and co-writers Martin Pieter Zandvliet and Anders Frithiof August is compelling up until the melodramatic, credulity-straining final act, although the characters, apart from Emma, feel underdeveloped". Neil Genzlinger of The New York Times wrote, "The bodies are thin in the Danish film and so is the plot, though the real-life model who plays the lead role acquits herself well enough".
