= Georgia Hirst =

English actress (b. 1994)

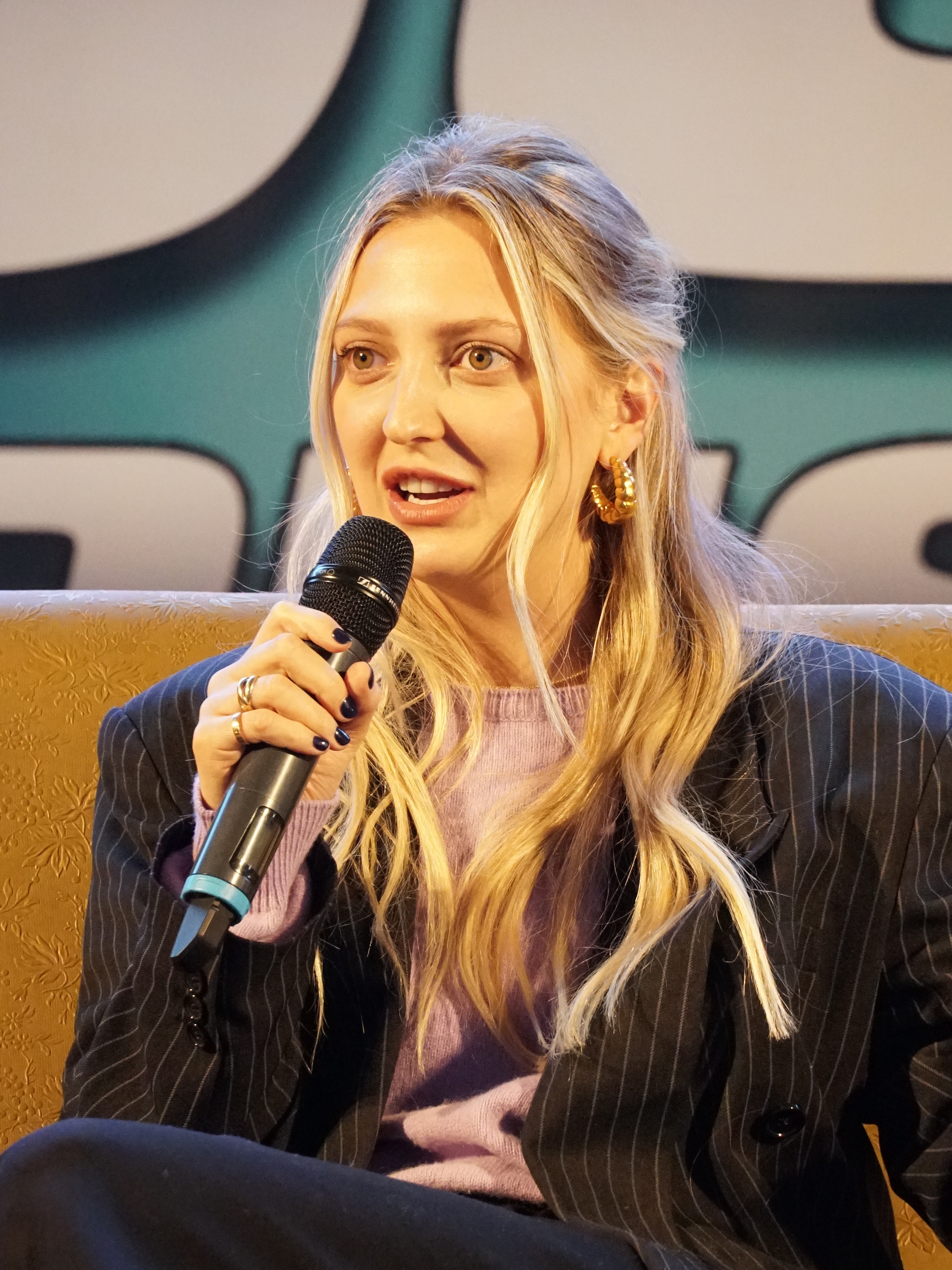
- Hirst in 2022
- Born: Georgia Octavia Hirst; 26 December 1994 (age 31); Oxford, Oxfordshire, England
- Education: Drama Centre London
- Occupation: Actress
- Years active: 2014–present
- Spouse: Elliott Thornhill (m. 2024)
- Children: 1
- Father: Michael Hirst
- Family: Maude Hirst (sister)

Georgia Octavia Hirst (born 26 December 1994) is an English actress. She is known for her roles as Torvi in the History series Vikings (2014–2020) and Becky in the zombie horror movie Ravers (2018).

== Early life ==
Hirst was born on Boxing Day in Oxford. She is the daughter of writer Michael Hirst. Her older half-sister Maude Hirst appeared alongside her in Vikings. She has a younger brother Horatio who is also an actor and played “Billy the kid”. Hirst trained in acting at the Drama Centre London.

== Career ==
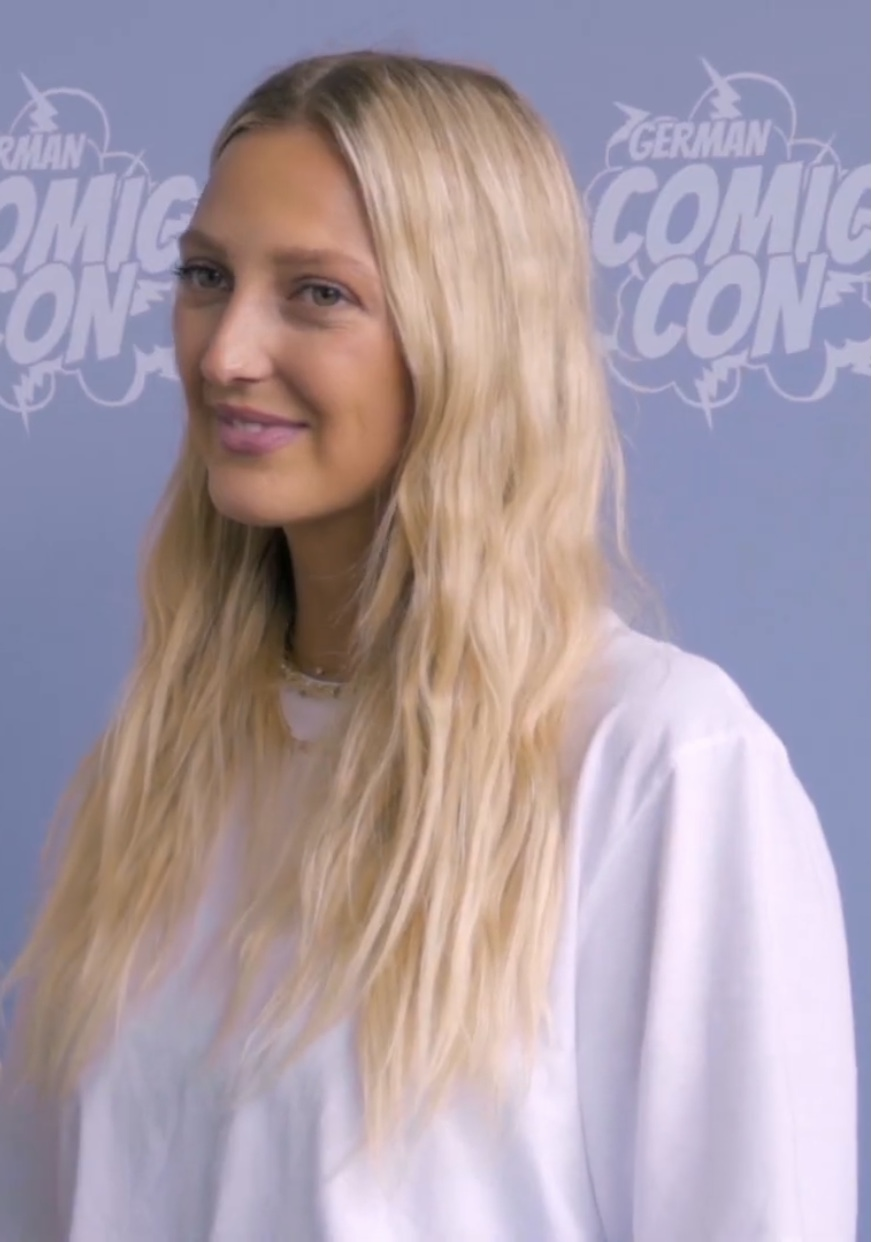
Hirst at the 2021 German Comic Con

Hirst dedicated most of her early acting career to playing the character Torvi in the television series Vikings; the character debuted in 2013 in the second season. She was promoted to series regular during the sixth season.

In 2018, Hirst was the sole actor in the Stephen Gates directed short film Dungeness, and starred as Becky in the 2018 techno music zombie horror movie Ravers, which had its world premiere at the 2018 London FrightFest Film Festival. In 2020, Hirst played the role of Grace in the interactive rom-com Five Dates.

== Philanthropy ==
In 2021, Hirst joined The Celebs to record a cover of The Beatles classic "Let It Be", in support of the Mind charity and released on 3 December 2021. Hirst was part of a choir of celebrities including Anne Hegerty, Ivan Kaye and Eunice Olumide, who were backing EastEnders actress Shona McGarty.

== Personal life ==
In 2017, Hirst made an appearance on Sky News where she urged young female fans to go ahead with smear tests after she had herself been diagnosed with precancerous cells at the age of 22. Hirst followed this by appearing in a Mika Simmons podcast, The Happy Vagina on the same topic.

== Filmography ==
=== Film and television ===
Year	Title	Role	Notes
2014–2020	Vikings	Torvi	Recurring (seasons 2–6); Main (season 6); 63 episodes
2018	Ravers	Becky	Film
2018	Dungeness	woman	Short film
2020	Five Dates	Grace	Interactive Film
2023	To England, With Love	Ali	

=== Music video ===
Year	Artist	Title	Role	Notes
2021	Calum Scott	Rise	Patient	Music Video
2021	Shona McGarty	Let It Be	Herself	Music Video

=== Video games ===
Year	Title	Role	Notes
2022	Deathtrap Dungeon		Voice
