= Eadmund of Winchester =

Once believed to have been a Bishop

Eadmund
- Died: possibly between 833 and 838
- Known for: Once thought to have been Bishop of Winchester

Eadmund was a 9th-century Englishman. It had been thought he had been Bishop of Winchester between 833 and 838. However, following further studies he is no longer listed to have been bishop.
