= Maude Hirst =

English actress (born 1988)

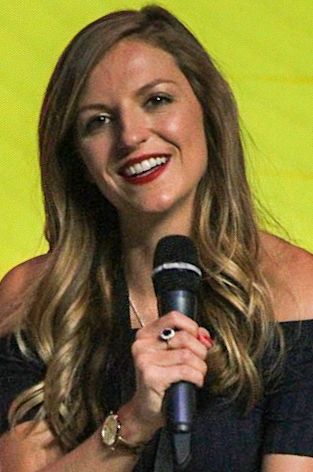
- Hirst in 2018
- Born: Maude Gabriella Hirst; February 1988 (age 38); Hackney, London, England
- Education: Italia Conti Academy of Theatre Arts
- Occupations: Actress, fitness trainer
- Years active: 2008–present
- Father: Michael Hirst
- Family: Georgia Hirst (sister)

Maude Gabriella Hirst (born February 1988) is an English actress. She is known for her appearances on television in the series The Tudors (2007–2010) and Vikings (2013–2017).

== Early life ==
Hirst was born in Hackney, East London. She is the daughter of producer and writer Michael Hirst and artist Susan Aldworth, and was primarily raised by her mother. Hirst won a scholarship to the Italia Conti Academy of Theatre Arts in London.

== Career ==
Before appearing on screen, Hirst founded the women-centred production company Tuppence Films. She appeared on the British television series created by her father, playing Kat Ashley in The Tudors, between 2008 and 2010. She starred in another series created by her father, for four seasons between 2013 and 2017 as Helga, wife of Floki, played by Gustaf Skarsgård, in Vikings.

In 2017, after Vikings, Hirst decided to step away from acting and changed life direction by devoting her endeavors to the art of Mindfulness.

== Filmography ==
=== Film ===
Year	Title	Role	Notes
2008	Cash and Curry	Sophie	
2009	Nuryan	Ellie	
2016	The Knock	Carol	Short-film, post-production

=== Television ===
Year	Title	Role	Notes
2008–2010	The Tudors	Kat Ashley	Recurring role, 9 episodes
2013–2017	Vikings	Helga	Recurring role, 39 episodes
2016	Real Vikings	Herself	S1 E2 - "Rise of the Pagans"
