= Michael Hirst (writer) =

English screenwriter and producer

- Born: 21 September 1952 (age 74); Bradford, Yorkshire, England
- Citizenship: British
- Education: University of Nottingham
- Occupations: Screenwriter, producer
- Children: Maude Hirst; Georgia Hirst; Horatio Hirst
- Writing career
- Genre: Historical fiction
- Subject: History of England
- Notable works: Elizabeth (1998); Elizabeth: The Golden Age (2007); The Tudors (2007–2010); Vikings (2013–2020)

Michael Hirst (born 21 September 1952) is an English screenwriter and producer. He is best known for films Elizabeth (1998) and Elizabeth: The Golden Age (2007), and series The Tudors (2007–10) and Vikings (2013–20). Hirst owns Green Pavilion Entertainment, a production company he launched in December 2017.

== Early life ==
Hirst was born in Bradford, West Yorkshire and grew up in Ilkley. He was educated at Bradford Grammar School and attended the London School of Economics. He received a First Class Joint-Honours Degree in English and American Literature from the University of Nottingham and studied Henry James' writings at Trinity College, Oxford.

Hirst was originally going to be an academic, but decided to become a screenwriter after Nicolas Roeg read one of his short stories and asked Hirst to write screenplays for him.

== Career ==
Hirst was head writer, creator, and executive producer of the Showtime television drama series The Tudors which aired from 2007 to 2010. It tells the story of King Henry VIII and his Six Wives as well as his court and the dilemmas throughout his kingdom during his reign.

Hirst is one of the co-writers on the screenplay for the James Dalessandro book, 1906. The story follows a young man who discovers a series of secrets and lies that left San Francisco highly vulnerable to the fires that engulfed it in the aftermath of the 1906 earthquake. Brad Bird was the director; it was released in 2012.

Hirst had been chosen to write the movie adaptation of Stuart Hill's best-selling book: The Cry of the Icemark before it was put on hold and is also set to adapt Bernard Cornwell's book Azincourt, which tells the story of King Henry V of England and the Battle of Agincourt.

In 2011, he co-produced the series Camelot with Chris Chibnall for Starz.

Hirst produced The Borgias television series for Showtime. The Borgias tells the story of the notorious Borgia family. It stars Jeremy Irons as Pope Alexander VI, his first series-regular role. The show was created by Neil Jordan, with filming beginning in the summer of 2010 and ran for three seasons.

Hirst was developing a feature film about Mary Queen of Scots with Working Title Films, to star Saoirse Ronan. The film was further developed without Hirst's involvement and released in 2018, written by Beau Willimon and directed by Josie Rourke.

Premiering in 2013, Hirst created Vikings, the History Channel's first foray into serialised drama. It stars Gabriel Byrne, Travis Fimmel, Clive Standen, Katheryn Winnick, Jessalyn Gilsig, and Gustaf Skarsgård.

In 2019, Hirst began working with writer Jeb Stuart on the sequel to Vikings called Vikings: Valhalla which is set approximately 100 years after the end of Vikings which was released on Netflix on 25 February 2022.

In 2021, Billy the Kid was bought by Epix; Hirst wrote and was executive producer for the series. It premiered on 24 April 2022.

His latest television series Bloodaxe, which he created and wrote with his son Horatio, is set to premiere on Amazon Prime Video on 20 January 2027.

== Personal life ==
His children Maude, Georgia and Horatio Hirst made appearances on his shows. Maude appeared on The Tudors, while both she and her sister Georgia acted on Vikings. In the 2020s, Horatio acted on Vikings: Vallhalla and Billy the Kid, then he made his professional writing debut on Bloodaxe.

== Filmography ==
=== Films ===
Year	Title	Notes
1988	The Deceivers	
1988	Wherever You Are...	
1990	Fools of Fortune	
1991	The Ballad of the Sad Cafe	
1991	Meeting Venus	
1994	Uncovered	
1998	Elizabeth	
2007	Elizabeth: The Golden Age	Also executive producer

=== Television ===
Year	Title	Writer	Executive Producer	Creator	Notes
2002	The Young Casanova	Yes	No	No credit	Television film
2005	Have No Fear: The Life of Pope John Paul II	Yes	No	No credit	Television film
2007–2010	The Tudors	Yes	Yes	Yes	Created and wrote all 38 episodes Executive produced 32 episodes
2011	Camelot	Story	Yes	Yes	Created and executive produced all 10 episodes Wrote story for episode "Homecoming"
2013–2020	Vikings	Yes	Yes	Yes	Created, wrote and executive produced all 89 episodes
2022–2024	Vikings: Valhalla	No	Yes	No	Executive produced all 24 episodes
2022–2025	Billy the Kid	Yes	Yes	Yes	Created, wrote and executive produced all 24 episodes
2027	Bloodaxe	Yes	Yes	Yes	
