= Oistin mac Amlaíb =

King of Dublin (possibly)
- Reign: 873–875
- Predecessor: Ímar
- Died: 875
- Father: Amlaíb Conung

Oistin mac Amlaíb (Old Norse: Eysteinn Óláfsson) was a ninth-century Norse or Norse-Gael leader whom sometimes identified as a King of Dublin. He was a son of Amlaíb Conung and nephew of Ímar, founder of the Uí Ímair dynasty. He is sometimes identified with Thorstein the Red, a figure who features in the Norse sagas.

== Biography ==
The earliest mention of Oistin may be by Cogad Gáedel re Gallaib, which in 873 describes how Bárid mac Ímair and an unnamed son of Amlaíb Conung plundered the caves of Ciarraige. (Note: For a discussion of the historical value of Cogad Gáedel re Gallaib see Ní Mhaonaigh.) This unnamed son of Amlaíb is probably Oistin. Downham suggests this raid undertook as a show of strength; it occurred shortly after the death of Ímar, with Bárid probably succeeding him as King of Dublin. Though Oistin is not named as a king in the annals, it has been suggested by others that Oistin and Bárid ruled together as co-kings after the death of Ímar.

The one and only mention of Oistin by name in contemporary annals is by the Annals of Ulster in 875:

Oistín son of Amlaíb, king of the Norsemen, was deceitfully killed by Albann. (Note: The original Old Irish text makes it clear "king of the Norsemen" refers to Amlaíb, not Oistin.)

"Albann" is generally agreed to be identical to Halfdan Ragnarsson, supposed son of the legendary Viking Ragnar Lodbrok. (Note: The historicity of Ragnar is uncertain and the identification of Ragnar as the father of Halfdan is not to be relied upon.) Some scholars identify Halfdan as a brother of Amlaíb, Ímar, and Auisle, and hence uncle of Oistin. This identification is contingent upon Ímar being identical to Ivar the Boneless: Halfdan and Ivar are named as brothers in the Anglo-Saxon Chronicle. (Note: The identification of Ímar and Ivar as being one and the same is generally agreed upon.) (Note: Another unnamed brother is mentioned in the Anglo-Saxon Chronicle: "...the brother of Ingwar [Ivar] and Healfden [Halfdan] landed in Wessex, in Devonshire, with three and twenty ships, and there was he slain, and eight hundred men with him, and forty of his army. There also was taken the war-flag, which they called the raven.") If Halfdan and Oistin were indeed kin, then it may explain the reason for the conflict: it was a dynastic squabble for control of the kingdom.

== Identification with Thorstein the Red ==
Some have suggested Oistin is the same person as Thorstein the Red, a figure who features in the Norse sagas. However, this is problematic since Thorstein is said to have died in Scotland after conquering much of the country, whereas Oistin is said to have been killed in Ireland in 875 by Albann (i.e. Halfdan). Similarly, Oistin's father Amlaíb is sometimes identified with Olaf the White, a Viking sea-king who also features in the sagas and is named as the father of Thorstein the Red. The sagas are of dubious historical value, but the figures featured within may be based on real people. To get around the problem whereby Oistin and Thorstein die in different places in different circumstances, but keeping the identification of Amlaíb with Olaf the White, it has been proposed that Oistin and Thorstein were brothers.

== Family ==
Amlaíb Conung is identified as Oistin's father by the Annals of Ulster. A brother, Carlus, is mentioned by the Annals of the Four Masters.

A number of other familial connections are known if the identification of Oistin with Thorstein the red is correct. According to the sagas, Aud the Deep-Minded, daughter of Ketil Flatnose, the King of Isles, was the mother of Thorstein. Thorstein's wife is given as Thurid (Þuríður in Old Norse), the daughter of a Geatish man named Eyvind the Easterner. Their children include at least six daughters, Osk, Vigdis, Olof, Thorhild and Thorgerd, and at least one son, Olaf Feilan.
