= Gofraid of Lochlann =

Gofraid
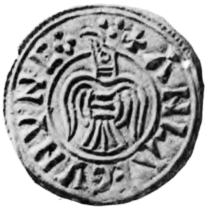
- The viking raven war standard shown on a penny minted in the reign of Amlaíb Cuarán.

King of Lochlann
- Reign: pre-849 – 873?
- Predecessor: Unknown
- Successor: Ímar
- Spouse: Unknown
- Father: "Ragnall son of Gothfraid" (according to the Fragmentary Annals of Ireland)

Gofraid, King of Lochlann was a key figure in the emergence of Norse influence in Scotland and one of the early Kings of the Isles and of that dominated the Irish Sea and environs in the Early Middle Ages. Very little is known of him, including his origins and the nature of his kingdom, although his descendants are well attested in the Irish annals. Speculative connections between these historical figures and characters from the Norse sagas have also been made.

== Life ==
The Fragmentary Annals of Ireland record of Amlaib Conung (Note: The name "Conung" is from the Old Norse konungr and simply means "king".) that in 871 he:

went from Erin to Lochlann to wage war on the Lochlanns, and to aid his father Goffridh, for the Lochlanns had made war against him, his father having come for him.

Frustratingly, the text continues:

Since it would be lengthy to tell the cause of their war, and since it has so little relevance to us, although we have knowledge of it, we forego writing it, for our task is to write about whatever concerns Ireland, and not even all of that; for the Irish suffer evils not only from the Norwegians, but they also suffer many evils from themselves.

These annals also note that in 849:

the sixth year of the reign of Máel Sechlainn, Amlaib Conung, son of the king of Lochlann, came to Ireland, and he brought with him a proclamation of many tributes and taxes from his father, and he departed suddenly. Then his younger brother Imar came after him to levy the same tribute.

This source is then clear that Amlaib is the son of Gofraid, king of Lochlann, although the location of "Lochlann" is the subject of some dispute. This word is often translated as "Norway" although Ó Corráin (1998) argues that Lochlann "is Viking Scotland and probably includes Man" at this time and suggests an early date for an organised Kingdom of the Isles.

The Fragmentary Annals record little else about Gofraid's life but report of 873:

Ég righ Lochlainne .i. Gothfraid do tedmaimm grána opond. Sic quod placuit Deo. (The death of the king of Lochlann i.e. Gothfraid of a sudden and horrible fit. So it pleased God.) (Note: O' Corrain (1998) concludes on p. 37: "This much-emended entry appears to be the death notice of Gøðrøðr, king of the Vikings in Scotland." This is supported by the 1977 CELT translator who offers "The Norwegian king, i.e. Gothfraid, died of a sudden hideous disease." However the Gaelic is translated as simply "The King of the Lochlanns died of an ugly, sudden disease." by O'Donovan and James Henthorn Todd believed this entry referred to the death of Ímar in his translation of Cogad Gaedel re Gallaib. The entry "has caused a great deal of trouble for historians".)

However, according to Downham (2007) "none of these details can be relied upon" as "there is no contemporary evidence to support the statement that [Amlaib's] father was called Gofraid", the Fragmentary Annals having been compiled at an uncertain date, possibly as early as the 11th century. Neither is the dating of the Annals definitive. Nonetheless, Ó Corráin (1998) argues of 873 that "this is no chronological impossibility: his sons first appeared in Ireland 25 years before, very likely in their twenties or younger, and we may infer from this that he may have been in his sixties when he died." He also states that "it is likely that the father of Amlaíb (Óláfr) and Ímar (Ívarr) is Gothfraidh (Guðrøðr) and that he is a historical person and dynastic ancestor."

== Predecessors ==
The Fragmentary Annals note of a date c. 871–872 that "In this year, i.e. the tenth year of the reign of Áed Findliath, Imar son of Gothfraid son of Ragnall son of Gothfraid Conung son of Gofraid and the son of the man who left Ireland, i.e. Amlaib, plundered from west to east, and from south to north." This suggests an ancestry for Gofraid but according to Ó Corráin this reference to "his genealogical ascent is a construct without historical value" and attempts to link the Kings of Lochlann with historical figures in Norway have not proven to be satisfactory.

Alfred Smyth identifies Amlaib as Olaf Geirstad-Alf of Vestfold, which would make Gofraid identical to Gudrød the Hunter, grandfather of Harald Fairhair. However Ó Corráin maintains that there is "no good historical or linguistic evidence to link Lothlend/Laithlind with Norway, and none to link the dynasty of Dublin to the shadowy history of the Ynglings of Vestfold."

== Descendants ==
Uí Ímair dynasts. "Halfdan" is Halfdan Ragnarsson, presumed brother of Ivar the Boneless whose relationship with Ímar son of Gofraid is "doubtful".

In addition to Amlaib Conung, Gofraid had at least two other children, Amlaib's brothers Ímar, the eponymous founder of the Uí Ímair, and Óisle. The Annals of Ulster also note that there was a king of "Laithlinne" whose heir, Thórir, brought an army to Ireland in 848 and who died there in battle. Although there is no specific suggestion that this king was Gofraid this is only the year before the Fragmentary Annals' first record of Amlaib as the king's son.

According to the Fragmentary Annals c. 867:

There was an encounter between Óisle, son of the king of Norway, and Amlaib, his brother. The king had three sons: Amlaib, Imar, and Óisle. Óisle was the least of them in age, but he was the greatest in valor, for he outshone the Irish in casting javelins and in strength with spears. He outshone the Norwegians in strength with swords and in shooting arrows. His brothers loathed him greatly, and Amlaib the most; the causes of the hatred are not told because of their length. The two brothers, Amlaib and Imar, went to consult about the matter of the young lad Óisle; although they had hidden reasons for killing him, they did not bring these up, but instead they brought up other causes for which they ought to kill him; and afterwards they decided to kill him.

When Óisle visited Amlaib the former said:

'Brother, if your wife, i.e. the daughter of Cináed, does not love you, why not give her to me, and whatever you have lost by her, I shall give to you.' When Amlaib heard that, he was seized with great jealousy, and he drew his sword, and struck it into the head of Óisle, his brother, so that he killed him. After that all rose up to fight each other (i.e. the followers of the king, Amlaib, and the followers of the brother who had been killed there); then there were trumpets and battle-cries on both sides.

In 870 Dumbarton was besieged by Amlaib Conung and Ímar, "the two kings of the Northmen", who "returned to Dublin from Britain" the following year with numerous captives. Gofraid may have been succeeded briefly by Ímar who also died in 873. His death is recorded in the Annals of Ulster: Imhar rex Nordmannorum totius Hibernię & Brittanie uitam finiuit (Ímar king of the Norwegian Vikings of the whole of Ireland and Britain ended his life.) Amlaíb died either the following year campaigning in Scotland, or perhaps prior to 872. The matter of Gofraid's descendants and antecedents is subject to some ambiguity based on differing interpretations of these siblings and their connections to legendary figures from the Norse sagas.

=== Ímar ===
The descendants of Ímar include his grandson Ragnall ua Ímair, who was a ruler of Northumbria and Mann (and who may have been the historical prototype of Rognvald Eysteinsson of the Orkneyinga Saga), Sitric Cáech (d. 927) who was a King of Dublin and of York, his successor Amlaíb Cuarán and probably the later Crovan dynasty of Mann and thus of Clann Somhairle, the rulers of Argyll and their descendants the Clan Donald Lords of the Isles.

Ímar has also been identified as the saga character Ivar the Boneless. The latter is referred to in late 11th century Icelandic saga material as a son of the powerful Ragnar Lodbrok. (Note: "The most cruel of them all was Ingvar, the son of Lodbrok, who everywhere tortured Christians to death. This was written in the Gesta of the Franks.") This Ivar had 11 brothers including Halfdan Ragnarsson and Ubba (but not including an Amlaib or Óisle) and is also believed to have died childless. Nor is there any indication in the Irish annals that Ragnar Lodbrok had any Irish connections.

=== Amlaib ===
Amlaib had two sons, Oistin (d. 875) and Carlus (d. 868). Unlike Ímar, no later descendants are recorded but like his brother, he has also been identified as a saga character — Olaf the White.

This Olaf married Aud the Deep-Minded, daughter of Ketil Flatnose and they had a son, Thorstein the Red, whose name is similar to the Irish "Oistin". However, Aud does not appear in the Irish sources and there are various problems with the connection. For example, the Landnámabók has Olaf killed in battle in Ireland, but no Irish source refers to the battle and the Chronicle of the Kings of Alba has Amlaib dying in Pictavia at the hands of Causantín mac Cináeda. The connection has "frequently been proposed and frequently been rejected".
