= Fonder =

Fonder is a surname. Notable people with the surname include:

- George Fonder (1917–1958), American racecar driver
- Mary Jane Fonder (1942–2018), American criminal

== See also ==
- Finder (surname)
