= Find =

Find, FIND or Finding may refer to:

== Computing ==
- find (Unix), a command on UNIX platforms
- find (Windows), a command on DOS/Windows platforms

== Books ==
- The Find (2010), by Kathy Page
- The Find (2014), by William Hope Hodgson

== Film and television ==
- "The Find", an episode of Beyond Belief: Fact or Fiction
- "The Find", an episode of reality TV show The Curse of Oak Island

== Music ==
- Find (Hidden in Plain View EP), 2001
- Find (SS501 EP)
- The Find, a 2005 hip hop album by Ohmega Watts

== People ==
- Áed Find (died 778), king of Dál Riata (modern-day Scotland)
- Caittil Find, Norse-Gaelic warrior contingent leader
- Cumméne Find (died 669), seventh abbot of Iona, Scotland

== Other uses ==
- Find, in archaeology
- Finding (jewelcrafting), jewellery components
- Meteorite find, a found meteorite not observed to have fallen
- Foundation for Innovative New Diagnostics, a not-for-profit organisation
- Facial Images National Database

== See also ==
- Discovery (observation)
- Finder (disambiguation)
- Locate (disambiguation)
- Searching (disambiguation)
- Result (disambiguation)
