= The Finders =

The Finders may refer to:

- The Finders (movement), intentional community and cult founded in Washington, D.C.
- The Finders (Ninjago), characters in Ninjago
- The Finders (novel), 1993 novel

== See also ==
- Finder (disambiguation)
- The Finder (disambiguation)
