= Finder =

Finder may refer to:

- Finder (comics), a comic book series by Carla Speed McNeil
- Finder (manga), a manga series by Ayano Yamane
- Finder (novel), a 1994 novel by Emma Bull
- Finder (software), part of the Apple Macintosh operating system
- Finder (surname)
- Finder (website), an Australian comparison website
- Finder Wyvernspur, a fictional deity of the Forgotten Realms universe
- "Finder", an episode of the animated television series Lilo & Stitch: The Series
- FINDER (Flight Inserted Detector Expandable for Reconnaissance), the name of a miniature UAV (unmanned aerial vehicle)

== See also ==
- The Finder (disambiguation)
- Find (disambiguation)
