= Result =

Final event in a sequence

A result (also called upshot) is the outcome or consequence of a sequence of actions or events. Possible results include gain, injury, value, and victory. Some types of results include the outcome of an action, the final value of a calculation, and the outcome of a vote.

== Description ==
A result is the final consequence of a sequence of actions or events expressed qualitatively or quantitatively. Possible results include advantage, disadvantage, gain, injury, loss, value, and victory.

There may be a range of possible outcomes associated with an event depending on the point of view, historical distance or relevance. Reaching no result can mean that actions are inefficient, ineffective, meaningless or flawed.

== Types ==
Some types of result are as follows:

- in general, the outcome of any kind of research, action or phenomenon
- in games (e.g. cricket, lotteries) or wars, the result includes the identity of the victorious party and possibly the effects on the environment
- in mathematics, the final value of a calculation (e.g. arithmetic operation), function or statistical expression, or the final statement of a theorem that has been proven
- in statistics, any information analyzed, extracted or interpolated from polls, tests or logs
- in computer sciences, the return value of a function, state of a system or list of records matching a query (e.g. web search). The result type is the data type of the data returned by a function.
- in science, the outcome and data concluded from an experiment (e.g. see null hypothesis)
- in forensics and justice, the proof of guilt or innocence of a suspect after evaluating evidence in a criminal investigation
- in economics and accounting, the profit or loss at the end of a fiscal period.
- in democracy, the election of a representative or the outcome of a vote on a subject
- In management and related fields, a result is a piece of information that has certain properties in absolute terms or in relation to previous results or settings
- In chemistry, the result is the final item of a mix
- In Internet search, the results are the list of pages supplied in response to a specific query

== See also ==
- Result (disambiguation)
- Result (cricket)
- Result (schooner) (name of a ship)
- Determinism
- IMRAD (section "Results" in scientific writing)
