= The Finder =

The Finder may refer to:

- The Finder (American TV series), an American procedural drama television series
- The Finder (film), a 2001 Australian film
- Finders Keepers (Australian TV series) (also The Finder), an Australian children's television show

== See also ==
- Finder (disambiguation)
- The Finders (disambiguation)
