= Caittil Find =

Caittil Find (fl. 857) was the leader of a contingent of Norse-Gaels, recorded as being defeated in battle in 857 CE. Some historians have considered him to be identical to Ketill Flatnose, a prominent Norse sea-king who had strong associations with the Hebrides of Scotland and Olaf the White. This view is however not shared by all.

The Annals of Ulster record that in 857 Caittil Find was defeated in battle in Munster, Ireland.

Roiniudh re n-Imar & re n-Amlaiph for Caittil Find cona Gall-Gaedelaibh h-i tiribh Muman.

Ímar and Amlaíb inflicted a rout on Caitil the Fair and his Norse-Irish in the lands of Munster.

The name "Caittil" may be a Gaelicisation of the Old Norse "Ketill". Ketill was a popular name at this period and it is not clear whether the Gaelic Caittil even represents this Norse name. Caittil's byname means "white" (or "fair") not "flat-nosed", as Alex Woolf points out.

Nor do the Icelandic sources which document Ketill hint at his being active in Ireland. Ketill was the father-in-law of Olaf the White, yet Caittil is recorded as battling Amlaíb (≈Olaf the White). Other historians propose that Caittil may have been active in Wales prior to his coming to Ireland.
