= Vikings season 5 =

Season of television series

Vikings
- Season 5
- DVD cover arts for part 1 (top) and part 2 (bottom)
- Starring: Katheryn Winnick; Gustaf Skarsgård; Alexander Ludwig; Peter Franzén; Jasper Pääkkönen; Moe Dunford; Alex Høgh; Marco Ilsø; Jordan Patrick Smith; Jonathan Rhys Meyers; John Kavanagh
- No. of episodes: 20

Release
- Original network: History
- Original release: November 29, 2017 – January 24, 2018
- Original release: November 28, 2018 – January 30, 2019

Season chronology
- ← Previous; Season 4 Next → Season 6

The fifth season of the historical drama television series Vikings premiered on November 29, 2017, on History in Canada. The series broadly follows the exploits of the legendary Viking chieftain Ragnar Lothbrok and his crew, and later those of his sons.

The fifth season consists of a double-season order of twenty episodes, split into two parts of ten episodes each; the first part concluded on January 24, 2018. The second half premiered on November 28, 2018. The premise of the fifth season differs from the previous four after the departure of Travis Fimmel as Ragnar, and it follows the adventures of his living sons. Jonathan Rhys Meyers is introduced as a main character, after his initial appearance in the fourth season's finale. The season concluded in its entirety on January 30, 2019.

== Cast ==
=== Main ===
- Katheryn Winnick as Queen Lagertha, a shield-maiden and Ragnar's ex-wife; she is the queen of Kattegat.
- Gustaf Skarsgård as Floki, a gifted shipbuilder
- Alexander Ludwig as Bjorn Ironside, Ragnar and Lagertha's son and Torvi's husband
- Peter Franzén as King Harald Finehair, a Viking ambitious to become the first King of Norway
- Jasper Pääkkönen as Halfdan the Black, Harald's violent younger brother (part 1)
- Moe Dunford as King Aethelwulf of Wessex (part 1)
- Alex Høgh as King Ivar the Boneless, fourth son of Ragnar and Aslaug; he becomes king of Kattegat.
- Marco Ilsø as Hvitserk, second son of Ragnar and Aslaug
- Jordan Patrick Smith as Ubbe, eldest son of Ragnar and Aslaug
- Jonathan Rhys Meyers as Bishop Heahmund, a Christian warrior priest
- John Kavanagh as The Seer, the seiðrmann of Kattegat

Special appearances by

- Clive Standen as Duke Rollo, a warrior and Ragnar's brother; he was granted the title of Duke of Normandy by Emperor Charles.

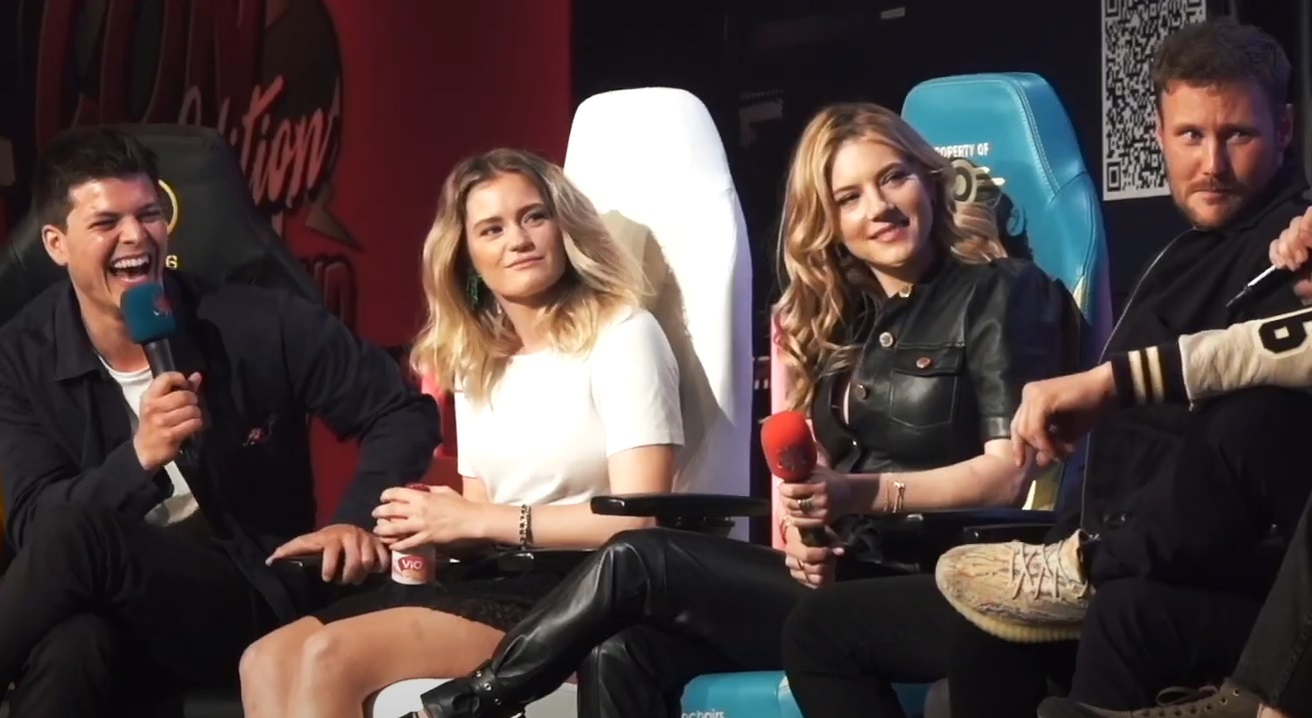
Vikings (4 of cast) German Comic Con 2022

Three main characters who died in previous seasons briefly appear played by body doubles: Sigurd's corpse is briefly shown in "The Fisher King", King Ecbert appears in "The Fisher King" as a corpse and in "Baldur" as a cloaked figure, and Athelstan is seen as a cloaked figure in "The Departed".

=== Recurring ===
- Josefin Asplund as Queen Astrid, Lagertha's lover and, later King Harald's wife
- Ida Marie Nielsen as Margrethe, Ubbe's wife
- Ferdia Walsh-Peelo as Prince/King Alfred, Queen Judith and Athelstan's son
- Georgia Hirst as Torvi, wife of Bjorn and, later, wife of Ubbe
- Jennie Jacques as Queen Judith of Northumbria, daughter of King Aelle, wedded to King Aethelwulf
- Jonathan Delaney Tynan as Lord/Bishop Cuthred, a nobleman of Wessex and, later, Bishop of Sherborne
- Keith McErlean as Lord Denewulf, a nobleman in service of Bishop Heahmund
- Darren Cahill as Prince Aethelred, Queen Judith and King Aethelwulf's son
- Ben Roe as Guthrum, Jarl Borg and Torvi's son
- Kieran O'Reilly as White Hair, Ivar's chief bodyguard
- Frankie McCafferty as Sindric, a polyglot drifter
- Alicia Agneson as Queen Freydis, Ivar's former slave, love interest and, later, queen of Kattegat
- Albano Jerónimo as Euphemius, a Byzantine commander
- Karima McAdams as Kassia, a Byzantine abbess
- Paul Reid as Mannel, Queen Judith's cousin and Princess Elsewith's father
- Khaled Abol Naga as Emir Ziyadat Allah, an Arab ruler
- Adam Copeland as Kjetill Flatnose (/ʃjetil/), a violent and bold warrior who joins Floki's expedition to set up a colony
- Kris Holden-Ried as Eyvind (/eɪvɪnd/), a Viking of Kattegat who also joins Floki's expedition
- Leah McNamara as Aud the Deep-Minded (/eɪθ/), Kjetill Flatnose and Ingvild's daughter
- Jack McEvoy as Helgi the Lean, Eyvind and Rafarta's son, who is married to Thorunn
- Mei Bignall as Thorunn, Kjetill Flatnose and Ingvild's daughter and Helgi's wife
- Kelly Campbell as Ingvild, Kjetill Flatnose's wife
- James Craze as Bul, Eyvind and Rafarta's son
- Elijah Rowen as Asbjorn, Eyvind and Rafarta's son
- Donna Dent as Rafarta, Eyvind's wife
- Rob Malone as Thorgrim, Kjetill Flatnose and Ingvild's son
- Scott Graham as Frodi, Kjetill Flatnose and Ingvild's son
- Tallulah Belle Earley as Jorunn, Eyvind and Rafarta's daughter
- Ryan Henson as Hali, Bjorn and Torvi's son
- Svea Killoran as Asa, Bjorn and Torvi's daughter
- Anthony Brophy as King Svase, a Sami chief and an ally of Lagertha
- Dagny Backer Johnsen as Princess Snæfrid, Svase's daughter
- Malcolm Douglas as Lord Cyneheard, a nobleman of Wessex
- Róisín Murphy as Princess/Queen Elsewith, Mannel's daughter and King Alfred's wife
- Damien Devaney as Wilfred, a nobleman and Princess Elsewith's steward
- Dean Ridge as Magnus, Queen Kwenthrith's son and alleged son of Ragnar
- Tomi May as Jarl Olavsonn, Ivar's commander in York
- Ragga Ragnars as Gunnhild, Olavsonn's wife and, later, Bjorn's wife
- Eve Connolly as Thora, Hvitserk's love interest
- Ann Skelly as Lady Ethelfled, Lord Cuthred's daughter and Prince Aethelred's wife
- Steven Berkoff as King Olaf the Stout, a Norwegian king
- Erik Madsen as King Hemming, a leader of the Black Danes confederation
- Markjan Winnick as King Angantyr, a leader of the Black Danes confederation
- Gavan Ó Connor Duffy as King Frodo, a leader of the Black Danes confederation
- Kristy Dawn Dinsmore as Amma, a shield-maiden in Harald's army

=== Guest ===
- India Mullen as Aethegyth, a noblewoman of Wessex
- Frank Prendergast as Bishop Cynebert of York
- Laurence O'Fuarain as Hakon, a whale hunter of Vestfold
- Bosco Hogan as Lord Abbot of Lindisfarne
- Mabel Hurley as young Lagertha, appearing in a flashback
- Ross Matthew Anderson as Lagertha's father, appearing in a flashback
- Ben McKeown as Crowbone, a Viking warrior at York
- Conn Rogers as Canute, a member of King Olaf's court
- Jamie Maclachlan as Aldwin, a Saxon commander
- Martin Maloney as Vigrid, one of Ivar's men

== Episodes ==
No. overall	No. in season	Title	Directed by	Written by	Original release date
Part 1
50	1	"The Fisher King" (Note: The first two episodes aired together on History as a two-hour premiere, "The Departed", but were released separately on streaming services and in digital stores, with the first part titled "The Fisher King" and the second "The Departed".)	David Wellington	Michael Hirst	November 29, 2017
After Sigurd's death, Ubbe, Ivar and Hvitserk rule jointly over their newly acquired land in East Anglia. Bjorn and Halfdan sail back to the Mediterranean Sea; Floki sets sail for the unknown; King Harald heads back to Kattegat. Meanwhile, Bishop Heahmund arrives at King Ecbert's villa, celebrates the late sovereign's funeral, and begins rebuilding the place. Aethelwulf and Judith are in exile with princes Aethelred and Alfred, the latter struck by sickness. Ivar persuades his brothers to go north and conquer the city of York. In Kattegat, Lagertha suggests that Harald was expecting to find Egil in her place, so he could take over the kingdom. Harald confesses and dares her to kill him.
51	2	"The Departed"	David Wellington	Michael Hirst	November 29, 2017
After days at sea, Floki finally reaches land, which he believes to be Asgard, the land of the Gods. In Kattegat, Harald is held prisoner by Lagertha. He proposes an alliance with her through marriage, but she refuses and rapes him. Harald's men free him and capture Astrid; they leave Kattegat and Harald offers Astrid the same proposition that he had to Lagertha. Prince Alfred has a vision in which Athelstan tells him the Vikings are in York, so King Aethelwulf joins forces with Bishop Heahmund. In York, Ivar shows his brothers that he can now stand and walk on his own feet with the help of new leg braces and a crutch.
52	3	"Homeland"	Steve Saint Leger	Michael Hirst	December 6, 2017
Floki explores the new land he has encountered. In Norway, Astrid tempts Harald with the possibility of her alliance, while resisting his sexual advances. In the Mediterranean, Sindric advises Bjorn to arrive as a trader, with a few ships, and not as a warrior in command of an entire fleet. In England, the Saxons led by King Aethelwulf and Bishop Heahmund attack York, but are led into a trap. Aethelwulf's son Aethelred is wounded and the Saxons are forced to retreat. Ubbe and Hvitserk propose a peace, but Ivar wants to continue the war. Aethelwulf seemingly accepts their offer, but Heahmund arranges to have the brothers humiliated. With Ubbe having lost face, Ivar secures his position as the leader of the Great Army. Ubbe and Hvitserk prepare to leave for Kattegat with their few followers; however, at the last minute, Hvitserk defects to join Ivar.
53	4	"The Plan"	Steve Saint Leger	Michael Hirst	December 13, 2017
Bjorn reaches Sicily, and agrees to act as bodyguard to its commander Euphemius. However, Sindric discovers that Euphemius is merely a client of the Arab Emir Ziyadat Allah, and Bjorn asks to visit him. Euphemius refuses but is persuaded to agree by Kassia, a famous nun, and they set sail for Kairouan in North Africa. Meanwhile, in Kattegat, Ubbe agrees to ally with Lagertha against both Ivar and Harald. In Vestfold, Astrid finally agrees to Harald's proposal, and they are married. Floki asks the gods for permission to bring settlers to his new land and prepares to sail. Outside York, the Saxons are joined by Judith's cousin Mannel and his men from Northumbria. Heahmund persuades Aethelwulf to lay siege, and attack only when the Vikings are starving. Inside York, the Vikings pretend to burn bodies, and Ivar humiliates Hvitserk by not sharing his plan. Aethelwulf and Heahmund see the smoke from the fires and enter the apparently deserted city; Heahmund is concerned that there are rats above ground.
54	5	"The Prisoner"	Ciarán Donnelly	Michael Hirst	December 20, 2017
In York, Saxon celebrations are cut short when Vikings appear from the sewers and engage in battle. Heahmund is surrounded, but spared by Ivar, and captured. The Vikings retake and garrison the city, as the Saxons retreat. Ivar and Hvitserk sail for Kattegat, taking Heahmund with them. In North Africa, Bjorn travels by caravan across the desert to meet Emir Ziyadat Allah, who welcomes him and offers to trade. Euphemius disappears and, at a banquet, the Emir explains that he had defected to support the Emperor and has now been captured and executed. The Vikings realise that Euphemius is the meal they are eating and that Kassia is more powerful than she seems. Bjorn, Halfdan and Sindric are arrested and are about to be executed as a sandstorm approaches. Meanwhile, Floki returns to Kattegat with tales of his fabulous new land and recruits settlers to return, despite Lagertha forbidding him to take her warriors away.
55	6	"The Message"	Ciarán Donnelly	Michael Hirst	December 27, 2017
Floki and the settlers prepare for their voyage but are betrayed to Lagertha, who is angry but lets them sail. On reaching the new land, the settlers discover that it is not as fertile as Floki had told them. Margrethe is vexed by Lagertha's leadership; the Queen threatens to enslave her again if she continues to plot against her. In England, the Saxons have retreated; Alfred swears at Ecbert's grave to pursue the former King's vision of uniting the country. After collapsing during Mass, Alfred recovers and decides to make a pilgrimage to Lindisfarne. Ivar returns to meet Harald, and makes an alliance with him; they plan to attack Kattegat in two months' time. Ivar threatens and persuades Heahmund to fight with them. Astrid betrays Harald by bribing Hakon, a fisherman, to warn Lagertha. She is blackmailed and raped by the crew, spied by a young boy. Hakon delivers the warning. Meanwhile, in North Africa, Bjorn manages to escape during the sandstorm with Halfdan and Sindric, and the three sail back to Kattegat.
56	7	"Full Moon"	Jeff Woolnough	Michael Hirst	January 3, 2018
Alfred reaches Lindisfarne, in search of the memory of his father, and hears his voice as he prays. Floki and the settlers begin creating a settlement near hot springs in their new land. Floki proposes a co-operative, democratic approach, but Eyvind does not trust him and accuses Floki of wanting to be King. Astrid tells Harald that she is pregnant, while Ivar and Heahmund discuss their plan of attack. Bjorn returns to Kattegat, where Lagertha has allied with King Svase of the Sámi. Bjorn rejects Torvi and proposes to marry Snæfrid, Svase's daughter. Lagertha and her allies discuss how to respond to Ivar's attack, and decide to meet him in battle on land, assuming that he will not attack the town from the sea. Margrethe continues to urge Ubbe to betray Lagertha, so that when she is defeated, he can become King.
57	8	"The Joke"	Jeff Woolnough	Michael Hirst	January 10, 2018
Alfred returns from Lindisfarne, and argues that the Saxons must build a navy as the only way to stop further Viking incursions. In the new land, Floki proposes building a temple to Thor, but is opposed by Eyvind who warns that they all will starve come winter. Meanwhile, the armies of Lagertha, Bjorn, and Ubbe, and of Harald, Ivar, and Hvitserk, meet above Kattegat. Lagertha proposes peace talks, but Harald, then Ivar, reject a settlement. Before battle, Ivar takes Astrid and a third of their army towards shore, to protect their fleet. Hvitserk and his group try to flank, but are ambushed in the forest by the Sámi. Battle begins, and Bjorn and Lagertha gain the upper hand, as Harald's forces are outflanked. Ivar hears the fighting, but says it is too late to help. Heahmund is wounded, and Harald retreats. Lagertha refuses to kill Heahmund and orders that his life be saved.
58	9	"A Simple Story"	Daniel Grou	Michael Hirst	January 17, 2018
In the aftermath of the battle, Heahmund recovers, makes advances and pledges loyalty to Lagertha. Hvitserk secures reinforcements from Rollo, on condition that Bjorn's life is spared. Bjorn seeks peace with Ivar and Harald, but is rejected; Ivar moves to have him killed but is stopped by Harald. Ubbe, regretting marrying Margrethe, seeks solace with Torvi and the two have an affair. In Wessex, Aethelwulf dies and Judith persuades Aethelred to reject the throne and instead propose to the Witan that Alfred become king. In Floki's colony, Thor's temple is completed, but set afire and destroyed. Thorgrim, Kjetill's son, accuses Bul, Eyvind's son, of the arson. In the ensuing struggle, Thorgrim stabs Bul to death.
59	10	"Moments of Vision"	Daniel Grou	Michael Hirst	January 24, 2018
In Floki's colony, Floki urges Eyvind to not seek revenge for Bul's death, offering to make him lawgiver, in exchange for not starting a blood feud. When Thorgrim is found dead, Floki proposes that he himself be sacrificed to the gods. In Kattegat, Margrethe meets the Seer and reveals her ambitions to become queen. The Seer calls her mad and predicts that she will never be queen of Kattegat. The army of Lagertha faces those of Ivar and Harald. As they do battle, Hvitserk remembers Ivar accusing him of regret for his defection. Hvitserk faces Ubbe on the battlefield, but Ubbe is unable to hurt his brother. Hvitserk kills Guthrum, while Svase and Snæfrid are killed by Harald's warriors. Astrid finds Lagertha and asks her to kill her, fearing her pregnancy. Lagertha reluctantly complies. Harald kills his brother Halfdan. As Ivar orders the Frankish reserves onto the field, Lagertha and Bjorn retreat. As Bjorn prepares to leave Kattegat, he finds Lagertha broken with her hair turned white. Across the fjord, Rollo arrives.
Part 2
60	11	"The Revelation"	Ciarán Donnelly	Michael Hirst	November 28, 2018
Ivar enters Kattegat and declares himself its new king. Ivar and Hvitserk celebrate their victory; Harald is mourning Astrid and is haunted by his murder of Halfdan. Rollo arrives and Ivar tells him that Lagertha, Bjorn, and Ubbe have vanished. Rollo guesses that they are hiding in the same hut he had sought shelter in decades earlier. Rollo urges Lagertha and Bjorn to return with him to Frankia, revealing himself to be Bjorn's biological father. Bjorn rejects both Rollo's offer and Rollo as his father. Ivar finds the hut, but Lagertha and her followers have already left, leaving a crazed Margrethe behind. They steal a boat and sail for England. Meanwhile, in Iceland the settlers vote on whether to sacrifice Floki; Eyvind's son Helgi gives the deciding vote against. In Wessex, King Alfred proposes having church services in English instead of Latin, alienating the clergy. Judith suggests that Alfred must marry and produce an heir to secure his position. Lagertha arrives in Wessex and is soon captured by Aethelred.
61	12	"Murder Most Foul"	Ciarán Donnelly	Michael Hirst	December 5, 2018
At Heahmund's suggestion, Lagertha, Bjorn, and Ubbe are to be allowed to settle in East Anglia in return for fighting against other Viking incursions. Heahmund is informed that his bishopric has been given to Cuthred, due to Heahmund being assumed dead. In Kattegat, Ivar is engaged to Freydis. When his impotence prevents him from having sex with her, Freydis consumes Ivar's blood, claiming this will make her conceive, but she then secretly has sex with Ivar's slave. In the colony, Frodi blames Eyvind's son Asbjorn for Thorgrim's death, while Floki tells Aud of his fear that his visions were due to insanity. In Wessex, Alfred implores Ubbe to convert to Christianity. Meanwhile, Alfred ignores his intended bride Ealhswith, who starts an affair with Bjorn. Ivar has a disturbing dream involving Margrethe, and then has her killed. Cuthred's spies discover Lagertha and Heahmund's affair. When Cuthred confronts him and threatens to tell Alfred, Heahmund murders Cuthred.
62	13	"A New God"	Ciarán Donnelly	Michael Hirst	December 12, 2018
Ubbe and Torvi agree to Alfred's demand for their conversion, but this alienates Bjorn. Bjorn is approached by and bonds with Magnus, who seeks vengeance against Alfred. Alfred and Aethelred clash over whether to punish Heahmund for Cuthred's murder. Alfred chooses to leave judgement of Heahmund to God, to the dismay of his nobles. Heahmund spreads the story that Aethelred might be leader of a conspiracy against Alfred. Harald leaves Kattegat for York to prepare a raid on Wessex. He manipulates Ivar's governor Olavsonn into supporting him in his future plan to invade Kattegat. In Iceland, Floki manages to unite the feuding families over the expected child of Helgi and Thorunn, a daughter of Kjetill. However, soon afterwards Thorunn vanishes. In Kattegat, Hvitserk is furious about Margrethe's murder. Ivar, fuelled by Freydis's promises and flattery, declares himself a god and tells Hvitserk that he intends to perform a great sacrifice.
63	14	"The Lost Moment"	Steve Saint Leger	Michael Hirst	December 19, 2018
Ivar has a shield-maiden he claims to be Lagertha sacrificed, as Hvitserk becomes increasingly conflicted. As Ivar executes rebels, Hvitserk consults the Seer who offers fearful visions of the future. In Iceland, Floki is visited by a vision of Thorunn who reveals her murder by Helgi's brother, Asbjorn. Floki exiles Eyvind and his family from the colony. In England, Ubbe trains Alfred in preparation for Harald's raid. Magnus suggests to Bjorn, Ubbe, and Lagertha that they should join Harald. Ubbe and Lagertha do not believe Magnus's claim about being Ragnar's son. As Harald's army approaches Wessex, Harald becomes attracted to Olavsonn's wife Gunnhild. Aethelred is instructed by the conspiring nobles to assassinate Alfred, but when the moment comes, finds himself unable to perform the deed. Ivar eventually visits the Seer, asking him to confirm his divinity. When the Seer does not comply, Ivar murders him.
64	15	"Hell"	Steve Saint Leger	Michael Hirst	December 26, 2018
Ivar has his men covertly cremate the Seer's body, while publicly promising to bring the people responsible to justice. In England, Heahmund has a vision of Hell that drives him to renounce Lagertha, who accuses Heahmund of never having loved her. Alfred has Lord Cyneheard arrested for treason and Judith tortures him for information about the conspiracy. Harald's army arrives in Wessex. Ubbe goes to speak with Harald, offering a large sum of money for him to leave. Later Magnus arrives to join Harald, inadvertently alerting him that Ubbe and Alfred have set a trap. Harald's army, cut off by a fire started by Ubbe, charges the English. The English take the upper hand, killing Jarl Olavsonn. The Vikings are driven back, but not before Gunnhild kills a wounded Heahmund and injures Bjorn, before being taken captive. In the chaos, Lagertha vanishes. As Alfred celebrates his victory, Judith informs him that Aethelred is leader of the conspiracy.
65	16	"The Buddha"	Steve Saint Leger	Michael Hirst	January 2, 2019
Alfred tells Judith that he has forgiven Aethelred. She confronts Aethelred, who says that loyalty to Alfred prevented him from leading the conspiracy. News reaches Ivar of Harald's defeat, and Ivar plans his own invasion of Wessex. Meanwhile, Alfred grants the Norsemen East Anglia; Bjorn is unhappy about Ubbe and Torvi's conversion to Christianity. With Gunnhild, he travels north to make a deal with Harald, after Gunnhild reveals his plan to attack Kattegat. Hvitserk meets a merchant and becomes interested in Buddhism. Helgi returns to the settlement with frostbite and news that Eyvind is sick and remorseful. Kjetill decides to lead a rescue expedition. In York, Bjorn is welcomed by Harald and Magnus; but when Harald realises Bjorn and Gunnhild are in a relationship, he is unhappy. Alfred becomes sick and bedridden. Judith's paranoia about Aethelred escalates, and she poisons him to death.
66	17	"The Most Terrible Thing"	Helen Shaver	Michael Hirst	January 9, 2019
Aethelred is buried as Alfred regains his health. Judith reveals that she had poisoned him to death; Alfred is furious but Judith maintains that doing terrible things is necessary to stay in power. Hearing that a large fleet of Danes is approaching Wessex, Ubbe convinces the king to make him leader of his army. In York, Harald makes the same deal with Bjorn that he had with Ivar: when Bjorn dies, Kattegat will be Harald's. Harald approaches Gunnhild in private and admits his feelings; Gunnhild implies she will marry Harald when he is king of Norway. In Kattegat, Ivar grows anxious about Hvitserk, and forces him to go on a diplomatic mission to his ally Olaf the Stout. In Iceland, the rescue party finds Eyvind and his family in a terrible state. While Floki is held at knifepoint, Kjetill and Frodi massacre them. Floki begs for Helgi's life, but Kjetill decapitates the latter and places his head on a spike. When the group returns home, Floki recounts the bloodbath, and Aud throws herself into Gullfoss.
67	18	"Baldur"	Helen Shaver	Michael Hirst	January 16, 2019
King Olaf asks Hvitserk about Ivar's rule; Hvitserk declares his brother a tyrant and asks Olaf to help overthrow him. An amused Olaf instead has Hvitserk tortured. Nevertheless, Hvitserk refuses to change his mind about Ivar. Impressed, Olaf decides to support him. In Kattegat, Ivar orders Thora's arrest and accuses her of fomenting hatred toward him; she contends that in Ragnar's time, all were free. Ivar lets her leave, but she is soon taken by his soldiers and burned alive, along with other rebels. Freydis gives birth to Ivar's "son" Baldur. The child is deformed and Ivar puts him out in the wood, not wanting him to have a life like his. In England, Judith seeks treatment from a witch for a tumor. In the witch's hut, Judith finds a feral Lagertha, whom she takes back to the royal villa. Ubbe talks with the leaders of "the black danes", kings Hemming, Angantyr, and Frodo, offering them settlement in East Anglia. When Frodo refuses, Ubbe challenges him to single combat. In Iceland, Floki buries Aud and leaves the colony to confront the gods in the wilderness. He eventually finds a cave that he believes is the Helgrind, and enters it.
68	19	"What Happens in the Cave"	David Wellington	Michael Hirst	January 23, 2019
In England, King Alfred's mother, Judith, dies from cancer. Ubbe fights King Frodo and wins, but is badly injured. As he is about to die, Ubbe calls Odin for help. Because of Ubbe, the war is prevented and Kings Hemming and Angantyr settle in East Anglia with their people. Meanwhile, Lagertha is recalling what happened to her after the battle. She remembers that the witch cut her hair and told her she would then be a new person. Ubbe and Lagertha leave England for Kattegat. In Kattegat, Freydis confronts Ivar about her missing son and he strikes her. Bjorn, King Harald, and their army sail through a storm to reach Norway. Harald is frustrated by Bjorn's behaviour and a deadly confrontation is only prevented by Gunnhild. While marching toward Kattegat with King Olaf and his army, Hvitserk is reunited with Bjorn. Ivar changes his plans and decides to stay in Kattegat to confront his brothers. In the cave, Floki finally finds a cross planted in the ground. He begins to laugh as the volcano erupts and injures him.
69	20	"Ragnarok"	David Wellington	Michael Hirst	January 30, 2019
The combined armies attack the walls of Kattegat from two directions. However, the defenses are too strong and they are forced back. Magnus is killed by Ivar's captain White Hair. Bjorn appeals to the citizens and says that Ivar is their enemy. At night while Ivar celebrates his victory, Freydis sneaks out to the attackers' camp. She exposes Ivar's murder of Baldur and Thora and a hidden door. A second assault begins and most of the defenders give no resistance, leaving Ivar's housecarls outnumbered and defeated. Harald is seriously wounded while saving Bjorn's life. Freydis reveals her betrayal to Ivar, who strangles her. When Bjorn and Hvitserk enter the hall, Ivar has vanished. Bjorn is declared king by Olaf and a returning Lagertha. Bjorn has a vision of the Seer, who tells him that the war is not over. In the hills, Ivar and his remaining followers travel east.

== Production ==
=== Development ===
An Irish-Canadian co-production presented by Metro-Goldwyn-Mayer, the fifth season of Vikings was developed and produced by TM Productions and Take 5 Productions. Morgan O'Sullivan, Sheila Hockin, Sherry Marsh, Alan Gasmer, James Flynn, John Weber, and Michael Hirst are credited as executive producers. This season was produced by Keith Thompson for the first four and last four episodes, and Liz Gill for the fifth to sixteenth episodes. Bill Goddard and Séamus McInerney are co-producers.

The production team for this season includes casting directors Frank and Nuala Moiselle, costume designer Susan O'Connor Cave, visual effects supervisor Dominic Remane, stunt action designer Richard Ryan, composer Trevor Morris, production designer Mark Geraghty, editors Aaron Marshall for the first, third, fifth, tenth, fourteenth, seventeenth and twentieth episodes, Tad Seaborn for the second, fourth, sixth, eighth, thirteenth, sixteenth and nineteenth episodes, Michele Conroy for the seventh, ninth and eleventh episodes, Dan Briceno for the twelfth episode, and Don Cassidy for the fifteenth and eighteenth episodes and cinematographers PJ Dillon for the first and second episodes, Peter Robertson for the third, fourth, and seventh to sixteenth episodes, Suzie Lavelle for the fifth, sixth, seventeenth and eighteenth episodes, and Owen McPolin for the nineteenth and twentieth episodes.

=== Casting ===
At the same time that the series was renewed for a fifth season, it was announced that Irish actor Jonathan Rhys Meyers would be joining the cast, as Heahmund, a "warrior bishop". Vikings creator Michael Hirst, explained: "I was looking at the history books, and I came across these warrior bishops. The antecedents of the Knights Templar: these are people who were absolutely religious, yet they put on armor and they fought. Don't let their priestly status fool you, either. They were crazy! They believed totally in Christianity and the message, and yet, on the battlefield, they were totally berserk."

Former WWE star Adam Copeland was cast in a recurring role for the fifth season, as Kjetill Flatnose, a violent and bold warrior. He is chosen by Floki to join an expedition to set up a colony in a new land. Irish actor Darren Cahill plays the role of Aethelred in the fifth season. Nigerian actor Stanley Amuzie told local media he had landed a small role in the fifth season. The fifth season also includes Irish actor, musician and real-life police detective, Kieran O'Reilly, who plays the role of White Hair. In April 2017 it was announced that Danish actor Erik Madsen had joined the cast for the fifth season, as King Hemming. He spent several months of 2016 on the set of The Last Kingdom, portraying a Viking.

=== Filming ===
As with previous seasons, most of the season was shot at Ashford Studios with most exteriors filmed around County Wicklow.

Scenes taking place in Sicily and Egypt were shot at Atlas Corporation Studios in Morocco. Floki's landing on Iceland was filmed in Vík í Mýrdal. The rest of the scenes in Iceland were shot on Ireland with digital backdrops.

=== Music ===
The Vikings V (Music from the TV Series)

Soundtrack album by Trevor Morris
- Released: December 27, 2019
- Genre: Soundtrack
- Length: 171:26
- Label: Sony Classical Records

The musical score for the fifth season was composed by Trevor Morris in collaboration with Einar Selvik. The opening sequence is again accompanied by the song "If I Had a Heart" by Fever Ray.

The soundtrack album was released on December 27, 2019, by Sony Classical Records. An additional original song not included in the album is "Skidarima", written and performed by Einar Selvik and featured in "Homeland".

Additional non-original music by Norwegian music group Wardruna is featured in the episodes "The Plan" and "A Simple Story". The featured tracks are "MannaR - Drivande", "Løyndomsriss", and "Heimta Thurs".

Track listing
No.	Title	Length
1.	"Mourning the Fallen"	01:23
2.	"Heahmund Holds Funeral"	01:06
3.	"Beg for Mercy"	00:42
4.	"Vikings Attack"	02:07
5.	"Showing No Mercy"	02:32
6.	"Sword Practice"	00:47
7.	"Marriage Proposal"	01:55
8.	"Visions of Destiny"	02:22
9.	"Brave New World"	03:22
10.	"Visions of Loki"	02:03
11.	"Exploring a New World"	01:15
12.	"Sacrificial Dreams"	01:55
13.	"Saxons"	02:56
14.	"To War"	03:29
15.	"Chasing Destiny"	02:03
16.	"Lagertha Visits the Seer"	01:19
17.	"Ivar's Plan"	02:27
18.	"Attack Preparations"	01:29
19.	"Vikings Ambush"	04:57
20.	"Aftermath"	01:08
21.	"Making Love"	01:38
22.	"An Invitation to Destiny"	01:59
23.	"Bjorn Captured"	01:31
24.	"Prayer for a Grave"	00:58
25.	"Hakon Delivers the Message"	01:16
26.	"Voyeurs"	02:15
27.	"Viking Comforts"	02:27
28.	"What is Free Will?"	02:45
29.	"What is Trust?"	03:34
30.	"War Planning"	01:25
31.	"The Battle Begins"	01:27
32.	"Retreat"	02:49
33.	"Bee Sting"	03:24
34.	"Dreams of Battle"	01:20
35.	"Imminent Threat"	01:35
36.	"I Can't Kill You"	01:48
37.	"Farewell to Loved Ones"	00:51
38.	"One Man Army"	01:36
39.	"Visions and Death"	03:40
40.	"Visions of Death"	02:38
41.	"Overpowered"	01:36
42.	"The Return"	01:01
43.	"Trade Negotiations"	02:03
44.	"Rollo Offers to Save Bjorn and Lagertha"	03:59
45.	"Negotiations Continue"	02:27
46.	"Discussions of Titles and Land"	03:38
47.	"The Impossible Promise"	01:46
48.	"Whispers of Baptism"	01:27
49.	"Sexual Suspicions"	01:11
50.	"Sexual Observations"	01:21
51.	"Freydis Protects a Secret"	01:23
52.	"Baptism"	01:36
53.	"Ivar the God"	03:39
54.	"Hvitserk Visits the Seer"	01:30
55.	"Another Son?"	01:48
56.	"A Dark Death"	02:19
57.	"Justice for the Seer"	02:13
58.	"The Memory of Battle"	03:56
59.	"Recounting the real Battle"	02:47
60.	"Death on the Battlefield"	02:49
61.	"Confession to Conspiracy"	01:28
62.	"Spiritual Healing"	01:51
63.	"The Reality of Loss"	01:29
64.	"Personal Attacks"	01:54
65.	"The Cliff of Choice"	01:39
66.	"Ivar Questions"	02:05
67.	"Hvitserk tells Olaf of Ivar's Cruelty"	02:19
68.	"A Quiet Dinner"	01:36
69.	"Entering the Mouth of Hell"	01:21
70.	"Ivar Confronts"	01:30
71.	"Reflections on Fate"	02:06
72.	"Old Gods"	02:17
73.	"Ivar's Speech"	02:38
74.	"The Story of Ragnarok"	02:24
75.	"Armies Take Their Positions"	01:55
76.	"Attack on the Wall"	06:35
77.	"Failing Assault"	02:36
78.	"Murder Most Foul"	01:47
79.	"The Sword of Kings"	02:15
80.	"Destiny Fulfilled"	02:59
Total length:		171:26

== Reception ==
=== Critical response ===
The review aggregator website Rotten Tomatoes reported a 91% approval rating, with an average rating of 8.10/10 based on 11 reviews. The consensus reads: "Brutal battles and epic quests help Vikings' fifth season remain an engaging, exciting journey." IGN awarded episode 10, "Moments of Vision", with a rating of 9 out of 10. Entertainment Weekly gave the episode an "A".

The second half of the season drew some criticism. Writing in Forbes, Erik Kain said: "the show continues to falter, an unfortunate mix of melodrama, one-note characters and absurd fantasy parading as historical fiction" and that the show "has simply lost its way". In "A Simple Story", Aethelred is portrayed rejecting the throne in favour of his younger brother Alfred. In history, after the death of Aethelwulf, three of Alfred's elder brothers ruled, for two, five and six years respectively, all dying before Alfred took the throne in 871. Writing in Forbes, Erik Kain described the storyline as "just a huge unforced error".
