= Result (disambiguation) =

A result is the outcome of an event.

Result or Results may also refer to:

== Music ==
- Results (album), a 1989 album by Liza Minnelli
- Results, a 2012 album by Murder Construct
- "The Result", a single by The Upsetters
- "The Result", a song by Ennio Morricone from A Fistful of Dollars O.S.T.
- "Results", a track from the soundtrack of the 2014 Indian film Jigarthanda

== Other uses ==
- Result (schooner), a schooner built in Carrickfergus in 1893
- Result, New York, a populated place in Greene County
- Result (cricket), final outcome (win, tie, or draw) in the bat-and-ball game of cricket
- Results (film), a 2015 film starring Guy Pearce and Cobie Smulders
- Results (organisation), a US poverty advocacy organization founded 1980

== See also ==
- Result merchant, see Glossary of contract bridge terms#R
- Results May Vary, an album by Limp Bizkit 2003
- Causality
- Find (disambiguation)
- Negative result (disambiguation)
