= Bjǫrn the Easterner =

9th century Viking

Bjǫrn Ketilsson (Old Norse: [ˈbjɔrn ˈketelsˌson]; Modern Icelandic: Björn Ketilsson [ˈpjœ(r)tn̥ ˈcʰɛːtɪlsˌsɔːn]), nicknamed the Easterner (O.N.: austræni [ˈɔustrɛːne]; M.I.: [ˈœystraiːnɪ]), was a Norwegian Viking of the 9th century.

== Biography ==
He was the son of Ketill 'Flatnose' Bjǫrnsson and Yngvild Ketilsdottir. He was the only son of Flatnose Ketil not to be baptised. The Eyrbyggja saga explains his nickname as follows: Bjorn had been fostered in Sweden, and when the family moved to the Hebrides of Scotland, Bjorn remained behind in the East. When he rejoined his family in the West, he refused to embrace the Christian faith as the others had done by then. He was given the nickname "The Easterner" to emphasize his 'non-western' attitude. He emigrated to Iceland following his father's expulsion from Norway by King Harald Fairhair (Harald hårfagre). Harald confiscated all of Ketil's lands in the north of Norway and outlawed Bjorn the Easterner, the only one of Ketil's five children who had remained in Norway. Thorolf Mostur-Beard hid Bjorn the Easterner from Harald in Norway until both men were able to emigrate. Thorolf went directly to Iceland in about 882 and settled at Helgafell on the Snaefellsnes peninsula, where Hvammsfjord runs into Breidafjord. Bjorn went to the Hebrides first. Bjorn followed his family to the Hebrides ten years after Ingólfr Arnarson had settled in Iceland. This suggests a date c884 for Bjorn's voyage to the west. When he reached the Hebrides, he found that his father, Ketill, had already died. Bjorn then sailed to Iceland two years later, where Thorolf granted him land on Snaefellsnes between Hraunsvík and Hraunsfjord. Eyrbyggja Saga and Laxdaela Saga concern, respectively, Bjorn's descendants. Bjorn returned to Norway and fought for the return of his father's land, but was unsuccessful. He returned to Iceland, became a settler on the peninsula of Snæfellsnes, and lived on a farm at Bjarnarhöfn.

Bjǫrn is a character in such works as Laxdæla saga, Eyrbyggja saga, and Eirik the Red's Saga. His genealogy is described in detail in the Landnámabók.

== See also ==
- Laxdæla saga
- Encyclopedia.com Encyclopedias almanacs transcripts and maps
- The Discovery and Settlement of Iceland.
