= Thorstein the Red =

Viking chieftain

Thorstein the Red or Thorstein Olafsson was a viking chieftain who flourished in late ninth-century Scotland.

== Biography ==
He was born around 845 AD and was the son of Olaf the White, King of Dublin, and Aud the Deep-minded, who was the daughter of Ketil Flatnose. After the death of Olaf, Aud and Thorstein went to live in the Hebrides, then under Ketil's rule. Thorstein eventually became a warlord and allied with the Jarl of Orkney, Sigurd Eysteinsson. Together Thorstein and Sigurd waged a series of campaigns in Caithness, Sutherland, Ross, Moray, and a number of other regions, eventually receiving tribute from half of Scotland. However, the Scottish chieftains plotted against Thorstein, and he was killed; the exact nature of his death is unknown but it probably took place around 880 or 890. After Thorstein's death Aud left Caithness, sojourning for a while in Orkney before settling with other members of her clan in Iceland.

Thorstein married Thurid, the daughter of Eyvind the Easterner. Thorstein and Thurid had a son, Olaf Feilan, and a number of daughters, including Groa, Thorgerd, Olof, Osk, Thorhild, and Vigdis.

A woman named Unn, wife of Thorolf Mostur-beard, claimed to be the daughter of Thorstein, but this claim was viewed by other Icelanders with scepticism.

== Ancestry ==
Olaf Guðrǫðrsson "Geirstad-Alf"
Helgi Olafsson of Dublin
Ingjald "Hviti" Helgasson
Sigurðr "ormr í auga" Ragnarsson
Thora/Tora Sigurdsdotter
Heluna "Blaeja"
Olaf "Hviti" Ingjaldsson
Thorstein "the Red" Olafsson
Grimm/Grim Hjallrsson/Hjallsson/Hjaldursson
Bjorn "Buna" Grimmsson/Grimsson
Hervor Helgasdatter
Ketil/Ketill "Flatnefr" Bjǫrnsson
Viking "Skaanoyskjelmer"
Velaug Vikingsdatter
Auðr "djúpúðga" Ketilsdóttir
Ketil/Ketill "Wether"
Ingveld/Yngvid Ketilsdóttir

== See also ==
- Jaun Zuria supposed founder of the Lords of Biscay and speculatively linked with Thorstein's father Olafr hinn Hviti.
