= Ingjald Helgasson =

Ninth-century Hibero-Norse chieftain

Ingjaldr Helgason was a Hiberno-Norse chieftain of the 9th Century.

According to the Landnámabók Ingjald was the son of Helgi, the son of Olaf, the son of Gudrod, the son of Halfdan Hvitbeinn; he was thus distantly related to the Yngling kings of Vestfold and later Norway. According to Eyrbyggja saga, Ingjald's mother was Thora, a daughter of Sigurd Snake-in-the-Eye, who was a son of Ragnar Lodbrok. However, this connection is dubious, as Ingjald appears to have been born in the early 9th Century – either before or at around the same time as Ragnar.

Ingjald had at least one son, Olaf the White, who became King of Dublin.
