= Finder (surname) =

Finder is a surname. Notable people with the surname include:

- Alexandra Finder (born 1977), German actress
- Jan Howard Finder (1939–2013), American academic administrator and writer
- Joseph Finder (born 1958), American writer
- Paweł Finder (1904–1944), Polish Communist
