= Ketill Flatnose =

9th-century Norse King of the Scottish Isles

Ketill Björnsson, nicknamed Flatnose (Old Norse: Flatnefr), was a Norse King of the Isles of the 9th century.

== Primary sources ==
The story of Ketill and his daughter Auðr, or Aud the Deep-Minded, was probably first recorded by the Icelander Ari Þorgilsson (1067 – 1148). Ari was born not long after the death of his great-grandmother Guðrún Ósvífrsdóttir – a prominent character in the Laxdæla saga whose husband, Thorkell Eyjolfsson, was descended from Auðr. Ari was thus a direct descendant of Ketill and so, when he wrote his story of Ketill, he was drawing in part on oral traditions amongst his own relatives.

Ketill was also depicted in such works as the Laxdæla saga, Eyrbyggja saga and the Saga of Erik the Red, while his genealogy was described in detail in the Landnámabók.

However, like many other medieval histories, all of these Old Norse works were written long after the events they described. No contemporaneous records of Ketill's life are known to exist, with the arguable exception of a single entry in the Annals of Ulster.

== Saga biography ==
Ketill Björnsson was the son of Björn Grímsson. In the Laxdaela saga he is recorded as being from Romsdal (Raumsdal), a valley in the county of Møre og Romsdal, between Nordmøre and Sunnmøre and from Sogn in the Landnámabók.

Most of Ketill's family eventually emigrated to Iceland. Ketill's wife was Yngvild Ketilsdóttir, daughter of Ketill Wether, a hersir from Ringerike. They had a number of children, including Bjǫrn Ketilsson, who lived at Bjarnarhofn; Helgi "Bjolan" Ketilsson, who lived at Esjuberg on Kjalarnes; Thorunn Ketilsdatter, wife of Helgi the Lean, the first settler in Eyjafjordur bay; and Jorunn Ketilsdatter. Ketill's daughter, Aud the Deep-Minded, married Olaf the White, King of Dublin. Their son, Thorstein the Red, briefly conquered much of northern Scotland during the 870s and 880s before he was killed in battle. Aud and many members of her clan settled in the Laxdael region of Iceland.

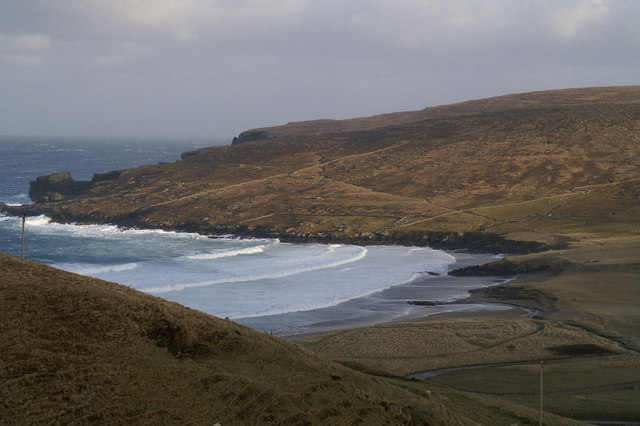
Norwick, Unst, one of the closest landfalls in Shetland to Norway.

There is evidence that Scandinavian settlers may have reached the Norðreyjar (Northern Isles) – the Orkneys and Shetland, north of mainland Scotland – as early as the mid-7th century. After Harald Fairhair won the decisive Battle of Hafrsfjord, in the late 9th century, to take control of Norway, many people emigrated to the Orkneys and Shetlands. According to the Orkneyinga saga, some of these emigres began to raid Norway in summer, and Harald followed them to retaliate; he defeated them and also took possession of what the Norse called the Suðreyjar (or Sudreys): the Hebrides and the Isle of Man. However, in the Eyrbyggja saga, it was Ketill, rather than Harald himself, who led that expedition, and after the initial victory the former retained the islands as an independent, personal domain, rather than bringing them under Harald's rule. In the Laxdaela saga the same story is told, but here Ketill is one of the Vikings who have fled to the Isles to escape Harald's tyranny. In the Landnámabók the initial conquest was led by Harald, but as soon as he returned to Norway the raiders regrouped. At this point Harald sent Ketill to win the islands back again. Ketill did so, but paid no tribute, at which point Harald took possession of what was owed from possessions of Ketill in Norway and sent away Ketill's sons. According to the Landnámabók, Ketill became ruler of a region already settled by Scandinavians. Some sources refer to Ketill as "King of the Sudreys", although there is little evidence that he himself claimed that title. Ketill left no successors there, and there is little record of Norse activity in the west of Scotland in the first four decades of the 10th century.

== Interpretations ==
Hunter (2000) states that Ketill was "in charge of an extensive island realm and, as a result, sufficiently prestigious to contemplate the making of agreements and alliances with other princelings". However, Woolf (2007) suggests that the story of his failing to pay tax to Harald "looks very much like a story created in later days to legitimise Norwegian claims to sovereignty in the region" and some scholars believe that this entire story of Harald's expedition is apocryphal and based on the later voyages of Magnus Barefoot. Although Norse military activity in Ireland in the 9th century is well documented in Irish sources, they contain no record at all of Harald Fairhair's voyage to the west.

Furthermore, Harald is assumed to have annexed the Northern Isles (comprising Orkney and Shetland) in 875 or later. If Ketill's suzerainty post-dates this time, it is hard to see how Thorstein the Red, an adult grandson of his, could have been active in the 870s and 880s. It is therefore likely that Ketill's floruit in the Hebrides was at a period that pre-dates Harald's victory at Hafrsfjord.

=== Caittil Find ===
Ketill Flatnose is also sometimes equated with Caittil Find, a reported leader of the Gallgáedil recorded in the Annals of Ulster as fighting in Ireland in 857. This source states simply that "Ímar and Amlaíb inflicted a rout on Caittil the Fair and his Norse-Irish in the lands of Munster." (Ímar and Amlaíb are well-attested Norse leaders active in Ireland and the Isles in the 9th century.)

The Ketill/Caittil relationship was first proposed by E. W. Robertson in 1862, and then rejected by J. H. Todd in 1867. Robertson's position has since been supported by, among others, W. F. Skene and A. P. Smyth, while others, including A. O. Anderson and Donnchadh Ó Corráin are more skeptical.

In more recent scholarly debate, Clare Downham maintains scepticism on the link and also draws attention to a reference to 'Cetill' in Welsh chronicles in 844. The connection between the Ketill in Irish records and Norse sagas is described by Woolf (2007) as "extremely tenuous", but Jennings and Kruse (2009) have supported the identification.

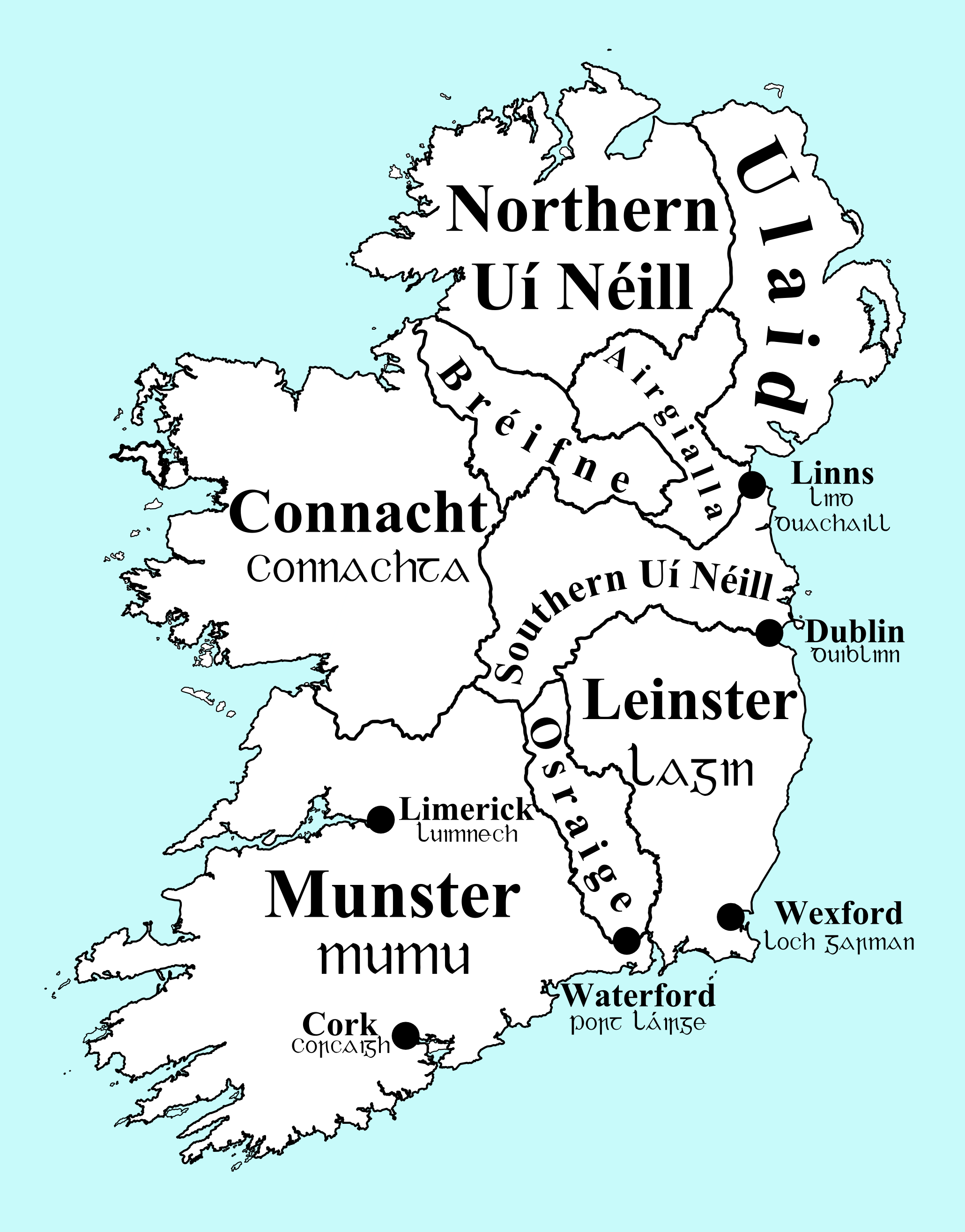
Ireland circa 900. Osraige was a buffer state between Munster in the south west and Leinster to the south east.

Woolf argues that:

- Ketill was a common Norse name during this period, and there is no certainty that "Ketill" and "Caittil" can be equated.
- Find means "white" rather than "flat-nosed".
- There is nothing in the saga sources to indicate either that Ketill was active in Ireland or that there was a connection between the Gallgáedil and the Scottish islands in the Irish sources.
- Ketill is described in the sagas as the father-in-law of Olaf the White, a figure some historians believe to be identical with Amlaíb, yet here Caittil is clearly the enemy of Amlaíb.

Jennings and Kruse recognise the deficiencies of the saga materials but suggest that "they should not be summarily written off as void of any historical value". They note that:

- Ari Þorgilsson was drawing on family history that would have "become muddled and mistaken in parts", but that the story is still likely to contain "other parts that can be close to the historical truth".
- In the same way that the historical Caittil can be the same person as the character Keitill, it is widely accepted that Cerball mac Dúnlainge, King of Osraige, is the same person as the saga character Kjarvalr Írakonungr even though their names are dissimilar.
- The Norse sources have Ketill's daughters Thorunn marrying Helgi inn magri, a grandson of Cerball mac Dúnlainge, and Auðr marrying Olaf the White, both of whom were prominent figures in Ireland, suggesting significant connections between Ketill and the mid-9th century political landscape of that region.
- The Norse traditions provide some members of Kettil's family such as his son Helgi and his great-grandson Áleif with Gaelic nicknames, suggesting a link with Gallgáedil traditions. (Helgi Bjólan and Áleif Feilan, which mean Helgi "little mouth" and Áleif "little wolf".) His daughter Auðr is recorded as a devout Christian, and one of her freedmen, Erpr, has a Pictish name. Ketill's nephew Orlyg Hrappsson is linked to the Celtic church and was a follower of St Columba.
- An individual can have more than one nickname, and dynastic marriages do not always equate to friendship.

=== Dál Riata ===
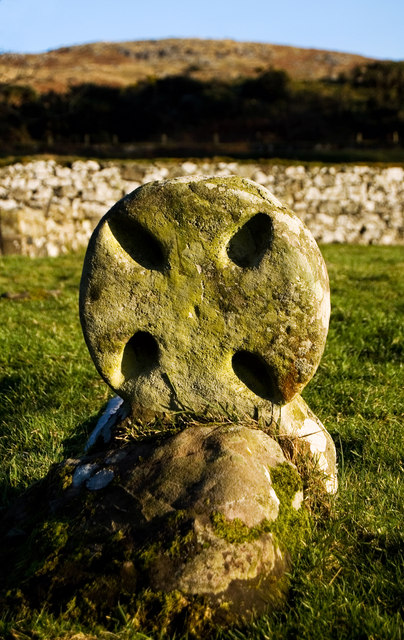
Viking-age headstone, St Blane's Chapel, near Kingarth

Dál Riata was a Gaelic kingdom in the Argyll and Bute region of Scotland. Jennings and Kruse argue that Ketill Bjornsson could have taken "control of Dál Riata with its islands". They note the correspondence between the Gaelic name Dál Riata and the fact that when Auðr, settled in the Breiðafjörður region of western Iceland it was in a region called Dalir or Dalaland (modern Dalasýsla). Furthermore, "in the Breiðafjörður area there is an indisputably nostalgic Celtic precedent for quite a few names." Examples include islands called Pjattland (Pictland) and Írland (Ireland) and the nearby Patreksfjörður and Trostansfjörður named in honour of two Celtic saints.

They also quote the Irish Martyrology of Tallaght, which refers to a "[Feast of] Bláán, bishop of Kingarth in Gall-Ghàidheil". This indicates that St Blane of Kingarth in Bute was closely connected to the Gallgáedil. The text is dated not later than the early tenth century and it seems that this part of Dál Riata was by then part of Gallgáedil-held territory. Fraser (2009) has suggested that Little Dunagoil near Kingarth could have been the Dalriadan Cenél Comgaill capital prior to the Norse incursions.

=== Catol ===
The Chronicum Scotorum refers to a battle that took place in 904 in which two grandsons of Ímar and their ally "Catol" were victorious against "Aed" who was evidently a leader in either Ireland or Pictland. It has been suggested that Catol was Ketill Flatnose (although once again the chronology is problematic), or alternatively that he was Cadell ap Rhodri, a King of Gwynedd.

== Portrayal ==
Ketill Flatnose is portrayed by Adam Copeland (better known in WWE by the ring name Edge) in the 5th and 6th season of the historical drama television series Vikings.

== Notes ==
Regnal titles
Preceded by unknown	King of the Isles	Succeeded by unknown
