= Aud the Deep-Minded (Ketilsdóttir) =

9th-century Icelandic settler

- Born: c. 834; Norway
- Died: c. 900; Iceland
- Other names: Aud Ketilsdatter
- Occupations: Queen consort of Dublin; Ringkvinna
- Spouse: Olaf the White
- Children: Thorstein the Red
- Parents: Ketill Flatnose (father); Yngvid Ketilsdóttir (mother)
- Family: Flatnefr-ætt; Laxdælir

Aud the Deep-Minded (Old Norse: Auðr djúpúðga Ketilsdóttir [ˈɔuðz̠ ˈdjuːpˌuːðɣɑ ˈketelsˌdoːtːez̠]; Modern Icelandic: Auður djúpúðga Ketilsdóttir [ˈœyːðʏr ˈtjuːpˌuðɣa ˈcʰɛːtɪlsˌtouhtɪr̥]; Norwegian: Aud den djuptenkte), also known as Unn, Aud Ketilsdatter or Unnur Ketilsdottir, was a 9th-century settler during the age of Settlement of Iceland. The main source of information about her life in Iceland is Sturla Þórðarson's Landnámabók; Laxdæla saga, which calls her Unn, gives a varying account but has more on her background, and she also figures in several other sagas, including Njáls saga, Eyrbyggja saga, Eiríks saga rauða and Grettis saga.

== Biography ==
Aud the Deep-Minded was the second daughter of Ketill Flatnose, a Norwegian hersir, and Yngvid Ketilsdóttir, daughter of Ketill Wether, a hersir from Ringerike. She married Olaf the White (Oleif), son of King Ingjald, who had named himself King of Dublin after going on voyages to Britain and then conquering the shire of Dublin. They had a son named Thorstein the Red. After Oleif was killed in battle in Ireland, Aud the Deep-Minded and Thorstein journeyed to the Hebrides. Thorstein married there and had six daughters and one son. He also became a great warrior king, conquering in northern Scotland; however, he was killed in battle after being betrayed by his people.

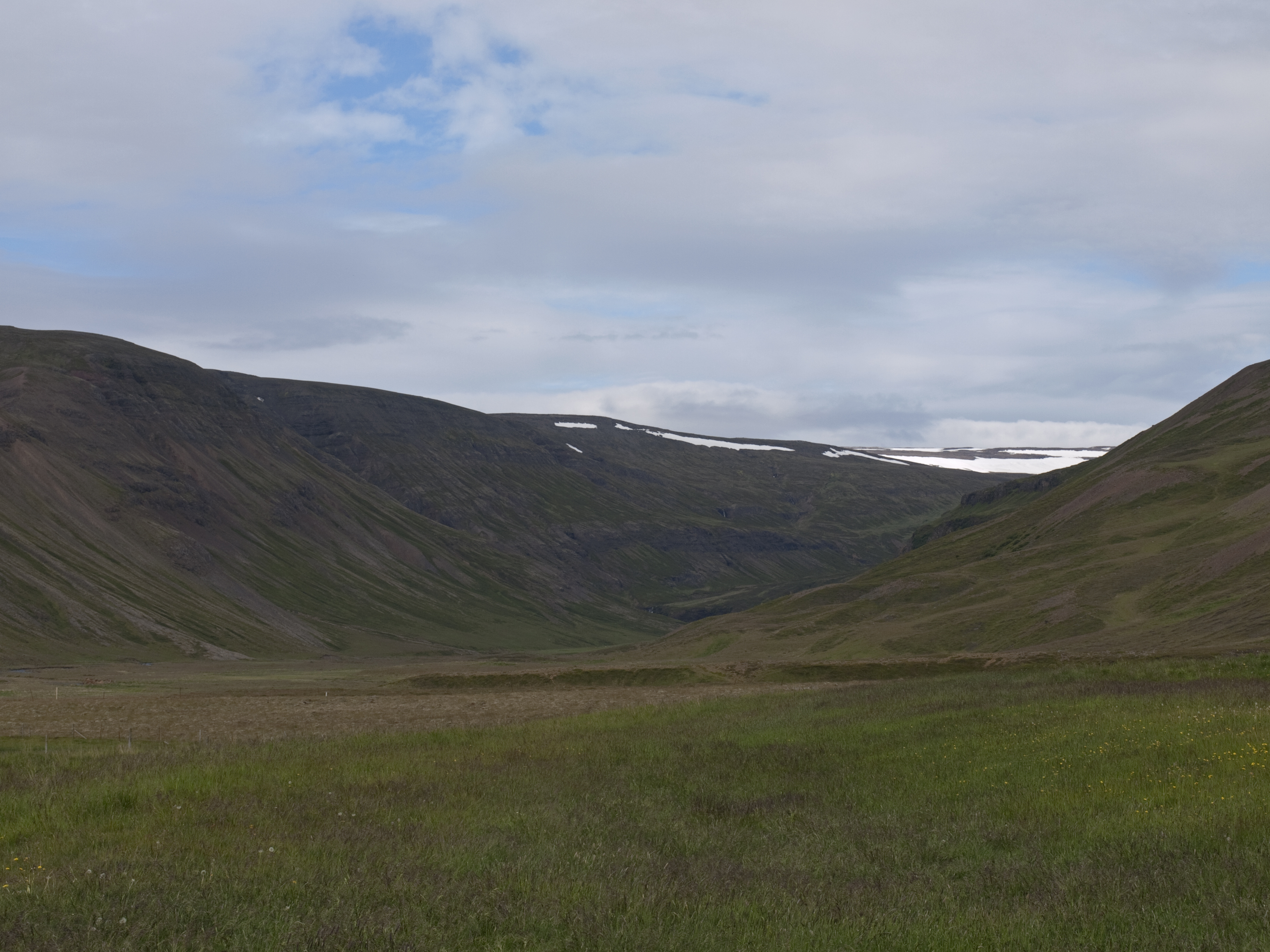
Hvammur í Dölum

Upon learning of the death of Thorstein, Aud the Deep-Minded, who was then at Caithness, commissioned the construction of a knarr, a type of ship used in the Viking Age for Atlantic voyages. For unknown reasons, she had it built secretly in the forest. With several surviving kin aboard, she captained the ship to Orkney, where she married off one of her granddaughters, Gróa, then to the Faroes, where she married off another granddaughter, Ólöf, and she then finally to the area of Breiðafjörður in Iceland, where her brother Björn lived. She brought her grandson, Olaf Feilan, with her to Iceland. The ship had a crew of twenty men under her command and also carried thralls, men who had been taken prisoner in Viking raids near and around the British Isles. When Aud the Deep-Minded arrived in the western region of Iceland, she claimed all the land in Dalasýsla between the rivers Dögurðará and Skraumuhlaupsá for her family, and gave the thralls their freedom (making them freedmen, with a status between slave and free). She gave both the crewmen and the freedmen land to farm and make a living. One of the freedmen, Vifil, was given Vifilsdal, part of Hvammur í Dölum, the area in which Aud the Deep-Minded settled.

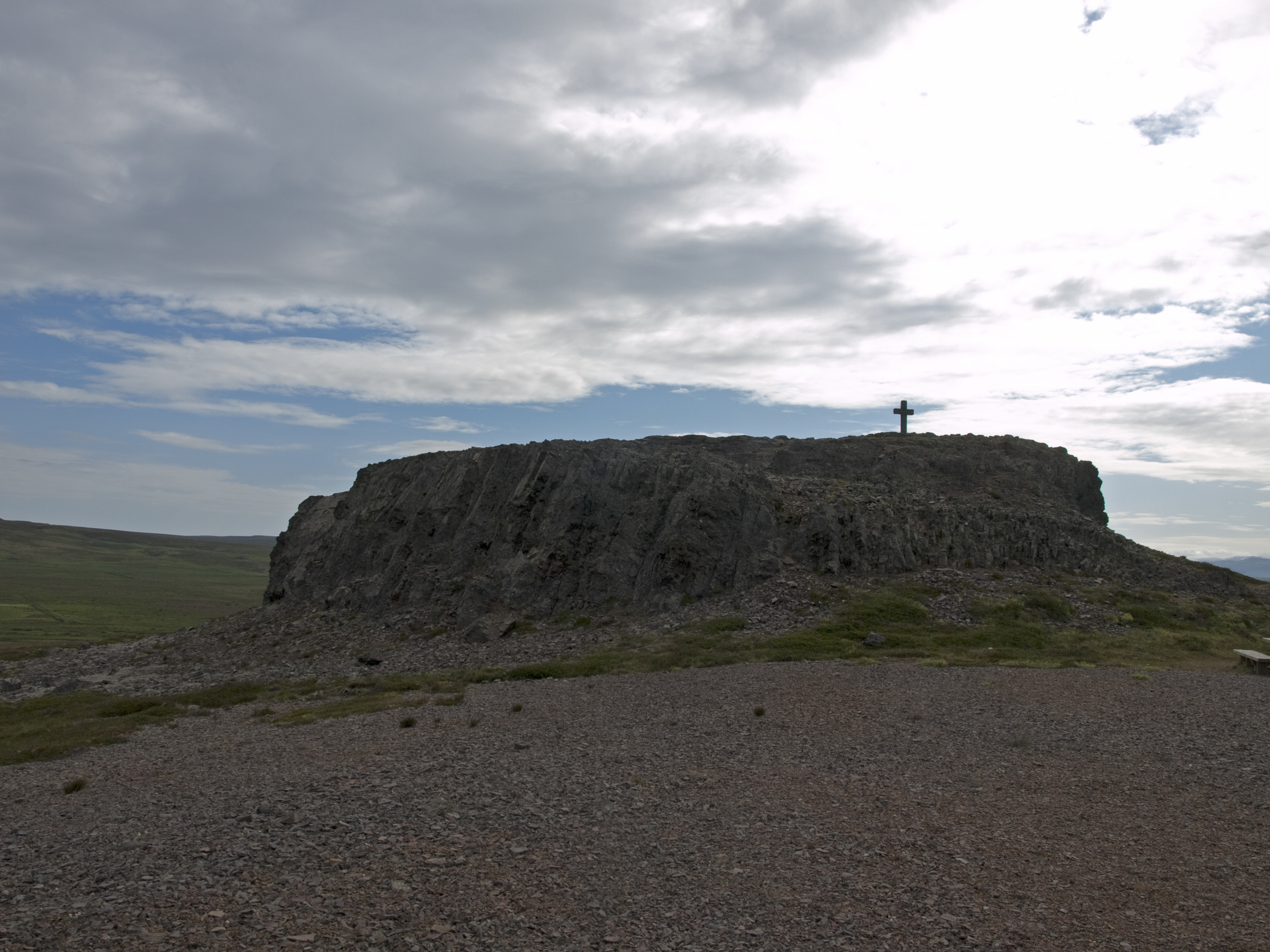
Cross in memory of Aud the Deep-Minded at Krosshólar

Unlike most early Icelandic settlers, Aud the Deep-Minded was a baptized Christian. She erected crosses in a hilly area where she often went to pray, which became known as Krosshólar ('cross hills'). According to Landnámabók, which calls her Aud the Deeply Wealthy (Auðr in djúpauðga), she died on the third night of a feast which she hosted as a farewell and which she asked those present to continue for three more nights as her wake, and she was buried in the tidal zone because there was no consecrated cemetery in which to bury her. Laxdæla saga, however, calls her Unn the Deep-Minded (Unnr in djúpúðga) and depicts her as a heathen woman renowned for her wisdom; according to its account, she died during the wedding feast for her grandson and was given a ship burial.

Aud the Deep-Minded had unusual power and authority for a woman, and successfully saved herself, her grandchildren and considerable wealth from a catastrophic situation, although examination of various accounts of warrior rulers named Olaf suggests that Olaf the White may not have been killed in Ireland, but returned to Norway in 871 to regain control of his father's kingdom. Her story also demonstrates that Iceland was not settled only by Norwegians of noble birth, but also by people from Scotland and the northern isles, including Vikings. The National Museum of Iceland contains a collection of somewhat debased penannular brooches and pins of undoubted Celtic provenance from the ninth and tenth centuries which would fit well in the context of the Hebridean Norse–Gael.

== Legacy ==
Many prominent Icelanders of the Middle Ages were descended from Aud through her grandson and several granddaughters, in particular the Sturlungs, whose family estate was at her former residence of Hvammur. In the 18th and 19th centuries, she became known as a national foremother; in the 18th century she was praised in works based on Laxdæla saga such as Tyrfingur Finnsson's poem "Laxdælakappakvæði", and in 1828, Jón Jónsson langur recorded a prayer ascribed to her. On August 8, 1965, a cross was erected at Krosshólaborg as a monument to her, inscribed with a passage from Landnámabók.

Aud is the main character in a trilogy of novels by Icelandic author Vilborg Davíðsdóttir: Auður (2009), Vígroði (2010), and Blóðug jörð (2017). A loosely-based Aud, also daughter of Ketill Flatnose and involved with the settlement of Iceland, is portrayed by Leah McNamara in the 5th season of the historical drama television series Vikings (2013). A chamber opera 'Aud the Deep Minded' by Joanna Nicholson (2024) addresses Aud's earlier life up to settling in Iceland and freeing her thralls.
