= Olaf the White =

Viking sea-king

Olaf the White (Old Norse: Óláfr hinn Hvíti) was a viking sea-king who lived in the latter half of the 9th century.

== Life ==
Olaf was born around 820, in Ireland. His father was the Hiberno-Norse warlord Ingjald Helgasson. Some traditional sources portray Olaf as a descendant of Ragnar Lodbrok – for instance, the Eyrbyggja Saga, claims that Olaf's paternal grandmother (Thora) was a daughter of Ragnar's son Sigurd Snake-in-the-Eye. However, this connection seems unlikely, given that Sigurd appears to have lived in the mid-9th Century and Ragnar himself may have lived until the 860s. Irish fragments provide a different genealogy, suggesting that Olaf's father was Godfred, son of Ragnall, son of Godfred, son of Godfred.

He was named King of Dublin around 853. According to Irish sources, Olaf ruled jointly with his kinsman Ímar. Olaf married Aud the Deep-minded (Auðr), daughter of Ketil Flatnose, the ruler of the Hebrides, according to Icelandic traditions (Landnámabók, Laxdæla saga). The Irish sources name Olaf's wife only as the daughter of a "King Aedh".

Olaf and Auðr had a son, Thorstein the Red (Þorsteinn rauðr), who attempted to conquer Scotland in the 870s. At some point Olaf had a falling-out with the clan of Ketil and sent Auðr and their son back to her father's house. According to Landnámabók, Olaf and Þorsteinn Rauðr were both killed in the British Isles.

Thorstein the Red was married to Þuriðr Eyvindardóttir Austmann, and they had several children: Gróa, Álof, Þorgerðr, Þórhildr, Vigdís, Ósk, Ólafr feilan, ancestor of Ari Fróði, author of Landnámabók. The family was related to the Vinland explorers and the Sturlung family.

== Identification and historical conjecture ==
Olaf may be identical with the Viking warlord Amlaíb Conung, who according to Irish sources was killed in 871/2 by Causantín mac Cináeda, king of Alba. However, both Gwyn Jones and Peter Hunter Blair dispute this identification.

Old Norse sources mention two Olafs belonging to the ninth-century house of Vestfold. The first of these, Olaf the White, because of his connections with Dublin and with Ketil Flatnose, must be identified with Olaf king of Dublin, as described in early Irish and Scottish chronicles. We are also told in the Heimskringla of Olaf Guthfrithsson of Vestfold who on good archaeological evidence can be identified with the king buried in the Gokstad ship. It is possible that there was only one such king, Olaf Guthfrisson of Vestfold, who in his earlier days ruled from Dublin and raided in Scotland and who later in 871 returned to claim his Vestfold kingdom. The Irish Three Fragments of Annals, while not actually proving such a theory, do support the case for regarding Olaf Guthfrithsson of Vestfold as being the same as Olaf the White of Dublin and the Scottish Isles. The Fragments claim that Olaf of Dublin ended his reign there when c. 871 he returned to Norway to support his father Guthfrith in a struggle for a kingdom. This passage, then, would identify Olaf of Dublin, alias Olaf the White of Landnamabok with Olaf Guthfrithsson of Norway.
