= Vikings season 4 =

Season of television series

Vikings
- Season 4
- DVD cover arts for part 1 (top) and part 2 (bottom)
- Starring: Travis Fimmel; Katheryn Winnick; Clive Standen; Gustaf Skarsgård; Alexander Ludwig; Alyssa Sutherland; Ben Robson; Lothaire Bluteau; John Kavanagh; Linus Roache; Peter Franzén; Jasper Pääkkönen; Kevin Durand; Alex Høgh; Marco Ilsø; David Lindström; Jordan Patrick Smith; Moe Dunford; Jonathan Rhys Meyers
- No. of episodes: 20

Release
- Original network: History
- Original release: February 18 – April 21, 2016
- Original release: November 30, 2016 – February 1, 2017

Season chronology
- ← Previous; Season 3 Next → Season 5

The fourth season of the historical drama television series Vikings premiered on February 18, 2016, on History in Canada. The series broadly follows the exploits of the legendary Viking chieftain Ragnar Lothbrok and his crew, and later those of his sons. The first season of the series begins at the start of the Viking Age, marked by the Lindisfarne raid in 793.

The fourth season consists of a double-season order of twenty episodes, split into two parts of ten episodes; The first half concluded on April 21, 2016. The second half premiered on November 30, 2016. The season follows the battles between Ragnar and Rollo in Francia, Bjorn's raid into the Mediterranean Sea, and the Viking invasion of England. It concluded in its entirety on February 1, 2017.

== Cast ==
=== Main ===
- Travis Fimmel as King Ragnar Lothbrok, the head of the Earldom of Kattegat who was crowned king after Horik's death
- Katheryn Winnick as Queen Lagertha, a shield-maiden and Ragnar's ex-wife; she controls the Earldom of Hedeby calling herself Earl Ingstad. Later, she becomes queen of Kattegat.
- Clive Standen as Duke Rollo, a warrior and Ragnar's brother; he was granted the title of Duke of Normandy by Emperor Charles.
- Gustaf Skarsgård as Floki, a gifted shipbuilder and a friend of Ragnar's. He is on trial for the murder of Athelstan
- Alexander Ludwig as Bjorn Ironside, Ragnar and Lagertha's son, who has a relationship with Torvi
  - Nathan O'Toole portrays a young Bjorn Ironside, appearing in Ragnar's visions.
- Alyssa Sutherland as Queen Aslaug, Brynhildr's daughter and Ragnar's second wife
- Ben Robson as Earl Kalf, a Viking warrior who shares the control of Hedeby with Lagertha (part 1)
- Lothaire Bluteau as Emperor Charles of West Francia (part 1)
- John Kavanagh as The Seer, the seiðrmann of Kattegat
- Linus Roache as King Ecbert of Wessex, the ruthless king of Wessex
- Peter Franzén as King Harald Finehair, a Viking ambitious to become the first King of Norway
- Jasper Pääkkönen as Halfdan the Black, Harald's violent younger brother
- Kevin Durand as Harbard, a charismatic wanderer and storyteller (part 1)
- Alex Høgh as Ivar the Boneless, the fourth son of Ragnar and Aslaug (part 2, guest part 1)
  - James Quinn Markey portrays a young Ivar the Boneless
- Marco Ilsø as Hvitserk, second son of Ragnar and Aslaug (part 2, guest part 1)
  - Stephen Rockett portrays a young Hvitserk
- David Lindström as Sigurd Snake-in-the-Eye, third son of Ragnar and Aslaug (part 2, guest part 1)
  - Elijah O'Sullivan portrays a young Sigurd Snake-in-the-Eye
- Jordan Patrick Smith as Ubbe, eldest son of Ragnar and Aslaug (part 2, guest part 1)
  - Luke Shanahan portrays a young Ubbe
- Moe Dunford as Prince Aethelwulf, son of King Ecbert (part 2, recurring part 1)
- Jonathan Rhys Meyers as Bishop Heahmund, a very religious warrior priest (part 2) (Note: Jonathan Rhys Meyers only appears in one episode of the season, although credited as a main cast member.)

=== Recurring ===
- George Blagden as Athelstan, a deceased Anglo-Saxon monk and friend of Ragnar's. He was killed by Floki towards the end of the previous season and appears in Ragnar and Ecbert's visions.
- Dianne Doan as Yidu, Queen Aslaug's new slave
- Maude Hirst as Helga, Floki's long-suffering lover and wife
- Owen Roe as Count Odo of Paris
- Edvin Endre as Erlendur, son of King Horik and second husband of Torvi
- Georgia Hirst as Torvi, wife of Erlendur and, later, wife of Bjorn
- Morgane Polanski as Princess Gisla of West Francia, daughter of Emperor Charles, wedded to Duke Rollo
- Rosalie Connerty as Angrboda, daughter of Floki and Helga
- Huw Parmenter as Roland, Count Odo's first-in-command and Therese's brother
- Karen Hassan as Therese, Roland's sister and Count Odo's mistress
- Amy Bailey as Queen Kwenthrith of Mercia
- Jennie Jacques as Princess Judith of Northumbria, daughter of King Aelle, wedded to Aethelwulf
- Seán T. Ó Meallaigh as Prudentius of Troyes, a monk serving at the court of King Ecbert
- Des Carney as Waerferth the Scout, serving King Ecbert
- Conor Ó Hanlon as infant Alfred, Princess Judith and Athelstan's son
- Philip O'Sullivan as Bishop Edmund, serving at the court of King Ecbert
- Niall Cusack as Abbot Lupus, serving at the court of Emperor Charles
- Ivan Kaye as King Aelle of Northumbria
- Ruby O'Leary as Gyda, Ragnar and Lagertha's daughter. She appears in Ragnar's visions.
- Josefin Asplund as Astrid, Lagertha's lover and advisor
- Ida Marie Nielsen as Margrethe, one of Queen Aslaug's slaves
- Anton Giltrap as Guthrum, Jarl Borg and Torvi's son
- Charles Last as William, first son of Rollo and Gisla
- Isaac O'Sullivan as child Alfred, Princess Judith and Athelstan's son
- André Eriksen as Odin, appearing in visions
- Sinead Gormally as Tanaruz, a Moorish child
- Charlie Kelly as Egil, an agent of King Harald
- Cathy White as Queen Ealhswith of Northumbria, King Aelle's wife
- Caitlin Scott as Princess Blaeja, daughter of King Aelle
- Jack Nolan as Earl Jorgensen, a Swedish warlord
- Sophie Vavasseur as Princess Ellisif, the object of King Harald's affections
- Gary Buckley as Earl Vik, Princess Ellisif's husband
- Gary Murphy as Bishop Unwan, serving at the court of King Aelle

=== Guest ===
- Søren Pilmark as Stender, a farmer whose family was killed in Wessex. He was killed by Ragnar and appears in his dreams.
- Steve Wall as Einar, a scheming troublemaker. He is killed by Lagertha.
- Frankie McCafferty as Sinric, a polyglot drifter
- Cillian O'Sullivan as Eirik, a Viking warrior in Paris, former second in command of Rollo. He is betrayed by him and killed by Franks.
- Robban Follin as Berserker, an assassin recruited by Erlendur and Kalf to kill Bjorn. He is killed by Bjorn himself.
- Declan Conlon as Lord Wigstan, Queen Kwenthrith's second cousin and the head of the Royal Family of Mercia
- John Kavanagh as Pope Leo IV
- Adam McNamara as Thorhall, a Danish Viking who delivers bad news to Queen Aslaug and Bjorn
- Liam Clarke as Gudmund, a settler in Ragnar and Ivar's party
- Ed Murphy as Gardar, a settler in Ragnar and Ivar's party
- Jack Walsh as John Scotus Eriugena, a theologian
- Cameron Hogan as Magnus, Queen Kwenthrith and King Ragnar's supposed son
- Josh Donaldson as Hoskuld, a Viking warrior of great skill
- Tamaryn Payne as Widow Ordlaf, a lady of Sherborne

== Episodes ==
No. overall	No. in season	Title	Directed by	Written by	Original release date
Part 1
30	1	"A Good Treason"	Ciarán Donnelly	Michael Hirst	February 18, 2016
Ragnar, wounded and near death, has a dream of walking towards the open gates of Valhalla, only to see them close before him. Aslaug asks the Seer if a woman would rule Kattegat, should Ragnar die. Bjorn has Floki arrested for killing Athelstan. When Ragnar awakens, he chastises Bjorn for imprisoning his friend. Bjorn wants to prove himself by surviving deep in the wilderness. Aslaug procures a new slave girl, Yidu. In Hedeby, Earl Kalf announces that he and Lagertha will share the Earldom, to the dislike of Einar. Kalf invites Einar and his men to vote to exile Lagertha, then turns on them, killing the dissidents and allowing Lagertha to emasculate Einar before he dies. In Paris, Rollo is living as a Frankish noble. He marries Princess Gisla, who weeps through the ceremony and holds a knife to his throat on their wedding night. Rollo rides to the Viking encampment outside Paris and orders their massacre.
31	2	"Kill the Queen"	Ciarán Donnelly	Michael Hirst	February 25, 2016
Bjorn has set off alone into the harsh Scandinavian winter. Helga frees Floki from his bonds. Ragnar confronts Helga, who admits what she has done, and he tells her that he understands. Ubbe accompanies the manhunt for Floki and discovers him hiding in a stream. After he is captured, Ragnar chains Floki inside a damp cave. Ragnar finds Helga digging a grave in the frozen ground for her daughter. In Wessex, King Ecbert proposes to rescue Princess Kwenthrith of Mercia and her child, who is being held by rebel nobles. Aethelwulf engages in battle and rescues Kwenthrith. Aethelwulf does not know that his wife Judith is sleeping with his father. In Francia, Duke Rollo tries to assimilate by cutting his hair and dressing appropriately but continues to be mocked by his new wife. He proposes building forts to stop the Vikings from sailing upriver.
32	3	"Mercy"	Ciarán Donnelly	Michael Hirst	March 3, 2016
Ragnar and King Ecbert experience separate visions of Athelstan, who relays the words "mercy". Rollo starts to learn the language of Francia. Kalf hires a berserker to assassinate Bjorn, on behalf of Erlendur. Bjorn kills a bear that escaped his trap. Floki and Helga struggle with the death of their daughter. Ragnar approaches the cave and frees Floki. Lagertha sleeps with Kalf and he tells her he loves her. Aethelwulf returns with the rescued Queen Kwenthrith and her son Magnus. Judith's obsession with Athelstan continues. Wessex continues preparing its soldiers. In Francia, Count Odo prepares to defend Paris.
33	4	"Yol"	Helen Shaver	Michael Hirst	March 10, 2016
Floki visits the Seer who tells him that he has waited hundreds of years for Floki's arrival and licks Floki's hand instead of the other way around. Aslaug asks him to teach Ivar the way of the gods. Ragnar grows closer to Yidu and lets her live in his private lodge. She gives Ragnar "medicine" from her native China, which leads to a night of hallucination. In the wilderness, Bjorn meets the berserker and kills him. He discovers that the berserker has King Horik's ring. Bjorn arrives back in Hedeby and wants to leave with Erlendur's wife, Torvi. Rollo is served divorce papers but has by now learned the language, which impresses Gisla. He gives her his armring to show allegiance to her. In Wessex, King Aelle confronts Judith over her affair with King Ecbert. Meanwhile, during the Yol celebrations in Kattegat, King Harald Finehair arrives and declares that he wants to become King of all Norway. Ragnar then arrives to see Harald sitting in his hall.
34	5	"Promised"	Helen Shaver	Michael Hirst	March 17, 2016
Ragnar and Bjorn discuss whether they trust King Harald. Ragnar is addicted to Yidu's "medicine", and they discuss their secrets. Yidu says that her father is a Chinese Emperor, while Ragnar confesses the loss of his English settlement. King Harald's brother Halfdan arrives in Kattegat and lets Ragnar know he is eager to kill Christians. Meanwhile, Torvi reveals to Bjorn that the ring he is carrying, which he took from the berserker, was Erlendur's. In Wessex, Aethelwulf and Judith argue, and Judith tells him they are married in name only. Aethelwulf agrees with Queen Kwenthrith that they need to fight to restore her power in Mercia. In Paris, Therese and Roland reveal to Charles that Odo plans to overthrow him. In Hedeby, Lagertha reveals to Kalf she is pregnant, and Kalf asks her to marry him. Just before their wedding, Lagertha stabs and kills Kalf, and reclaims her status as Earl.
35	6	"What Might Have Been"	Ken Girotti	Michael Hirst	March 24, 2016
Ragnar announces his plan to raid Paris, and gives Ubbe and Hvitserk their arm-rings, so they can travel with him. Before they leave, Ragnar asks the Seer how he will die; he replies that Ragnar will die when "the blind man sees him". In Wessex, Ecbert sends Aethelwulf and Alfred on a pilgrimage to Rome. In Paris, Charles begs Rollo to not return to Ragnar, and Rollo assures him that he will not. Odo reveals to Therese that he will have Charles killed and overthrown. Meanwhile in Kattegat, after the warriors set sail, Harbard returns. A storm throws the Vikings' ships off course. Ragnar, Lagertha, and Harald arrive in France, where they set up camp. Harald and Halfdan take their French prisoners and burn them alive, cheered on by Erlendur. Once the remaining ships arrive, the Vikings sail up the river towards Paris. Ragnar takes more "medicine" and hallucinates. As the ships approach Paris, they see Rollo waiting with his new French allies.
36	7	"The Profit and the Loss"	Ken Girotti	Michael Hirst	March 31, 2016
Ragnar suggests attacking from both the river and by land. Rollo notices Lagertha's warriors become stuck in the marsh, and fires upon them and the ships. As the ships approach the forts, Rollo orders the Franks to raise a metal chain between them, which capsizes some ships. Lagertha's attack retreats, and the Franks begin to set the Viking ships on fire. Bjorn rescues Harald and Halfdan, and Ragnar saves Floki. As the Vikings retreat, Ragnar shouts to Rollo that he saved his life when everyone wanted him dead. Meanwhile, in Kattegat, Sigurd watches as Harbard and Aslaug kiss. In Wessex, Ecbert leaves for Mercia; he arrives to meet with Prince Wigstan, who tells him that the Mercians will not accept Kwenthrith as Queen. He tells Ecbert that he will hand Mercia over to him. In Paris, the Vikings return to their camp, which Roland has ambushed; Helga is alive but wounded, while Ragnar's sons and Yidu are hiding unharmed. Ragnar demands more "medicine" from Yidu. Floki has a vision of Harbard having sex with Aslaug. Bjorn demands a new plan from Ragnar. Ragnar replies that they will retreat tomorrow while muttering to a severed head.
37	8	"Portage"	Ken Girotti	Michael Hirst	April 7, 2016
The Vikings retreat and Ragnar's leadership is questioned by Harald. Ragnar tells Bjorn to land near a cliff, and reveals a new plan: they will take the ships overland, behind the Frankish forts. In Paris, Odo tells Charles they should not trust Rollo, and Roland agrees. Gisla reveals that she carries Rollo's child. Odo meets Therese, but she and Roland betray and execute him. Rollo is awarded the Iron Hand of Frankia. In Wessex, Ecbert returns after victory over Mercia but tells Kwenthrith she is no longer Queen. Meanwhile, in Kattegat, Aslaug sees Harbard with other women and is jealous. She confronts him, and he leaves. In France, Ragnar asks Yidu for more drugs, but she denies him. They argue and she threatens him with revealing his Wessex secret. Ragnar drowns her in a fit of rage. In Wessex, Kwenthrith sneaks into Ecbert's bed and threatens to kill him, but is then killed by Judith.
38	9	"Death All 'Round"	Jeff Woolnough	Michael Hirst	April 14, 2016
As the Vikings carry their ships overland, Harald and Halfdan kill a Frankish family. Lagertha has a miscarriage and is comforted by Ragnar. Aethelwulf and Alfred arrive in Rome, and the Pope makes Alfred a consul. In Wessex, Ecbert is crowned King of both Wessex and Mercia. King Aelle is displeased when Ecbert tells him they are no longer equals. In Kattegat, Sigurd discovers Siggy dead; he tells a drunken Aslaug, who shrugs off her death, and jokes with Ivar. In Paris, Charles appoints Roland its protector. The Vikings arrive outside Paris. Erlendur tells Torvi she must kill Bjorn, or he will kill her son; she approaches Bjorn with Erlendur's crossbow, but instead turns and kills Erlendur. Bjorn tells Ragnar that Paris cannot be taken without him. Ragnar replies he does not care about Paris, and that he is here for Rollo. As the Vikings sail for Paris, Ragnar mutters that he must kill Rollo.
39	10	"The Last Ship"	Jeff Woolnough	Michael Hirst	April 21, 2016
A fleet of Frankish ships led by Rollo approaches the Vikings, and Gisla prays for him. The Vikings and Franks battle, and the Vikings defeat the first French wave. Rollo leads his remaining ships into battle. Meanwhile in Paris, Charles has Roland and Therese executed. Gisla continues praying. Back in the battle, Ragnar and Rollo begin to fight. Halfdan, Floki, and Lagertha are wounded. The Franks gain the upper hand, and Ragnar tells Bjorn to take Lagertha and retreat. Ragnar charges Rollo but is grabbed and thrown back into a ship, as they retreat. Rollo is greeted by Charles and Gisla, and acclaimed by Paris. Ten years later, Ragnar has disappeared from Kattegat. Aslaug is now the sole ruler with Bjorn by her side. Thorhall delivers the news to Aslaug and Bjorn that Ragnar supposedly has a son named Magnus in Wessex. He also tells them the Norse settlement in England had been slaughtered. Bjorn and his brothers discuss their father. He plans to sail into the Mediterranean, and Floki and Helga agree to come on the journey. Ragnar unexpectedly returns to Kattegat. At first he challenges his sons to kill him if they want to become the King. When they do not take the challenge, he offers it to the villagers.
Part 2
40	11	"The Outsider"	Daniel Grou	Michael Hirst	November 30, 2016
Ubbe steps forward to challenge Ragnar, but instead they embrace. Ragnar asks his sons to come with him to England, but Bjorn refuses, as he plans to raid the Mediterranean with Floki, Harald, and Hvitserk. Ubbe and Sigurd promise to stay and protect their mother and Kattegat, now an important trade center. Ivar sees his brothers sharing the slave girl Margrethe, and wants her as well. After failing to sleep with her, he threatens to kill her but instead cries as she tells him that being Ragnar's son is more difficult than being a common man. Ragnar visits Floki and tells him that he loves him. In Hedeby, Ragnar apologizes to Lagertha after she refuses to accompany him to England. Ragnar finds a large tree while riding back to Kattegat and tries to hang himself. However, ravens chew through the rope to save him. Back in Kattegat, Ragnar finds Ivar in the throne room and persuades Ivar to come with him to England.
41	12	"The Vision"	Daniel Grou	Michael Hirst	December 7, 2016
Ragnar asks warriors to accompany him to England; however they refuse and say the gods have deserted him. Ragnar talks to Bjorn about his plan to sail past France, and Bjorn says he will seek diplomacy with Rollo. Sigurd chides Ivar that their mother and brothers pity him. Harald and Halfdan arrive to sail with Bjorn. Bjorn notes Harald's conquest of Rogaland, but Harald assures him that he cannot overthrow Ragnar. Lagertha arrives and agrees with Aslaug to perform a sacrifice to the gods for their sons. She later tells Aslaug she cannot forgive her for taking Ragnar. Ragnar digs up old treasure, and bribes some older warriors to sail with him to England. Ragnar meets Aslaug and thanks her for letting their sons love him. Aslaug has a vision of Ivar drowning and warns him he will die if he goes to England; however, Ivar goes anyway. Bjorn, Hvisterk, Floki, and Harald set sail for the Mediterranean. Ragnar and Ivar sail for England, but their ships capsize in a violent storm.
42	13	"Two Journeys"	Sarah Harding	Michael Hirst	December 14, 2016
Ragnar, Ivar, and a few other survivors are washed up on the beach in England. Some blame Ragnar for their misfortune. Aethelwulf finds Ragnar's black raven banner on the beach and alerts King Ecbert, who reassures him that Ragnar is simply one man. In Francia, Bjorn's fleet arrives and he asks Rollo for safe passage but is imprisoned along with Floki, Harald, and Halfdan. Harald and Halfdan chastise Bjorn for having trusted Rollo. Later, Rollo meets Bjorn and agrees to allow them free passage, if he can sail with them. In Hedeby, Lagertha imprisons Ubbe and Sigurd, and attacks Kattegat, intending to replace Aslaug on the throne. Bjorn's ships set sail, but they stop and submerge Rollo by keelhauling him. Bjorn lets Rollo up, and Rollo laughs as they sail on. In Wessex, Ragnar tells Ivar they must go to the Royal Villa and abandon the others; they kill their fellow Vikings while they are asleep. Ragnar and Ivar arrive at the Royal town and give themselves up.
43	14	"In the Uncertain Hour Before the Morning"	Sarah Harding	Michael Hirst	December 21, 2016
In Kattegat, Aslaug renounces herself as Queen, promising Lagertha that her sons will not seek revenge. In exchange, she wants safe passage to leave. Lagertha initially agrees, but then kills Aslaug. Ubbe and Sigurd arrive to find Lagertha in the great hall. Ubbe challenges Lagertha's warriors in an attempt to kill her but fails. Astrid tells Ubbe and Sigurd that they will die if they harm Lagertha. In Wessex, Ragnar and Ivar are seized by Aethelwulf. Ecbert arrives and promises no harm will come to Ivar, then introduces Ragnar to Magnus. Ragnar states he and Kwenthrith never had sex and Magnus is expelled. Ecbert admits to ordering Aethelwulf to kill the Norse settlers, expresses regret, and frees Ragnar from his cage. The two drunkenly discuss the afterlife and the death of Athelstan, which Ragnar says weighs on his conscience. Ragnar asks Ecbert to kill him, but Ecbert refuses. Instead, Ecbert agrees to hand Ragnar over to King Aelle and arrange a safe passage for Ivar to go home. Ragnar promises that his sons will seek vengeance against Northumbria, not Wessex.
44	15	"All His Angels"	Ciarán Donnelly	Michael Hirst	December 28, 2016
Ecbert has arranged a ship to take Ivar home. Ragnar speaks with Ivar alone and says goodbye, knowing he will be handed over to Aelle and die. Ragnar tells Ivar to take revenge on Ecbert and to be ruthless. Ragnar gives Athelstan's cross to his son Alfred and tells Ecbert that in the end, Athelstan chose Christ. On the road, Ragnar has visions of his younger days and of a discussion with the Seer, where he denounces his belief in the gods. Ragnar arrives in Northumbria and is tortured by Aelle. Ecbert travels there in disguise to attend Ragnar's execution. Ragnar says that he dies without apology and welcomes death, and will await his sons in Valhalla to hear stories of their triumphs. Ragnar is then dropped into a pit of snakes where he is bitten to death. Ivar returns to Kattegat, to discover that his mother has been killed by Lagertha. Across the fjord, a longship carrying a black-cloaked figure, missing his right eye, approaches.
45	16	"Crossings"	Ciarán Donnelly	Michael Hirst	January 4, 2017
Lagertha in Norway and Aethelwulf in Wessex consider the consequences of Ragnar's death, while his sons start to plan their revenge. Lagertha orders defences to be built around Kattegat. Ivar challenges Lagertha to single combat, but is refused, and promises that one day he will kill Lagertha. Meanwhile, Bjorn and Rollo reach Al-Andalus (today Spain and Portugal) and raid Algeciras, as Halfdan and Harald start plotting to overthrow the Lothbroks as part of their conquest of all of Norway. Floki is intrigued by his first contact with Islam and forces the Vikings to spare men praying in a mosque. After Floki refuses to have another child with Helga, she kidnaps an Arabized Berber child, Tanaruz, as her daughter. The man in the black cloak – an incarnation of the god Odin – brings news of Ragnar's death to his sons. The Seer tells Lagertha he foresees that she will be killed by one of Ragnar's sons, while Ivar prepares a new sword and dreams of his revenge.
46	17	"The Great Army"	Jeff Woolnough	Michael Hirst	January 11, 2017
Ubbe, Sigurd, and Ivar decide to gather a large army and return to England to avenge Ragnar. Before returning to Gisla and his children, Rollo offers land in Normandy to any Norsemen willing to settle, but is rejected. Halfdan introduces Harald to Egil, the bastard son of an earl. Judith visits her family in Northumbria and tries to convince King Aelle to ally with Ecbert against the coming attack. However, her father shows no intention of reforging an alliance with Wessex. Ubbe frees Margrethe and tells her that he would like to marry her. In Wessex, Ecbert continues to groom Alfred as future king and warns him not to trust others, but to think for himself. An armada of Swedish Vikings, led by Earl Jorgensen, arrives to join the Lothbroks. Ivar and Ubbe attempt to kill Lagertha, but are stopped by Bjorn, who makes clear that his brothers will have to kill him before Lagertha. Torvi advises Bjorn not to join Ivar, which causes Bjorn to lash out against her. Bjorn leaves her in a fit of rage and has an encounter with Astrid. Floki presents Ivar with a war chariot which will enable him to lead troops in combat.
47	18	"Revenge"	Jeff Woolnough	Michael Hirst	January 18, 2017
As the great army assembles, Bjorn and Ivar argue over its leadership. Harald spots Ellisif, the woman he fell in love with years ago, who he had wanted to impress by conquering Norway. But she has since married a Danish earl, of lower status than him. Ubbe and Margrethe are married, but Ubbe agrees to share her with Hvitserk. Helga wants to join the great army with Tanaruz, but Floki is not happy with her decision. Harald and Halfdan have Egil infiltrate Kattegat. Halfdan suggests Harald kill Ellisif to regain his honor, but Harald refuses because she is the only woman he loves. Earl Jorgensen volunteers to be sacrificed to assure victory in the coming war, while Bjorn and Astrid continue their affair. Aethelwulf confronts Ecbert about his affair with Judith and questions Ecbert's love for him and his ability as a king. Ecbert asks him to lead the defence against the Norse invaders. As the great army lands in Northumbria, King Aelle's much smaller army is overrun, Aelle is captured, and killed by the blood eagle.
48	19	"On the Eve"	Ben Bolt	Michael Hirst	January 25, 2017
Kattegat is attacked by Egil and his men, but they are repulsed and Egil is captured. Torvi is severely injured. Under torture, Egil confesses to Lagertha that he had been paid by King Harald to attack her. Meanwhile, in Mercia, terrified villagers flee before the advancing heathen army. Harald pretends to forgive Ellisif, then kills her husband Vik. Ellisif later pretends to forgive Harald, seduces him, and is about to kill him but is instead killed by Halfdan. Tanaruz runs away from Helga, but Floki manages to find her and convince her to return. Prince Aethelwulf gathers a large army in Wessex and moves to intercept the advancing Vikings in Repton. Before they meet, Ivar persuades Bjorn to scout a potential battlefield and plan to use the terrain to defeat the Saxons. The Vikings then harass the Saxons on the battlefield with archers hidden in the surrounding woods. Prince Aethelwulf decides to move his forces toward the Vikings' ships, but the Vikings then ambush them in a tight valley. In panic and frustration, Aethelwulf orders a charge.
49	20	"The Reckoning"	Ben Bolt	Michael Hirst	February 1, 2017
The Saxons charge into the Norse shield wall and suffer heavy losses. Aethelwulf orders a retreat and flees to Ecbert's capital to ready its evacuation. Ecbert refuses to leave and cedes the crown of Wessex to his son. The bishop Edmund refuses to abandon Ecbert. The Vikings arrive and Hvitserk kills Edmund. Ecbert is captured and Tanaruz stabs Helga and then commits suicide. Ivar demands the blood eagle for Ecbert, but Bjorn reminds his brothers of Ragnar's dream of settlement and agrees to allow Ecbert to choose his own death in exchange for signing over East Anglia. Ecbert then kills himself in his Roman bath. After burying Helga, Floki takes to the sea. Bjorn shares his wish to raid the Mediterranean, while Ivar proposes continued raids in England. In an argument over what action to take next, Sigurd starts to insult Ivar and mock his impotence, Ivar then kills Sigurd with an axe. In Sherborne, Bishop Heahmund oversees a funeral and then has sex with the widow of the deceased.

== Production ==
=== Development ===
Vikings is an Irish-Canadian co-production presented by Metro-Goldwyn-Mayer. The fourth season was developed and produced by Octagon Films for the first sixteen episodes, TM Productions for the last four episodes, and Take 5 Productions. Morgan O'Sullivan, Sheila Hockin, Sherry Marsh, Alan Gasmer, James Flynn, John Weber, and Michael Hirst are credited as executive producers. This season was produced by Keith Thompson for the first eight and for the last four episodes, and Sanne Wohlenberg for the ninth to sixteenth episodes. Bill Goddard and Séamus McInerney are co-producers.

The production team for this season includes casting directors Frank and Nuala Moiselle, costume designer Joan Bergin, visual effects supervisor Dominic Remane, stunt action designers Franklin Henson and Richard Ryan, composer Trevor Morris, production designer Mark Geraghty, editors Aaron Marshall for the first, fourth, seventh, fifteenth and eighteenth episodes, Christopher Donaldson for the second, fifth and eighth episodes, Tad Seaborn for the third, sixth, ninth, eleventh, thirteenth, sixteenth and nineteenth episodes, and Don Cassidy for the tenth, twelfth, fourteenth, seventeenth and twentieth episodes, and cinematographers PJ Dillon for the first eight and last four episodes, and Owen McPolin for the ninth to sixteenth episodes.

=== Music ===
The Vikings IV (Music from the TV Series)

Soundtrack album by Trevor Morris
- Released: December 27, 2019
- Genre: Soundtrack
- Length: 177:46
- Label: Sony Classical Records

The musical score for the fourth season was composed by Trevor Morris in collaboration with Einar Selvik. The opening sequence is again accompanied by the song "If I Had a Heart" by Fever Ray.

The soundtrack album was released on December 27, 2019, by Sony Classical Records. An additional original song not included in the album is "Snake Pit Poetry", written by Einar Selvik and performed by Hilda Örvarsdóttir, and featured in "All His Angels". The track was released as a single on October 20, 2017, together with a second version solely performed by Selvik.

Additional non-original music by Norwegian music group Wardruna is featured in the episodes "In the Uncertain Hour Before the Morning" and "Crossings". The featured tracks are "Bjarkan", "Laukr" and "Algir — Tognatale".

Track listing
No.	Title	Length
1.	"Truth From the Seer"	4:07
2.	"A Call to Justice"	1:38
3.	"Arrested"	1:01
4.	"Desperate Measures"	0:53
5.	"Ragnar Learns of the Arrest"	1:50
6.	"Execution Day"	1:55
7.	"Ambush"	3:03
8.	"Alone in the Snow"	1:18
9.	"Fleeing Kattegat"	0:34
10.	"Survival Tactics"	1:06
11.	"Floki's Path"	1:02
12.	"Ragnar Tells a Story"	4:41
13.	"The Gift of Freedom"	2:52
14.	"Visions of the Seer"	2:00
15.	"Making Love"	0:53
16.	"Ragnar Frees Yidu"	1:08
17.	"Assassination Attempt"	1:19
18.	"Bjorn Kills Assassin"	3:02
19.	"Ragnar and Yidu Get High"	2:28
20.	"Rivalries"	1:19
21.	"Arrival at Kattegat"	0:43
22.	"The Barber of Kattegat"	4:11
23.	"Lagertha's Wisdom"	1:03
24.	"Landfall in France"	1:37
25.	"A Stranger Returns"	1:29
26.	"Ragnar Dreams of Home"	1:41
27.	"Fate Awaits"	2:19
28.	"To War"	4:11
29.	"Tower Attack"	3:46
30.	"Radical Plan"	3:29
31.	"Retreat"	4:00
32.	"Devastation"	1:46
33.	"Demands for Darkness"	1:02
34.	"Visions of Kattegat"	3:02
35.	"The Mind of a Viking"	1:14
36.	"A Feat of Engineering"	1:36
37.	"A Witness to Death"	1:40
38.	"To Kill and be Killed"	3:24
39.	"Enemy Eyes Are Watching"	1:36
40.	"Floki's Vision"	1:02
41.	"Meeting of Minds"	2:23
42.	"Counter Attack"	3:22
43.	"The Second Battle"	7:08
44.	"Who Wants to Be King?"	2:41
45.	"A Challenge Accepted"	2:20
46.	"Ivar's Frustration"	2:41
47.	"Old Lovers, No Regrets"	1:50
48.	"Solitary Journey"	1:21
49.	"Bjorn's Fleet Arrival"	1:10
50.	"Making Peace"	1:18
51.	"Aslaug's Dark Dreams"	1:26
52.	"One Son"	1:32
53.	"The Will of the Gods"	3:57
54.	"Meeting at Sea"	2:12
55.	"Visions of Violence to Come"	1:11
56.	"Keel-Hauled"	3:27
57.	"Lagertha Takes Kattegat"	4:33
58.	"Regicide"	1:25
59.	"Lighting of Funeral Boats"	0:53
60.	"Ubbe Attempts Revenge"	1:58
61.	"Un-Caged"	3:44
62.	"Athelstan's Legacy"	1:28
63.	"Terrible Choice"	2:54
64.	"Dreams of the Past"	1:01
65.	"Death of a Legend"	2:26
66.	"Ghosts of the Past"	1:25
67.	"Mysterious Lands"	2:06
68.	"There Will Be Blood"	1:36
69.	"Rollo's Choice"	2:39
70.	"Sacrifice Begins"	2:18
71.	"Sacrifice Ends"	1:57
72.	"Aelle's Army"	2:00
73.	"Eyes on Kattegat"	2:27
74.	"Dark Sails"	1:00
75.	"Army of Darkness"	5:10
76.	"State of Confusion"	3:39
77.	"Surrounded"	2:35
78.	"The Great Heathen Army"	2:47
79.	"Ecbert's Choice"	2:05
80.	"A New Force Emerges"	0:41
Total length:		177:46

== Reception ==
=== Critical response ===
Both parts of the fourth season of Vikings received very positive reviews. The review aggregator website Rotten Tomatoes reported a 92% approval rating, with an average rating of 8.3/10 based on twelve reviews. The critical consensus reads: "Vikings returns for another season of fantastic performances, epic battles, and sharp writing sure to please its barbarous hordes of fans."
