= List of awards and nominations received by Vikings =

Vikings awards and nominations
Awards and nominations
Award	Wins	Nominations
ASC Awards	0	1
Canadian Cinema Editors Awards	0	1
Canadian Screen Awards	12	19
Critics Choice Television Awards	0	1
Directors Guild of Canada Awards	8	6
Emmy Awards	1	12
Golden Maple Awards	0	3
Golden Reel Awards	0	6
IGN Awards	0	3
Irish Film and Television Awards	8	15
Makeup Artist and Hair Stylist Guild Awards	0	5
OFTA Television Awards	0	2
Satellite Awards	1	0
Saturn Awards	0	1
VES Awards	1	9
Women's Image Network Awards	2	3
Young Artist Awards	0	1

Totals (Note: Certain award groups do not simply award one winner. They acknowledge several different recipients, have runners-up, and have third place. Since this is a specific recognition and is different from losing an award, runner-up mentions are considered wins in this award tally. For simplification and to avoid errors, each award in this list has been presumed to have had a prior nomination.)
- Wins: 33
- Nominations: 88

Vikings is a historical drama television series. Vikings is inspired by the sagas of Viking Ragnar Lothbrok, one of the best-known legendary Norse heroes and notorious as the scourge of England and France.

== Total nominations and awards for the cast ==
Actor	Nominations	Awards
Katheryn Winnick	6	0
Moe Dunford	3	1
Alexander Ludwig	2	1
Travis Fimmel	1	1
Jessalyn Gilsig	1	0
Nathan O'Toole	1	0

== ASC Awards ==
The American Society of Cinematographers presents the annual ASC Awards to recognize outstanding cinematography in film and television. Vikings has been nominated once.

Year	Category	Nominee	Result	Reference
2014	Outstanding Achievement in Cinematography in Regular Series	PJ Dillon (episode: Blood Eagle)	Nominated	

== Canadian Cinema Editors Awards ==
The Canadian Cinema Editors is a non-profit organization that promotes the art and science of picture editing in all media. They host annual awards honoring professional film editors. Vikings has been nominated once.

Year	Category	Nominee	Result	Reference
2017	Best Editing in 1 Hour Scripted	Aaron Marshall (episode: All His Angels)	Nominated	

== Canadian Screen Awards ==
The Canadian Screen Awards are given annually by the Academy of Canadian Cinema & Television recognizing excellence in Canadian film, English-language television, and digital media. Vikings has been nominated twenty two times, winning nine awards.

Year	Category	Nominee	Result	Reference
2014	Best Direction in a Dramatic Series	Ken Girotti (episode: The Sacrifice)	Nominated	
2014	Best International Drama	Michael Hirst, Sheila Hockin, John Weber, Morgan O'Sullivan, James Flynn, Alan Gasmer, Sherry Marsh	Nominated	
2014	Best Performance by an Actress in a Continuing Leading Dramatic Role	Katheryn Winnick	Nominated	
2014	Best Photography in a Dramatic Program or Series	John Bartley (episode: A King's Ransom)	Nominated	
2014	Best Picture Editing in a Dramatic Program or Series	Aaron Marshall (episode: A King's Ransom)	Nominated	
2014	Best Visual Effects	Bill Halliday, Dennis Berardi, Dominic Remane, Jim Maxwell, Julian Parry, Maria Gordon, Michael Borrett, Ovidiu Cinazan, Paul Wishart, Wilson Cameron (episode: Dispossessed)	Won	
2015	Best Direction in a Dramatic Series	Kari Skogland (episode: Blood Eagle)	Nominated	
2015	Best International Drama	John Weber, Sheila Hockin, Michael Hirst, Morgan O'Sullivan, James Flynn, Alan Gasmer, Sherry Marsh	Won	
2015	Best Sound in a Dramatic Program or Series	Jane Tattersall, David McCallum, Steve Medeiros, Stephen Muir, Robert Warchol, Martin Lee, Kirk Lynds, Dale Sheldrake, Yuri Gorbachow, Goro Koyama, Andy Malcolm, Daniel Birch (episode: The Choice)	Won	
2015	Best Visual Effects	Dennis Berardi, Michael Borrett, Ovidiu Cinazan, Jeremy Dineen, Maria Gordon, Bill Halliday, Eric Lacroix, Jim Maxwell, Julian Parry, Dominic Remane (episode: Invasion)	Won	
2016	Best Direction in a Dramatic Series	Helen Shaver (episode: Born Again)	Nominated	
2016	Best Direction in a Dramatic Series	Kelly Makin (episode: To the Gates)	Nominated	
2016	Best International Drama	James Flynn, Alan Gasmer, Bill Goddard, Michael Hirst, Sheila Hockin, Sherry Marsh, Morgan O'Sullivan, John Weber	Won	
2016	Best Picture Editing in a Dramatic Program or Series	Aaron Marshall (episode: Warrior’s Fate)	Nominated	
2016	Best Sound in a Comedy or Dramatic Program or Series	Yuri Gorbachow, Jack Heeren, Goro Koyama, Martin Lee, Kirk Lynds, Andy Malcolm, David McCallum, Steve Medeiros, Dale Sheldrake, Jane Tattersall, Daniel Birch, Sandra Fox (episode: To the Gates)	Nominated	
2016	Best Visual Effects	Engin Arslan, Dennis Berardi, Michael Borrett, Ovidiu Cinazan, Jeremy Dineen, Maria Gordon, Bill Halliday, Leann Harvey, Ken MacKenzie, Dominic Remane, Paul Wishart, Julian Parry (episode: To the Gates)	Won	
2017	Best Dramatic Series	Sheila Hockin, John Weber, Michael Hirst, Morgan O'Sullivan, James Flynn, Alan Gasmer, Sherry Marsh, Bill Godard	Nominated	
2017	Best Achievement in Casting	Deirdre Bowen (episode: Yol)	Nominated	
2017	Best Direction in a Dramatic Series	Jeff Woolnough (episode: The Last Ship)	Nominated	
2017	Best Direction in a Dramatic Series	Helen Shaver (episode: Promised)	Nominated	
2017	Best Direction in a Lifestyle or Information Program or Series	Frank Samson (Vikings Season 4 Special)	Won	
2017	Best Picture Editing in a Dramatic Program or Series	Aaron Marshall (episode: The Profit and the Loss)	Nominated	
2017	Best Picture Editing in a Dramatic Program or Series	Christopher Donaldson (episode: Kill the Queen)	Nominated	
2017	Best Picture Editing in a Dramatic Program or Series	Don Cassidy (episode: The Last Ship)	Nominated	
2017	Best Sound in a Comedy or Dramatic Program or Series	Jane Tattersall, Steve Medeiros, Brennan Mercer, David McCallum, Dale Sheldrake, Martin Lee, Kirk Lynds, Yuri Gorbachow, Daniel Birch, Goro Koyama, Jack Heeren (episode: The Last Ship)	Won	
2017	Best Visual Effects	Dominic Remane, Bill Halliday, Michael Borrett, Kieran McKay, Jim Maxwell, Paul Wishart, Ovidiu Cinazan, Jeremy Dineen, Tom Morrison, Leann Harvey (episode: The Last Ship)	Won	
2018	Best Dramatic Series	Sheila Hockin, John Weber, Michael Hirst, Morgan O'Sullivan, James Flynn, Alan Gasmer, Sherry Marsh, Bill Goddard	Nominated	
2018	Best Direction in a Dramatic Series	Jeff Woolnough (episode: Revenge)	Nominated	
2018	Best Sound in Fiction	Martin Lee, Ian Rankin, Daniel Birch, Brent Pickett, Dale Sheldrake, Steve Medeiros, Brennan Mercer, Jane Tattersall, David McCallum, Goro Koyama, Yuri Gorbachow (episode: The Reckoning)	Won	
2018	Best Visual Effects	Bill Halliday, Dominic Remane, Michael Borrett, Paul Wishart, Ovidiu Cinazan, Jim Maxwell, Kieran McKay, Isabelle Alles, Thomas Morrison, Leann Harvey (episode: On The Eve)	Won	
2018	Best Lead Actor in a Drama Series	Alexander Ludwig	Won	

== Critics Choice Television Awards ==
The Critics' Choice Television Awards are presented annually by Broadcast Television Journalists Association. Vikings has been nominated once.

Year	Category	Nominee	Result	Reference
2015	Best Supporting Actress in a Drama Series	Katheryn Winnick	Nominated	

== Directors Guild of Canada Awards ==
The Directors Guild of Canada hosts an annual awards ceremony recognizing achievement in directing, production design, picture and sound editing. Vikings has won five out of eleven nominations.

Year	Category	Nominee	Result	Reference
2014	Best Picture Editing - Television Series	Aaron Marshall (episode: A King's Ransom)	Nominated	
2014	Best Sound Editing - Television Series	Claire Dobson, Andrew Jablonski, David McCallum, Steve Medeiros, Brennan Mercer, Dale Sheldrake and Jane Tattersall (episode: Trial)	Won	
2015	Best Television Series - Drama	Kari Skogland, Steve Wakefield, Camille Mansfield, Jane Tattersall, Steve Medeiros, David McCallum, Dale Sheldrake, Brennan Mercer, Andrew Jablonski, Aaron Marshall, Dan Briceno, Brandy Hamilton (episode: Blood Eagle)	Nominated	
2015	Best Direction - Television Series	Kari Skogland (episode: Blood Eagle)	Won	
2015	Best Picture Editing - Television Series	Don Cassidy (episode: The Lord's Prayer)	Won	
2015	Best Picture Editing - Television Series	Aaron Marshall (episode: Blood Eagle)	Nominated	
2015	Best Sound Editing - Television Series	Jane Tattersall, Steve Medeiros, David McCallum, Dale Sheldrake, Yuri Gorbachow, Brennan Mercer, Andrew Jablonski (episode: The Choice)	Won	
2016	Outstanding Directorial Achievement in Dramatic Series	Helen Shaver (episode: Born Again)	Won	
2016	Outstanding Directorial Achievement in Dramatic Series	Jeff Woolnough (episode: A Warrior's Fate)	Nominated	
2016	Outstanding Directorial Achievement in Dramatic Series	Kelly Makin (episode: To The Gates)	Nominated	
2016	Outstanding Directorial Achievement in Dramatic Series	Ken Girotti (episode: The Dead)	Nominated	
2017	Outstanding Directorial Achievement in Dramatic Series	Helen Shaver (episode: Promised)	Won	
2017	Best Picture Editing - Television Series	Donald Cassidy (episode: In the Uncertain Hour Before the Morning)	Won	
2017	Best Sound Editing - Television Series	Claire Dobson, Andrew Jablonski, David McCallum, Steve Medeiros, Brennan Mercer, Dale Sheldrake, Jane Tattersall, Yuri Gorbachow (episode: The Last Ship)	Won	

== Emmy Awards ==
The Emmy Awards recognizes excellence in television production and is considered one of the top honors in the industry. Vikings has received eight nominations.

Year	Category	Nominee	Result	Reference
2013	Outstanding Main Title Design	Rama Allen, Audrey Davis, Ryan McKenna, Westley Sarokin, Daniel Morris	Nominated	
2013	Outstanding Sound Editing for a Series	Jane Tattersall, Steve Medeiros, David McCallum, Brent Pickett, Dale Sheldrake, Yuri Gorbachow, Goro Koyama, Andy Malcolm (episode: Trial)	Nominated	
2013	Outstanding Special Visual Effects in a Supporting Role	Dennis Berardi, Julian Parry, Bill Halliday, Wilson Cameron, Dominic Remane, Jim Maxwell, Ovidiu Cinazan, MariaGordon, Mike Borrett (episode: Dispossessed)	Nominated	
2014	Outstanding Special and Visual Effects in a Supporting Role	Dominic Remane, Julian Parry, Dennis Berardi, Michael Borrett, Bill Halliday, Ovidiu Cinazan, Maria Gordon, Jim Maxwell, Jeremy Dineen (episode: Invasion)	Nominated	
2015	Outstanding Special Visual Effects	Michael Borrett, Bill Halliday, Julian Parry, Dominic Remane, Ovidiu Cinazan, Jeremy Dineen, Paul Wishart, Engin Arslan, Ken MacKenzie (episode: To The Gates)	Nominated	
2016	Outstanding Makeup for a Single-Camera Series (Non-Prosthetic)	Tom McInerney, Katie Derwin, Ciara Scannell (episode: Yol)	Nominated	
2016	Outstanding Sound Editing for a Series	Jane Tattersall, David McCallum, Dale Sheldrake, Steve Medeiros, Brennan Mercer, Yuri Gorbachow, Andy Malcolm, Goro Koyama (episode: The Last Ship)	Nominated	
2016	Outstanding Special Visual Effects	Dominic Remane, Bill Halliday, Michael Borrett, Paul Wishart, Ovidiu Cinazan, Jim Maxwell, Kieran McKay, Jeremy Dineen, Tom Morrison (episode: The Last Ship)	Nominated	
2017	Outstanding Hairstyling for a Single-Camera Series	Dee Corcoran, Catherine Argue, Jenny Readman, Ida Erickson & Zuelika Delaney (episode: Revenge)	Nominated	
2017	Outstanding Makeup for a Single-Camera Series (Non-Prosthetic)	Tom McInerney, Katie Derwin, Ciara Scanell, Lizzanne Procter (episode: All His Angels)	Nominated	
2017	Outstanding Special Visual Effects	Dominic Remane, Michael Borrett, Bill Halliday, Paul Wishart, Ovidiu Cinazan, Jim Maxwell, Kiernan McKay, Isabelle Alles, Tom Morrison (episode: On the Eve)	Nominated	
2018	Outstanding Makeup for a Single-Camera Series (Non-Prosthetic)	Tom McInerney, Katie Derwin, Lizzanne Procter, Ciara Scannel, Deirdre Fitzgerald, Kate Donnelly (episode: Homeland)	Nominated	
2020	Outstanding Special Visual Effects In A Supporting Role	Dominic Remane, Visual Effects Supervisor; Bill Halliday, Becca Donohue, Leann Harvey, Tom Morrison, Ovidiu Cinazan, Jim Maxwell, Ezra Waddell & Warren Lawtey, (episode: The Best Laid Plans)	Won	

== Golden Maple Awards ==
The Golden Maple Awards are annual awards presented by the Academy of Canadians in Sports and Entertainment – Los Angeles to Canadian actors performing in television shows broadcast in the United States. Vikings has been nominated three times.

Year	Category	Nominee	Result	Reference
2015	Best Actor in a TV Series Broadcasted in the US	Alexander Ludwig	Nominated	
2015	Best Actress in a TV Series Broadcasted in the US	Jessalyn Gilsig	Nominated	
2015	Best Actress in a TV Series Broadcasted in the US	Katheryn Winnick	Nominated	

== Golden Reel Awards ==
The Golden Reel Awards are given annually by the Motion Picture Sound Editors. Vikings has been nominated three times.

Year	Category	Nominee	Result	Reference
2013	Best Sound Editing - Sound Effects and Foley for Episodic Short Form Broadcast Media	Jane Tattersall, Steve Medeiros, Brennan Mercer, Goro Koyama, Andy Malcolm (episode: "Trial")	Nominated	
2014	Best Sound Editing - Sound Effects and Foley for Episodic Short Form Broadcast Media	David McCallum, Jane Tattersall, Steve Medeiros, Andy Malcolm, Brennan Mercer, Sandra Fox, Goro Koyama (episode: "Answers in Blood")	Nominated	
2015	Best Sound Editing – Dialogue and ADR for Episodic Short Form Broadcast Media	Jane Tattersall, David McCallum, Dale Sheldrake (episode: "Breaking Point")	Nominated	
2015	Best Sound Editing - Sound Effects and Foley for Episodic Short Form Broadcast Media	Jane Tattersall, Steve Medeiros, Brennan Mercer, Sandra Fox, Goro Koyama (episode: "To the Gates!")	Nominated	
2017	Best Sound Editing - Short Form Dialogue and ADR in Television	Jane Tattersall, David McCallum, Dale Sheldrake (episode: Breaking Point)	Nominated	
2017	Best Sound Editing - Short Form Sound Effects and Foley in Television	Jane Tattersall, Steve Medeiros, Brennan Mercer, Goro Koyama, Sandra Fox (episode: To the Gates)	Nominated	

== IGN Awards ==
The IGN Awards are chosen annually by the IGN editors, honoring the best in film, television, games, comics and anime. Vikings has been nominated three times.

Year	Category	Nominee	Result	Reference
2013	Best TV Hero	Travis Fimmel	Nominated	
2014	Best TV Action Series	Vikings	Nominated	
2015	Best TV Action Series	Vikings	Nominated	

== Irish Film and Television Awards ==
The Irish Film and Television Awards are presented annually by the Irish Film & Television Academy. Vikings has garnered twenty three nominations, resulting in eight awards.

Year	Category	Nominee	Result	Reference
2014	Best Costume Design	Joan Bergin	Nominated	
2014	Best Production Design	Tom Conroy	Won	
2015	Best Make-Up & Hair	Tom McInerney & Dee Corcoran	Won	
2015	Best Director - Drama	Ciaran Donnelly	Won	
2015	Best Costume Design	Joan Bergin	Nominated	
2015	Best Production Design	Mark Geraghty	Nominated	
2015	Best Production Design	Tom Conroy	Won	
2016	Best Actor in a Supporting Role in Drama	Moe Dunford	Won	
2016	Best Costume Design	Joan Bergin	Won	
2016	Best Drama	Vikings	Nominated	
2016	Best Makeup & Hair	Lorraine Glynn and Morna Ferguson	Nominated	
2016	Best Cinematography	P.J. Dillon	Nominated	
2017	Best Drama	Morgan O'Sullivan & James Flynn	Won	
2017	Best Hair & Make-Up	Dee Corcoran & Tom McInerney	Won	
2017	Best Actor in a Supporting Role in Drama	Moe Dunford	Nominated	
2017	Best Director - Drama	Ciaran Donnelly	Nominated	
2017	Best Production Design	Mark Geraghty	Nominated	
2018	Best Drama	Morgan O'Sullivan & James Flynn	Nominated	
2018	Best Director - Drama	Steve Saint Leger	Nominated	
2018	Best Actor in a Supporting Role in Drama	Moe Dunford	Nominated	
2018	Best Costume Design	Susan O'Connor Cave	Nominated	
2018	Best Hair & Make-Up	Dee Corcoran & Tom McInerney	Nominated	
2018	Best Production Design	Mark Geraghty	Nominated	

== Makeup Artist and Hair Stylist Guild Awards ==
The Make-Up Artists & Hair Stylists Guild is the official labor union for make-up artists and hair stylists in film, television, stage, commercials and digital media. The annual awards recognize artistic achievement from its members. Vikings has received four nominations.

Year	Category	Nominee	Result	Reference
2014	Best Period and/or Character Hair Styling - Television and New Media Series	Dee Corcoran	Nominated	
2014	Best Special Makeup Effects - Television and New Media Series	Tom McInerney	Nominated	
2016	Best Period and/or Character Hair Styling - Television and New Media Series	Dee Corcoran	Nominated	
2016	Best Special Makeup Effects - Television and New Media Series	Tom McInerney	Nominated	
2018	Best Period and/or Character Hair Styling - Television and New Media Series	Dee Corcoran, Zuelika Delaney, Peter Burke	Nominated	

== OFTA Television Awards ==
The OFTA Television Awards are presented annually by the Online Film & Television Association. Vikings has been nominated twice.

Year	Category	Nominee	Result	Reference
2016	Best Makeup/Hairstyling in a Series		Nominated	
2016	Best Sound in a Series		Nominated	

== Satellite Awards ==
The Satellite Awards are annual awards given by the International Press Academy.

Year	Category	Nominee	Result	Reference
2018	Best Television Series - Drama	Vikings	Won	

== Saturn Awards ==
The Saturn Awards are awarded annually by the Academy of Science Fiction, Fantasy and Horror Films to honor science fiction, fantasy, and horror in film and television. Vikings has been nominated once.

Year	Category	Nominee	Result	Reference
2014	Best Television Presentation	Vikings	Nominated	

== VES Awards ==
Visual Effects Society honors achievement in visual effects in film, television, commercials, music videos and video games. Vikings has been nominated nine times, and won once.

Year	Category	Nominee	Result	Reference
2014	Outstanding Compositing in a Broadcast Program	Ovidiu Cinazan, Gary Couto, Marco Lee, Maria Gordon (episode: Dispossessed)	Nominated	
2015	Outstanding Effects Simulations in a Commercial, Broadcast Program, or Video Game	Jeremy Dineen, Eric Lacroix, Kyle Yoneda, Ran Long Wen (episode: Invasion)	Nominated	
2015	Outstanding Compositing in a Photoreal/Live Action Broadcast Program	Ovidiu Cinazan, Gary Couto, Doug Cook, Meng Angel Li (episode: Invasion)	Nominated	
2016	Outstanding Supporting Visual Effects in a Photoreal Episode	Dominic Remane, Bill Halliday, Paul Wishart, Ovidiu Cinazan, Paul Byrne (episode: To the Gates)	Won	
2016	Outstanding Created Environment in an Episode, Commercial, or Real-Time Project	Paul Wishart, Karol Wlodarczyk, Tom Morrison, Matt Ralph (episode: Paris)	Nominated	
2016	Outstanding Compositing in a Photoreal Episode	Ovidiu Cinazan, Olivia Yapp, Greg Lamar, Meng Angel Li (episode: To the Gates)	Nominated	
2017	Outstanding Supporting Visual Effects in a Photoreal Episode	Dominic Remane, Mike Borrett, Ovidiu Cinazan, Paul Wishart, Paul Byrne (episode: The Last Ship)	Nominated	
2018	Outstanding Supporting Visual Effects in a Photoreal Episode	Dominic Remane, Mike Borrett, Ovidiu Cinazan, Paul Wishart, Paul Byrne (episode: On the Eve)	Nominated	
2020	Outstanding Supporting Visual Effects in a Photoreal Episode	Dominic Remane, Mike Borrett, Ovidiu Cinazan, Tom Morrison, Paul Byrne (for What Happens in the Cave)	Nominated	
2021	Outstanding Supporting Visual Effects in a Photoreal Episode	Dominic Remane, Bill Halliday, Tom Morrison, Ovidiu Cinazan, Paul Byrne (for Best Laid Plans)	Nominated	

== Women's Image Network Awards ==
Women's Image Network Awards are annual awards presented to individuals who promote women and girls in the media. Vikings has been nominated five times, with director Helen Shaver winning two awards.

Year	Category	Nominee	Result	Reference
2014	Actress Drama Series	Katheryn Winnick	Nominated	
2015	Outstanding Show Directed By a Woman	Helen Shaver	Won	
2015	Actress Drama Series	Katheryn Winnick	Nominated	
2016	Actress Drama Series	Katheryn Winnick	Nominated	
2017	Outstanding Show Directed By a Woman	Helen Shaver	Won	

== Young Artist Awards ==
The Young Artist Awards are awarded annually to young actors in film and television. Vikings has been nominated once.

Year	Category	Nominee	Result	Reference
2014	Best Performance in a TV Series - Recurring Young Actor	Nathan O'Toole	Nominated	
