= All His Angels =

- Vikings episode
- Episode no.: Season 4 Episode 15
- Directed by: Ciarán Donnelly
- Written by: Michael Hirst
- Cinematography by: Owen McPolin
- Editing by: Tad Seaborn
- Original air date: December 28, 2016
- Running time: 44 minutes

Guest appearances
- Josefin Asplund as Astrid; George Blagden as Athelstan (Note: Archive footage only.); Ivan Kaye as King Aelle; Jennie Jacques as Princess Judith; Nathan O'Toole as young Bjorn; Isaac O'Sullivan as Prince Alfred; Dave Rowe as a guard; Brendan Conroy as the Blind Man; Ruby O'Leary as Gyda; André Eriksen as Odin

Episode chronology
← Previous "In the Uncertain Hour Before the Morning"	Next → "Crossings"
- Vikings (season 4)

"All His Angels" is the fifteenth episode of the fourth season of History's historical drama television series Vikings, and the 44th episode of the series overall. Directed by Ciarán Donnelly and written by Michael Hirst, it aired on December 28, 2016.

The episode stars Travis Fimmel, Katheryn Winnick, John Kavanagh, Moe Dunford, Alex Høgh, David Lindström, Jordan Patrick Smith, and Linus Roache. Clive Standen, Gustaf Skarsgård, Alexander Ludwig, and Alyssa Sutherland also appear in archive footage.

It received wide critical acclaim, particularly for Fimmel's performance, and it was nominated for a Primetime Emmy Award for Outstanding Makeup for a Single-Camera Series (Non-Prosthetic) at the 69th Primetime Creative Arts Emmy Awards.

== Plot ==
Ecbert (Linus Roache) visits Ragnar (Travis Fimmel) in his cell to inform him that he has arranged a ship to take his son Ivar (Alex Høgh) home later that day. Ragnar tells him that he wishes to speak to Ivar alone and Ecbert sends his guards to fetch him. Ragnar tells him that he will be handed over to King Aelle (Ivan Kaye), who will kill him. Ivar promises that he and his brothers will avenge their father's death, but Ragnar tells him that they must take revenge on Ecbert.

In Ecbert's bedroom, he and Princess Judith (Jennie Jacques) confess their love for each other. Ecbert admits that he deeply regrets committing his friend Ragnar to death. Judith says he has no choice, but Ecbert wonders if that is true and compares himself to Pontius Pilate. In the courtyard, Ragnar gives Athelstan's (George Blagden) cross to his son Alfred and tells Ecbert that in the end, Athelstan chose Christ. Ragnar is then caged in a carriage and taken away. Later that night, Ecbert takes Athelstan's priest clothes and leaves the court.

On the road, Ragnar converses with the blind driver, who says that he can "see" him, which reminds Ragnar of the Seer's (John Kavanagh) prophecy that "you will die on the day the blind man sees you". Realizing that he defied the prophecy, as he will be put to death no earlier than the day after, Ragnar now sees the Seer in the driver's place, and tells him that it was himself who guided his fate and not the gods, and that the Seer's prophecies are dangerous. The Seer admits that he has only ever groped for meaning and that he may have been wrong. Ecbert follows behind the contingent, disguised as a priest.

Ragnar arrives in Northumbria and is tortured by Aelle for days. He refuses to beg for mercy or repent his actions, remembering the happiness of his earlier years. Eventually, Aelle prepares a pit of snakes and gives Ragnar a final chance to repent his sins. Ragnar boldly recites a boastful poem about looking forward to Valhalla and the future triumphs of his sons. He is promptly dropped into the pit and killed by the snakes. Ecbert observes the execution, seemingly relieved by Ragnar's unbroken spirit.

In Kattegat, Ivar returns to discover that his mother, Aslaug, was killed by Lagertha. Across the fjord, a longship carrying a black-cloaked figure missing his right eye (André Eriksen) approaches.

== Production ==
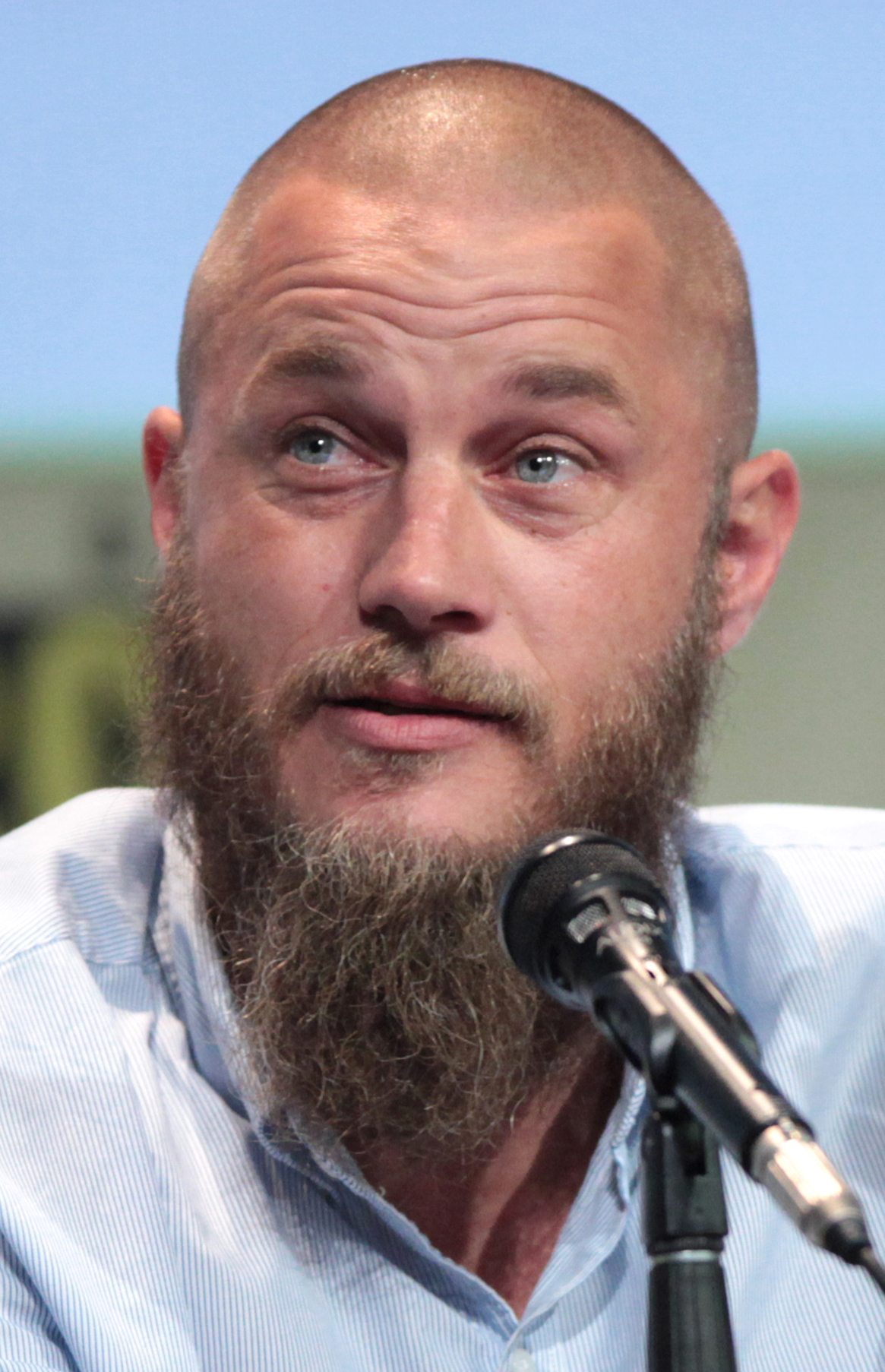
Travis Fimmel portrayed Ragnar Lothbrok.

"All His Angels" is the fifteenth episode of the fourth season, directed by Ciarán Donnelly and written by showrunner Michael Hirst. It is the 44th episode overall.

=== Writing ===
Hirst told IGN he had always intended to kill off Ragnar at some point, with the original plan being the departure of Fimmel's character in the first-season finale.

Hirst and Fimmel recalled having an argument about the delivery of Ragnar's last speech. Fimmel initially felt uneasy about it, but he was convinced of its importance and impact on Ragnar's sons: "me and Michael spoke about how the kids will find out what he said. It’s all for them, he doesn’t believe it".

=== Filming ===
Principal photography for the episode took place at Ashford Studios and on location in Ireland in mid-winter 2015–2016. Regarding Ragnar's final scene, Michael Hirst told Entertainment Weekly "it was shot in the deepest winter, in the harshest conditions, with Travis absolutely suspended in this cage, above a muddy field, in torrential freezing rain."

=== Music ===
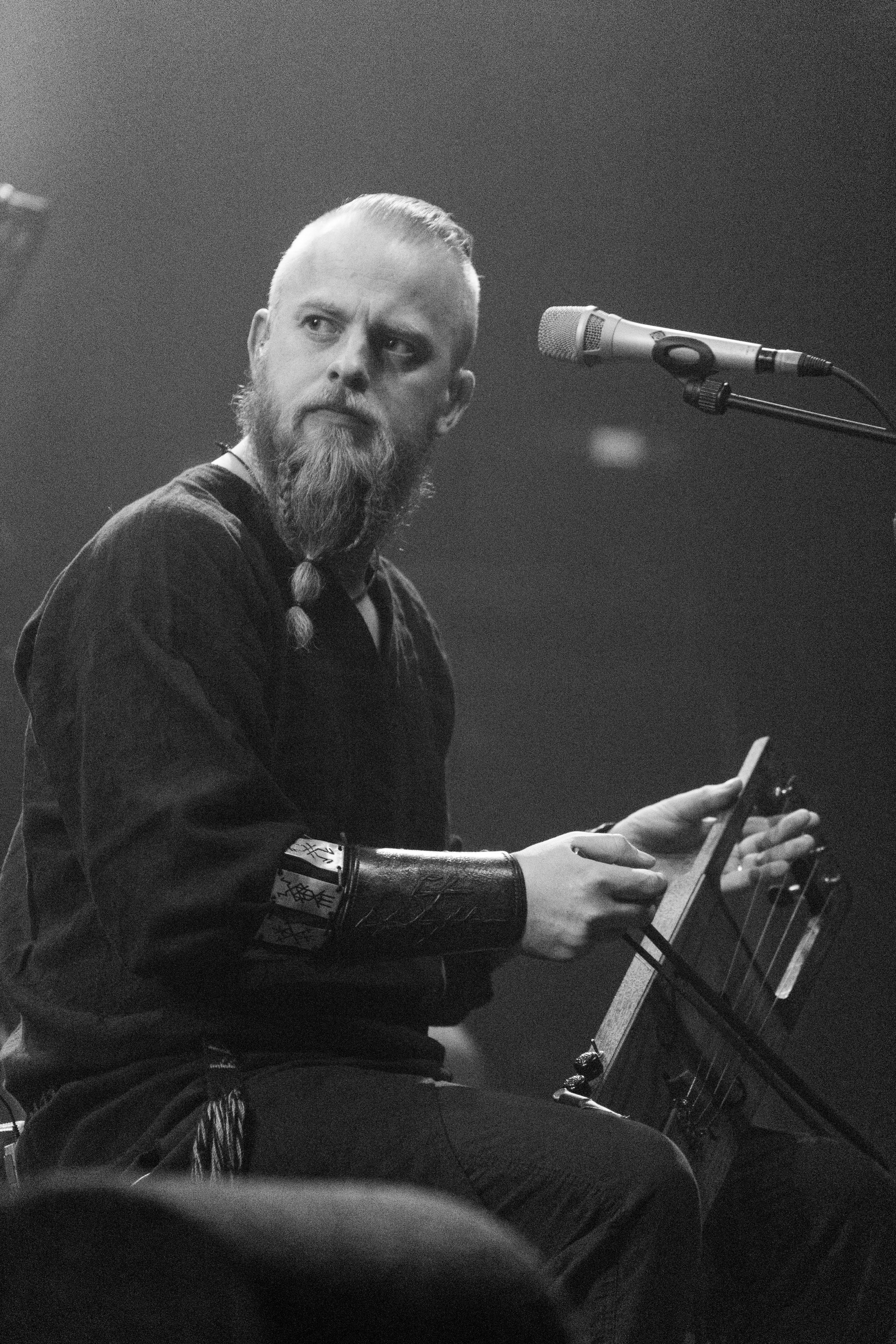
Selvik wrote "Snake Pit Poetry" specifically for this episode.

The musical score of "All His Angels" was composed by Trevor Morris. Additionally, Norwegian musician Einar Selvik, who had been working with Morris on the music of Vikings since season two, provided the ancient Norse instruments and vocals. The soundtrack album for season four features two original tracks from the episode: "Dreams of the Past" and "Death of a Legend", the latter featuring Selvik's vocals.

For "All His Angels", Selvik wrote and produced a song to accompany Ragnar's final moments, "Snake Pit Poetry". It features vocals by Icelandic singer Hilda Örvarsdóttir and it was released in an extended play on October 20, 2017, together with a second version solely performed by Selvik.

== Reception ==
=== Critical reception ===
"All His Angels" was met with positive reviews from critics. Matt Fowler of IGN gave the episode a 9.0 out of 10, stating: "'All His Angels' gave Ragnar a bold, brutal hero's exit - in the way that he planned as a man who claimed, in the end, to be the master of his own fate. It was honest and earned and hard to watch, though for a man who no longer believed in the Norse afterlife Ragnar was still heavily devoted to his people and the future of his family - thinking about what the world would become after his death, not what would happen to him in Valhalla." The A.V. Club's Dennis Perkins gave the episode a "B+" rating.

=== Accolades ===
Year	Award	Category	Nominee(s)	Result
2017	Primetime Creative Arts Emmy Awards	Outstanding Makeup for a Single-Camera Series (Non-Prosthetic)	Tom McInerney, Department Head Makeup Artist; Katie Derwin, Key Makeup Artist; Ciara Scannell, Makeup Artist; Lizanne Proctor, Makeup Artist	Nominated
