= Ragnar Lothbrok (Vikings) =

- Vikings character
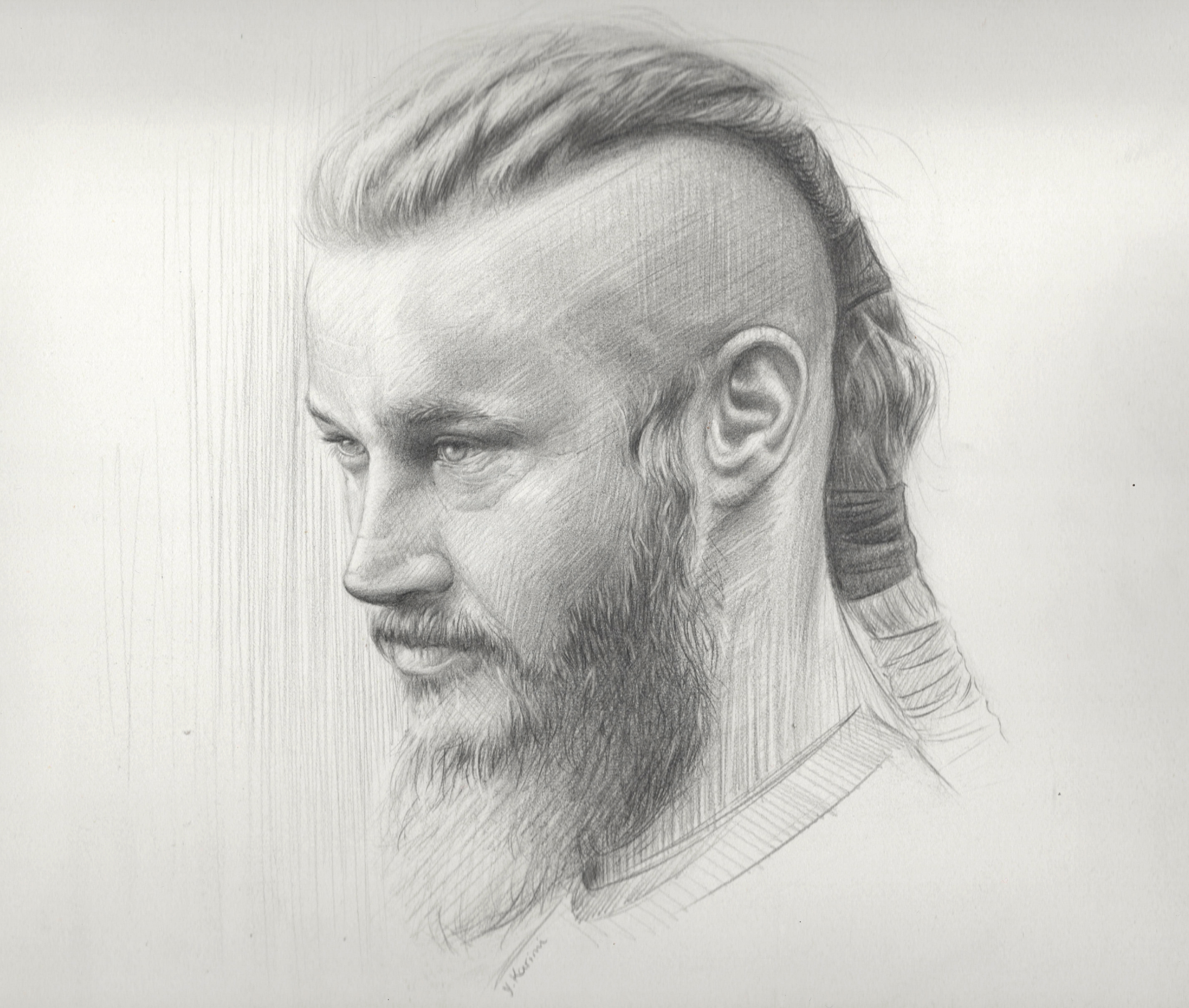
- Carbon drawing of Ragnar
- First appearance: "Rites of Passage" (2013)
- Last appearance: "All His Angels" (2016)
- Created by: Michael Hirst
- Based on: Ragnar Lodbrok
- Portrayed by: Travis Fimmel

In-universe information
- Alias: King of the Northmen
- Titles: Earl of Kattegat; King of Denmark
- Occupation: Farmer
- Spouses: Lagertha (divorced); Aslaug
- Children: Oldest to youngest: Bjorn (son, with Lagertha); Gyda (daughter, with Lagertha); Ubbe (son, with Aslaug); Hvitserk (son, with Aslaug); Sigurd (son, with Aslaug); Ivar (son, with Aslaug); Magnus (son, with Princess Kwenthrith(debated)
- Relatives: Closest to furthest: Sigurd Hribg (father); Alfhild Gandolfsdatte (mother); Rollo (brother); William (nephew); Marcellus (nephew); Celsa (niece)
- Religion: Norse paganism
- Origin: Kattegat, Norway

Ragnar "Lothbrok" Sigurdsson is a fictional character in the historical drama series Vikings, created by Canadian network History. He is portrayed by Travis Fimmel and is based on Ragnar Lodbrok, a 9th-century Viking farmer and warrior who raided Anglo-Saxon villages in England.

Throughout the first four seasons, Ragnar goes on a journey from being a farmer in his homeland jubilantly, to being a fierce Viking warrior in England and becoming an Earl, to being crowned King of Denmark after the death of King Horik. After his death, the series shifts focus onto his sons.

== Development ==
When the shows creators were looking to cast Ragnar, there were difficulties finding the right actor for his role. The shows producers considered mostly Scandinavian and English actors for the part. In an interview for the series, series creator Michael Hirst said that his wife "wasn't sure about their choice for Ragnar, and convinced him to wait a little longer for the right actor to come along." A few days later, Travis Fimmel sent in his reel, and they decided to cast him for the part.

During development of the series, series creator Michael Hirst originally wanted the series to be a one-off, with only one season airing. The series aimed to end with Ragnar dying after the first season. Hirst said: "When I was writing the show, Ragnar died at the end of season one, But actually when we were making it, I realised by the end of the season we were only on the start of Ragnar's journey." Ragnar would eventually die during the fourth season. Hirst and Fimmel recalled having an argument about the delivery of Ragnar's last speech in "All His Angels". Fimmel initially felt uneasy about it, but he was convinced of its importance and impact on Ragnar's sons, saying: "me and Michael spoke about how the kids will find out what he said. It’s all for them, he doesn’t believe it". Screen Rant commended Hirsts work on adapting Ragnar, saying: "Hirst did an incredible job creating a complex and vibrant character based closely on the historical and mythological stories of Ragnar."

== Reception ==
Ragnar's development throughout the series has received very positive reviews and is seen as the role that launched Travis Fimmel into international recognition. USA Today described Fimmel's performance in Vikings as "engaging", while The Huffington Post called it his "breakout role".

== See also ==
- List of Vikings characters
