= Cultural depictions of Alfred the Great =

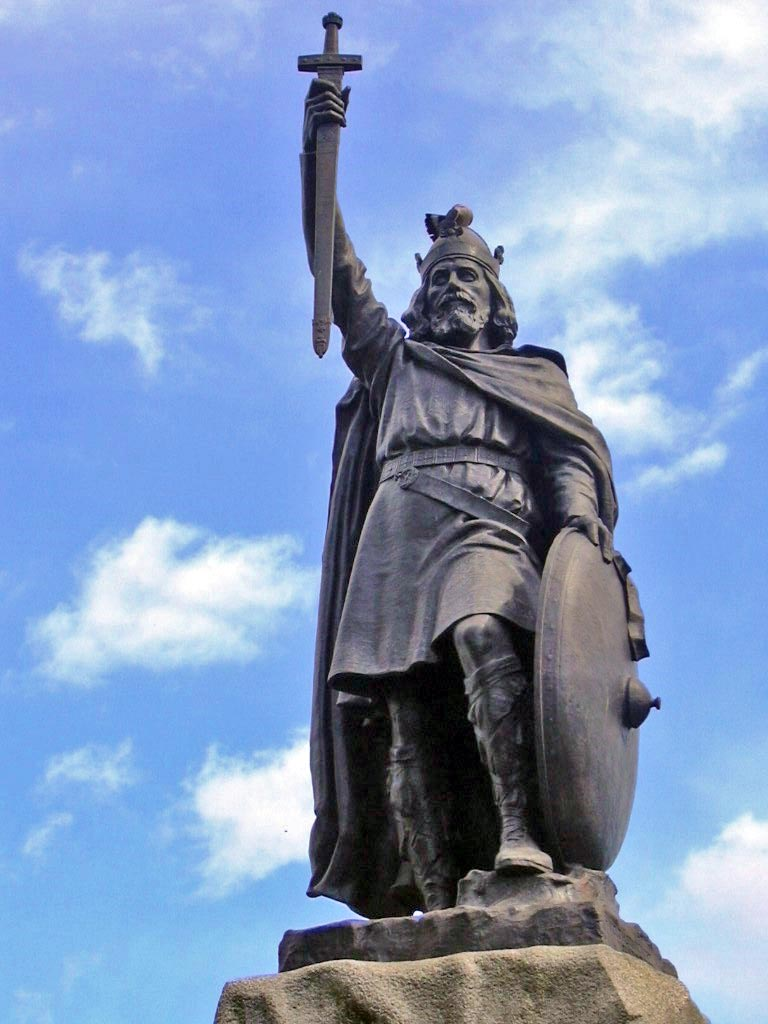
Statue of Alfred the Great by Hamo Thornycroft in Winchester, unveiled during the millennial commemoration of Alfred's death. During which Lord Rosebery commented that the statue can only be an effigy of the imagination, and so the Alfred we reverence may well be an idealised figure ... we have draped round his form ... all the highest attributes of manhood and kingship.

Alfred the Great was an Anglo-Saxon king (871–899) of Wessex, an Anglo-Saxon kingdom that existed from 519 to 927 south of the river Thames in England. In the late 9th century, the Vikings had overrun most of the Anglo-Saxon kingdoms that constituted England at the time. Alfred's reign has become regarded as pivotal in the eventual unification of England, after he famously defended Wessex and Southern England against the Viking invasions, winning a decisive victory at the Battle of Edington in 878.

Most of what we know about the historical Alfred comes from his biography Life of King Alfred, written by a Welsh monk Asser, under Alfred's own direction during his reign in 893. This is the earliest biography of an English ruler. It was not until the English Reformation in the 16th century, that Alfred was first given the epithet "the Great", when he was regarded as the ideal Christian sovereign. Over 600 years after his life, Alfred began to inspire many artistic and cultural works, with a height in the Victorian period, when the cult of Alfred developed into a significant cultural force in literature, the visual arts, and national consciousness. The lists and images on this page cover depictions or references to Alfred in a wide range of media, including works of art, literature, histories and plays (mostly favourably or heroically); plus educational establishments named in his honour. Additionally listed are more recent representations of Alfred in popular culture, including film, television, modern historical fiction and video games.

== Background to Alfred's growing reputation ==
Alfred was the youngest son of King Æthelwulf of Wessex. His father died when he was young, and three of Alfred's brothers ruled and died in battle before he acceded to the throne in 871. Alfred spent the first seven years of his reign battling the Viking forces, until as king of Wessex (the last of the Anglo-Saxon kingdoms and half overrun) he decisively defeated the Great Heathen Army at the Battle of Edington in 878. The Vikings then settled in the Danelaw towards the east side of England. Following this, it is recorded that Alfred reorganised national military service, improved Wessex's defence by building a ring of 33 'burhs' (fortified settlements) and designed and built a small fleet of longships, to protect against further Viking threats. From this base, his daughter Æthelflæd Lady of the Mercians and son Edward the Elder began the reconquest of the rest of England from Viking control. As Alfred's reign was pivotal it has often been regarded as the first in the lists of English monarchs.

Alfred gathered advisers from across England, Wales and Francia to his court, including a Welsh monk and scholar named Asser. Alfred's positive image was perhaps overemphasised by Asser, whom Alfred commissioned to write his biography The Life of King Alfred, the first for an English ruler. (The manuscript survives in only one copy, which was part of the Cotton library). Asser portrays his king "as the embodiment of the ideal, but practical, Christian ruler". Alfred's reign is notable for a rebirth of learning: several works were translated from Latin into Old English, with some credited to Alfred himself, works that were considered "most necessary for all men to know"; he made education reforms (including advocacy of education in the English language rather than in Latin) and he established schools to provide education for future priests and secular administrators, so that they might be better in their legal judgements. Alfred issued a new law code and commissioned the Anglo-Saxon Chronicle, a collection of annals in Old English that recorded the historical events in England and was later extended up to 1154.

Asser presents Alfred as saintly; however Alfred was never canonised (in 1441 Henry VI of England attempted unsuccessfully to have him canonised by Pope Eugene IV), so in Catholic medieval England artists turned to the royal Anglo-Saxon saints such as Saint Edmund the Martyr and Saint Edward the Confessor, for inspiration as subjects. (Though venerated at times in the Catholic Church, the current "Roman Martyrology" does not mention Alfred.) While he was not venerated in art, the medieval historians William of Malmesbury, Matthew Paris and Geoffrey of Monmouth further reinforced Alfred's favourable image as a pious Christian ruler.

In the 16th century Alfred became the ideal symbolic champion for the rising English Protestant church during the English Reformation. Alfred had encouraged the use of English rather than Latin in education, and his translations were viewed as untainted by later Roman Catholic influences. Archbishop Matthew Parker published an edition of Asser's Life of Alfred in 1574. It was at this time, over 600 years after his death, that Alfred was first given the epithet "the Great". The designation was maintained by those who admired Alfred's perceived patriotism, his undoubted success against barbarism, promotion of education, and establishment of the rule of law. The comparatively greater amount of written information from his reign, including his law code and Asser's account of Alfred's thoughts on law, education and administration helped. The historical Alfred evolved into the increasingly popular legendary Alfred. He was venerated as a Christian hero, with a feast day or commemoration on 26 October, and he is often found depicted in stained glass in Church of England parish churches. He became the ideal unthreatening example of a ruler when discussing the ideal monarch and the roles of monarchy in a modern state; and 18th century British royals like Frederick, Prince of Wales could draw upon Alfred's popularity in creating their own royal images. The cult of King Alfred the Great increased until by the reign of Victoria, Alfred was perceived as founder of the English nation and an archetypal symbol of the nation's perception of itself. He has been seen as a heroic figure, who centuries after his death inspired many artistic and cultural works. During this period, "Alfred" became a popular Christian name, with Queen Victoria in 1844 naming her second son Prince Alfred. In 1870, Edward Augustus Freeman called Alfred the Great "the most perfect character in history". "Alfredophilia" and "Alfredomania" found expression in religious, legal, political and historical writing; in poetry, drama, music and prose; and in sculpture, painting, engraving and book illustration. In 2002 Alfred was still ranked number 14 in the BBC's poll of the 100 Greatest Britons.

== Art and sculpture ==
There are no surviving images of Alfred from his reign, except on his coins.

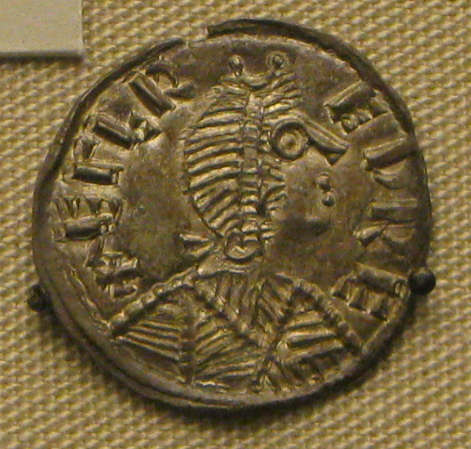
A coin of Alfred, king of Wessex

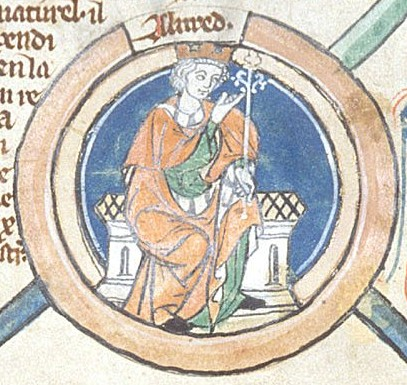
13th century depiction of Alfred the Great

Artistic images of King Alfred began to flourish mainly from 18th to the early 20th century. In 1734–1735 Alfred's bust was included as one of the Whig historical champions in ‘The Temple of British Worthies’, in the English landscape gardens of Stowe House created by William Kent. Representations of Alfred proliferated, with Alfred often depicted as the archetypical symbol of the English nation: as a heroic military commander, a wise scholar and upholder of justice. Those who could not own sculpture or high art could possess a decorative image of 'England's Darling' in the fashionable genre of History painting, amongst which the most common examples were Alfred disguised in the Danish camp and Alfred burning the peasant woman's cakes.

King Alfred's bust at the ‘Temple of British Worthies’ at Stowe House 1734–1735.

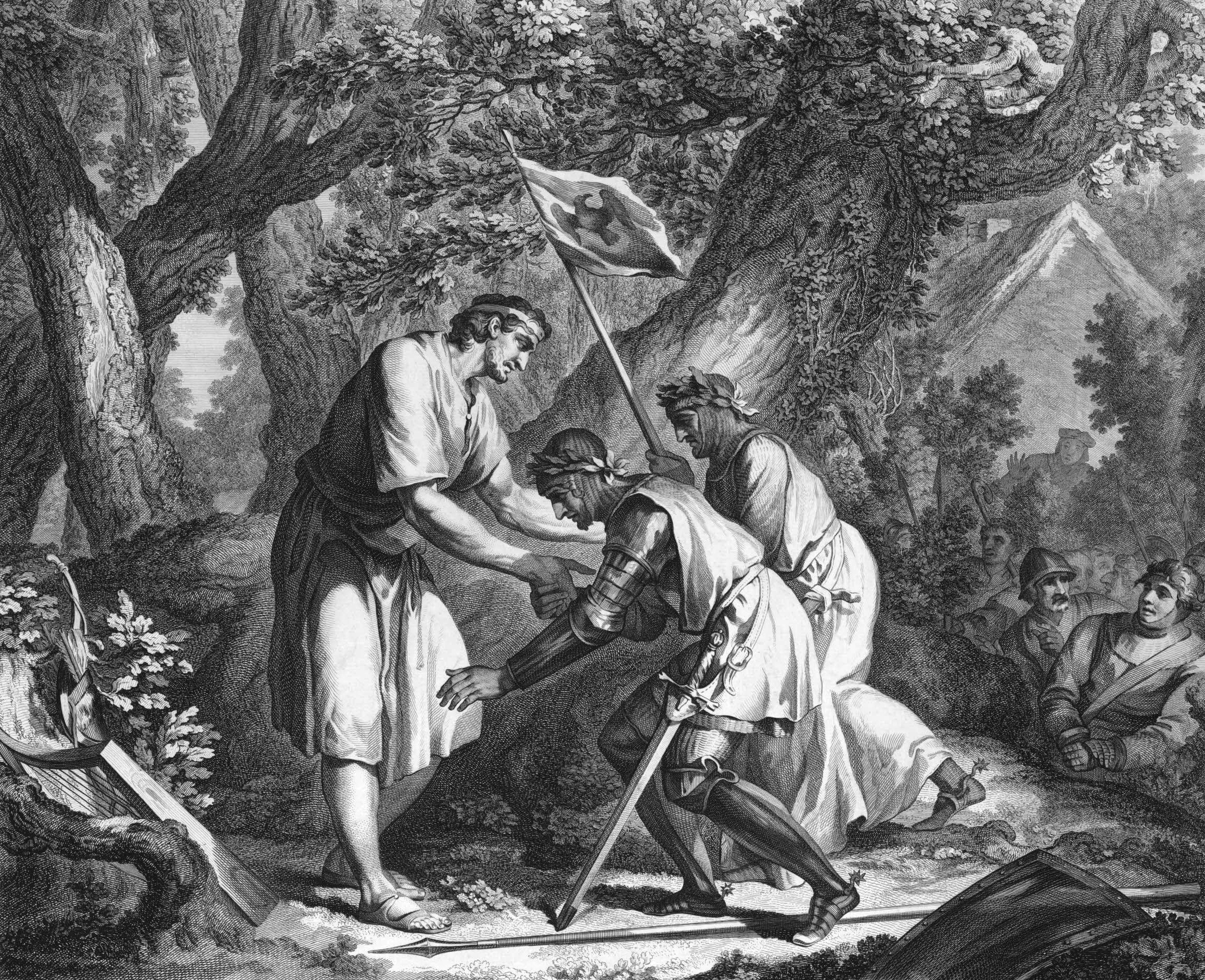
Alfred in the Isle of Athelney, receiving News of a Victory over the Danes (a 1751 print, after Nicholas Blakey).

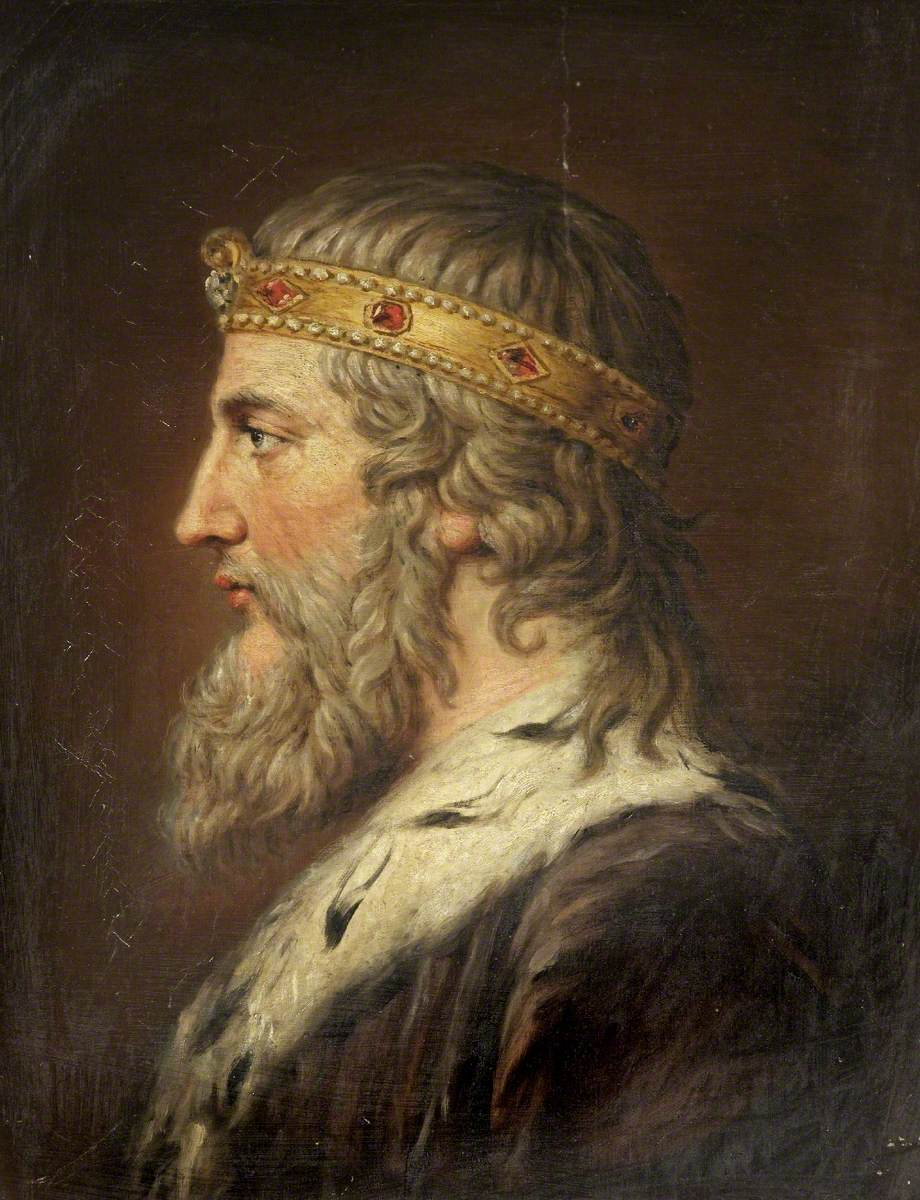
1800–1815 portrait of Alfred attributed to Samuel Woodforde

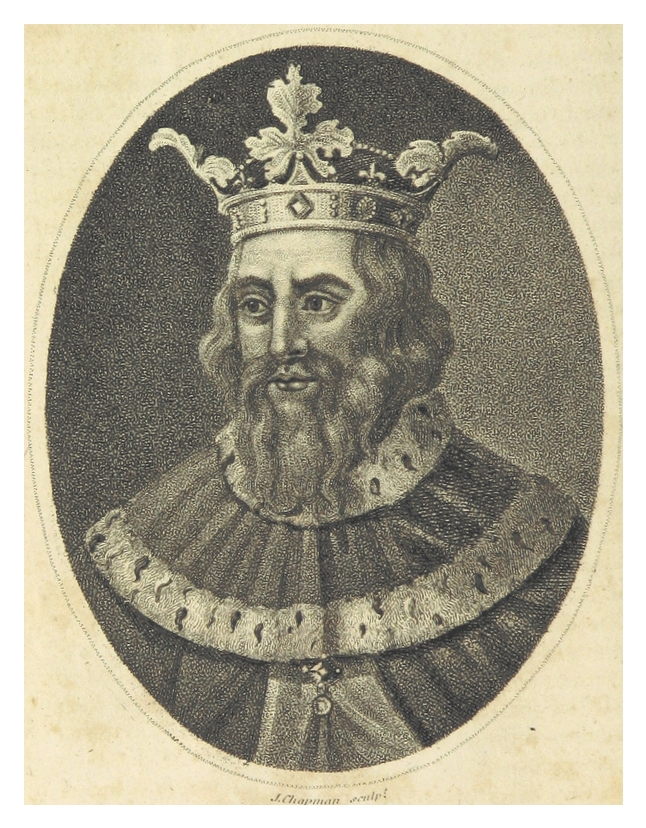
Taken from Thomas Mante's Naval and Military History of the Wars of England, including those of Scotland and Ireland, (1800) p1.102

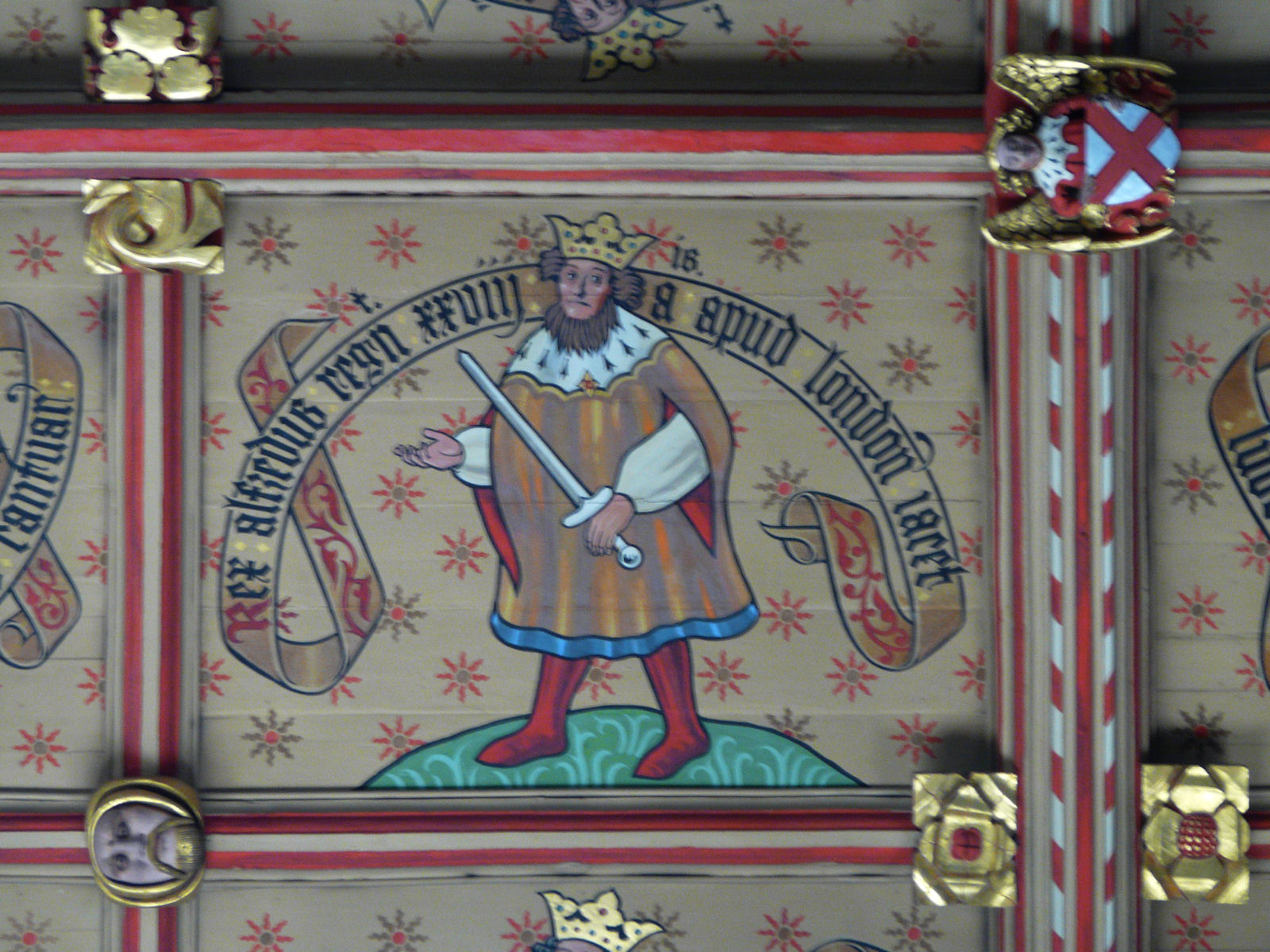
King Alfred painted vault over the choir area in St. Mary's Church, Beverley, East Riding of Yorkshire, England.

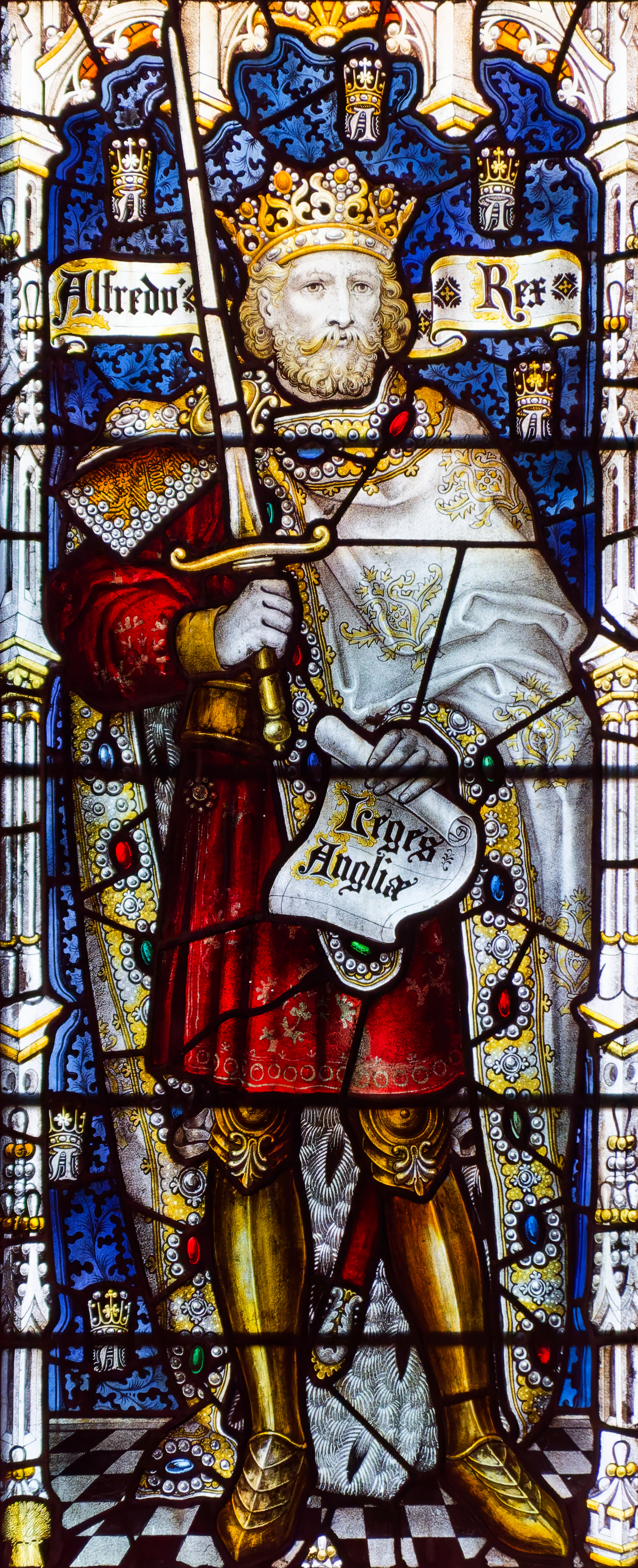
King Alfred the Great pictured in a stained glass window in the West Window of the south transept of Bristol Cathedral, by Charles Eamer Kempe

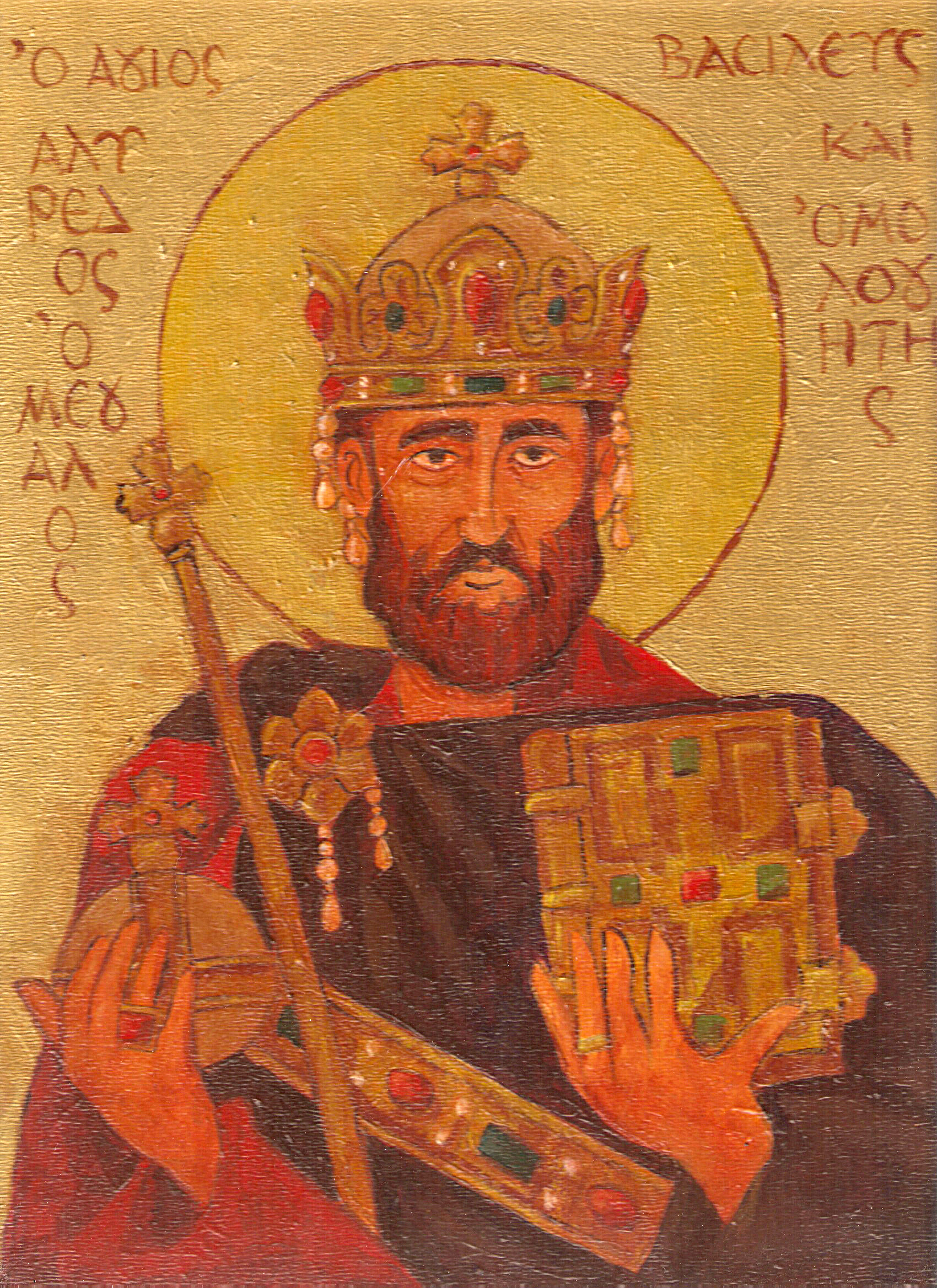
Eastern Orthodox Ikon of King St. Alfred the Great

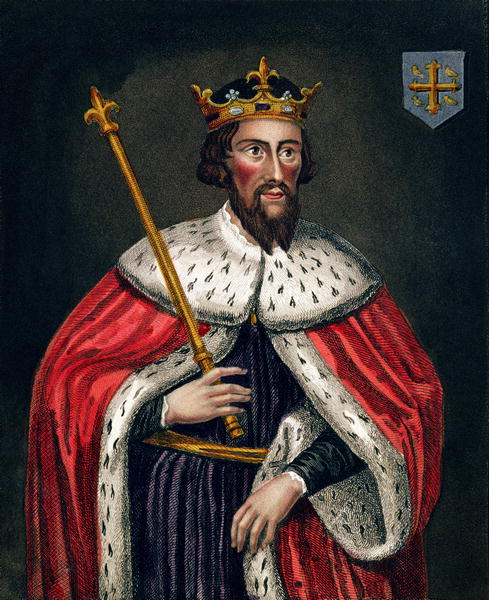
19th century painting of King Alfred (The Great)

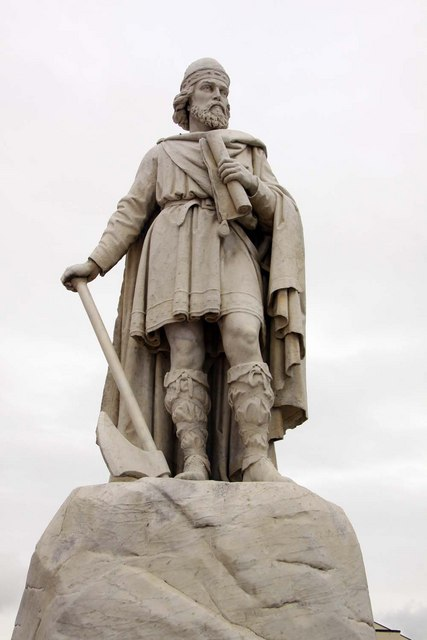
Statue of Alfred the Great at Wantage, Berkshire, 1877.

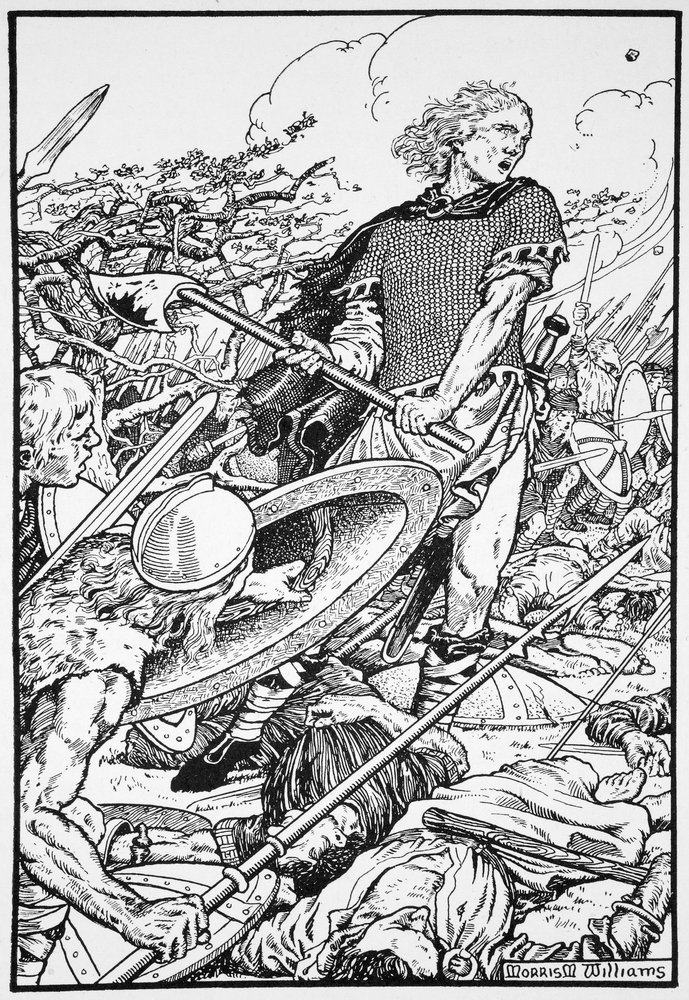
Alfred the Great at the Battle of Ashdown by Morris Meredith Williams (1913)

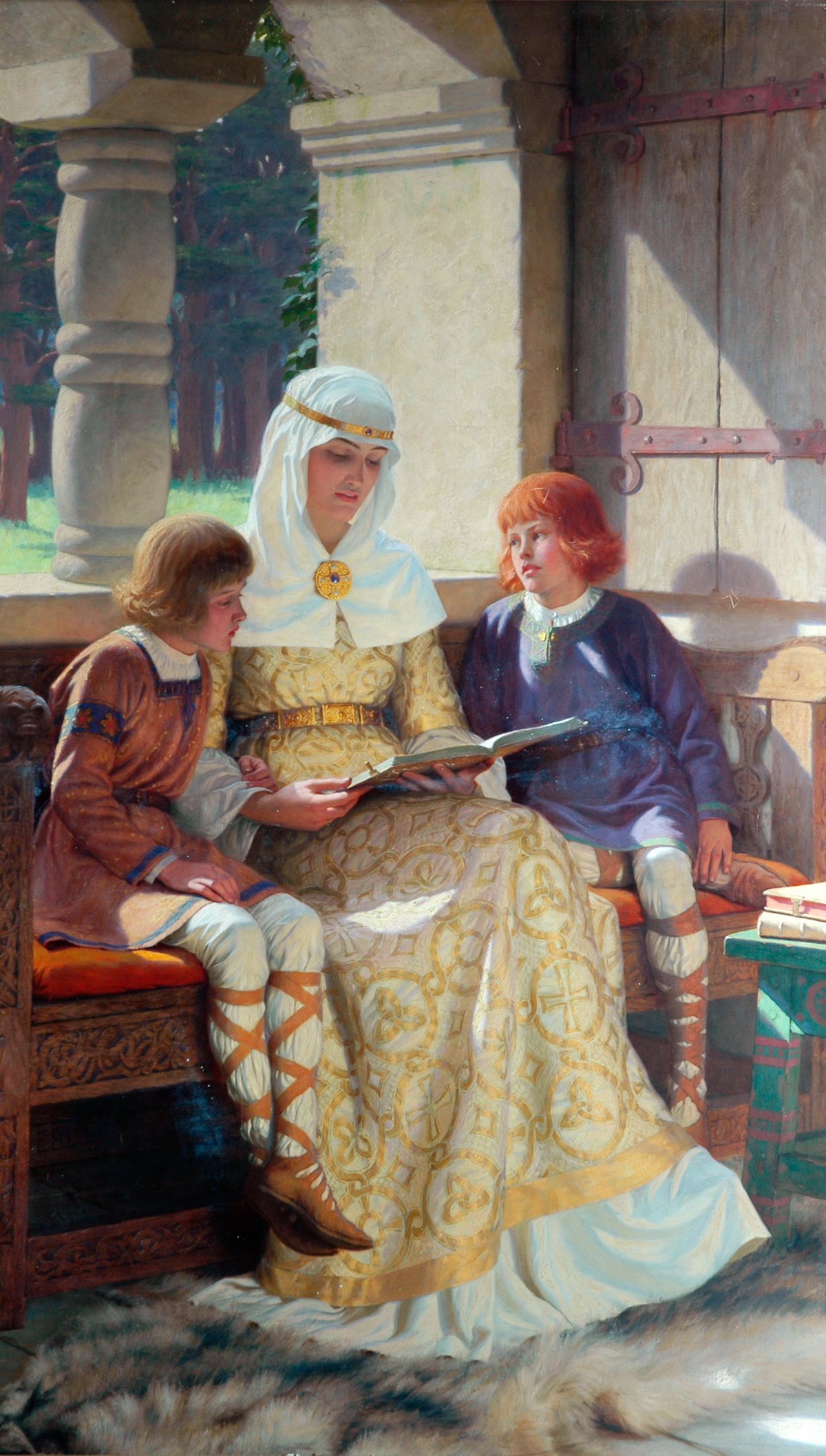
The Boyhood of Alfred the Great (1913)

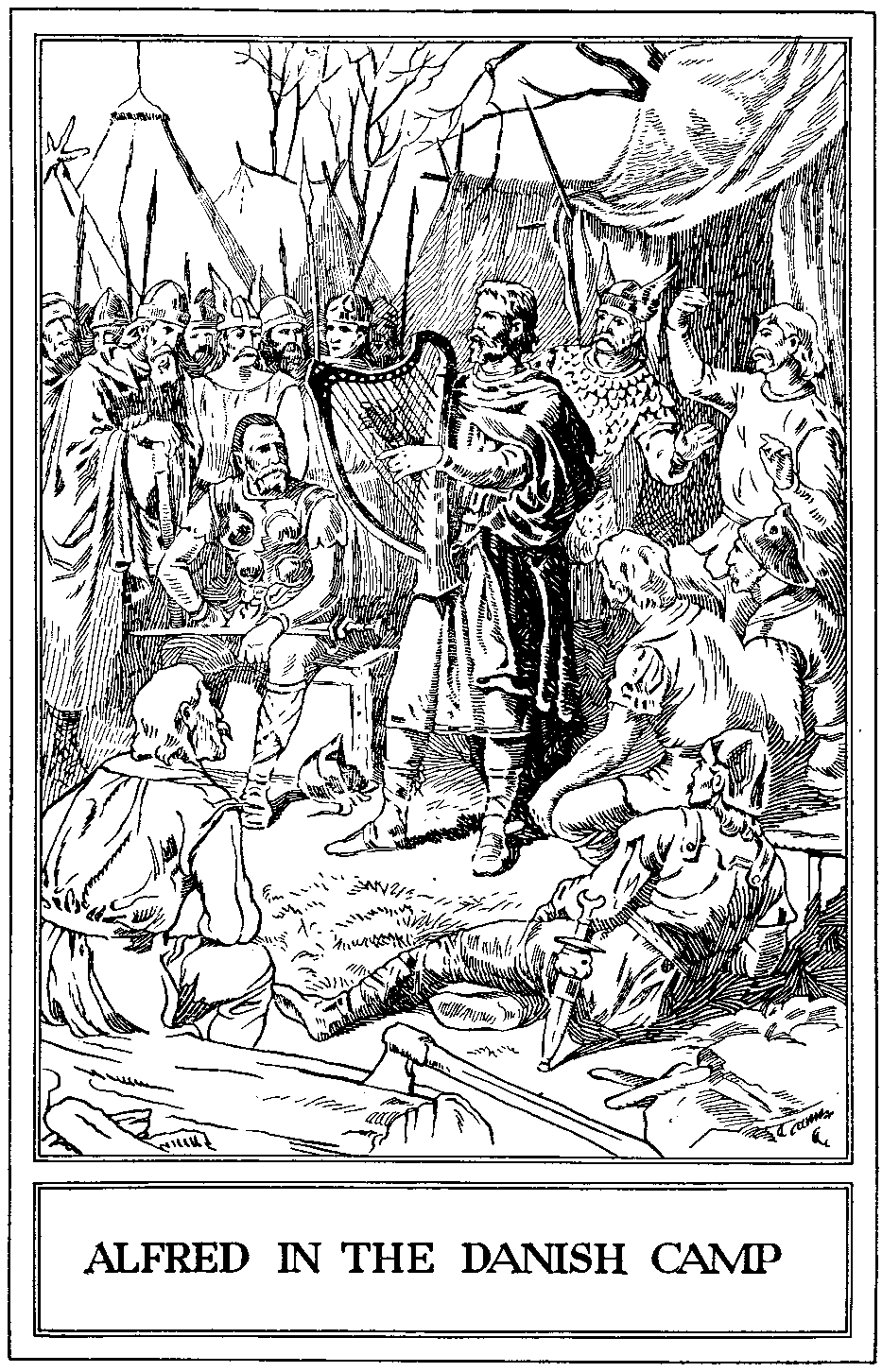
1904, Alfred the great in the Danish invaders camp

== Historical writing ==
Alfred is the subject of several historical works. Early examples include:

Date	Title	Author	Refs.
(1570 edition)	Foxe's Book of Martyrs	John Foxe	
(1634)	Life of Alfred	Robert Powell	
(1642)	Life of King Alfred	Sir John Spelman	

== Literature ==
Alfred is the subject of several works of historical fiction. These include:

Date	Title	Author	Notes
1723	Alfred	Sir Richard Blackmore	An Epick Poem in Twelve Books. Dedicated to Prince Frederick, the eldest son of King George II. The poem was ostensibly about King Alfred the Great, but like Blackmore's earlier Arthurian epics, it was also a means to express his partisan view of the political events of his time.
1801	Alfred	Henry James Pye	epic poem
1801	Alfred	Joseph Cottle	epic poem
1808–1834	King Alfred	John Fitchett (poet)	An epic poem, Fitchett spent forty years researching and writing it. It was printed at Warrington for private circulation, in five quarto volumes. It was cast in the form of a romantic, based on the life and times of King Alfred. Fitchett did not live to finish the work, which was completed by his friend Robert Roscoe who added the final 2,585 lines to the poem. The entire work contains more than 130,000 lines.
1830	Sea-Kings in England: an historical romance of the time of Alfred	Edwin Atherstone	A historical romance novel set during king Alfred's war against the Viking invasions
1861	A Chronicle of Ethelfled	Anne Manning	Focusing on the relationship between Alfred and his daughter Æthelflæd.
1886	The Dragon and the Raven, or The Days of King Alfred	G. A. Henty	Drawing on his experience as a war correspondent Henty gives vivid picture of the horrors of the Danish invasions. The story of young Edmund, who joins Alfred's struggle against the hordes of marauding invaders. "Impeccably researched and extremely fast-paced".
1901	The King's Sons: A Story of King Alfred's Boyhood	G. Manville Fenn	A children's novel.
1911	The Ballad of the White Horse	G. K. Chesterton	Written in ballad form, the work has been described as one of the last great traditional epic poems written in the English language, it depicts Alfred as a divinely oriented leader waging holy war, uniting the Kingdoms of Britain against the Vikings. The poem is about the idealised exploits of Alfred the Great and how he was victorious over the invading Danes following a vision of the Virgin Mary.
1943	The King Liveth	Jeffrey Farnol	
1961	The King of Athelney	Alfred Duggan	A historical novel biography with a mixture of uncontested facts, as well as some stories of less authenticity, such as the burning of the cakes.
1964	The Namesake	C. Walter Hodges	Children's historical novel in which King Alfred is an important character.
1967	The Marsh King	C. Walter Hodges	Children's historical novel
1990	The Edge of Light	Joan Wolf	Historical novel about the life and times of Alfred the Great
1993	The Hammer and the Cross	Harry Harrison and John Holm (a pseudonym of Tom Shippey)	An alternative history science fiction novel, the first in a trilogy.
2004	The Last Light of the Sun	Guy Gavriel Kay	Historical fantasy novel Alfred is thinly disguised under the name King Aeldred
2004–2020	The Saxon Stories	Bernard Cornwell	A series of 12 historical novels in which Alfred is portrayed as a pious and physically weak individual. Although unassuming, he is possessed of an iron will and, ultimately, becomes a significant barrier to Viking ambitions simply by being alive. Later adapted for television as The Last Kingdom.
2008	Warrior King	Sue Purkiss	A children's novel.
2013	The Late Scholar	Jill Paton Walsh	The book is set in Oxford University in the 1950s. The plot concerns a manuscript attributed to King Alfred, and he is discussed by the characters.

== Theatre, operas and other vocal works ==
Alfred is the subject of several works of historical drama. These include:

Date	Title	Composer/Writer	Genre	Notes
1740–1753	Alfred	Music by Thomas Arne; libretto by David Mallet and James Thomson	A masque/Opera	This work was first performed on 1 August 1740, at Cliveden, country home of Frederick, Prince of Wales, as a celebration of the anniversary of his grandfather King George I's royal accession to the throne of Great Britain. From it the patriotic anthem "Rule, Britannia!" originates. During the French Wars (1793-1815), patriotic plays, opera and ballets about Alfred became popular often concluding with a rousing rendition of the Thompson's and Arne's ‘Rule Britannia’, as the new anthem became a favoured way to express allegiance to the sovereign.
1827	Alfred the Great; or, the Enchanted Standard	Isaac Pocock	Light operatic comedy	A musical drama, in two acts
1829	Alfred the Great	Sarah Hamilton	A drama in five acts	
1837	Alfred the Great; or The Patriot King	James Sheridan Knowles	Drama	

== Depictions on screen ==
Depictions on film and television screen include:

Date	Title	Format	Notes	Ref
1969	Alfred the Great	epic film	Directed by Clive Donner, with David Hemmings playing Alfred, the film received negative reviews and was not a commercial success.	
1971	The Raven and the Cross	A UK children's BBC television (TV) serial	by John A. Tully, about Alfred's conflict with Guthrum.	
1974	King Alfred	episode 4 of BBC's Churchill's People	Alfred is played by Alan Howard.	
2009 and 2015	Horrible Histories and their rebooted series	A UK CBBC Children's TV series	In this light hearted children's educational history sketch series Alfred is portrayed in various episodes by Mathew Baynton/Tom Rosenthal	
2015 -2018	The Last Kingdom	A BBC America, and on BBC Two television series adaptation of The Saxon Stories	Alfred is played by David Dawson for the first three seasons of the series.	
2015–2020	Vikings	History (Canadian TV network) series	From season 3 to 4, Alfred is portrayed by various actors throughout his childhood and in seasons 5 and 6 by Ferdia Walsh-Peelo as an adult; however, he is depicted as the bastard son of Athelstan by Aethelwulf's wife Judith (based on Judith of Flanders), but is nonetheless raised as Aethelwulf's legitimate son.	

== Video games ==
Alfred is the faction leader for Wessex in the 2018 strategy game Total War Saga: Thrones of Britannia.

In the 2020 action role-playing game Assassin's Creed Valhalla, Alfred is leading the Kingdom of Wessex against the Vikings and acts as the main overarching antagonist. At the end of the story, Alfred is revealed to be the Grand Master of the Order of the Ancients, the secretive organization driving the game's events from behind the scenes, as well as the mysterious character known as the "Poor Fellow-Soldier of Christ", who helped the protagonist, Eivor, eliminate the Order by sending her anonymous letters with the whereabouts of certain Order members. When Eivor confronts Alfred, he reveals that he inherited the title of Grand Master along with the crown from his older brother Æthelred, but disagreed with the Order's beliefs, especially their heresy against Christianity, and so sought to purge it so that a new "universal order" may take its place. Alfred's actions would eventually give rise to the Templar Order over two centuries later, which is a continuation of the Order of the Ancients that more closely follows Alfred's beliefs.

Alfred appears in the second and third instalments of the Crusader Kings series of grand strategy games by Paradox Interactive. In both titles, he begins as an ealdorman under his brother Æthelred and has not yet become King of Wessex.

== Education ==
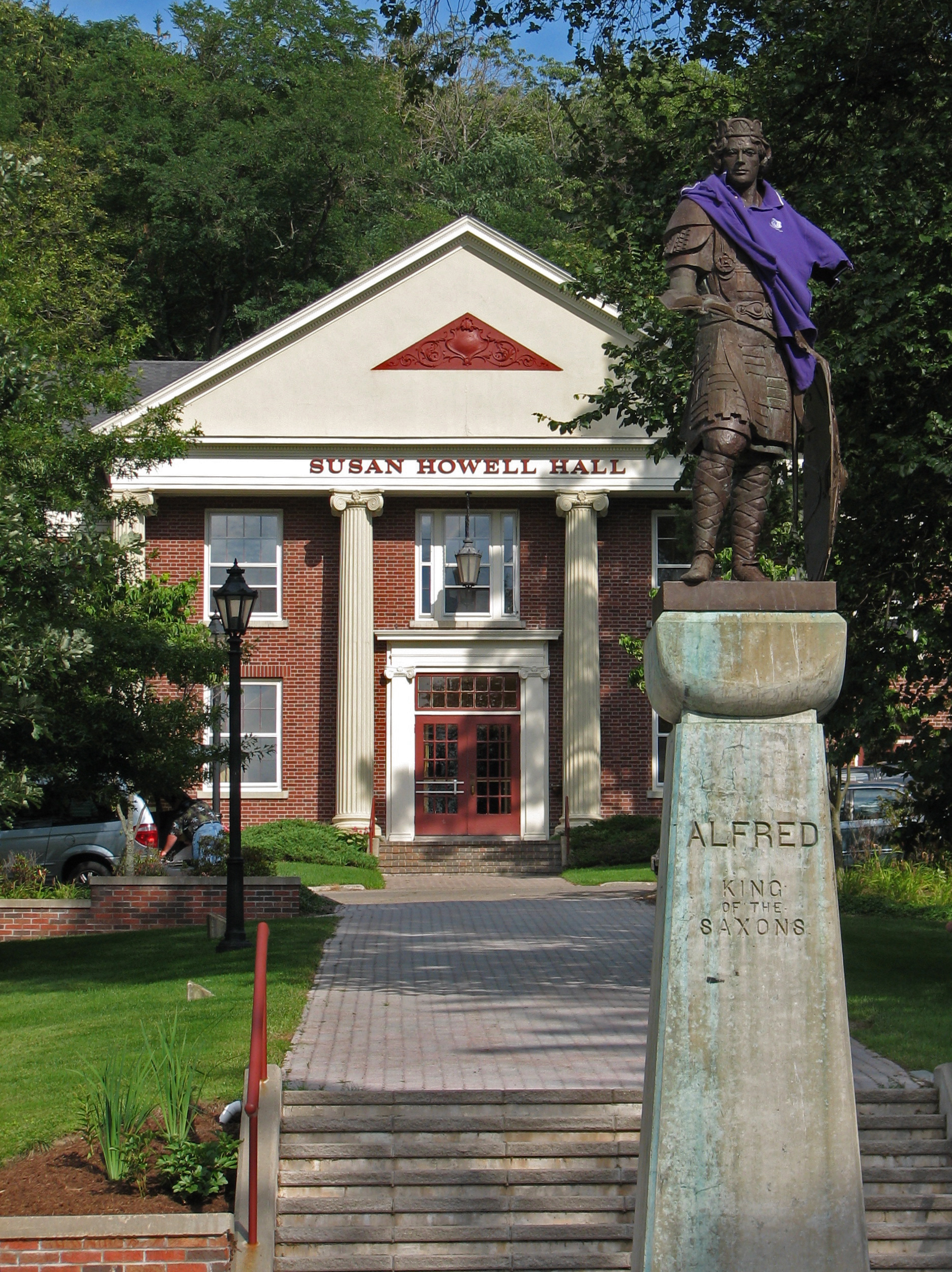
Statue of King Alfred at Alfred University

A number of educational establishments are named in Alfred's honour:

- The University of Winchester created from the former King Alfred's College, Winchester (1928 to 2004)
- Alfred University and Alfred State College in Alfred, New York; the local telephone exchange for Alfred University is 871 in commemoration of Alfred's ascension to the throne.
- The University of Liverpool created a King Alfred Chair of English Literature
- King Alfred's Academy, a secondary school in Wantage, Oxfordshire, the birthplace of Alfred
- King's Lodge School in Chippenham, Wiltshire, so named because King Alfred's hunting lodge is reputed to have stood on or near the site of the school
- The King Alfred School and Specialist Sports Academy, Burnham Road, Highbridge, so named due to its rough proximity to Brent Knoll (a Beacon site) and Athelney
- The King Alfred School in Barnet, North London, UK
- King Alfred's house in Bishop Stopford's School at Enfield

== Military ==
The Royal Navy has named one ship and two shore establishments HMS King Alfred, and one of the first ships of the US Navy was named USS Alfred in his honour.
