= Nathan O'Toole =

Irish actor

- Born: 17 March 1998 (age 28)
- Occupation: Actor
- Years active: 2012–present

Nathan O'Toole (born 17 March 1998) is an Irish actor. He is known for his role as a young Bjorn Ironside in the first, second and third seasons of the History series Vikings. O'Toole made his television debut at 13 in the Showtime series The Borgias as Vincenzo.

== Early life ==
O'Toole grew up in Dunshaughlin, County Meath with three siblings. He attended St. Seachnall National School and then Dunshaughlin Community College. He began taking acting classes with Ann Kavanagh's Young People's Theatre when he was 10. He then went on to train at Bow Street Academy in Dublin.

== Filmography ==
Year	Series	Role	Notes
2012	The Borgias	Vincenzo	2 episodes
2013–2014; 2016	Vikings	Björn Ironside	11 episodes; Recurring (Season 1); Guest (Seasons 2; 4)
2014	Penny Dreadful	Ernest	Episode: "Resurrection"
2017	Clondorca	Brian	Short film
2018	The Delinquent Season	Teen 2	
2018	Bernard Dunne's Mythical Heroes	Various	
2021	Der Irland-Krimi	Michael O'Connor	Episode: "Vergebung"
