= Brian Wood (British Army soldier) =

British soldier

Brian Wood MC
- Born: 8 November 1980 (age 45)
- Military career
- Allegiance: British Army
- Rank: Colour sergeant
- Unit: Princess of Wales' Royal Regiment
- Conflicts: Iraq War: Battle of Danny Boy; Afghanistan War
- Awards: Military Cross
- Website: https://www.brianwoodmc.co.uk/

Brian Wood MC (born 8 November 1980) is a former soldier in the Princess of Wales's Royal Regiment who was awarded the Military Cross for gallantry in the Battle of Danny Boy.

== Military service ==
Wood served for 17 years in the British Army with the Princess of Wales's Royal Regiment. During his service in Iraq, he led the first bayonet charge in 25 years. For his gallantry in leading the bayonet charge in the Battle of Danny Boy, and taking control of the situation during the ambush of his unit, he was awarded the Military Cross.

== Falsified allegations of war crime ==
After coming back from Iraq in 2004, Wood was informed that there were allegations against himself and his regiment from the Iraq Historic Abuse Team.

At the end of the Al-Sweady Inquiry, which Wood was a part of, Sir Thayne Forbes said that some of the claims against him and his regiment (and the others serving in the Battle of Danny Boy) had been "the product of deliberate lies".

Phil Shiner of the IHAT legal team was struck off the roll of solicitors in the United Kingdom due to misconduct during the trial and falsification of certain cases.

== Writing ==
In 2019, Wood published his book Double Crossed: A Code of Honour, A Complete Betrayal in hardback; the book described his service in Iraq, the receiving of his gallantry medal and his involvement with the Al-Sweady Inquiry. On 5 March 2020, the book was published as a paperback version.

== Media ==
On 3 February 2017, Wood appeared on ITV's Good Morning Britain talking about the false allegations against him and his unit by disgraced lawyer Phil Shiner.

In 2021, BBC Two broadcast the drama Danny Boy. The film details Wood's alleged war crimes in Iraq, and follows his fight for the truth. The film stars Anthony Boyle as Wood, and Toby Jones as human rights lawyer Phil Shiner.

== Medals ==
Wood has received the following medals:

Military Cross (MC)
NATO Medal for Kosovo
Iraq Medal
OSM For Afghanistan
Queen Elizabeth II Diamond Jubilee Medal
