= Catherine Moulton =

British writer

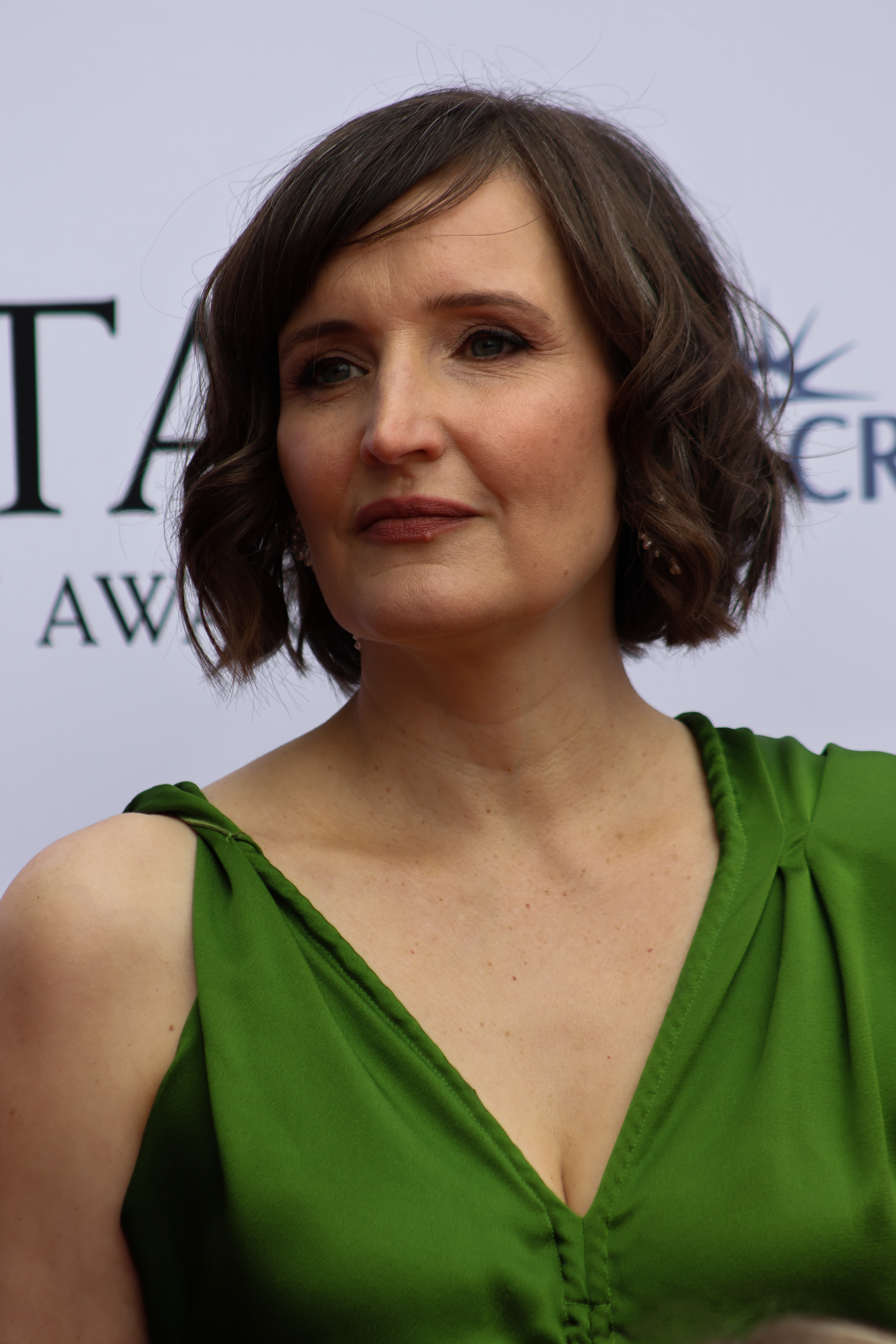
- Moulton in 2026
- Occupations: Television writer, producer
- Known for: Code of Silence

Catherine Moulton is a British television writer and producer. She is best known for creating the series The Stolen Girl and Code of Silence.

== Biography ==
Moulton lives in London, where she works predominantly as a screenwriter. Moulton initially worked in script editing and as a development executive, before moving into writing after completing the 2019 4Screenwriting course and the BBC TV Drama Writers Programme for 2020. Partially deaf since birth she created and wrote the show Code of Silence, which focused on a lip reading woman. She also adapted the novel Playdate by Alex Dahl into the TV thriller series The Stolen Girl.

== Filmography ==
Year	Title	Notes	Broadcaster
2021	Baptiste	Series 2, Episode 5	BBC One
2023	Then You Run	Episode: "Eyes on the Prize"	Sky Max
2023	Hijack	Episode: "Comply Slowly"	Apple TV+
2025	The Stolen Girl	Creator	Disney+
2025	Code of Silence	Creator	ITV
