= Danny Boy (2021 film) =

2021 film directed by Sam Miller

- Written by: Robert Jones
- Directed by: Sam Miller
- Starring: Anthony Boyle; Toby Jones; Alex Ferns; Leah McNamara
- Country of origin: United Kingdom
- Original language: English

Production
- Producer: Simon Lewis
- Production company: Expectation

Original release
- Network: BBC Two
- Release: May 12, 2021

Danny Boy is a 2021 British biographical drama television film directed by Sam Miller. It details parts of the life of war veteran Brian Wood.

The film tells the story of Brian Wood, a medal-winning war veteran who was accused of war crimes in Iraq during the Battle of Danny Boy by the Iraq Historic Allegations Team, and follows his fight for the truth during the Al-Sweady Inquiry. The film stars Anthony Boyle as Brian Wood, Toby Jones as human rights lawyer Phil Shiner, Alex Ferns as Gavin, Brian's father, and Leah McNamara as Brian's wife.

Danny Boy was first broadcast on BBC Two on 12 May 2021.

== Cast ==
- Toby Jones як Phil Shiner
- Anthony Boyle як Brian Wood
- Sarah Niles як Stella Marshall
- Leah McNamara як Lucy Wood
- Alex Ferns як Gavin Wood
- Tom Vaughan-Lawlor як Patrick
- Kiran Sonia Sawar як Deena Aayari
- Emma Lowndes як Sgt Gail Lennox
- Oaklee Pendergast як Young Brian
- Pauline Turner як Margaret Wood
- Nima Taleghani як Mazin
- Emmanuel Imani як Spud Tatawaqa
- Tommy Finnegan як Bailey Wood
- Spike Leighton як Rushforth
- Joel Morris як Falconer
- Layo-Christina Akinlude як Ellen Chambers
- Rachid Sabitri як Hussein
- Paul Blackwell як Police
