= Battle of Danny Boy =

2004 battle of the Iraq War

- Part of the Iraq War
| Date | 14 May 2004 |
| Location | Al Amara, Southern Iraq |
| Result | British victory |

Belligerents
| United Kingdom | Mahdi Army |

Strength
| British Army; Argyll and Sutherland Highlanders; Princess of Wales's Royal Regiment | ~100 |

Casualties and losses
| Some wounded. | 28 confirmed killed. |

The Battle of Danny Boy took place close to the city of Amarah in Southern Iraq on 14 May 2004, between British soldiers and about 100 Iraqi insurgents of the Mahdi Army. The battle is named after a local British checkpoint called Danny Boy.

== Battle ==
The Mahdi Army insurgents ambushed a patrol of Argyll and Sutherland Highlanders close to a checkpoint known as Danny Boy near Majar al-Kabir. The Argylls called in reinforcements from the 1st Battalion of the Princess of Wales's Royal Regiment; the latter were also ambushed, and due to an electronic communications failure it was some time before further British relief arrived.

While waiting for reinforcements, the British were involved in one of the fiercest engagements they fought in Iraq. The fighting involved close-quarter rifle fire and bayonets. The battle lasted for about three hours, during which 28 Mahdi Army insurgents were killed; the British suffered some wounded, but none were killed in the action.

== Aftermath ==
Sergeant Brian Wood, of the Princess of Wales's Royal Regiment was awarded the Military Cross for his part in the battle.

On 25 November 2009, Bob Ainsworth, then the British Minister of State for the Armed Forces, announced that retired High Court judge Sir Thayne Forbes would chair the Al-Sweady Inquiry. It was alleged that 20 Iraqis, taken prisoner during the battle, were murdered and that others were tortured. The British Ministry of Defence denied that the 20 were captured, stating that 20 bodies were removed from the battlefield for identification and then returned to their families; a further nine were taken prisoner and held for questioning but were not mistreated.

In March 2013, Christopher Stanley of the UK-based Rights Watch group said that MoD was trying to get away with grave human rights violations – including killing – without punishment or due process of law. On 4 March 2013, the hearings of the Al-Sweady Public Inquiry opened in London. On 20 March 2014, Public Interest Lawyers, a British law firm acting for the families of the dead Iraqis, announced that they were withdrawing the allegations against British soldiers. They accepted that there was no evidence that the Iraqis had been alive when taken into the British compound.

On 17 December 2014, the inquiry, which cost nearly £25 million, returned its findings. It found that no prisoners had been murdered, nor that their bodies had been mutilated, and that the evidence to that effect from the detainees was deliberately untruthful. However, the inquiry did find that British soldiers mistreated nine Iraqi prisoners, but not deliberately. It stated that the ill-treatment was much milder than the initial accusations of torture, mutilation and murder. Sir Thayne said that the "most serious allegations" which "have been hanging over [the British] soldiers for the past 10 years" have been found to be "without foundation".

The inquiry found that the allegations made by the Iraqis and their lawyers were based on "deliberate lies, reckless speculation and ingrained hostility". As a result of the inquiry's findings, Public Interest Lawyers and Leigh Day, another firm involved in cases against British troops, were referred to the Solicitors Regulatory Authority.

In August 2016, Public Interest Lawyers went out of business, while the British government announced it would take steps to prevent further spurious claims against troops. In December 2016, Professor Phil Shiner, head of Public Interest Lawyers, admitted guilt in relation to claims of wrongdoing by British troops in the context of professional misconduct proceedings. He was struck off the roll of solicitors by the Solicitors Disciplinary Tribunal in February 2017.

== In film and TV ==
The battle and its aftermath are depicted in the 2021 BBC Two drama Danny Boy, starring Anthony Boyle and Toby Jones.
