= Zoran Drvenkar =

German / Croatian writer

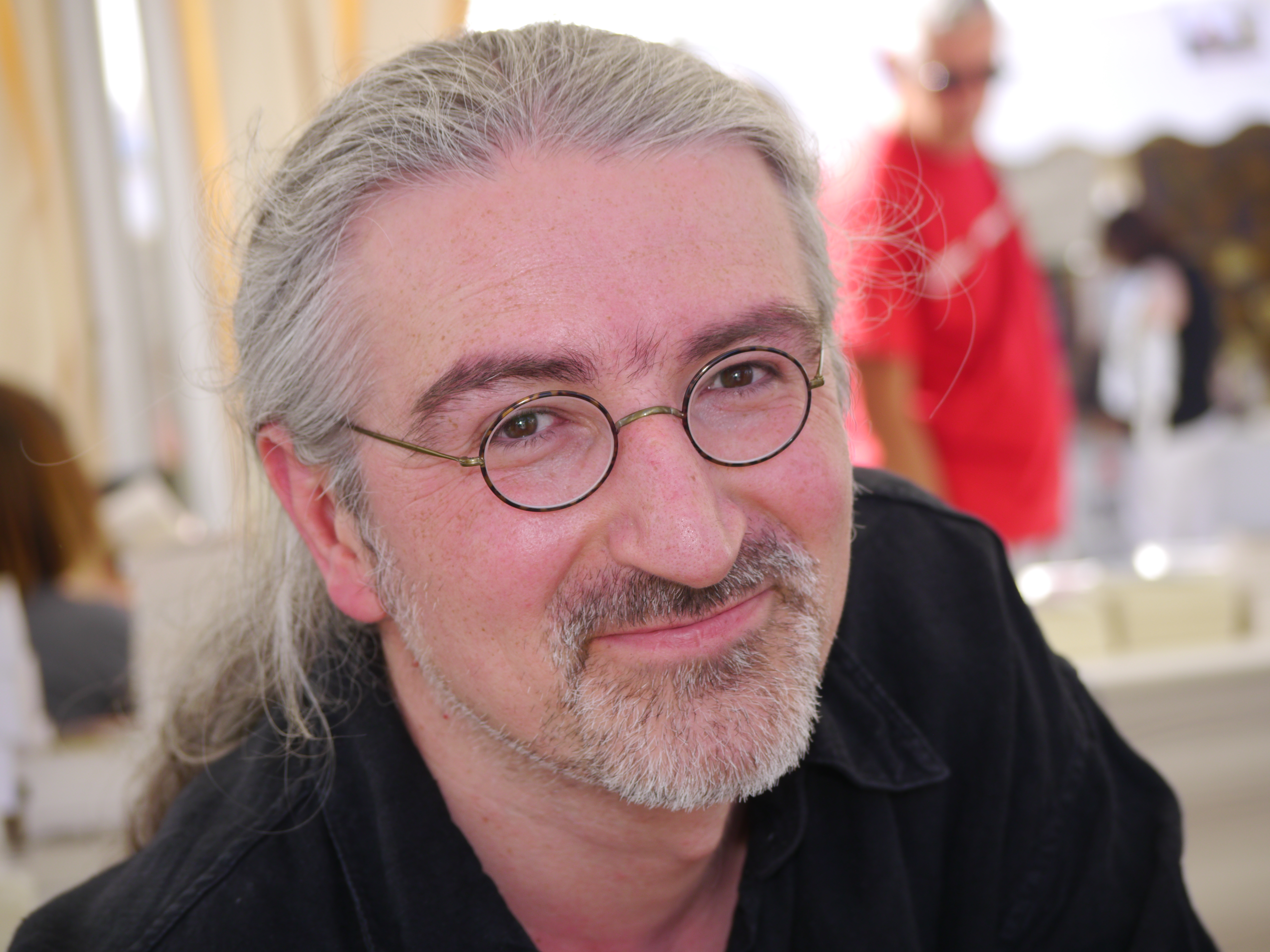
Drvenkar in 2011

Zoran Drvenkar (born 1967) is a Croatian / German writer. He has written fiction, poems, and plays. His 2014 crime thriller novel You was adapted into a TV series, Then You Run, in 2023.

== Early life ==
Born in Križevci, Croatia in 1967, Zoran Drvenkar has lived in Germany since age three.

== Career ==
Drvenkar has worked as a writer from 1989. He has written novels, including fiction for children and young adults, poems, plays, and short stories.

A novel for young adults, Tell Me What You See, was published in an English translation by Chantal Wright in 2005.

His thriller novel Sorry won the Friedrich-Glauser Prize in 2010. Employing a complex multi-person narrative scheme, the English translation has been critically acclaimed.

The English translation of the crime thriller You was published in 2014. In February 2020, it was announced that Sky had commissioned an eight-part TV adaptation of You, penned by Ben Chanan. The series, called Then You Run, was released on Sky Max in the UK from 7 July 2023.

== Recognition and awards ==
Drvenkar has received many grants and prizes for his writing, including:

- 1998: Oldenburg Children's and Young People's Book Prize, for his debut novel Niemand so stark wie wir
- 1999: Science Fiction Prize of the Literature Workshop Berlin for Die alte Stadt
- 2000: Munich Youth Dramatist Prize
- 2005: German Young People's Literature Prize, for Die Kurzhosengang (2004), published under the dual pseudonyms of "Victor Caspak & Yves Lanois"
