= Leah McNamara =

Irish actress

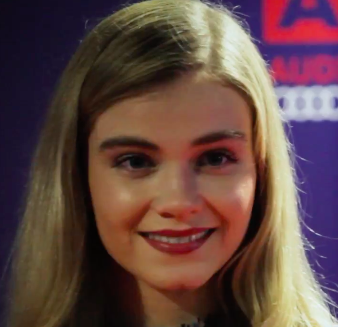
- McNamara at the 2017 Dublin International Film Festival
- Born: Castletroy, Limerick, Ireland
- Education: University College Cork; Bow Street Academy
- Occupation: Actress
- Years active: 2010–present

Leah McNamara is an Irish actress. She starred in the film Metal Heart (2018) and the Sky Max thriller Then You Run (2023). She also appeared in the History series Vikings (2017–2019), the BBC One–RTÉ crime drama Dublin Murders (2019), and the BBC Three–Hulu miniseries Normal People (2020).

== Early life and education ==
McNamara is from Castletroy, a suburb of Limerick. Her uncle is opera singer Paul McNamara.

McNamara attended Castletroy College. She went on to study Drama and Theatre at University College Cork and train at Bow Street Academy.

== Filmography ==
=== Film ===
Year	Title	Role	Notes
2015	Cherry Tree	Caroline St. John	
2016	Lily	Violet	Short film
2017	Nails	Gemma Milgrom	
2018	Cellar Door	Flo	
2018	Metal Heart	Chantal	
2021	Danny Boy	Lucy Wood	
2024	Hellboy: The Crooked Man	Effie Kolb	

=== Television ===
Year	Title	Role	Notes
2010	Jack Taylor	Waitress	Episode: "Purgatory"
2017–2019	Vikings	Aud	Recurring role; 12 episodes
2019	Dublin Murders	Rosalind Devlin	Main role
2020	Normal People	Rachel	Recurring role
2023	Then You Run	Tara	Main role
2024	The Gentlemen	Kellie Ann Ward	Recurring role
