= IHAT =

IHAT is a four-letter acronym that may refer to:

- Ice Hockey Association of Thailand, the governing body of ice hockey in Thailand
- Iraq Historic Allegations Team, a British government organization investigate allegations of abuse and torture by the British Armed Forces in Iraq
