= Martyn Day (lawyer) =

British lawyer

- Education: Warwick University
- Occupation: Solicitor
- Employer: Leigh Day
- Known for: International law, environmental law, and product liability claims

Martyn Day is a British solicitor specializing in international, environmental and product liability claims who founded – and is the Senior Partner of – the law firm Leigh Day, established in 1987. He was a director of Greenpeace Environmental Trust, having stepped down as chairman of Greenpeace UK in 2008.

Examples of his work include negotiating settlements for approximately 1,300 Kenyans injured or killed by leftover British military munitions, for 52 Colombian farmers in a claim against BP relating to the damage caused to farms in the north of the country, and representing Iraqis alleging torture in British custody.

He is the co-author of Toxic Torts, Personal Injury Handbook, Multi-Party Actions and Environmental Action: A Citizen's Guide.

== Family and early career ==
Day took his law degree at Warwick University. He qualified with Colombotti & Partners in 1981 before practising at Clifford & Co. and subsequently Bindman & Partners.

== Leigh Day ==
Leigh Day was established in 1987 by Day and Sarah Leigh. The firm's ethos is "to ensure that the ordinary person has just as good quality legal advice as our state bodies, insurers, and multi-nationals."

One of the UK's most prominent human rights lawyers, Day and his firm have been described by The Guardian newspaper as the "scourge of the corporations". He specialises in group claims, securing damages in cases including a group of Sellafield nuclear workers suffering from leukaemia and in Japanese prisoner of war cases. He has also won damages claims for Colombian farmers against BP and represented four of the six men injured in the trials following the 2006 Northwick Park drug tests.

== Notable cases ==
=== Kenyans killed by unexploded munitions ===
Prior to Kenyan independence, British soldiers had been carrying out military exercises in eastern Kenya since 1945. In 2001, the pastoral communities in the areas where the British held the exercises claimed that their people were being maimed and killed by unexploded ordnance left behind by the British.

The UK Ministry of Defence maintains that it has always been for the Kenyan authorities to clear unexploded devices, although it assisted in the operation, and was unaware that the Kenyans were failing to make the area safe. While not accepting full liability for the 228 victims on the grounds that other armies also use the same firing ranges in Archers Post and Dol Dol, the MoD agreed to pay the compensation.

=== Colombian Farmers v. BP ===
In July 2006, a group of Colombian farmers won a multimillion-pound settlement from BP after the British oil and gas company was accused of benefiting from a regime of terror carried out by Colombian government paramilitaries to protect a 450-mile (720 km) pipeline.

BP denied that it "owed any relevant duty of care" to the claimants, stating that it "did not design, construct or operate the pipeline" and was "at no stage responsible for its maintenance." The company refutes liability for long-term environmental damage, blaming deforestation and cattle grazing for soil erosion and dismissing claims of widespread environmental damage as “significantly inflated."

Marta Hinestroza, a local lawyer who was granted political asylum in the UK after being told that her name had appeared on a paramilitary hitlist, first brought the case to the attention of Leigh Day, who negotiated an out-of-court settlement for a separate group of farmers in 2006.

In June 2006, BP and the farmers met for mediation in Bogotá. On 22 July 2006, the parties announced that a settlement had been reached. The parties did not disclose the terms and amounts paid. However, in a joint statement they did announce that BP, without admitting liability, had agreed to establish an Environmental and Social Improvement Trust Fund for the benefit of the farmers, together with a programme of workshops dealing with environmental management and business development. According to press reports, the amount paid by BP was not thought to be as high as the £15 million originally claimed but was believed to run to several million pounds.

=== Trafigura toxic waste dump ===
The 2006 Côte d'Ivoire toxic waste dump was a health crisis in Côte d'Ivoire in which a ship registered in Panama, the Probo Koala, chartered by the oil and commodity shipping company Trafigura Beheer BV, disposed of toxic waste in the Ivorian port of Abidjan.

In November 2006, the High Court of Justice in London agreed to hear a group action by about 30,000 claimants from Côte d'Ivoire against Trafigura over the alleged dumping of toxic waste from the Probo Koala. The British law firm Leigh Day had brought one of the biggest group actions in legal history, seeking damages of £100 million. Over 20,000 claimants signed a petition calling for Leigh Day to have responsibility for the payments. Justice MacDuff gave a ruling in October 2009 that Leigh Day should have responsibility for finalising the payments.

In September 2009, there was an investigation into the identity of Claude Gouhourou, who claimed to represent 30,000 claimants. Leigh Day had worked out a system for the payment of each claimant through the use of a payment card to be used at automated teller machines in Abidjan. The PINs for the cards were given out in October, but, just as this process was coming to an end and before the cards could be distributed, Leigh Day and the bank were served with a freezing order on the account.

Gouhourou protested the funds transfer and insisted that he was one of the fifty or so representatives of the many communities in Abidjan affected by the toxic waste. In his evidence he stated that he and the other representatives had set up a coordinating association of which he was the president and that this association had the responsibility for distributing the compensation money.

On 22 January 2010, Gouhourou provided documents to prove his case that have since been shown to be false. The other representatives all deny the existence of any such association, the representatives who supposedly signed the association's inauguration papers deny the signatures were theirs, and the town hall where the association was supposedly registered deny this occurred and their stamp was forged. Leigh Day lodged criminal allegations with the Ivorian prosecuting authorities about these actions. Claude Gohourou was sentenced to 20 years in prison in January 2015.

In the aftermath of the Gouhourou fraud case, the English High Court ruled that Leigh Day had been negligent in its management of the compensation payments. £6 million of the compensation package had been embezzled, leaving 6,000 claimants without compensation. Judge Andrew Smith noted that Martyn Day had ignored warnings that Côte d'Ivoire's unstable political and financial systems would leave the funds vulnerable to embezzlement and that the funds should instead be distributed from a European account. Instead, the firm pushed ahead with using an Ivorian account.

=== Iraq torture allegations against British soldiers ===
Day successfully represented the family of Baha Mousa in a civil case bought against the British Ministry of Defence and obtained compensation for his family. On 27 March 2008, the British Defence Secretary, Des Browne, admitted to "substantial breaches" of the European Convention of Human Rights over the murder of Baha Mousa. In July 2008, the Ministry of Defence agreed to pay £2.83 million in compensation to the family of Baha Mousa and nine other men, following an admission of "substantive breaches" of articles 2 and 3 (right to life and prohibition of torture) of the European Convention on Human Rights by the British Army.

Following the battle of Danny Boy in May 2004, it was falsely alleged that British Soldiers captured 31 Iraqis following an ambush in May 2004, before killing 22 and leaving only nine injured survivors.

On 25 November 2009, Bob Ainsworth, then the British Minister of State for the Armed Forces, announced that a retired High Court judge Sir Thayne Forbes would chair the public inquiry into allegations that 20 Iraqis, taken prisoner during the battle, were murdered and that others were tortured. The British Ministry of Defence denied that the 20 were captured, but that 20 bodies were removed from the battlefield for identification and then returned to the families, and that a further nine prisoner were taken and held for questioning but were not mistreated.

In March 2014, Counsel acting for the Iraqis conceded that the murder allegations would not be pursued in closing submissions. The Al-Sweady Inquiry nevertheless went on to make detailed findings and found that no Iraqis had been murdered by British troops during the battle and that the allegations of unlawful killings were based on “deliberate lies, reckless speculation and ingrained hostility” by the Iraqi plaintiffs. The detainees were found to have been mistreated in a number of respects, although the most serious allegations of abuse were rejected. As a result, Leigh Day and Public Interest Lawyers (which closed in August 2016) were referred to the Solicitors Regulatory Authority for possible disciplinary action.

==== Disciplinary hearing ====
In April 2017, Martyn Day and colleague Sapna Malik, solicitors at Leigh Day, faced a disciplinary hearing for an alleged breach of Solicitors Regulation Authority rules, which was conducted by the Solicitors Disciplinary Tribunal. They were cleared of all charges in June 2017, and the judgment upheld by the High Court in October 2018.

The case centred on whether Leigh Day made prohibited referral fees adding up to £75,000; failed to deliver crucial documents to the Al-Sweady Inquiry into allegations of abuses by British soldiers in Iraq; and continued to maintain allegations and to seek damages "when it was improper to do so". Day and Malik contested the allegations. The charges dated back to the five-year Al-Sweady inquiry into civilian claims of abuse by British soldiers in 2004 during the Iraq War. The inquiry was concluded in 2014 when chairman Sir Thayne Forbes declared many of the claims were false or exaggerated. In the report, Forbes said the most serious claims "have been found to be wholly without foundation and entirely the product of deliberate lies, reckless speculation and ingrained hostility". On 12 June 2017, Leigh Day was cleared of all misconduct charges by the Solicitors Disciplinary Tribunal.

=== Mau Mau Uprising ===
Day helped to fight for the right of Kenyan victims of torture at the hands of colonial officials during the 1950s Mau Mau Uprising to sue the UK government for compensation. Leigh Day sued the British government on behalf of 5,228 former insurgents in 2010, and the British Foreign Office agreed to a £19.9 million settlement in 2013.

In October 2014, the Law Society of Kenya launched legal proceedings against Leigh Day at the High Court in Nairobi, claiming that the £6.6 million claimed by the firm in legal fees was disproportionate to the compensation provided to the Mau Mau torture victims. The Law Society complaint also alleged that Leigh Day had practised in Kenya without being qualified to represent the claimants and without a valid licence. Leigh Day was also accused of failing to distribute compensation in full and fabricating some of the names on the list of victims.

== Journalism ==
Day has also written articles for The Guardian and The Times.

== Honours ==
In 2014, Day was awarded an honorary Doctor of Laws degree by the University of Warwick.
