= Yasmin Monet Prince =

English actress (born 1998/1999)

- Born: 1998/1999 (age 26–27)
- Occupation: Actress
- Years active: 2016–present

Yasmin Monet Prince (born 1998/1999) is a British actress.

== Early life and education ==
Yasmin Monet Prince was born in 1998 or 1999. She grew up in Sydenham, South London.

She joined the youth company at Shakespeare's Globe, and attended the BRIT School.

== Career ==
Prince made her screen debut in the 2016 Mahalia Belo TV film Ellen for Channel 4.

She had a recurring role as Clara Mahan in season one of the action series Hanna, as a friend of the eponymous lead character; she was promoted to a series regular in season two.

In 2020, Prince appeared in one episode of the limited anthology series Unsaid Stories, opposite Nicholas Pinnock, and was also named a Screen International Star of Tomorrow.

In 2021, she played Alison in the British romantic comedy film Boxing Day.

In 2023, she played Ruth in the single season of the Sky Max comedy drama series Then You Run. She played Ashley in the 2024 comedy drama film Portraits of Dangerous Women (2024), alongside Tara Fitzgerald, with Mark Lewis Jones as her father.

== Filmography ==
Television and film roles
| Year | Title | Role | Notes |
|---|---|---|---|
| 2016 | Ellen | Kayla | TV movie |
| 2017 | Holby City | Emily Willis | 1 episode |
| 2018 | Dark Heart | Laura Murray | 2 episodes |
| 2019–2020 | Hanna | Clara Mahan | Recurring role (seasons 1–2) |
| 2020 | Unsaid Stories | Justina | 1 episode |
| 2021 | Boxing Day | Alison | |
| 2023 | Then You Run | Ruth | Miniseries |
| 2024 | Supacell | Veronica | Recurring role |
| 2024 | Portraits of Dangerous Women | Ashley | |
