= The Heart Keeper =

2019 novel by Alex Dahl

- First edition (UK)
- Author: Alex Dahl
- Language: English
- Genre: Nordic noir psychological novel
- Publisher: Head of Zeus (UK); Berkley Books (US)
- Publication date: 2019
- Publication place: United Kingdom
- Media type: Paperback
- ISBN: 9780451491817

The Heart Keeper is a 2019 Nordic noir psychological novel by Norwegian author Alex Dahl. It was published in English in 2019 by Berkley Books, a Penguin Random House imprint. Set in Norway, it tells the story of the loss of a child through the eyes of two different women. Critic Paul Burke described it as "a powerful study of grief and loss, guilt, recriminations, trauma and PTSD, and survival." Norwegian newspaper Dagbladet described Dahl in 2019 as a new star of Nordic noir literature.

== Background ==
Dahl attributes the inspiration for The Heart Keeper to "an incident years ago when the life of her first child was saved by the neo-natal care unit at Ullevål University Hospital."
