= The Stolen Girl =

2025 British television miniseries

- Genre: Crime drama
- Based on: Playdate by Alex Dahl
- Written by: Catherine Moulton
- Directed by: Eva Husson
- Starring: Holliday Grainger; Denise Gough; Ambika Mod
- Country of origin: United Kingdom
- Original language: English
- No. of episodes: 5

Production
- Executive producers: Tanya Seghatchian; John Woodward; Nicola Shindler; Alex Dahl; Johanna Deveraux; Eva Husson; Catherine Moulton
- Producer: James Dean
- Production companies: Quay Street Productions; Brightstar; ITV Studios

Original release
- Network: Disney+
- Release: 16 April 2025

The Stolen Girl is a 2025 British crime drama series starring Denise Gough, Holliday Grainger and Ambika Mod. Directed by Eva Husson, it is an adaptation by Catherine Moulton of the 2020 novel Playdate by Alex Dahl. The series was released on 16 April 2025 on Disney+ internationally and on both Freeform and Hulu in the US. The five 60-minute episodes were broadcast on free-to-air in the UK at prime time on Wednesdays during March 2026 on ITV1.

== Premise ==
Playdate follows a mother of two whose life is upended when she agrees to let her nine-year-old daughter attend a sleepover at her new best friend’s house. The next day, upon picking her up, she discovers that the seemingly beautiful home is actually a holiday rental and her daughter has gone missing. The story follows a manhunt across Europe as she searches for her child.

== Cast and characters ==
- Holliday Grainger as Rebecca Walsh
- Ambika Mod as Selma Desai
- Denise Gough as Elisa Blix
- Jim Sturgess as Fred Blix
- Bronagh Waugh as DI Shona Sinclair
- Michael Workeye as Kaleb Negasi
- Beatrice Campbell as Lucia Blix, Elisa and Fred's daughter
- Paulie Bovingdon as George Blix, Elisa and Marcus' son
- Robyn Betteridge as Josephine "Josie" Thibault
- Xavier Samuel as Marcus Turner
- Lisa Bowerman as Maria Blix, Fred's mother
- Kerry Fox as Deborah Stanton, Elisa's mother
- Steven Pacey as Daniel Stanton, Elisa's father

== Episodes ==
No.	Title	Directed by	Written by	Original release date
1	"Episode 1"	Eva Husson	Catherine Moulton & Alex Dahl	April 16, 2025
Elisa Blix works as a flight attendant for a private hire flight firm. She is late collecting her daughter Lucia from school one day, where she befriends the mother of one of Lucia's new friends, Rebecca. They arrange a playdate where Lucia will stay overnight. Elisa drops Lucia off at Rebecca's house as agreed, and tells her husband Fred, who works as a criminal lawyer, to be at home for Lucia to be returned 12pm the following day. Lucia is not returned the next day, and when Elisa and Fred go to Rebecca's house they are shocked to find it unoccupied except for a cleaning lady who tells them that it is a short-let holiday home and that nobody else is there. The police are called, a press conference is organized, and an investigation commences. It emerges that Fred had commenced a brief intrigue with a woman he met online, who took things badly when he ended it, and also that for one of the criminal cases, he was defending a client for involvement in organized crime. Meanwhile, Selma Desai, a journalist, decides to take a particular interest in the case after attending the press conference.
2	"Episode 2"	Eva Husson	Catherine Moulton	April 16, 2025
The two young girls are shown happily playing hide and seek at Rebecca's house. Rebecca asks Lucia about her father's profession as a lawyer, before suggesting that she naps on the sofa if she is feeling tired. Once Lucia is asleep, a man arrives and takes her away in his car. Elisa posts on her social media page an appeal for information with a photo she had taken of Rebecca's daughter at the time of the playdate. Five days later, an envelope is posted through the front door of the Blix house. It is a ransom demand, which Elisa wants to pay but the police advise caution. Elisa discovers on asking the bank to raise £100,000 against their home that there is already a £200,000 loan taken out against it by her husband, of which she was unaware. Selma has paid £500 to a policeman for information on the case, including a doorbell cam image of the person who delivered the ransom note, but their face is obscured by a baseball cap. Selma discovers that the person is Rachel Lamont, a serial con artist, which she communicates to Elisa. However she annoys Elisa by asking her why there is no digital trace of her prior to her marriage to Fred. The police arrest Rachel Lamont, while Fred follows one of his clients, Stephen Bailey, who is a witness in an organised crime trial. They argue, with Fred accusing him of involvement in Lucia's kidnapping, with Bailey denying this. The police find CCTV footage of Lucia with the kidnapper at a petrol station in northern France. Later she is shown arriving at a house with the kidnapper, where she meets Rebecca and her daughter again; Rebecca is now brunette instead of the blonde she previously appeared to be. Rebecca welcomes her, addressing her as Lulu-Rose.
3	"Episode 3"	Eva Husson	Catherine Moulton	April 16, 2025
Rebecca is shown 9 months previously shopping in a town in France where she unexpectedly meets an old acquaintance, Delphine, who addresses her as Nina. Delphine asks after Nicolas, who Nina says died 4 years previously. Delphine also refers to Nina's twin daughters. They part, with Nina visibly uncomfortable. She is shown a few months later asking a waitress, Laura, to introduce her to a man called Milan Matkovic, which Laura refuses to do. Rebecca claims that her daughter was taken from her following her husband's death and is growing up in another family. In the present, Lucia is seen to have trouble adjusting to her situation, with Rebecca telling her that this is her new home. Selma is seen investigating Elisa and discovers that she was born in a religious commune, which Selma visits. She meets Deborah Stanton, Elisa's mother, who confirms that Elisa and she did not get on and that they last met 5 years ago; Deborah has disowned Elisa. Fred is arrested then released; the police identify Matkovic and Laura and question Fred and Elisa who do not recognise the photos of them. The police also ask Fred to explain where the £200,000 he borrowed is; he claims it is spent on various family and home expenses. Lucia, now addressed as Lulu by Rebecca, is shown photos of herself as a baby with Nicolas, her father; Lulu recognises her own birthmark in the photo. Rebecca tells her that Nicolas died in an accident 5 years previously. She also discovers that the police know Matkovic's identity. Selma writes a story implying that Elisa's troubled past in the commune led to her carelessness in leaving her daughter with a complete stranger, which upsets Elisa and Fred. French police discover a blood trace at a house in France, concluding that Matkovic took Lucia there; the French press has front-page photos of Lucia in the newspapers. Rebecca, Josephine and Lucia encounter Delphine's family on an excursion; Lucia introduces herself as Lulu-Rose. Rebecca is later seen editing photos of the children to add Lucia's birthmark.
4	"Episode 4"	Eva Husson	Catherine Moulton	April 16, 2025
Elisa does a radio interview to set the record straight and appeal for further help from the public to identify Rebecca, but leaves it in distress halfway through. Selma visits the commune again and discovers that Elisa had actually been present on the day her father, Daniel Stanton, had died 5 years previously, and that there had also been a fatal road accident in the vicinity that same day; the police had had to deal with both incidents. The kidnap vehicle is recovered by the French police; Rebecca gets a new fake passport for Lucia; Lucia spies Rebecca's secret hiding place for a lockbox containing cash, passports and valuables. Elisa is shocked to find a social worker on her return to the house who is responding to concerns about George, her and Fred's son. Selma, against repeated instructions from her boss to stay off the story, discovers a link between Marcus Turner Hotels, Elisa, Rebecca and the fatal traffic accident. She texts Elisa asking if she knows Marcus Turner; Elisa is seen reading a letter to herself that Turner has written from prison. Selma meets a distraught Elisa, deducing that she and Turner had had an affair. Selma's research reveals that Turner had killed Nicolas Thibault and his daughter Rose in the accident and pleaded guilty to vehicular manslaughter. She retrieves archive photos of the trial and sees Rebecca in them, identified as Nina Thibault, realising that she matches the description of the woman who kidnapped Lucia. Elisa later visits Turner in prison. She apologises for never visiting or replying to his letters, he refers to George as his son. He reveals that Nina Thibault came to see him previously and questioned him about the events on the day but he denies that he mentioned to her or anyone else about Elisa's involvement in the accident. Elisa sees a photo of Nina and recognises her as Rebecca, and shows this to Fred who recognises her as the woman who he had previously met online. They realise that Lucia is almost certainly in Toulon, France. Rebecca is awoken by an intruder which turns out to be Matkovic, who wants more money to disappear. They fight but she manages to kill him with a knitting needle. She later disposes of his body in a disused well. Selma meets Elisa, and is persuaded not to pass their knowledge onto the police on condition that Elisa drops the official complaint she previously made, and that they both go to France together to find Lucia.
5	"Episode 5"	Eva Husson	Conrad Hamilton & Eva Husson	April 16, 2025
Five years previously, Turner and Elisa are shown starting their affair. She explains her difficult upbringing in the commune and that her father is now terminally ill. They agree to visit him together with Lucia. At the visit, it is revealed that Elisa suffered sexual abuse at the hands of her father when young and in an angry confrontation, he falls down the stairs and dies. The collision is then shown: Nina and Josephine had got out of the car because Josephine was ill and the Range Rover driven by Turner to the commune earlier is seen hitting the Thibault's parked car and then driving away. In the present the UK police are now aware that Selma and Elisa have flown to France, who are in Toulon and searching for where Nina lives. They start looking around the local schools for Josephine but realise that she is likely to be homeschooled and go to the Mayor's office to find out, where they find Nina's address. Nina gets the fake passport but has been spotted and reported to the local police. Lucia opens Nina's lockbox and sees photos and that they had been artificially altered. She leaves the house and discovers the well containing Matkovic's body. She meets a neighbour on the way back, whom she asks for help, but they are intercepted by Nina. Lucia runs out of the house again, then Elisa and Selma arrive. Nina and Elisa meet and argue; it is revealed that it was Elisa, not Marcus Turner, who was driving the car which killed Nina's daughter and husband, and Turner had taken the blame because Elisa was pregnant with George, their son. Elisa searches for Lucia and finds her safe and well. Nina and Josephine are seen driving away together. Three months later Fred and Elisa meet at and discuss her pending sentencing; she has told him about George. Elisa is sentenced to six years in prison for her crimes.

== Production ==
The project was announced as a five-part series in June 2023, commissioned by Disney+ UK, as their second original series after Suspect: The Shooting of Jean Charles de Menezes. Originally titled Playdate, it was produced by Quay Street Productions, part of ITV Studios and Brightstar. First look images from the production were released in January 2025 with the series named The Stolen Girl.

=== Filming ===
Filming began in Manchester in June 2023. Filming also took place at Blackpool Airport, Cheadle Hulme School, and The Glass House in Fulwood Park, Liverpool. Eyton was set in the old mill town of Marsden located in West Yorkshire.

== Reception ==
On the review aggregator website Rotten Tomatoes, 87% of 15 critics' reviews are positive, with an average rating of 6.3/10. The website's consensus reads: "Stolen Girl doesn't aim for prestige, instead locking into its mystery to solidly entertain, keeping the audience rapt with attention until the satisfying end."

In December 2025, Disney announced that The Stolen Girl was among the most-watched international original series released on Disney+ in 2025. Writing in The Guardian, Lucy Mangan gave it three stars saying 'You will forget this enjoyably preposterous thriller within five seconds of finishing it', and 'It won’t linger in your mind for a second after you finish it, but you will have had five hours of a pretty good time.
