= Robyn Betteridge =

English actress (born 2011)

- Born: 17 August 2011 (age 15)
- Years active: 2018–present
- Website: www.robynbetteridge.com

Robyn Betteridge (born 17 August 2011) is an English child actress, model and contortionist. On television, she is best known for her role in the Amazon Prime series My Lady Jane (2024). She also appeared in the BBC One series The Gold (2023–2024) and the Disney+ series The Stolen Girl (2025).

== Early life ==
Betteridge grew up in Lower Stondon, Bedfordshire.

== Career ==
At age 7, Betteridge signed with the modeling agency Kids London. She had gigs with the likes of Next and FatFace. She also took up contortion.

Filmed in 2019, Betteridge made her television debut as Helga Grinwell in an episode of the 2021 Amazon Prime series The Wheel of Time. In 2023, she and her younger sister Skylar played Marnie Palmer's (Stefanie Martin) daughters in the BBC One drama The Gold. Betteridge also guest starred in an episode of the Disney+ series Willow as a young version of Princess Kit (Ruby Cruz). She received Young Artist Award nominations for both performances in the supporting and guest categories respectively, winning the latter.

Betteridge was then cast in the 2024 Amazon Prime historical fantasy series My Lady Jane as the titular Jane's younger sister Margaret Grey. For her performance, Betteridge has been nominated for her third Young Artist Award. This was followed by a role as Josephine "Josie" Thibault in the 2025 Disney+ mystery series The Stolen Girl.

== Filmography ==
Year	Title	Role	Notes
2021	The Wheel of Time	Helga Grinwell	Episode: "The Dragon Reborn"
2023	Willow	Young Kit	Episode: "Children of the Wyrm"
2023–2024	The Gold	Palmer's Daughter	6 episodes
2024	My Lady Jane	Margaret Grey	8 episodes
2025	The Stolen Girl	Josephine "Josie" Thibault	5 episodes

== Awards and nominations ==
Year	Award	Category	Work	Result	Ref.
2024	Young Artist Awards	Best Performance in a TV Series – Supporting Youth Artist	The Gold	Nominated	
2024	Young Artist Awards	Best Performance in a Streaming Series – Guest Youth Artist	Willow	Won	
2025	Young Artist Awards	Best Performance in a Streaming Series – Leading Young Artist	My Lady Jane	Nominated	
2025	Young Artist Awards	Outstanding Dancer		Won	
2026	Young Artist Awards	Best Leading Performance by a Young Artist in a Streaming Series	The Stolen Girl	Won	
