= Cillian O'Sullivan =

American-born Irish actor

Cillian O'Sullivan (born 1989 or 1990) is an American-born Irish actor who has had roles in Then You Run (Sky 2023), In From the Cold (Netflix 2022), Bull (CBS 2019), Vikings (History 2016), 6Degrees (BBC 2012), Single-Handed (RTÉ 2009), and Seacht (BBC/TG4 2008).

Born in New York to Irish parents, O'Sullivan's family moved back to Ireland when he was a child, and he attended school in Ballinlough, Cork. From an Irish-speaking family, his first television roles were in Irish language productions for TG4. After roles in several BBC productions, and playing Bobby Storey in the 2017 film Maze, O'Sullivan moved to the US, obtaining recurring roles in NBC and Netflix series. Misty Button, in which he had a lead role, won the "best narrative feature" at the 2019 San Luis Obispo International Film Festival.

In 2021, he filmed a Sky Studios series titled Then You Run, which was released in July 2023. As of 2022, O'Sullivan was reportedly working on a film titled The Lost Princess.

In 2025, O'Sullivan appeared as Devlin, an Irish gangster, in Daredevil: Born Again, and as Dr. Roger Korby in the third season of Star Trek: Strange New Worlds.
