= Then You Run =

- Genre: Dark comedy; Thriller
- Created by: Ben Chanan
- Based on: You by Zoran Drvenkar
- Written by: Ben Chanan; Fintan Ryan; Nyla Levy; Catherine Moulton
- Directed by: Robert McKillop; Delyth Thomas; Paul Walker
- Starring: Leah McNamara; Vivian Oparah; Yasmin Monet Prince; Isidora Fairhurst; Christian Rubeck; Cillian O'Sullivan; Francis Magee; Darren Cahill; Richard Coyle; Famke Janssen
- Countries of origin: United Kingdom; Germany
- Original languages: English; German
- No. of seasons: 1
- No. of episodes: 8

Production
- Production companies: Kudos; MadeFor; Sky Studios

Original release
- Network: Sky Max
- Release: 7 July – 25 August 2023

Then You Run is a dark comedy television series created by Ben Chanan and based on the novel You (2014) by Zoran Drvenkar. The eight-episode series premiered on 7 July 2023 on Sky Max.

It depicts four English high school friends on summer vacation: Tara (Leah McNamara), "Stink" (Vivian Oparah), Ruth (Yasmin Monet Prince) and Nessi (Isidora Fairhurst). They flee from Tara's uncle Reagan (Richard Coyle) after she killed her father Orin (Cillian O'Sullivan) and stole his heroin. They are pursued across Europe from Rotterdam to Hamburg and then to Norway. The series is directed by Robert McKillop, Delyth Thomas and Paul Walker, with scripts written by Chanan, Fintan Ryan, Nyla Levy and Catherine Moulton.

== Plot ==
Four London high school friends Tara, "Stink", Ruth and Nessi are on their summer holidays. Tara's grandmother dies and Tara decides to stay with her long-estranged father, Orin, in Rotterdam. The other three want to go to Zante. While visiting Orin, Tara discovers he is a drug dealer for his older brother Reagan. Orin maintains that Tara's mother, Maggie, died in a car accident, in 2004. Tara invites her three friends to join her. Just before they arrive Tara consumes high-grade heroin, sees Maggie on Orin's laptop and kills Orin. When "Stink", Ruth and Nessi arrive they find Tara drugged and Orin's frozen corpse. "Stink" steals a 5 kg heroin cache and plans to sell it to Darian. Darian is Reagan's wastrel and disappointing son. Ruth starts flushing heroin down the toilet but "Stink" saves 3 kg. Reagan was delivering heroin to rival German drug boss Dagmar to convince her to import drugs directly to Rotterdam before dispersal Europe-wide.

With Nessi driving, the four women flee in Orin's car towards Maggie's hotel in Norway. Reagan sends Darian to follow but he must avoid Dagmar's notice when traversing Germany. Along the way, "Stink" befriends a musician, Marten. The four friends visit Marten at a festival, Eisenschtompschtomp, near Hamburg, where they sell heroin. Reagan, his henchman Turi, and Darian track the women to Eisenschtompschtomp. Upon escaping Tara, Ruth and Nessi swap cars with Marten. Darian and Reagan ram Orin's car, killing Marten. Reagan is injured and arrested. Tara, Ruth and Nessi take Marten's car to a police station. Dagmar, also a federal police inspector, questions Tara and Reagan. Dagmar releases Tara, Ruth and Nessi but has them followed to Denmark. Dagmar arranges for Reagan's kidnapping. Turi captures "Stink" and collects Darian. Turi but cannot kill "Stink" as she is pregnant. "Stink" subverts Darian after he learns Turi killed his friend. Turi kills himself and Darian takes "Stink" to Denmark. Tara kills a policewoman and shoots off Ruth's finger tip.

Ruth is left at hospital for treatment. Dagmar abducts Ruth and follows other women onto Skagerrak ferry towards Norway. Reagan escapes, kills Dagmar's men, and hires fishermen to follow Tara. Tara and Nessi update "Stink" and Darian. Serial killer and Marten's father, "the Traveller", chats to Tara. He learns she is going to Maggie's hotel. Later "the Traveller" kills Dagmar. Tara grabs Dagmar's keys. Nessi drives Tara and "Stink" with Ruth unbeknownst hidden in boot. Tara, Nessi and "Stink" push car off cliff and fortuitously release Ruth. The four women reach Maggie's hotel but are followed by Reagan, "the Traveller", Dagmar's crew and Darian. Tara discovers she hallucinated that Maggie was still alive. "The Traveller" starts killing people at the hotel, including Darian and Dagmar's crew. He captures both Tara and Reagan, who has admitted he's Tara's father. "The Traveller"'s about to kill Tara in front of Reagan when "Stink", Ruth and Nessi interrupt. "The Traveller" moves towards them when Tara lunges and kills him instead. The four women and Reagan leave the hotel.

== Cast and characters ==
=== Main cast ===
- Leah McNamara as Tara O'Rourke/Jacobson: London-based 17-year-old, raised by her grandmother as Orin and Maggie's daughter
- Vivian Oparah as "Stink" née Jalani Okoro: Tara's schoolmate, most irresponsible, least law-abiding
- Yasmin Monet Prince as Ruth: Tara's schoolmate, most responsible, law-abiding
- Isidora Fairhurst as Nessi: Tara's schoolmate, befriends Mirko, easily led by others
- Christian Rubeck as "the Traveller": German-based serial killer, Marten's father, Eva's ex-husband
- Cillian O'Sullivan as Orin O'Rourke: Reagan's brother, Tara's father; Rotterdam resident, ostensibly an advertising jingle writer while redirecting drugs for Reagan
- Francis Magee as Turi: Reagan's second-in-charge, assassin, Darian's mentor
- Darren Cahill as Darian O'Rourke: Reagan's son; vain, ineffectual, party-orientated
- Richard Coyle as Reagan O'Rourke: Orin's brother, Irish drug boss, illegally imports through Rotterdam
- Famke Janssen as Dagmar: German federal police inspector, ruthless drug boss, Reagan's rival

=== Supporting ===
- Lise Risom Olsen as Maggie/Majgull Jacobson: Orin's wife, Tara's mother
- Welket Bungué as Julius: Dagmar's Rotterdam representative
- Carl Shaaban as Leo: Reagan's henchman
- Annabelle Mandeng as Katjya: Dagamar's crew member, Lukas's lover, aspires to take over
- Leander Vyvey as Lukas: Dagmar's police associate/henchman, Katjya's lover
- Lea Marlen Woitack as Saskia: Orin's girlfriend
- Anton Nürnberg as Marten Weber: "The Traveller" and Eva's son, German wannabe drill musician
- Aron Hegarty as Davey: Reagan's henchman, interprets German (poorly), banned from jobs
- Lazar Dragojevic as Mirko: Rotterdam pizza seller, minor drug dealer, Darian's friend
- Holger Daemgen as Walter Fischer: Police Commissioner

== Episodes ==
No. in season	Title	Directed by	Written by	Original release date
1	"Anti-Zante"	Robert McKillop	Ben Chanan	7 July 2023
2005: Traveller stops on snow-bound highway, exits car and kills victims in line ahead. Now: Turi reports: cannabis crop's ruined, Orin's car's gone and heroin's missing. Darian finds Orin's frozen corpse. One month earlier: Tara and friends attend her grandmother's funeral. Tara's not going to Zante but to Rotterdam to see Orin. Orin picks up Tara. She's impressed by his expensive car and home. Tara meets Saskia. Orin declares Tara cannot use indoor pool. Tara finds photo of Maggie and her hotel. Tara relives crash, which killed Maggie. At Tara's birthday celebration, she meets Reagan and Darian. Tara follows Reagan outside; he questions Jakob with Davey interpreting. Dagmar sent Jakob to report on coastguard. Turi drips acid on Jakob. When Davey cannot translate, Tara does. Orin explains how Reagan supported him after Maggie died. Orin agrees to let Tara's friends visit. Orin shows pool, with cannabis. Stink befriends Marten on bus, he's visiting his girlfriend. Nessi and Ruth laugh at Stink's embarrassment. Tara's not answering phone. Mirko invites Stink for swim. Tara phones Stink; women follow Tara's phone to Orin's home. Find Tara drugged. Tara remembers seeing Maggie via Orin's laptop. Orin said Tara owns hotel. Tara shows Orin's corpse in freezer.
2	"The Martyr"	Robert McKillop	Ben Chanan	7 July 2023
2010: Traveller enters motel, kills night manager and 22 occupants. Now: Reagan discovers Orin's head wound, orders Davey to bring Mirko. Two days earlier: Tara sees Reagan's call. Tara shows the marijuana crop. Stink and Nessi surmise Orin had heart attack until they see blood on laptop. Ruth believes Tara consumed cocaine. Stink finds heroin; asks Nessi to contact Mirko. Mirko tells Darian and Leo that English women left. Stink and Nessi search Orin's corpse for car keys. Nessi drives mustang to Mirko, whom Stink asks to find 5kg cocaine buyer. Mirko introduces Darian, who snorts some, which works well. Darian tells Mirko they will steal cocaine to sell. When Stink arrives Ruth has flushed 2kg; Stink and Ruth fight over remainder. Nessi agrees with Stink: they will sell rest, Ruth tags along. Nessi drives Range Rover. Reagan notices Darian's drugged. Darian describes Stink's deal. Reagan orders Darian to dump Mirko. Tara wakes but cannot find others, all heroin's gone. Darian captures Ruth. Reagan tells Stink it's his € 2,500,000 heroin. Reagan orders Darian to hurt Ruth. Reagan threatens Stink: heroin returned to Orin, all women gone or they die. Tara fixes Ruth's dislocated shoulder. Stink suggests driving to Norway and Maggie's hotel.
3	"Scenes from an Erdbeerhof"	Robert McKillop	Fintan Ryan	14 July 2023
2016: Traveller boards train, kills porter and 104 passengers. Now: Orin's corpse laid on table. Leo calls: women travelling towards Germany. Reagan: catch up before border; avoid Dagmar's territory. Turi sends Tara: photo of Mirko's corpse. Nessi sees it, stops at service centre. Tara hallucinates seeing Maggie. Nessi resumes driving. Julius visits Reagan to collect heroin. Leo reports: women in Germany. Tara orders phones off: avoid tracking. Reagan orders Darian: follow women, keep low profile. Darian takes Davey to recover heroin. Reagan lies to Julius: heroin's inside shipping container. Julius gives Reagan 24 hours. Tara destroys car's GPS tracker. Nessi drives to Erdbeerhof shop. Ruth phones her mother. Davey directs Darian to Erdbeerhof. Tara considers leaving but sees Darian. Davey wants to kill women, follows Stink. Stink buys pregnancy test. Girl, Klara, steals Stink's bag, Women follow girl; Darian and Davey pursue. Ruth learns Stink stole heroin. Davey asks Klara to join him. While Davey and Klara's father fight, Stink wrests bag. Davey starts shooting. Tara knocks out Darian. Davey points loaded gun at women; Tara stabs him dead. At Orin's funeral, Julius describes Erdbeerhof shoot-out; Orin's car nearby. Reagan agrees to take Julius to heroin but kills him. Dagmar meets Darian.
4	"Eisenschtompschtomp"	Delyth Thomas	Nyla Levy	14 July 2023
This Year: Traveller does not kill anyone at cinema. Reagan’s car stopped in Germany by Dagmar, who asks for heroin. When Reagan lies, Dagmar's henchmen reveal Darian. Tara suggests selling heroin to pay for Norway trip. Stink remembers Marten's at Eisenschtompschtomp, Hamburg. Dagmar and Reagan agree to recover heroin. Nessi puts heroin-filled condom inside her vagina; others hide packets inside chip bags. They enter Eisenschtompschtomp. Women start selling. Reagan recalls Orin enthusing about impregnating Maggie. Reagan directed to Eisenschtompschtomp. Stink sells heroin to Marten's bandmates. Reagan sees Orin's car; Turi and Leo arrive. Katjya follows Reagan. Reagan remembers ordering Orin to abandon Maggie. Ruth removes heroin from Nessi. Stink stabs Darian's nose with her positive pregnancy test. Turi chases Stink. Stink yells on PA, to meet at car. Marten provides cunnilingus for Stink. Turi knocks out Marten. Darian and Leo chase women. Reagan points gun at Tara; he's hit by Nessi's car. Stink sees car's gone. Katjya takes Reagan's gun. Tara snatches Marten's keys; Nessi drives Marten's car. Marten follows in Orin's car. Reagan recovers, collected by Darian. They follow Marten, ram Orin's car, which flips over. Reagan and Darian see Marten dead. Police notify Marten's mother, who informs Traveller.
5	"Eyes on the Prize"	Delyth Thomas	Catherine Moulton	21 July 2023
Traveller gives Marten's birthday present: his car. Traveller, ex-wife and her second husband discuss Marten's death. Tara, Nessi and Ruth arrive at police station. Tara advises against mentioning drugs. Walter sees Marten's car and detains them. Nessi hides bag on cleaner's trolley. Reagan sits in cafe, recalls meeting Maggie. Walter photographs and fingerprints Tara. Policewoman apprehends Reagan. Tara and Reagan see each other. Reagan remembers Orin marrying Maggie. Walter questions Tara, who claims Marten asked to swap cars. Policewoman informs Walter: federals taking over. Dagmar asks Walter to summarise situation. Lukas turns off CCTV. Dagmar questions Reagan, who says he will take care of Tara. Dagmar knows Tara's connections with Orin, Davey and Marten. Dagmar wants her drugs. Tara offers to reveal Dagmar's traitor in exchange for freedom. Reagan reminisces having sex with Maggie. Walter tells Traveller that women and Reagan involved in Marten's death. Nessi and Ruth kiss. Traveller sees Tara. Tara claims not to recognise Reagan. Dagmar releases women. Tara collects Stink's bag and exits. Traveller follows police driving women towards Danish border. Dagmar's crew collect Reagan. Tara shoots policewoman with her own gun when she finds heroin; Tara shoots Ruth's fingertip off before she phones ambulance.
6	"We're Pregnant"	Delyth Thomas	Fintan Ryan	21 July 2023
Reagan and Darian separate after seeing Orin's car explode. "Stink" hides in a forest but she's captured by Turi. Turi tells her that Marten's dead. He loads his gun but allows "Stink" to pray. "Stink" tells Turi she's pregnant. Turi refuses to kill her, now: it's against his code of harming innocent children. Turi picks up Darian, who confirms "Stink"'s pregnancy. "Stink" tries to escape but is recaptured. Darian's unable to kill "Stink" for Turi. Turi drives towards an abortion clinic. "Stink" hears that Darian does not know Mirko's dead. Turi phones "Stink"'s mother for her address. Turi then phones his London contact and arranges to have all residents killed if "Stink" tells Darian about Mirko. Turi and "Stink" enter abortion clinic. Turi sees "Stink"'s foetus during her ultrasound; he kills the doctor after changing his mind about her abortion. "Stink" pretends to agree to have baby and raise it with Turi. "Stink" convinces Darian to search phone's photos: finds Mirko's dead. Turi guards "Stink" while she urinates. Darian turns on Turi but still cannot shoot. Turi kills himself. "Stink" tells Darian that Tara believes Maggie's alive but he remembers her funeral. Dagmar's men torture Reagan but he escapes.
7	"The Skagerrak"	Paul Walker	Ben Chanan, Fintan Ryan	28 July 2023
Police find dead colleague. Doctor treats Ruth's finger. Dagmar apprehends Ruth. Dagmar phones henchmen but Reagan answers: they are dead. Dagmar tells Reagan she will kill Tara. Reagan travel into Denmark. Leo informs Reagan that Interpol raided shipping containers, frozen Reagan's assets. Tara and Nessi on Skagerrak ferry. "Stink" and Darian arrive. As Dagmar boards, Katjya describes Tara entering earlier. Nessi apprises "Stink" and Darian of Ruth and dead policewoman. Their arguments attract passengers' attention, including Traveller. Reagan bribes fishermen Carl and Frederik to transport to Norway. Tara claims Darian has false memory of Maggie's corpse. Reagan kills Carl for not following directions. Traveller describes murder sprees as paintings. Tara describes heading for Maggie's hotel. Katjya alerts Dagmar: Norwegian police due at terminal. Tara updates "Stink" and Nessi on Dagmar's presence. Dagmar follows women below deck; negotiates heroin for Ruth's safety. Traveller kills Dagmar, leaves. Tara takes Dagmar's keys, hides corpse. Tara, "Stink" and Nessi travel via Dagmar's car; Ruth trapped in boot. Guard finds Dagmar's corpse, calls police. Nessi drives off ferry. Lukas to Katjya: Dagmar's dead. Frederik and son leave by dinghy. Darian learns Reagan's pursuing women. Tara convinces "Stink" and Nessi to roll car toward cliff edge.
8	"It Will Get Darker"	Paul Walker	Ben Chanan, Fintan Ryan	28 July 2023
Women push car tottering on cliff edge. Boot flips open, Ruth falls out, car drops. "Stink" has drugs bag. Four women enter Maggie's hotel; Tara asks for owner. Traveller checks-in. Manager, Steffen explains company bought hotel after Maggie died. Tara realises she hallucinated Maggie instead of Saskia. Ruth recognises Lukas entering hotel. Henchman killed by Reagan, who asks Tara to follow. Ruth picks up henchman's gun, fends off Reagan. Another henchman stops Ruth but Nessi knocks him out. Women enter dining room followed by Katjya, Lukas and Reagan. Tara's told Reagan's her father. Traveller kills people. Reagan negotiates with Katjya for Dagmar's operations. Ruth, Nessi and "Stink" leave. Reagan offers Tara job; she starts leaving but sees Traveller killing attendees. Nessi convinces others to return for Tara. Lukas accidentally kills Katjya; he's killed by Traveller. Traveller pins Reagan's foot to floor with knife. Traveller pursues Tara. Reagan removes knife, follows. Three women find hotel's corpses. Traveller captures Tara. Darian knocks Reagan down. Darian and "Stink" hide as Traveller passes. "Stink" makes noise, Traveller stops, kills Darian. Traveller places Tara in front of Reagan. Three women enter, Traveller advances, Tara grabs knife stabs Traveller, dead. Four women and Reagan leave hotel.

== Production ==
In February 2020, it was announced that Sky had commissioned an eight-part adaptation of Zoran Drvenkar's novel You penned by Ben Chanan from Kudos (under Banijay UK). Chanan would also serve as executive producer along with Karen Wilson and Katie McAleese for Kudos; Kara Manley and Serena Thompson for Sky Studios; and Derek Ritchie as producer. German company MadeFor boarded the production as a co-producer. The German Motion Picture Fund (GMPF) also provided funding for the project.

The cast were revealed in August 2021, with Leah McNamara set to lead the series alongside Vivian Oparah, Yasmin Monet Prince, and Isidora Fairhurst. Also joining the cast were Richard Coyle, Cillian O'Sullivan, Francis Magee, Darren Cahill, and Christian Rubeck.

Principal photography began in June 2021.

== Broadcast ==
The series premiered on 8 July 2023 on Sky Max.
