= Code of Silence (TV series) =

British crime drama television series

- Title card
- Genre: Crime drama
- Created by: Catherine Moulton
- Directed by: Diarmuid Goggins
- Starring: Rose Ayling-Ellis; Kieron Moore; Charlotte Ritchie; Andrew Buchan
- Theme music composer: Dan Jones; Evelyn Glennie
- Country of origin: United Kingdom
- Original language: English
- No. of series: 1
- No. of episodes: 6

Production
- Executive producers: Rose Ayling-Ellis; Catherine Moulton; Tom Leggett; Damien Timmer
- Producer: Joseph Shrubb
- Production companies: Mammoth Screen; ITV Studios

Original release
- Network: ITVX
- Release: 18 May 2025 – present

Code of Silence is a 2025 British crime drama television series for ITVX starring Rose Ayling-Ellis, Andrew Buchan and Charlotte Ritchie about a deaf civilian volunteering to help police with her lip reading skills. It was renewed for a second series later that year.

== Plot ==
Alison Woods is working in the canteen of a Canterbury police station. She is deaf, and a team of police detectives, led by Detective Inspector James Marsh, bring her in to assist in a criminal investigation as an emergency lip reader. The police are using covert surveillance cameras to observe a criminal gang who are plotting a jewellery heist. Accompanied by Detective Sergeant Ashleigh Francis, Alison observes the gang in a public bar, and using her lip-reading skills, Alison is able to unravel the plot.

Alison discovers that a younger member, Liam Barlow, has been recruited by the gang as a security hacker to bypass the security systems at the jewellery vault. After a disagreement with the police team, Alison takes a bar job at the pub frequented by the gang, placing herself in an unauthorised undercover operation. There, she becomes romantically attached to Liam, who takes her on a romantic weekend at a country park hotel. There, Liam observes a wealthy businessman and his family, the targets of the planned robbery. Liam grows suspicious of Alison and hacks her hearing aids via her smartphone, which leads him to discover that she is a police informant. The heist goes ahead – not at the vault, as anticipated, but at the hotel. During the robbery, one of the police detectives is shot. Liam betrays the gang and attempts to make off with the jewellery by himself, offering to take Alison and her mother to live abroad with the proceeds. Braden Moore, the gang leader, uncovers Alison's police involvement and takes her hostage, forcing Liam to hand over the jewels. Liam has contacted the police, who rescue Alison and arrest Liam and the other gang members. Liam stands trial and is sentenced to imprisonment, but promises to come back for her, using his newly acquired sign language skill. DI Marsh congratulates Alison and offers her a training course in becoming an official investigative lip-reader for the police.

== Cast ==
- Rose Ayling-Ellis as Alison Woods
- Kieron Moore as Liam Barlow, "Hoodie"
- Charlotte Ritchie as DS Ashleigh Francis
- Andrew Buchan as DI James Marsh
- Nathan Armarkwei Laryea as DC Ben Lawford
- Joe Absolom as Braden Moore, "Hulk"
- Beth Goddard as Helen Redman, "Cruella"
- Andrew Scarborough as Joseph Holhurst, "Wolf"
- Fifi Garfield as Julie Woods, Alison's mum
- Rolf Choutan as Eithan, Alison’s ex-boyfriend
- John Bishop as Ray Woods, Alison’s dad

== Episodes ==
No.	Title	Directed by	Written by	Original release date
1	"Episode 1"	Diarmuid Goggins	Catherine Moulton	24 July 2025
Alison Woods works as a server in the canteen at the police station. DS Ashleigh Francis asks Alison to use her lip reading skills to help with the investigation of gang of thieves.
2	"Episode 2"	Diarmuid Goggins	Catherine Moulton	24 July 2025
3	"Episode 3"	Diarmuid Goggins	Will Truefitt	31 July 2025
4	"Episode 4"	Chanya Button	Benji Walters	7 August 2025
5	"Episode 5"	Chanya Button	Catherine Moulton	14 August 2025
6	"Episode 6"	Chanya Button	Catherine Moulton	21 August 2025

== Production ==
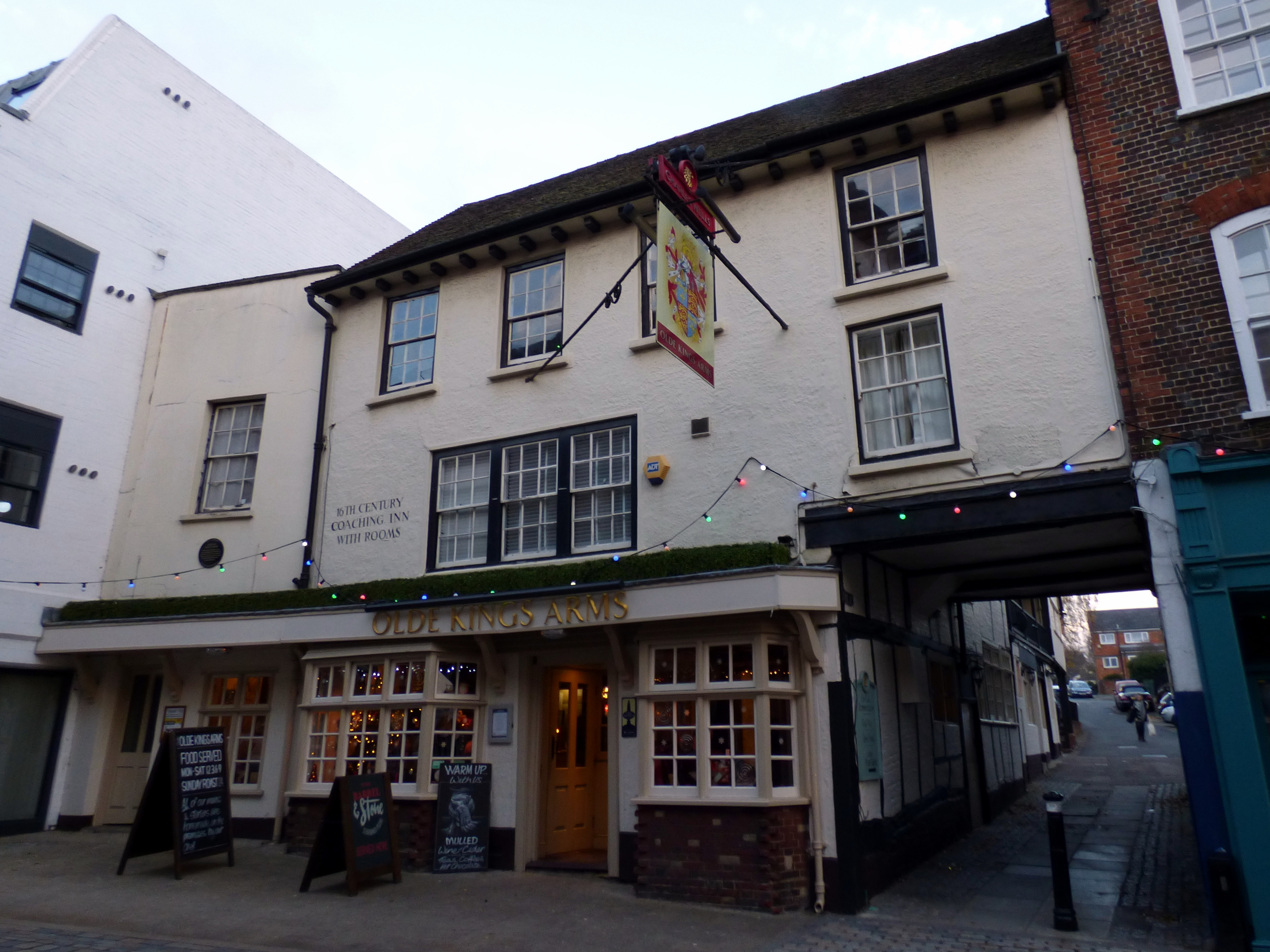
A pub in Hemel Hempstead was used for exterior scenes at The Canterbury Tap

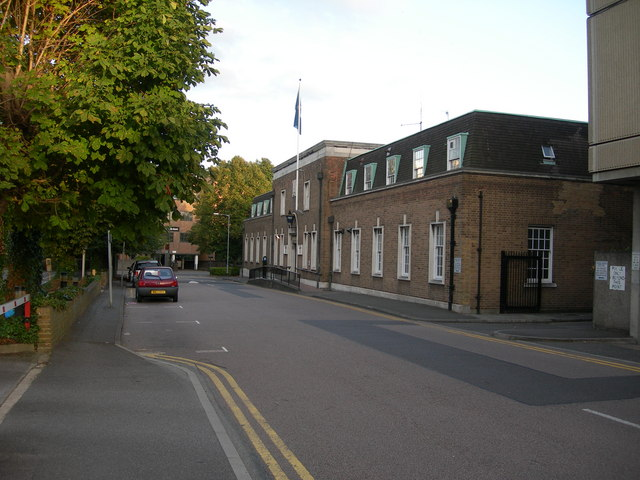
Location filming took place at Watford Police Station

=== Development ===
The series is written by Catherine Moulton and was commissioned by ITVX in May 2023. It is produced by Mammoth Screen for ITVX, and ITV Studios are distributing internationally.

=== Casting ===
The cast is led by Rose Ayling-Ellis, Charlotte Ritchie and Andrew Buchan. The six-part series has Diarmuid Goggins as lead director. Tom Leggett and Damien Timmer are executive producers for Mammoth Screen, alongside Moulton and Ayling-Ellis.

=== Filming ===
Filming began in September 2024 and continued into February 2025. Filming locations include Canterbury, Watford, Hemel Hempstead, Berkhamsted, Wrotham Park and St Albans in Hertfordshire.

=== Sequel ===
It was renewed for a second series in July 2025.

== Broadcast ==
The series became available on 18 May 2025 on ITVX in the United Kingdom. It began airing on 24 July 2025 on BritBox in North America. In India, it is also aired on Lionsgate Play on 1 August 2025.

== Reception ==
The review aggregator website Rotten Tomatoes reported a 100% approval rating based on 24 critic reviews. The website's critics consensus reads, "Rose Ayling-Ellis is terrific in Code of Silence, a sharp crime drama given an compelling wrinkle by its credible depiction of the deaf perspective." On Metacritic the series scored 80 out of 100, based on 9 critics, indicating "Generally Favorable".

Anita Singh in The Daily Telegraph awarded the show four stars and praised the performance of Rose Ayling-Ellis in the lead role, as well as the pacing of the series and the tension it created on the viewer. Lucy Mangan in The Guardian also awarded the show four stars out of five and praised Ayling-Ellis, calling the show a "triumph". Carol Midgely in The Times praised the script which "is written from experience and with veracity" and results in "a fresh, original drama that has done the near impossible and given us a cop drama with something new to say".

== Accolades ==
The series was nominated for New Drama with Rose Ayling-Ellis nominated for Performance in a Drama at the National Television Awards and Best Drama at the British Academy Television Awards. The series was nominated for Best Drama at the 2026 Royal Television Society Programme Awards with Ayling-Ellis nominated for Leading Actor – Female with Catherine Moulton nominated for Writer - Drama.

=== Awards ===
Year	Award	Category	Nominee	Result	Ref.
2025	National Television Awards	Best Drama	Code of Silence	Nominated	
2025	National Television Awards	Best Actress	Rose Ayling-Ellis	Nominated	
2026	Royal Television Society Programme Awards	Best Drama Series	Code of Silence	Nominated	
2026	Royal Television Society Programme Awards	Best Actress	Rose Ayling-Ellis	Nominated	
2026	Royal Television Society Programme Awards	Best Writer - Drama	Catherine Moulton	Nominated	
2026	British Academy Television Awards	Best Drama Series	Code of Silence	Won	
2026	British Academy Television Awards	Best Actress	Rose Ayling-Ellis	Nominated	
