= Boxing Day (2021 film) =

2021 British film directed by Aml Ameen

- Film poster
- Directed by: Aml Ameen
- Written by: Aml Ameen; Bruce Purnell
- Produced by: Aml Ameen; Bruce Purnell; Damien Jones; Dominique Telson; Matthew G. Zamias; Joy Gharoro-Akpojotor
- Starring: Aml Ameen; Aja Naomi King; Leigh-Anne Pinnock; Marianne Jean-Baptiste
- Cinematography: David Pimm
- Edited by: Rebecca Lloyd
- Music by: James Poyser
- Production companies: Film4 Productions; BFI; Rocket Science; DJ Films; Studio 113
- Distributed by: Warner Bros. Pictures (United Kingdom & Ireland); Rocket Science (International)
- Release dates: 3 December 2021 (United Kingdom & Ireland)
- Running time: 109 minutes
- Country: United Kingdom
- Language: English
- Box office: $878,769

Boxing Day is a 2021 British romantic-comedy Christmas film written by and starring Aml Ameen in his directorial debut. The film also stars Aja Naomi King and Leigh-Anne Pinnock - the latter making her acting debut - and is notably the first British Christmas romcom with an almost entirely Black cast.

Situated primarily in London, the film follows Melvin Mckenzie (Aml Ameen) as he returns home to London after two years to launch his new book and introduce his fiancée to his family. Ameen created Boxing Day to represent his own experiences growing up in England with his own Caribbean-British family, drawing on commonly seen tropes from other famous Christmas movies, such as Love Actually.

== Plot ==
Melvin "Smelly" Mckenzie (Aml Ameen) is a British immigrant living in Los Angeles. After the release of his new book he is prompted to go back home to London for the first time in two years in order to promote his book.

Melvin and his American almost-fiancée Lisa Dixon (Aja Naomi King)- Melvin proposed to her but she threw up before she could explicitly respond- journey to London to meet his lovable but dysfunctional Caribbean-British family.

While there, things become complicated by the presence of Melvin's ex-girlfriend and global superstar Georgia (Leigh-Anne Pinnock) who still has unresolved feelings for him and is very close with the family he left behind.

At the hotel Lisa bumps into Georgia, neither one of them aware of their mutual lover. She fawns over the star, asking for a selfie which gets uploaded to Instagram, so Melvin's family see he's in town.

When Melvin is on the TV chat show promoting his book, none other than Georgia (Gigi) is the musical guest. They hadn't seen each other since his parents announced their divorce that fateful Boxing Day, as he disappeared to LA. His sister Boobsy is there as well, as she's Gigi's manager.

Directly afterwards in the hotel lobby, Melvin and Lisa are trying to leave so he can talk to his mom about Lisa before everyone else arrives. She sees Georgia, and tries to introduce her to her fiancé Melvin. Seeing each other from afar, trying to avoid each other, they inadvertently and literally bump into each other.

In the car on the way to his mum Shirley's, Lisa chews Melvin out for not telling her his ex is the famous singer. Simultaneously Gigi is pouring out her heart to Boobsy, detailing the fantasy scenario she'd built up in her mind about reconciling with Melvin.

At Shirley's, going through old photo albums, Lisa is shown that he and Gigi practically grew up together as their mums are best friends. Later, that night at Gigi's gig, Lisa realises that Gigi still has feelings for Melvin by the way she looks at him.

Lisa holds her own playing cards with the men of the family the next day. Gigi shows up with Boobsy, and the whole family is soon up and dancing together. There is a lot of tension between the two women, and when she sees the opportunity Gigi seeks out Melvin and kisses him. Lisa sees and leaves and when he follows, she announces she's accepting a job offer in New Zealand.

When Gigi also leaves upset, an argument breaks out over Melvin's leaving two years ago. As tempers flare, Boobsy starts a food fight. Amidst the chaos, Shirley finally arrives with Richard to finally introduce him, but is so upset with the mess she sends everyone off except for Melvin. Alone, she tells him Lisa's pregnant.

At the hotel, Lisa sends Melvin off. He goes to his dad's bar, where he's convinced he could handle being a dad. So he tries to do a grand gesture with cards similar to Love Actually, but it fails. Similarly his brother tries to do a grand gesture with his crush, also unsuccessfully.

At Shirley's Christmas pageant, Richard and she finally make their relationship public. Gigi goes to see Lisa at the hotel, then she and Boobsy lure Melvin down by Tower Bridge where he proposes to Lisa again.

== Cast ==
- Aml Ameen as Melvin Mckenzie, the main character. A British writer living in America who returns home to promote his new book. He is still hurt by his parents' divorce, which they announced at their family's annual Boxing Day party two years prior to the start of the movie. As a result, he seems to be obsessed with having a "perfect" relationship, which inevitably causes him to do things that mess up his own relationship.
- Aja Naomi King as Lisa Dixon, Melvin's current girlfriend and soon-to-be fiancée. She is a casting agent in Hollywood who has just gotten a big job opportunity and has also discovered that she is pregnant. She accompanies Melvin to London for the holidays to meet his family for the first time.
- Leigh-Anne Pinnock as Georgia "Gigi" Folorunsho, Melvin's ex-girlfriend and childhood sweetheart. She is of Nigerian descent through her father. She is a pop singer who has recently gone through a very public break-up. Georgia's family and Melvin's are very close and they celebrate Boxing Day together every year.
- Marianne Jean-Baptiste as Shirley Mckenzie, Melvin's mother. She divorced her husband two years ago after he cheated on her, and now has a new boyfriend that she is hesitant to bring around to meet her children.
- Tamara Lawrance as Aretha "Boobsy' Mckenzie, Melvin's sister. She is Georgia's assistant and best friend.
- Sheyi Cole as Joshua Mckenzie, Melvin's younger brother. He is in love with his cousin's ex-girlfriend and is trying to woo her.
- Stephen Dillane as Richard, Shirley's new boyfriend.
- Robbie Gee as Bilal, Melvin's father. He cheated on Shirley two years previously with a much younger woman, which has left him and Melvin having a strained relationship.
- Yasmin Monet Prince as Alison, the girl whom Josh is trying to woo and his cousin's ex.
- Samson Kayo as Joseph, Josh's cousin and the ex-boyfriend of Alison.
- Joshua Maloney as Jermaine, Melvin's other brother.
- Claire Skinner as Caroline, Georgia's mother.
- Lisa Davina Phillip as Valerie.
- Derek Ezenagu as Clint, Georgia's father.
- Martina Laird as Janet.
- Ricky Fearon as Kirk.
- Fraser James as Billy.
- Tim Ahern as Dave, Melvin's agent.
- Melvin Gregg as Ian "Gorgeous", Georgia's rapper ex-boyfriend who cheated on her very publicly.
- Zeze Millz as herself

== Soundtrack ==
Boxing Day has not yet officially released a soundtrack, but the movie score features solo performances by Leigh-Anne Pinnock as Georgia. She covers Dionne Warwick's "I Say a Little Prayer" and "For the Love of You" by The Isley Brothers. She also performs an original song that she co-wrote called "Woman".

== Production ==
Boxing Day was created by Aml Ameen in his directorial debut, loosely based on his own family. He co-wrote the script with Bruce Purnell. He originally planned to fund it himself to get it off the ground, but he met agents at Idris Elba's wedding who sent his script out to BFI and Film4. It is also Leigh-Anne Pinnock's acting debut. She joined the cast after being recommended to Ameen by Purnell. Ameen had been looking for someone who could sing, but was not familiar with Leigh-Anne or Little Mix at the time.

The film's production began in late summer of 2020. The movie was filmed on location in London for six weeks in November and December. They filmed during the COVID-19 lockdown in locations like South Bank, Carnaby Street, and The Jazz Café.

== Release ==
The trailer for Boxing Day dropped on 6 October 2021. It was debuted in cinemas in the UK and Ireland on 3 December 2021, and was released in the US on Amazon Prime on 17 December 2021.

It is the first British Christmas romantic comedy with an almost entirely Black cast.

== Reception ==
On the review aggregator website Rotten Tomatoes, 82% of 17 critics' reviews are positive, with an average rating of 6.1/10.

== See also ==
- List of Christmas films
- Boxing Day
- Love Actually
