= Al-Sweady Inquiry =

British public inquiry

The Al-Sweady Inquiry was a five-year public inquiry led by Thayne Forbes which investigated accusations of mistreatment of prisoners by the British Army following the Battle of Danny Boy. The enquiry commenced its investigations in 2009.

The inquiry cost nearly £25 million. The report was published in December 2014 and concluded that the allegations of torture and murder were "wholly without foundation and entirely the product of deliberate lies, reckless speculation and ingrained hostility", but that nine Iraqi detainees had been ill-treated.

Subsequently Leigh Day, one of the law firms involved, were referred to the Solicitors Disciplinary Tribunal to answer complaints about its handling of action brought by Iraqi detainees against the Ministry of Defence. Leigh Day were cleared of all charges by the Solicitors Disciplinary Tribunal, and this decision was upheld by the Court of Appeal in October 2018. Another, Public Interest Lawyers, later closed down.

The Inquiry was a major plot point of the 2021 BBC Two drama Danny Boy, starring Anthony Boyle and Toby Jones.
