= Paul Blackwell =

Paul Blackwell may refer to:

- Paul Blackwell (actor) (1954–2019), Australian actor
- Paul Blackwell (footballer) (born 1963), Welsh footballer
- Paul E. Blackwell (born 1941), United States Army general
