= Alex Dahl =

American novelist

Alexandria Bockfeldt Dahl (born 1982), known as Alex Dahl, is an American/Norwegian crime novelist who writes in the Nordic noir genre. Her works have been translated into twelve languages, and she was described by Norwegian newspaper Dagbladet in 2019 as a new star of Nordic noir literature.

== Background ==
She was born in Oslo to a Norwegian father and an American mother, and grew up in West End Oslo. She is a native speaker of both Norwegian and English. She studied Russian, German and international studies in Oslo and Moscow, before earning a creative writing degree from Bath Spa University and a management degree from the University of Bath. She lives in London.

== Work ==
Her first novel, Før jeg forlater deg (Before I Leave You), was published in Norwegian under the name Alexandra Bockfeldt in 2013.

In 2018, her first English-language novel, The Boy at the Door, was published by Penguin Random House. The book was one of the most widely sold e-books in England at the time and was described by The Times as one of "the best crime fiction" books published in 2018. It has been translated into ten languages.

In 2019, she published the novel The Heart Keeper.

In 2020, Dahl published Playdate.

== Adaptations ==
Her 2020 novel Playdate was adapted for a Disney+ television series The Stolen Girl, starring Holliday Grainger and Ambika Mod, airing from April 2025.

== Bibliography ==
- 2013 – Før jeg forlater deg, Juritzen Forlag
- 2018 – The Boy at the Door, Penguin Random House
- 2019 – The Heart Keeper, Penguin Random House
- 2020 – Playdate
