= Phil Shiner =

British former human rights lawyer (born 1956)

- Born: Philip Joseph Shiner; 25 December 1956 (age 69); Coventry, England
- Education: University of Birmingham (LLB); University of Warwick (LLM)
- Known for: Iraq Historic Allegations Team
- Children: 5

Philip Joseph Shiner (born 25 December 1956) is a disgraced British human rights solicitor and convicted criminal. He was struck off the roll of solicitors in England and Wales in 2017 and convicted of fraud in 2024 over misconduct relating to false abuse claims against British troops. He was Head of Strategic Litigation at Public Interest Lawyers (International) from 2014 until the firm's closure on 31 August 2016. He had previously been Principal at Public Interest Lawyers Ltd from 1999 to 2014.

== Early life and career ==
Shiner was brought up in Coventry, where he was educated at a Catholic comprehensive school. He later attended the University of Birmingham (LLB, 1978) and the University of Warwick (LLM, 1985). He was an honorary research fellow at the University of Warwick from 1999 to 2004, an honorary professor of law at London Metropolitan University from 2005 to 2013, and a visiting fellow at the London School of Economics from 2005 to 2013. In July 2012, the University of Kent awarded him an honorary doctorate of law, (archived at) which the university revoked in November 2017 following the findings of misconduct against him.

Shiner was named human rights lawyer of the year in 2004, an award given jointly by the human rights organisations Liberty and JUSTICE, for "his tremendous skill, tenacity and dedication to fighting for justice". In 2007, he was named the Law Society's solicitor of the year. From 2004 to 2014 he was a regular contributor to The Guardian newspaper. In 2024, Shiner's honours and awards were rescinded.

Shiner worked with Keir Starmer (now UK Prime Minister) on his book "The Iraq War and International Law" that publicised his persistent legal investigations into British troops The Iraq War and International Law.

== Misconduct findings ==
=== Background ===
Shiner had "led the pursuit of legal claims against British troops for their treatment of Iraqi detainees after the 2003 invasion". The law firm Public Interest Lawyers (PIL), of which he was the only director and the owner of 100% of its shares (and which subsequently closed down in August 2016), was "instrumental in passing on about 65% of the 3,392 allegations received by" the Iraq Historic Allegations Team (IHAT).

Early courtroom successes for him in the Baha Mousa case were followed by controversy about other allegations, "the most serious of which turned out to be wholly untrue". He claimed that "UK soldiers had captured, tortured and murdered innocent Iraqi civilians after the Battle of Danny Boy near Amara in 2004". In 2014, a report by the Al-Sweady Inquiry showed that the dead "had been members of the Mahdi army militia, who ambushed a British patrol and were killed in exchanges of gunfire. Shiner subsequently admitted paying an Iraqi middleman to find claimants, a practice that is in breach of professional standards".

=== Admissions and defence ===
Shiner was charged before the Solicitors Disciplinary Tribunal but did not attend its two-day hearing, after telling it in writing that "he was unwell and could not afford to pay for a defence lawyer". He "admitted eight allegations of acting without integrity, including that he made 'unsolicited direct approaches' to potential clients", and he also admitted "another allegation of acting recklessly". Andrew Tabachnik, prosecuting for the Solicitors Regulation Authority, said that "Shiner's defence to the dishonesty charges ... was effectively: 'I was not in full control of my mental faculties at this time and I didn't know right from wrong and what I am doing.'"

=== Findings against him ===
The tribunal found him "guilty of multiple professional misconduct charges, including dishonesty and lack of integrity". Twenty-two "misconduct charges ... were proved to the criminal standard of beyond reasonable doubt. Two other charges were left to lie on the file."

By February 2017, the Solicitors Disciplinary Tribunal struck him off the Roll of Solicitors and also ordered him to "pay for the full costs of the prosecution, starting with an interim downpayment of £250,000".

=== Criminal charges ===
In June 2022, Shiner was charged with three counts of fraud and entered a plea of Not Guilty. The charges related to claims made against British soldiers in Iraq. Shiner was alleged to have failed to disclose to the Legal Aid Agency that he had engaged in cold-calling to solicit cases and had paid referral fees to agents in Iraq. It was also alleged that he committed fraud by false representation by providing an ‘untrue and misleading’ response to a question from the Solicitors Regulation Authority. Shiner's trial was set for September 2024.

On 30 September 2024, Shiner pleaded guilty to three counts of fraud, and his sentencing was scheduled for December that year. On 10 December, he was sentenced to two years imprisonment, suspended for two years. The judge noted that Shiner had "breached the considerable trust reposed in solicitors" and was "thoroughly dishonest," although he accepted that Shiner did not personally benefit from the frauds.

The suspended sentence was met with criticism from war veterans, campaigners, and politicians who argued it was too lenient. Former Defence Secretary Ben Wallace stated that the sentence "does not reflect the seriousness of his offence, and is an insult to our veterans". Jonny Mercer, former veterans minister, described Shiner as a "modern-day traitor" who had "destroyed the lives of some of our finest veterans".

=== Other consequences ===
By the time Shiner was struck off in February 2017, IHAT "had fewer than 250 active investigations". About a week later Britain's Defence Secretary Michael Fallon announced that IHAT would soon be shut down, largely due to the exposing of Shiner's "dishonesty".

When welcoming the decision to strike him off, the chief executive of the Solicitors Regulation Authority, Paul Philip, stated:

His misconduct has caused real distress to soldiers, their families and to the families of Iraqi people who thought that their loved ones had been murdered or tortured. More than £30m of public funds were spent on investigating what proved to be false and dishonest allegations.

Shiner's disgrace also resulted in criticism by former army officers of Baroness Shami Chakrabarti, the Labour Party's shadow attorney general. Johnny Mercer MP, a retired Army captain, criticised her for "an almost child-like understanding of military operations" and for "trying to retrospectively apply European Human Rights Law to the battlefield". Richard Kemp a retired Army colonel accused Chakrabarti of being "one of [Shiner's] greatest supporters" before his downfall, and of "helping him lose his way" as a result of such support. She said that she had been saddened by Shiner's downfall and had said that, before apparently "losing his way", he had "given good service to the public" and "did some very good work that has been upheld by a judicial inquiry into, for example, the torture and killing of Baha Mousa in Iraq."

== Bankruptcy ==
Shiner declared himself bankrupt in March 2017, owing almost £7 million. In February 2018, the Insolvency Service (IS) found that Shiner had sold his own house to his family and put it into a trust that had allowed him to live there. He also sold two commercial properties for £550,000 each and transferred two £3,500 guitars into the family trust. The IS estimates they have recovered over £483,000 but must continue to work on locating another £6.5 million of Shiner's assets.

== In popular culture ==
Shiner was portrayed by Toby Jones in the 2021 BBC Two drama Danny Boy, which retold the story of the Al-Sweady Inquiry.
