= Anthony Boyle =

Irish actor (born 1994)

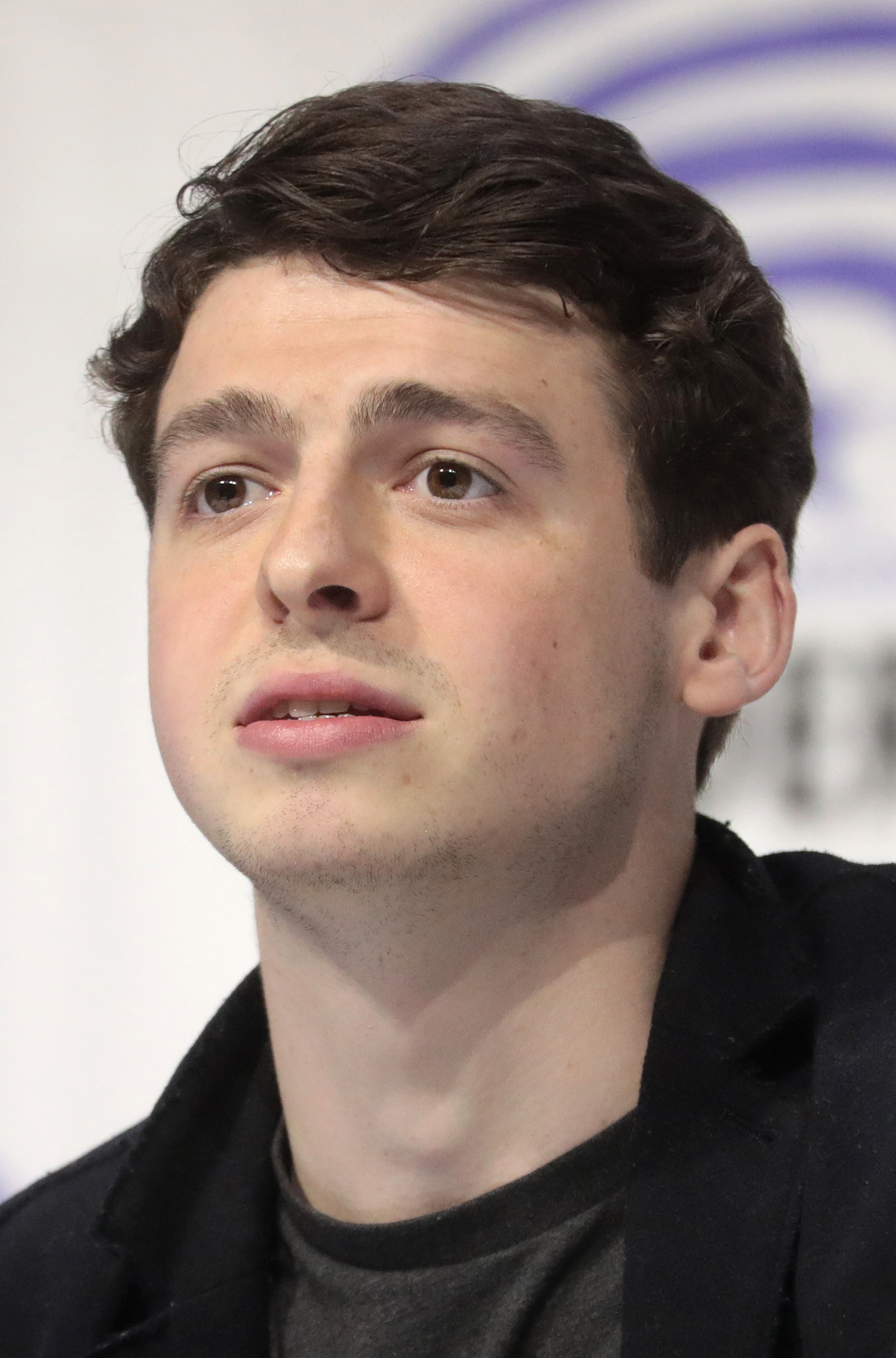
- Boyle in 2019
- Born: 8 June 1994 (age 32); Belfast, Northern Ireland
- Education: Royal Welsh College of Music and Drama
- Occupation: Actor
- Years active: 2012–present

Anthony Boyle (born 8 June 1994) is an Irish actor from Northern Ireland. A graduate of the Royal Welsh College of Music and Drama, Boyle began his acting career on the London stage. He rose to prominence for originating the role of Scorpius Malfoy in the West End and Broadway productions of the play Harry Potter and the Cursed Child (2016), for which he won the Laurence Olivier Award for Best Actor in a Supporting Role and was nominated for the Tony Award for Best Featured Actor in a Play.

Boyle appeared in the films Tolkien (2019), Tetris (2023), and I See Buildings Fall Like Lightning (2026), and the television series Masters of the Air (2024), Say Nothing (2024), and House of Guinness (2025–present).

== Life and career ==
Anthony Boyle was born on 8 June 1994 in west Belfast, and attended De La Salle College and St Louise's Comprehensive College. Due to a bone condition, he used a wheelchair for several years as a child. Boyle said this helped develop his acting skills, as he would improvise dialogue while watching other children play games without him. He was expelled from boys' school in Belfast at age 16, then attended Saint Louise's, an all girls school on the Falls Road, as one of 10 boys among 2000 girls. He took part in the school's drama department, taking on many different male parts and acting every day. He started his acting career in a series of what Boyle called “the worst productions you’ve ever seen”, including a version of Romeo and Juliet, alongside his fellow Belfast-born actor and longtime friend Lola Petticrew. In 2013, he began training at the Royal Welsh College of Music and Drama in Cardiff before graduating in 2016 with a BA in acting.

Boyle was familiar with the landscape and history depicted in Say Nothing, saying "the streets we were walking down were streets I’ve walked my whole life." His school was located on the Falls Road, just down the street from a mural of Brendan Hughes, whom he portrayed in the show. Co-star Lola Petticrew described Boyle as "one of [their] best friends in the world" since they were age 11. Boyle is also a longtime friend of Frank Blake, who portrayed Seamus Wright.

For his television role as Arthur Guinness in House of Guinness, Boyle did a full-frontal nude scene without prosthetics, a choice that he personally pitched to the director. Boyle stated that he did not find it daunting due to his previous experience with nudity in stage and film roles.

== Acting credits ==
Key
†	Denotes projects that have not yet been released

=== Film ===
Year	Title	Role	Notes
2012	Pillow Talk	Anto	Short film; also writer, co-director, and co-producer
2012	Splash Area	Mike	
2016	The Party	Mickey Magee	Short film
2016	The Journey	Young Ian Paisley	Cut from the film
2016	The Lost City of Z	Trench Runner	
2016	Onus	Keiran Flynn	
2017	Bad Drawings	Scott	Short film
2019	Tolkien	Geoffrey Bache Smith	
2023	Tetris	Kevin Maxwell	
2025	Animal Within	Tom D. Jennings	
2026	I See Buildings Fall Like Lightning	Patrick	
TBA	The Worst †	Danny	Post-production

=== Television ===
Year	Title	Role	Notes
2014	Game of Thrones	Bolton Guard	Episode: "The Laws of Gods and Men"
2017	Electric Dreams	Sam	Episode: "The Commuter"
2018	Derry Girls	David Donnelly	2 episodes
2018	Come Home	Liam Farrell	Television miniseries
2018	Patrick Melrose	Barry	Episode: "Never Mind"
2018	Ordeal by Innocence	Jack Argyll	Television miniseries
2020	The Plot Against America	Alvin Levin	Television miniseries
2021	Danny Boy	Brian Wood	Television film
2024	Masters of the Air	Major Harry Herbert Crosby	Television miniseries
2024	Manhunt	John Wilkes Booth	Television miniseries
2024	Shardlake	John "Jack" Barak	Television miniseries
2024	Say Nothing	Brendan Hughes	Television miniseries
2025–present	House of Guinness	Arthur Guinness	8 episodes
2026	The Altruists	Sam Bankman-Fried	Television miniseries
TBA	Close to Home †	Séan Maguire	Post-production
TBA	Charmer †	Ryan Hart	Filming

=== Theatre ===
Year	Title	Role	Theatre
2013	Herons	Aaron	Pintsized Productions
2014	Othello	Iago	Richard Burton Theatre Company
2015	The Taming of the Shrew	Biondello; Curtis; Merchant; Widow	Richard Burton Theatre Company
2015	In Arabia We'd All Be Kings	Skank	Richard Burton Theatre Company
2015	East Belfast Boy	Davey	Partisan Productions
2016	Mojo	Baby	Richard Burton Theatre Company
2016–2017	Harry Potter and the Cursed Child	Scorpius Malfoy	Palace Theatre
2018–2019	Harry Potter and the Cursed Child	Scorpius Malfoy	Lyric Theatre

=== Radio ===
Year	Title	Role	Notes
2015	Frankenstein	The Creature	RWCMD (with Big Finish Productions)
2016	The Tidebreak	Alfred Meyer	BBC Radio 3
2017	Mayday	Paul	BBC Radio 4

=== Music videos ===
Year	Title	Artist
2026	"The Blade"	Kingfishr

== Awards and nominations ==
Year	Award	Category	Work	Result	Ref.
2016	Evening Standard Theatre Awards	Emerging Talent Award	Harry Potter and the Cursed Child	Nominated	
2017	Critics' Circle Theatre Awards	Jack Tinker Award	Harry Potter and the Cursed Child	Won	
2017	WhatsOnStage Awards	Best Supporting Actor in a Play	Harry Potter and the Cursed Child	Won	
2017	Laurence Olivier Awards	Best Actor in a Supporting Role	Harry Potter and the Cursed Child	Won	
2017	The Stage Debut Awards	The Joe Allen Best West End Debut	Harry Potter and the Cursed Child	Nominated	
2018	Drama League Awards	Distinguished Performance	Harry Potter and the Cursed Child	Nominated	
2018	Outer Critics Circle Awards	Outstanding Featured Actor in a Play	Harry Potter and the Cursed Child	Nominated	
2018	Drama Desk Awards	Outstanding Featured Actor in a Play	Harry Potter and the Cursed Child	Nominated	
2018	Theatre World Awards	Honoree	Harry Potter and the Cursed Child	Honoured	
2018	Tony Awards	Best Featured Actor in a Play	Harry Potter and the Cursed Child	Nominated	
2025	IFTA Film & Drama Awards	Best Lead Actor – Drama	Say Nothing	Nominated	
2025	IFTA Film & Drama Awards	Best Supporting Actor – Drama	Masters of the Air	Nominated	
2025	IFTA Film & Drama Awards	Rising Star Award	Masters of the Air; Manhunt; Say Nothing	Won	
2026	IFTA Film & Drama Awards	Best Lead Actor – Drama	House of Guinness	Won	
2026	RTS Programme Awards	Leading Actor – Male	House of Guinness	Nominated	
2026	Rome Film Festival	Best Actor	I See Buildings Fall Like Lightning	Won (Note: Shared with Paolo Pierobon for Brianza)	
2026	GQ Men of the Year	Honouree	Himself	Honoured	
