= Thayne Forbes =

Sir John Thayne Forbes
- Born: 28 June 1938 (age 87); Isle of Wight, England
- Occupations: retired British judge and barrister
- Spouse: Celia Joan Elderton (m. 1960)
- Children: 3

Sir John Thayne Forbes (born 28 June 1938) is a British retired judge and barrister. As a High Court judge, he presided over the trial of Harold Shipman who was convicted of 15 murders in 2000 and subsequently sentenced to life imprisonment. Shipman is now recognised as one of the most prolific serial killers in history. He led the Al-Sweady Inquiry, a five-year public enquiry that reported in 2014.

== Early life ==
Forbes was born of Scottish parents on the Isle of Wight on 28 June 1938. He was educated at Winchester College, a public school in Winchester, Hampshire, and at Wolverton Grammar School, a co-educational state grammar school in Wolverton, Buckinghamshire. From 1957 to 1960, he studied law at University College London. He graduated with a Bachelor of Laws (LLB) degree and a Master of Laws (LLM) degree.

== Military service ==
From 1963 to 1966, Forbes served as an Instructor Lieutenant in the Royal Navy. On 2 December 1966, he was placed on the Emergency List for four years. This marked the end of military service and began the time period during which he was liable for call-up.

== Legal career ==
Forbes was called to the bar in 1966. In 1984, he was appointed Queen's Counsel (QC). On 13 March 1986, he was appointed a Recorder, a part-time judge.

On 5 June 1990, he was appointed a Circuit Judge. From 1990 to 1993, he was an Official Referee of the Technology and Construction Court. He was elected Bencher of the Inner Temple in 1991. On 24 May 1993, he was appointed a High Court Judge and was assigned to the Queen's Bench Division. He presided over the trial of Harold Shipman, a serial killer who was convicted 2000. Between 2001 and 2004, he was Presiding Judge of the Technology and Construction Court. He retired from the High Court in January 2009.

In 2009, the Al-Sweady Inquiry was set up to investigate allegations that British service personnel had murdered and ill-treated detainees in Iraq in 2004. On 25 November 2009, Forbes was appointed chairman of the public inquiry. The report was published in December 2014 and concluded that the allegations of torture and murder were untrue.

== Personal life ==
In 1960, Forbes married Celia Joan Elderton. Together they have one daughter and two sons.
