= Iraq Historic Allegations Team =

The Iraq Historic Allegations Team (IHAT) was a unit set up by the British government in March 2010 to investigate allegations of abuse and torture by British soldiers in Iraq. Many of these focused on three interrogation sites near Basra operated by the Joint Forward Interrogation Team (JFIT) between March 2003 and December 2008. The inquiry was established in November 2010 after 146 Iraqi men falsely claimed they had been tortured. IHAT was closed down on 30 June 2017; the only prosecution that resulted from its existence was that of Phil Shiner, the disgraced former lawyer who had made most of the allegations and was convicted of fraud on 30 September 2024.

The unit was led by retired senior civilian police detective, Mark Warwick, and was made up of Royal Navy Police officers and ex-civilian police detectives. In January 2013 G4S subsidiary G4S Policing Solutions lost its contract to provide 40 former police officers for the inquiry, and was replaced by Police Skills, a subsidiary of Red Snapper Group, who provided 100 former detectives.

In a judicial review the Court of Appeal ruled in November 2011 that the involvement of the General Police Duties branch of the Royal Military Police (RMP) "substantially compromised" the inquiry because members of the unit had participated in detentions in Iraq. The armed forces minister, Nick Harvey, responded by announcing in March 2012 that the RMP staff would be reassigned and replaced by Royal Navy Police personnel by 1 April 2012.

Lawyers representing people alleging that they have been tortured applied for another judicial review in May 2012 to examine the claim that the Royal Navy Police are not sufficiently independent since they also took part in interrogations, and that abuses were so systemic and widespread that only a public inquiry will satisfy the UK's human rights obligations.

The case started on 29 January 2013 and a judgement was handed down by Mr Justice Silber on 24 May 2013. In this judgement it was stated that IHAT had now been structured in such a way that it could independently carry out its investigative and prosecutorial functions. It also ruled that the decision of the Secretary of State to refuse to order an overarching public enquiry could not be called into question and said more should be done to address wider systemic issues.

In 2016 Martin Jerrold, managing director of the Red Snapper Group (RSG) was called as a witness to an oral evidence session by a parliament select committee. A subsequent Daily Telegraph article highlighted the profits made by the company which had contracts worth £4.8 million a year and its apparent ineffectiveness in that over its six years of existence it has yet to produce a single successful prosecution. Its 127 staff could be paid through limited companies potentially reducing tax. RSG confirmed all of its workers were inside IR35 and therefore made the correct levels of income tax and National Insurance returns. Furthermore Martin Jerrold provided evidence in the form of the engagement contract with the MOD which clearly set out RSG was contracted to provide agency workers. These workers worked under the direction, supervision and control of nominated MOD staff. RSG did not provide an operational service feature. They were for all intents and purposes the recruitment, training and HR function of the team.

In 2017, Defence Secretary Michael Fallon announced that the investigations would be shut down within months after MPs called it an "unmitigated failure." According to the Defence Committee report, IHAT had taken up over 3,500 allegations of abuse despite most not having any credible evidence. The report found failings in the conduct of investigations and concluded that those being investigated had suffered unacceptable stress, had their lives put on hold and careers damaged.

== International Criminal Court Criticism of IHAT ==
In 2020, the International Criminal Court (ICC) concluded a preliminary examination; IHAT, the UK’s primary mechanism for domestic accountability, was at the center of the ICC’s examination. The ICC found a reasonable basis to believe that British forces committed war crimes in Iraq, including unlawful killings, torture, rape, and other forms of inhuman treatment of both civilians and detainees, particularly between 2003 and 2009. The ICC emphasized that these crimes were not isolated but systematic and widespread, across multiple detention facilities under UK control. Additionally, it raised strong concerns about the credibility and independence of IHAT, which was at the center of the UK's domestic accountability framework. In its findings, the ICC stated that IHAT had:

- Failed to act independently, with investigators reporting to the Ministry of Defence, creating conflicts of interest.
- Lacked prosecutorial intent, having reviewed over 3,000 allegations without bringing a single prosecution to trial.
- Engaged in procedural delays and inefficiencies, which discouraged victim participation and eroded trust in the process.
- Operated without clear standards for independent, impartial justice, raising the possibility that it served to protect accused personnel rather than investigate them.
- Closed or suspended investigations based on government or institutional pressure rather than evidentiary review.
- Systematic use of Public Interest Immunity (PII) by UK authorities to withhold key evidence from investigators, which the ICC viewed as an obstacle to genuine accountability and a tactic that undermined the transparency of IHAT's work.

The ICC described these institutional flaws as “particularly troubling,” noting that they undermined the UK’s claim to have genuinely addressed the alleged crimes.

Several prominent human rights organizations echoed and expanded on the ICC’s critique:

- Amnesty International warned that the failure to prosecute sent a signal of de facto immunity for Western militaries operating abroad.
- Human Rights Watch criticized the UK government for showing little political will to hold perpetrators accountable.
- The European Center for Constitutional and Human Rights (ECCHR) stressed that the structural nature of the violations should have triggered more decisive international action.

Despite these concerns, the ICC declined to open a formal investigation. The decision was met with widespread criticism from civil society actors, who warned that it reinforced patterns of impunity and left survivors without justice.
