= Sky Max =

British entertainment television channel (2021-2026)

- Logo used from 2021 to 2026
- Broadcast area: United Kingdom; Guernsey; Isle of Man; Jersey; Republic of Ireland

Programming
- Picture format: 1080i HDTV (downscaled to 16:9 576i for the SDTV feed)

Ownership
- Owner: Sky Group (Comcast)
- Sister channels: List of Sky UK channels

History
- Launched: 1 September 2021; 5 years ago
- Replaced: Sky One
- Closed: 24 February 2026; 8 months ago
- Replaced by: Sky One

Availability (at time of closure)

Streaming media
- Sky Go: Watch live (UK and Ireland only)
- Now: Watch live (UK and Ireland only)
- Virgin TV Go: Watch live (UK only)
- Virgin TV Anywhere: Watch live (Ireland only)

Sky Max was a British pay television channel owned and operated by Sky Group, a subsidiary of Comcast. Launched on 1 September 2021, it previously broadcast British drama and unscripted series, including Brassic, COBRA, The Lazarus Project, A League of Their Own, and Rob & Romesh Vs, as well as acquired programming from the United States.

Sky Max was announced on 28 July 2021, along with Sky Showcase, to replace Sky One; the former flagship which had been on air for nearly 40 years. The majority of drama and unscripted programming previously shown on Sky One was moved to Sky Max, while most of Sky One's comedy series were transferred to Sky Comedy. Sky Max shut down alongside Sky Showcase on 24 February 2026 and was replaced by the relaunched Sky One channel.

== Programming at closure ==
The remaining shows listed below were still on the air at the time of Sky Max's closure in February 2026, with the majority of future series moved to Sky One.

- Mr. Bigstuff (2024–25)
- Never Mind the Buzzcocks (series 29–33; 2021–25) (Note: Revival series. Previously aired on BBC Two from 1996–2015.)
- Rob & Romesh Vs (series 4–8; 2022–26) (Note: Moved from Sky One)

Acquired programming

- From (series 3) (Note: Moved from Sky Sci-Fi)
- Hacks (series 3–4) (Note: Moved from Amazon Prime Video. Moved to Sky Atlantic for series 5.)
- The Paper (series 1)
- Ted (series 1)
- The Walking Dead: Daryl Dixon (series 1–3)
- The Walking Dead: Dead City (series 1–2)

== Former programming ==
=== Drama ===
- Wolfe (2021)
- COBRA (series 2–3; 2021–23)
- Temple (series 2; 2021)
- A Discovery of Witches (series 3; 2022)
- The Rising (2022)
- The Midwich Cuckoos (2022)
- The Lazarus Project (2022–23)
- A Town Called Malice (2023)

=== Comedy drama ===
- Brassic (series 3–7; 2021–25)
- Agatha Raisin (series 4; 2021–22) (Note: Moved from Sky One. Co-production with Acorn TV)
- Frayed (series 2; 2022) (Note: Moved from Sky One. Co-production with ABC TV)
- Funny Woman (2023–24)
- Then You Run (2023) (Note: Co-production with Sky Atlantic (Sky Deutschland))
- Small Town, Big Story (2025) (Note: Simulcast on Sky Atlantic.)

=== Unscripted ===
==== Game shows ====
- A League of Their Own (series 16–20; 2021–25)
- Rob Beckett's Smart TV (2024–25)

==== Reality ====
- Dating No Filter (series 2; 2022)
- Got, Got Need (2022)
- Player Pranks (2022)
- Hold The Front Page (2023–24)
- The Overlap On Tour (2023–24)
- Joe Lycett's United States Of Birmingham (2025)
- Big Zuu & AJ Tracey's Seriously Rich Flavours (2025)
- Romesh: Can't Knock the Hustle (2025)

==== Variety ====
- The Russell Howard Hour (series 5–6; 2021–22)
- The Deirdre O'Kane Show (2021)
- Fantasy Football League (series 7–8; 2022–24) (Note: Revival series. Previously aired on BBC Two from 1994–96 and ITV from 1998–2004)

=== Acquired programming ===
- Based on a True Story
- Bel-Air (series 2) (Note: Moved from Peacock UK)
- The Blacklist (series 9–10)
- Creature Commandos (series 1) (Note: Moved to HBO Max for series 2.)
- Evil (series 4) (Note: Moved from Alibi)
- Fantasy Island
- The Flash (series 7–9)
- The Flight Attendant (series 2)
- Last King of the Cross
- Legends of Tomorrow (series 6–7)
- The Lost Symbol
- Magnum P.I. (series 4–5)
- Manifest (series 3) (Note: Moved from Sky One. Moved to Netflix for series 4)
- NCIS: Los Angeles (series 13–14)
- NCIS: New Orleans (series 7)
- Peacemaker
- Poker Face
- Resident Alien (series 2–4)
- Revival
- SEAL Team (series 5–7)
- Supergirl (series 6)
- S.W.A.T. (series 5–8)
- Tales of the Walking Dead
- The Walking Dead: The Ones Who Live
- Warrior (series 3)

== Second-run programming ==
The majority of programming listed below previously aired on other Sky UK channels. The list includes both Sky originals and acquired programming.

- An Idiot Abroad
- Banshee
- Bliss
- Bulletproof
- Chucky
- Critical
- Curfew
- Delicious
- The Enfield Haunting
- Entourage
- Fear The Walking Dead (Note: Previously aired on Amazon Prime Video)
- The Five
- Grimm
- Hawaii Five-0
- Hooten & the Lady
- Intergalactic
- Jamestown
- Jett
- MacGyver
- Mad Dogs
- Merlin
- The Moaning of Life
- Mount Pleasant
- The Office
- Prodigal Son
- Stan Lee's Lucky Man
- Stargate Atlantis
- Stargate SG-1
- Stargate Universe
- Stella
- Strike Back
- The Walking Dead (Note: Previously aired on Fox UK (series 1–10) and Disney+ (series 11))
- Welcome to Wrexham (Note: Previously aired on Disney+)
- You, Me and the Apocalypse
