= Blácaire mac Gofraid =

King of Dublin
- 1st reign: 939–945
- Predecessor: Amlaíb mac Gofraid
- Successor: Amlaíb Cuarán
- 2nd reign: 947–948
- Predecessor: Amlaíb Cuarán
- Successor: Gofraid mac Sitriuc
- Died: 948
- Dynasty: Uí Ímair
- Father: Gofraid ua Ímair

Blácaire mac Gofraid (Old Norse: Blákári Guðrøðsson [ˈblɑːˌkɑːre ˈɡuðˌrøðsˌson]; died 948) was a Viking (Note: The definition as given by Downham is used here - Vikings were "people of Scandinavian culture who were active outside of Scandinavia".) leader who ruled Dublin in the 10th century. He succeeded his brother Amlaíb mac Gofraid as king in 939 after the latter left Dublin to rule Northumbria. In the early years of his reign Blácaire led raids on important Christian sites at Clonmacnoise and Armagh, but repeated attacks by the Irish of Leinster in 943 and 944 led to the sack of Dublin. A year later Blácaire was replaced as King of Dublin (perhaps because of his inability to defend the city) by his cousin Amlaíb Cuarán, who had succeeded Blácaire's brother in Northumbria in 941, but had been driven out in 944.

Amlaíb allied with Congalach Cnogba, overking of Brega and the Southern Uí Néill, one of those Irish kings who led the attack on Dublin in 944, and was possibly subject to him. They fought together against the Northern Uí Néill in 947, but they were defeated and the Dubliners suffered many casualties. That year Blácaire was able to regain the kingship from Amlaíb and reversed the alliance with Congalach. Vikings raided into Congalach's lands in 948, leading to a battle between the Dubliners and the Southern Uí Néill in which Blácaire was killed. With his rival dead, Amlaíb left for England to regain Northumbria and his brother Gofraid mac Sitriuc was made king in Dublin.

== Background ==
The main historical sources for this period are the Norse sagas and the Irish annals. Some of the annals, such as the Annals of Ulster, are believed to be contemporary accounts, whereas the sagas were written down at dates much later than the events they describe and are considered far less reliable. A few of the annals such as the Fragmentary Annals of Ireland and the Annals of the Four Masters were also compiled at later dates, in part from more contemporary material and in part from fragments of sagas. According to Downham, "apart from these additions [of saga fragments], Irish chronicles are considered by scholars to be largely accurate records, albeit partisan in their presentation of events".

== Biography ==
Blácaire first appears in the historical record in 940 when the Annals of Clonmacnoise record that following the departure of Amlaíb mac Gofraid for Northumbria in 939 Blácaire arrived in Dublin to take control there. Downham speculates that the departure of Amlaíb and Blácaire's cousin Amlaíb Cuarán (who succeeded Amlaíb in Northumbria in 941) may have emboldened the overkings of northern Leinster, leading them to challenge the Kingdom of Dublin's authority in the region. (Note: In Early Medieval Ireland an overking (ruiri or rí tuath in Old Irish) was a ruler who had three or four subject kings.) Blácaire next appears in 942 when he is described as leading a raid on Clonmacnoise, an important Christian site in Meath. (Note: The Chronicon Scotorum gives the alternative date of 941 for this raid.) The following year, Blácaire is recorded as leading a raid on Armagh, defeating an army of the Northern Uí Néill and killing their king Muirchertach mac Néill along the way at Ardee. That same year Lorcán mac Fáelán, overking of Leinster, led an attack on the Vikings at Dublin, and although he won a victory he was killed in the battle. In 944 Lorcán's successor Bran Fionn mac Máelmórda, allied with Congalach Cnogba, overking of Brega and the Southern Uí Néill, and made a follow-up attack on Dublin. The Vikings of Dublin were defeated and the settlement was sacked, although accounts differ as to the extent of the damage.

The year after the sacking Blácaire was expelled from Dublin and he was replaced as ruler there by his cousin Amlaíb Cuarán, perhaps as a consequence of his failure to protect the city. Amlaíb had succeeded Blácaire 's brother in Northumbria in 941, but was himself expelled from England in 944 by King Edmund I. Amlaíb allied with Congalach, and may have in fact been a client of him, and beginning in 945 they allied to fight against Ruaidrí ua Canannáin of the Cenél Conaill. The two sides fought a battle in 947 in which Ruaidrí was successful and the Vikings of Dublin suffered many casualties. Soon after this defeat Blácaire was able to regain Dublin and his rival Amlaíb was rendered powerless. In 948 Viking raids took place into the lands of Congalach in Brega and the territory of the Southern Uí Néill. A battle ensued and Blácaire was killed, with Congalach's forces killing or capturing a large number of the Dubliners. The death of Blácaire allowed Amlaíb Cuarán to return to power, and he quickly returned to England to claim the kingship of Northumbria, which had been recaptured by Vikings led by Eric Bloodaxe in 947. Amlaíb's brother Gofraid mac Sitriuc succeeded Blácaire as king in Dublin.

== Family ==
Blácaire's father is identifiable as Gofraid, who was king of Dublin between 921 and 934, and also briefly ruled Northumbria in 927. In the annals Gofraid is identified by the use of "ua Ímair", meaning "grandson of Ímar", but never with a patronymic. As such, it is not possible to identify which of the three known sons of Ímar (Bárid, Sichfrith or Sitriuc) – if any – was the father of Gofraid. Ímar, possibly identical to Ivar the Boneless, was the founder of the Uí Ímair and was one of the earliest kings of Dublin in the mid-ninth century. Three other individuals are identifiable as sons of Gofraid. Albann was killed in battle against Muirchertach mac Néill in 926. Amlaíb, King of Dublin and Northumbria, was another son, as was Ragnall mac Gofraid who ruled Northumbria in 943 and 944, probably along with his cousin Olaf Cuarán, until they were driven out by Edmund I of England.

=== Family tree ===
Family tree of the Uí Ímair

Ímar
Bárid	Sichfrith	Sitriuc	Unknown (Note: The parentage of Ímar's grandsons is unknown)
Uathmarán	Sitric Cáech	Ímar	Ragnall	Amlaíb	Gofraid
Sichfrith	Aralt	Sichfrith	Auisle	Gofraid	Amlaíb Cuarán	Mac Ragnaill	Ragnall	Blácaire	Amlaíb	Albann
Gofraid	Maccus	Ragnall	Glúniarran	Sitric Silkbeard	Aralt	Dubgall	Máel Muire	Ímar	Cammán	Gofraid

== Notes ==
Blácaire mac Gofraid House of Ivar
Regnal titles
Preceded by Amlaíb mac Gofraid	King of Dublin; 940–945	Succeeded by Amlaíb Cuarán
Preceded by Amlaíb Cuarán	King of Dublin; 947–948	Succeeded by Gofraid mac Sitriuc
