= Auisle =

"King of the Foreigners"
- Reign: c. 863–867
- Died: c. 867
- Issue: Mac Auisle
- Father: Gofraid

Auisle or Óisle (Old Norse: Ásl [ˈɑːsl] or Auðgísl [ˈɔuðˌɡiːsl]; died c. 867) was a Viking (Note: The definition as given by Downham is used here — Vikings are "people of Scandinavian culture who were active outside of Scandinavia".) leader in Ireland and Scotland in the mid-late ninth century. He was the son of the king of Lochlann, identified in the non-contemporary Fragmentary Annals of Ireland as Gofraid, and brother of Amlaíb Conung and Ímar, the latter of whom founded the Uí Ímair dynasty, and whose descendants would go on to dominate the Irish Sea region for several centuries. Another Viking leader, Halfdan Ragnarsson, is sometimes considered a brother. The Irish Annals title Auisle, Ímar and Amlaíb "kings of the foreigners". Modern scholars use the title "kings of Dublin" after the Viking settlement which formed the base of their power.

Auisle is mentioned three times in contemporary annals. In the first entry, dated 863, he and his brothers are recorded as having raided Brega, including underground tombs at Achad Aldai, Cnodba, and Dubad. The second, dated 866, records Auisle and Amlaíb raiding Pictland, taking away many hostages. In the final entry, dated 867, the death of Auisle at the hands of unnamed kinsmen is reported. According to the later Fragmentary Annals his brothers Amlaíb and Ímar plotted his death, with Amlaíb striking the killing blow.

== Background ==
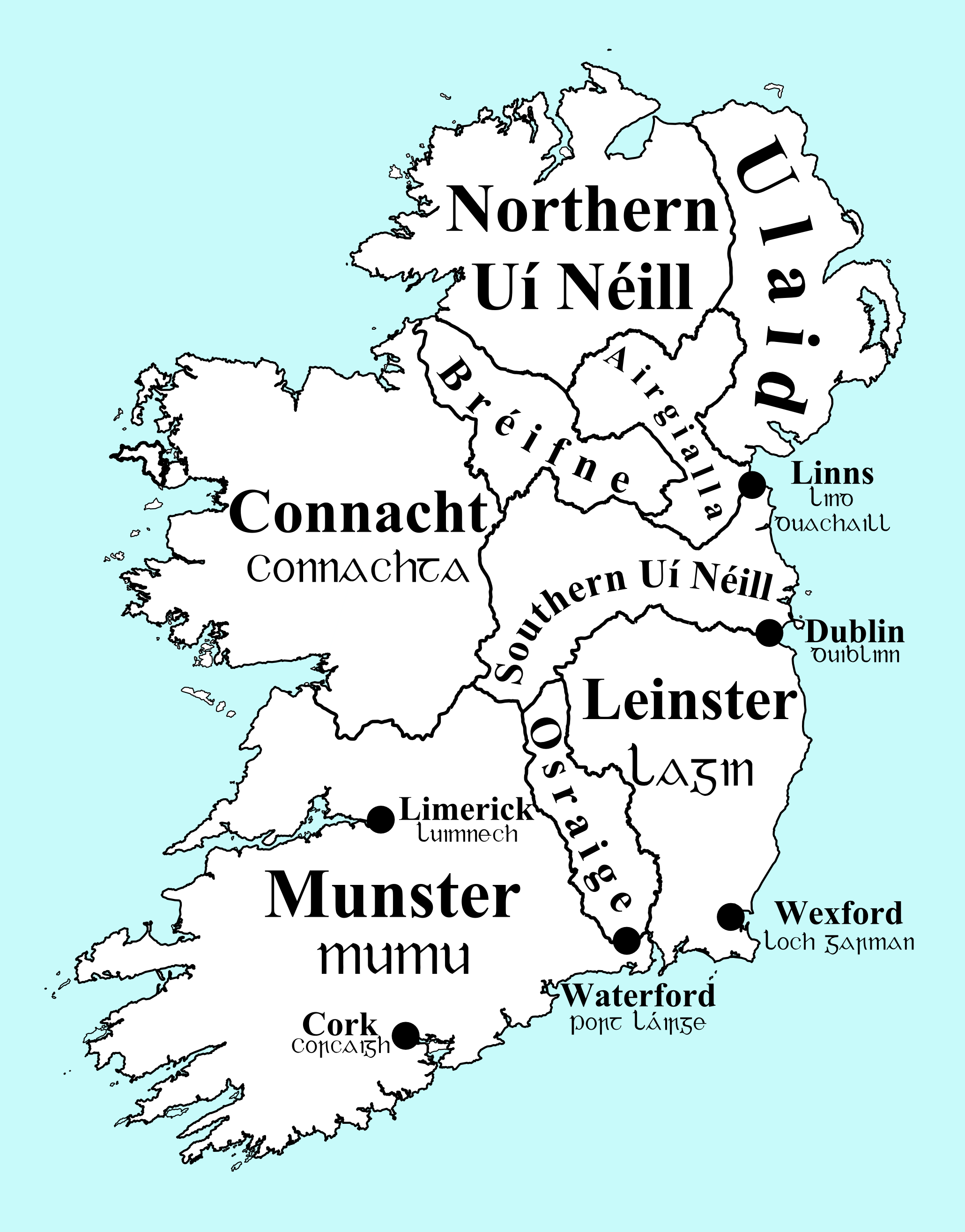
Ireland in the late ninth-century; the Viking settlements of Linns, Dublin, Wexford, Waterford, Cork and Limerick are marked

The earliest recorded Viking raids in Ireland occurred in 795. Over time, these raids increased in intensity, and they overwintered in Ireland for the first time in 840–841. Later in 841 a longphort was constructed at Áth Cliath (Irish for hurdled ford), a site which would later develop into the city of Dublin. Longphorts were also established at other sites around Ireland, some of which developed into larger Viking settlements over time. The Viking population in Ireland was boosted in 851 with the arrival of a large group known as "dark foreigners" – a contentious term usually considered to mean the newly arrived Vikings, as opposed to the "fair foreigners", i.e. the Viking population which was resident prior to this influx. (Note: Dubgaill and Finngaill respectively in Old Irish. Amlaíb and his kin are counted among the Dubgaill.) A kingdom in Viking Scotland was established by the mid ninth-century, and it exerted control over some of the Vikings in Ireland. By 853 a separate kingdom of Dublin had been set up which claimed control over all the Vikings in Ireland.

Auisle's brother Amlaíb arrived in Ireland in 853 according to the Annals of Ulster:

Amlaíb, son of the king of Lochlann, came to Ireland, and the foreigners of Ireland submitted to him, and he took tribute from the Irish.

Amlaíb is named in the annals as a "king of the foreigners", but in modern texts he is usually labelled the first king of Dublin, after the Viking settlement which was the base of his power. His brothers arrived in Ireland later, and they ruled together as co-kings. The Fragmentary Annals go into more detail regarding Amlaíb's arrival (Note: The Fragmentary Annals were written several hundred years after the events they describe, and are considered less reliable than earlier annals such as the Annals of Ulster which may have served, along with historically dubious sagas, as partial sources for the Fragmentary Annals.):

Also in this year, i.e. the sixth year of the reign of Máel Sechlainn, Amlaíb Conung, son of the king of Lochlann, came to Ireland, and he brought with him a proclamation of many tributes and taxes from his father, and he departed suddenly. Then his younger brother Ímar came after him to levy the same tribute. (Note: Ó Corrain dates this to 852–853.)

Lochlann, originally Laithlinn or Lothlend, the land where Amlaíb's father was king, is often identified with Norway, but it is not universally accepted that it had such a meaning in early times. Several historians have proposed instead that in early times, and certainly as late as the Battle of Clontarf in 1014, Laithlinn refers to the Norse and Norse-Gael lands in the Hebrides, the Isle of Man, the Northern Isles and parts of mainland Scotland. Whatever the original sense, by the twelfth century, when Magnus Barefoot undertook his expedition to the West, it had come to mean Norway.

== Biography ==
Auisle is first mentioned by the Irish Annals in 863:

The caves of Achad Aldai, and of Cnodba, and of Boadán's Mound above Dubad, and of Óengoba's wife, were searched by the foreigners—something which had never been done before. This was the occasion when three kings of the foreigners, i.e., Amlaíb and Ímar and Auisle, plundered the land of Flann son of Conaing; and Lorcán son of Cathal, king of Mide, was with them in this.

Prior to this raid, Auisle's brother Amlaíb had been involved in a protracted war with Máel Sechnaill, (Note: Some sources use the name "Máel Sechnaill" and some use "Máel Sechlainn" to refer to this person.) overking of the Southern Uí Néill, and a group of Vikings sometimes known as the Norse-Irish. (Note: "Norse-Irish" is a translation of the Old Irish term Gallgoídil (literally Foreigner-Gaels). The origins of this group are debated, but they are usually considered Vikings of mixed Gaelic and Scandinavian culture. They do not appear in the Irish Annals after 858, possibly because in later years mixed-ethnicity was the norm, rather than the exception.) Máel Sechnaill was the most powerful king in Ireland at the time and his lands lay close to the Viking settlement of Dublin. Máel Sechnaill died in 862, and his territory in Meath was split between two rulers, Lorcán mac Cathail and Conchobar mac Donnchada. The raids on various underground tombs in Brega mentioned by the annals in 863 were likely an attempt to increase the influence of the Vikings of Dublin. Muirecán mac Diarmata, overking of the Uí Dúnchada, was killed by Vikings in 863, probably by Auisle and his kin trying to expand into Leinster. (Note: Thirty years previously Muirecán and his kin had claimed to be overkings of Leinster, but by the time of his death the success of Máel Sechnaill in imposing his authority in Leinster, combined with debilitating Viking raids had reduced the territory ruled by Muirecán's dynasty to "Naas and the eastern plain of the River Liffey".)

Beginning around 864 the three brothers halted their campaigns of conquest in Ireland, and instead campaigned in Britain. Ímar disappears from the Irish Annals in 864, and does not reappear until 870. This has led some scholars to conclude he is identical to Ivar the Boneless, a Viking leader who was active in England during this period as a commander of the Great Heathen Army. In 866 Amlaíb and Auisle led a large army to Pictland and raided much of the country, taking away many hostages.

Auisle is mentioned for the third and final time by contemporary annals in 867. The Annals of Ulster relate his death:

Auisle, one of three kings of the heathens, was killed by his kinsmen in guile and parricide.

The Fragmentary Annals state explicitly that Amlaíb and Ímar were responsible for their brother's death:

The two brothers, Amlaíb and Ímar, went to consult about the matter of the young lad Óisle; although they had hidden reasons for killing him, they did not bring these up, but instead they brought up other causes for which they ought to kill him; and afterwards they decided to kill him.

When Amlaíb learned that the party of the brother he hated had arrived, what he did was to send trusted messengers for the strongest and most vigorous horsemen he had, that they might be in the house to meet Óisle. Then Óisle came, the handsomest and bravest man in the world at that time; now he came into his brother's house with few attendants, for he did not expect what he found there (i.e., to be killed). What he sought there, moreover, was something that he did not expect to get. First he asked that liberty of speech be given him. That was granted. This is what he said: ‘Brother,’ he said, ‘if your wife, i.e., the daughter of Cináed, does not love you, why not give her to me, and whatever you have lost by her, I shall give to you.’

When Amlaíb heard that, he was seized with great jealousy, and he drew his sword, and struck it into the head of Óisle, his brother, so that he killed him. After that all rose up to fight each other (i.e., the followers of the king, Amlaíb, and the followers of the brother who had been killed there); then there were trumpets and battle-cries on both sides. After that the camp of the slain brother was attacked, his followers having been slaughtered. There were many spoils in that camp.

== Family ==
Auisle's father is identified as Gofraid by the Fragmentary Annals. Auisle, Amlaíb, and Ímar are identified as "kings of the foreigners" by the Annals of Ulster in 863, and as brothers by the Fragmentary Annals:

The king had three sons: Amlaíb, Ímar, and Óisle. Óisle was the least of them in age, but he was the greatest in valor, for he outshone the Irish in casting javelins and in strength with spears. He outshone the Norwegians in strength with swords and in shooting arrows. His brothers loathed him greatly, and Amlaíb the most; the causes of the hatred are not told because of their length.

Some scholars identify Halfdan Ragnarsson as another brother. This identification is contingent upon Ímar being identical to Ivar the Boneless: Halfdan and Ivar are named as brothers in the Anglo-Saxon Chronicle. (Note: The identification of Ímar and Ivar as being one and the same is generally agreed upon.) (Note: Another unnamed brother is mentioned in the Anglo-Saxon Chronicle: "...the brother of Ingwar [Ivar] and Healfden [Halfdan] landed in Wessex, in Devonshire, with three and twenty ships, and there was he slain, and eight hundred men with him, and forty of his army. There also was taken the war-flag, which they called the raven.") According to the Annals of Ulster Amlaíb's son Oistin was slain in battle by "Albann" in 875. This figure is generally agreed to be Halfdan. If that is correct, then it may explain the reason for the conflict: it was a dynastic squabble for control of the kingdom. One potential problem is that according to Norse tradition Ivar and Halfdan were the sons of Ragnar Lodbrok, whereas Ímar and Amlaíb are named as sons of Gofraid in the Fragmentary Annals. However, the historicity of Ragnar is uncertain and the identification of Ragnar as the father of Ivar and Halfdan is not to be relied upon.

A figure called "mac Auisli" in the original Old Irish, mentioned by the Annals of Ulster in 883 may have been a son of Auisle. The entry in the annals reads:

Death of Auisle's son at the hands of Iergne's son and the daughter of Mael Sechnaill.

The much later Chronicon Scotorum says something similar, stating that it was Ottár son of Járnkné, possibly identical with Ottir Iarla, and Muirgel daughter of Máel Sechnaill mac Máele Ruanaid who arranged the killing, but no motive is given.

=== Family tree ===
Family tree of the early Uí Ímair

Gofraid
Amlaíb Conung	Ímar	Auisle	Albann
Oistin	Carlus	Bárid	Sichfrith	Sitriuc	Unknown (Note: The parentage of Ímar's grandsons is unknown)	Mac Auisle
Uathmarán	Amlaíb	Ímar	Ragnall	Sitric Cáech	Gofraid
