= Sitric Cáech =

Norse King of Dublin and King of York

King of the Fair Foreigners and the Dark Foreigners
- Reign: c. 927

King of Dublin
- Reign: 917–920
- Predecessor: Ímar ua Ímair
- Successor: Gofraid ua Ímair

King of Northumbria
- Reign: 921–927
- Predecessor: Ragnall ua Ímair
- Successor: Gofraid ua Ímair
- Died: 927
- Issue: Amlaíb Cuarán; Harald Sigtryggsson; Auisle; Gofraid; Sichfrith
- Dynasty: Uí Ímair

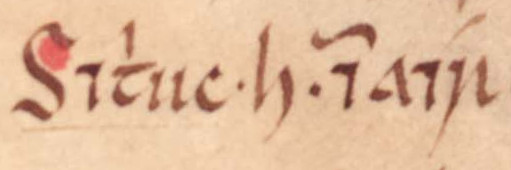
An excerpt from folio 29r of Oxford Bodleian Library MS Rawlinson B 489 (the Annals of Ulster). The excerpt concerns Sitriuc Cáech.

Sitric Cáech or Sihtric Cáech or Sigtrygg Gále, (Note: Name also spelled "Sitriuc". The epithet "Cáech" or "Cáoch" is variously translated as "the Squinty", "the One-Eyed", or "the Blind".) (Old Norse: Sigtryggr [ˈsiɣˌtryɡːz̠], Old English: Sihtric, died 927) was a Hiberno-Scandinavian Viking (Note: The definition as given by Downham is used here - Vikings were "people of Scandinavian culture who were active outside of Scandinavia".) leader who ruled Dublin and then Viking Northumbria in the early 10th century. He was a grandson of Ímar and a member of the Uí Ímair. Sitric was most probably among those Vikings expelled from Dublin in 902, whereafter he may have ruled territory in the eastern Danelaw in England. In 917, he and his kinsman Ragnall ua Ímair sailed separate fleets to Ireland where they won several battles against local kings. Sitric successfully recaptured Dublin and established himself as king, while Ragnall returned to England to become King of Northumbria. In 919, Sitric won a victory at the Battle of Islandbridge over a coalition of local Irish kings who aimed to expel the Uí Ímair from Ireland. Six Irish kings were killed in the battle, including Niall Glúndub, overking of the Northern Uí Néill and High King of Ireland. (Note: In Early Medieval Ireland an overking (ruiri or rí tuath in Old Irish) was a ruler who had three or four subject kings.)

In 920 Sitric left Dublin for Northumbria, with his kinsman Gofraid ua Ímair succeeding him as king in Dublin. That same year Sitric led a raid on Davenport, Cheshire, perhaps as an act of defiance against Edward the Elder, King of the Anglo-Saxons. In 921 Ragnall ua Ímair died, with Sitric succeeding him as King of Northumbria. Though there are no written accounts of conflict, numismatic evidence suggests there was a Viking reconquest of a large part of Mercia in the following few years. An agreement of some sort between the Vikings of Northumbria and the Anglo-Saxons was achieved in 926 when Sitric married a sister of Æthelstan, perhaps Edith of Polesworth. Sitric also converted to Christianity, though this did not last long and he soon reverted to paganism. He died in 927 and was succeeded by his kinsman Gofraid ua Ímair. Sitric's son Gofraid later reigned as king of Dublin, his son Aralt (Harald) as king of Limerick, and his son Amlaíb Cuarán as king of both Dublin and Northumbria.

== Background ==
The ruling Vikings of Dublin were expelled from the city in 902 by a joint force led by Máel Finnia mac Flannacán, overking of Brega and Cerball mac Muirecáin, overking of Leinster. Those Vikings that survived the capture of the city split into different groups; some went to France, some to England, and some to Wales. Archaeological evidence suggests Dublin remained occupied in the years immediately following this expulsion, perhaps indicating only the ruling elite were forced to leave. However, Viking raids on Irish settlements continued, and in 914, a large Viking fleet travelled to Waterford. The arrival of this fleet marked the re-establishment of Viking rule over parts of Ireland, and was followed by more Vikings settling in Limerick the following year.

The main historical sources for this period are the Norse sagas and the Irish annals. Some of the annals, such as the Annals of Ulster, are believed to be contemporary accounts, whereas the sagas were written down at dates much later than the events they describe and are considered far less reliable. A few of the annals such as the Fragmentary Annals of Ireland and the Annals of the Four Masters were also compiled at later dates, in part from more contemporary material and in part from fragments of sagas. According to Downham, "apart from these additions [of saga fragments], Irish chronicles are considered by scholars to be largely accurate records, albeit partisan in their presentation of events".

== Biography ==
The British Isles in the early tenth century

Sitric is presumed to have left Dublin with the rest of the ruling Vikings in 902. Coins dating from the period bearing the legend "Sitric Comes" (Earl Sitric), and the mintmark "Sceldfor" (Shelford), have been found as part of the Cuerdale Hoard, perhaps indicating that he ruled territory in the eastern Danelaw during his exile from Ireland. The Anglo-Saxons conquered all of the Danelaw south of the Humber by 918, but there is no mention of Earl Sitric in English sources, suggesting he was no longer ruling there at the time.

The earliest mention of Sitric in the Irish Annals is in 917 when he and Ragnall, another grandson of Ímar, are described as leading their fleets to Ireland. Sitric sailed his fleet to Cenn Fuait in Leinster, and Ragnall sailed his fleet to Waterford. Niall Glúndub, overking of the Northern Uí Néill, saw these Vikings as a threat, and he marched an army south to repel them. The Vikings fought against the men of the Uí Néill at Mag Femen in County Tipperary and claimed victory, though only through timely reinforcement by Ragnall and his army. This was followed by another at the Battle of Confey (also known as the Battle of Cenn Fuait), against Augaire mac Ailella, overking of Leinster, who died in the battle. Augaire's death marked the end of effective opposition to the Vikings' return to Ireland. Sitric led his men on a triumphant return to Dublin, where he established himself as king, while Ragnall returned to England and soon became King of Northumbria.

According to Downham, the departure of Ragnall and his contingent of warriors may have emboldened Niall Glúndub to try to expel the Uí Ímair from Ireland once again. In 919 Niall led a coalition of northern Irish kings south to Dublin. The forces of Sitric and Niall met near Islandbridge in modern-day County Dublin (dated 14 September by the Annals of Ulster). The resulting Battle of Islandbridge was an overwhelming victory for Sitric and his forces, with Niall falling in battle alongside one of his kinsmen. Five other kings, and a kinsman of the ruler of the Southern Uí Néill, also died fighting against Sitric's army. (Note: The five other kings were Áed mac Eochocáin of Ulster, Máel Mithig mac Flannacain of Brega, Mael Craibe mac Duibsinig of Airgíalla, Conchobar mac Flainn of Mide, and Cellach mac Fogartaig of South Brega.)

In 920 the Annals of Ulster report that Sitric left Dublin "through the power of God". Sitric travelled to Northumbria where he assumed the kingship of Northumbria, succeeding his kinsman Ragnall who died the following year. Sitric was followed as King of Dublin by his brother or cousin Gofraid ua Ímair. (Note: It seems that the three kinsmen Sitric, Ragnall and Gofraid co-operated for the greater good of their dynasty, with the senior of the three (initially Ragnall) getting the Kingdom of Northumbria and the next senior (initially Sitric) getting the relatively poorer Kingdom of Dublin.) In 920 Ragnall had submitted to Edward the Elder, King of the Anglo-Saxons. That same year, following his departure from Dublin, Sitric led a raid in Davenport, Cheshire, in violation of the terms of submission agreed between Ragnall and Edward. Smyth has suggested that this was an act of defiance by Sitric, indicating to Edward that he would not submit to him like Ragnall.

Neither the Anglo-Saxon Chronicle nor Æthelweard's Chronicon makes mention of Sitric in the years 921–924, between his installation as King of Northumbria and the death of Edward the Elder. However, there are coins in existence which were minted at Lincoln during the period that bear Sitric's name. These are an important piece of evidence since they suggest Sitric ruled a large area south of the Humber, a claim contradicted by the Anglo-Saxon Chronicle which says that all the 'Danes' in Mercia (i.e., south of the Humber) submitted to Edward in 918. These coins might indicate Viking reconquest of a large area in the years 921–924, which if it did happen went unremarked upon by the Chronicle. Edward's control of Mercia likely stretched the kingdom's resources to breaking point, allowing Sitric to exploit the ill-will towards Edward that existed among the populace there, with Edward being unable to effectively oppose Sitric. Downham suggests that the silence of the Chronicle might be due to Edward's failing power in the latter years of his reign, and its tendency to only record successes and not failures. His death in 924 is not recorded by a number of important Frankish, Welsh and Irish annals, suggesting a fall in importance and standing from the zenith of his power in 920.

Edward the Elder's successor, Æthelstan, met with Sitric at Tamworth in 926. The Chronicle does not mention the reason for the meeting, but it reports that an unnamed sister of Æthelstan was married to Sitric. Several years previously, in 918, Æthelstan's predecessor had used a royal marriage to bring Mercia under Wessex control. According to Smyth, the fact the marriage between Sitric and Æthelstan's sister occurred at the old Mercian royal centre at Tamworth reinforces the suggestion that this marriage was supposed to perform a function similar to the one in 918. The agreement reached at Tamworth seems to have necessitated Sitric's conversion to Christianity, though he soon reverted to paganism. Sitric died the following year and was succeeded by his kinsman Gofraid ua Ímair. The Annals of Ulster describe his death:

Sitric, grandson of Ímar, king of the dark foreigners and the fair foreigners, died at an immature age.

== Family ==
In the annals Sitric is sometimes identified by the use of one of his epithets, or by the use of "ua Ímair", meaning "grandson of Ímar", but never with a patronymic. As such, it is not possible to identify which of the three known sons of Ímar (Bárid, Sichfrith or Sitriuc) – if any – was the father of Sitric. One possible reason for the lack of a patronym might be that Sitric was the child of a son of Ímar who never ruled Dublin, or who spent most of his time outside Ireland, thus making Sitric's legitimacy to rule Dublin dependent on the identity of his grandfather, not his father. Another possibility is that Sitric was a grandson of Ímar through a daughter, again with his right to rule dependent on his grandfather. Sitric's kinsmen Ímar, Ragnall, Amlaíb and Gofraid are the other known grandsons of Ímar identified by the use of "ua Ímair". All except for Amlaíb ruled as either King of Dublin or King of Northumbria at one time or another.

The Annals of Clonmacnoise mention two sons of Sitric, Auisle and Sichfrith, falling at the Battle of Brunanburh in 937. Another son, Aralt, ruled as King of Limerick for an unknown length of time until his death in battle in 940. Sitric's son Amlaíb Cuarán (d. 981) reigned twice each as King of Dublin and King of Northumbria, and may have been the basis of the Middle English romance character Havelok the Dane. Gofraid (d. 951) may have been another son though his father is only named as "Sitric", leaving his relationship to Sitric ua Ímair unclear. Orkneyinga saga tells that a daughter of Sitric named Gytha was married to Olaf Tryggvason, King of Norway. According to Hudson, this is unlikely to be correct, since the marriage is said to have occurred sixty-three years after Sitric's death. It is much more likely that Gytha was actually a granddaughter of Sitric through his son Amlaíb Cuarán.

Sitric married an unnamed sister of Æthelstan in 926. Historians generally describe her as Æthelstan's only full sister, but Maggie Bailey points out that this rests on the late testimony of William of Malmesbury, and the Anglo-Saxon Chronicle makes no such distinction when recording her marriage to Sitric. William did not know her name, but traditions first recorded at Bury St Edmunds in the early twelfth century identify her as Saint Edith of Polesworth. The truth of his identification is debated, but regardless of her name it is likely that she entered a nunnery in widowhood. According to some late sources, such as the chronicler John of Wallingford, Amlaíb Cuarán was the son of Sitric and this West Saxon princess.

=== Family tree ===
Family tree of the Uí Ímair

Ímar
Bárid	Sichfrith	Sitriuc	Unknown (Note: The parentage of Ímar's grandsons is unknown)
Uathmarán	Sitric Cáech	Ímar	Ragnall	Amlaíb	Gofraid
Sichfrith	Aralt	Sichfrith	Auisle	Gofraid	Amlaíb Cuarán	Mac Ragnaill	Ragnall	Blácaire	Amlaíb	Albann
Gofraid	Maccus	Ragnall	Glúniarran	Sitric Silkbeard	Aralt	Dubgall	Máel Muire	Ímar	Cammán	Gofraid

== In popular culture ==
Sigtrygg appears as a character in The Saxon Stories, a series of historical novels by Bernard Cornwell. In the books he is portrayed as the brother of Ragnall ua Ímair, and he marries Stiorra, the daughter of the book's protagonist, Uhtred of Bebbanburg.

== Notes ==
Sitric Cáech House of Ivar
Regnal titles
Preceded by Ímar	King of Dublin; 917–920	Succeeded by Gofraid
Preceded by Ragnall	King of Northumbria; 921–927	Succeeded by Gofraid
