= Olaf of York =

Olaf of York may refer to:

- Olaf Gothfrith's son, i.e. Amlaíb mac Gofrith
- Olaf Sihtric's son, i.e. Amlaíb Cuaran
