= Glúniarann =

King of Dublin
- Predecessor: Sitriuc mac Ímair or Sichfrith Jarl
- Successor: Ímar ua Ímair
- Issue: Gluntradhna
- Dynasty: Uí Ímair (possibly)

Glúniarann (Old Norse: Járnkné [ˈjɑːrnˌkneː]; literally Iron-Knee) was a Viking leader who may have reigned as King of Dublin. It is speculated he may have been a member of the Uí Ímair.

== Biography ==
The Annals of Ulster mention Glúniarann for the first and only time in 895, describing him plundering Armagh with an army of Dubliners:

Ard Macha [Armagh] was plundered by the foreigners of Áth Cliath i.e. by Glún Iarainn, and they took away seven hundred and ten persons into captivity.

The Annals of the Four Masters are the only other annals which mention Glúniarann by name, describing the same event:

Ard Macha was plundered by Gluniarainn, and the foreigners of Ath Cliath; and they carried off seven hundred and ten persons into captivity, after having destroyed a part of the church, and broken the oratory; of which was said:

Pity, O Saint Patrick,
that thy prayers did not stay
The foreigners with their

axes when striking thy oratory.

Downham speculates that Glúniarann may have succeeded Sitriuc mac Ímair as King of Dublin. Throughout the 880s and 890s Dublin suffered through debilitating dynastic conflicts, resulting in the ambiguity as to who ruled. The annals do not mention Glúniarann's origins, but the name was later used by a member of the Uí Ímair, perhaps indicating a familial connection between Glúniarann and Ímar. Glúniarann's ultimate fate is unknown, but a man named Glúntradna mac Glúniarainn, likely a son, is mentioned by the annals. The Annals of the Four Masters describe Glúntradna 's death:

A slaughter was made of the foreigners by the Conailli, and by Athdeidh, son of Laighne, in which were slain Amhlaeibh, grandson of Imhar, and Gluntradhna, son of Gluniarainn, with eight hundred along with them.

The Chronicon Scotorum describes the same event, but adds no further information.
