= Jarnkne =

Járnkné may refer to:

- Glúniairn, a Norse-Gael king of Dublin of the Uí Ímair
- Glúniarann, a Viking leader who may have reigned as King of Dublin
