= Óláfr III =

Óláfr III, in Old Norse, may refer to the original-spelling names of:

- Amlaíb mac Gofraid (died 941)
- Olof Skötkonung III of Sweden (980–1022)
- Olaf III of Norway (c. 1050–1093)
