= Gyða =

Legendary British noblewoman (fl. 990s)

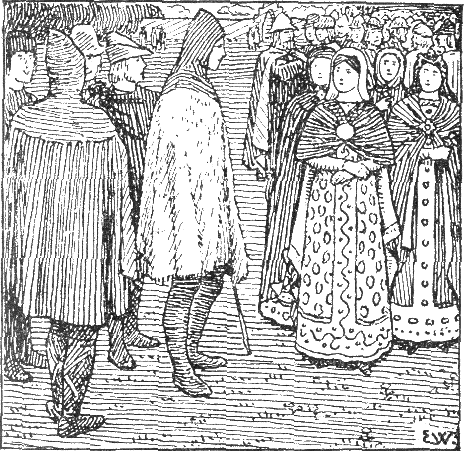
1899 illustration of Gyða meeting Óláfr Tryggvason in his bad weather gear.

Gyða was a legendary noblewoman from the British Isles who, according to Old Norse kings' sagas, selected Óláfr Tryggvason as a husband during his time in England in the 990s.

== In the sagas ==
According to Oddr Snorrason's Óláfs saga Tryggvasonar and Snorri Sturluson's Heimskringla, Gyða was the sister of Óláfr kvaran (Amlaíb Cuarán) of Ireland). She was a wealthy and landed widow. When a nobleman called Alpin/Alvini sought her in marriage, she called an assembly where she instead selected a disguised Óláfr Tryggvason as a husband. After he had defeated Alvini in single combat, they married and he subdued her lands for her before returning to Norway. In this account she was the second wife of Óláfr after Geira, but she disappears from the narrative by the time Óláfr courts Sigríðr the Haughty.

== Historical difficulties ==
The saga episode is difficult to reconcile with historical chronology. Óláfr Tryggvason was present in the British Isles in the 990s, at which time it is unlikely that Amlaíb Cuarán could have had a sister of marriageable age. It has been suggested that Gyða could instead have been a daughter of Amlaíb or a sister of Olof Skotkönung of Sweden. She does not appear in the earliest written sources about Óláfr, that is, the works of Theodoricus monachus. The sources are also inconsistent as to whether Gyða was from Ireland or England.

== Issue ==
According to the kings' sagas, Tryggvi the Pretender, who arrived in Norway in the 1030s, claimed to be the son of Óláfr Tryggvason and Gyða.
