= Amlaíb Cuarán =

King of Jórvík (Scandinavian Northumbria) from 941-944; King of Dublin from 945-947

Olaf
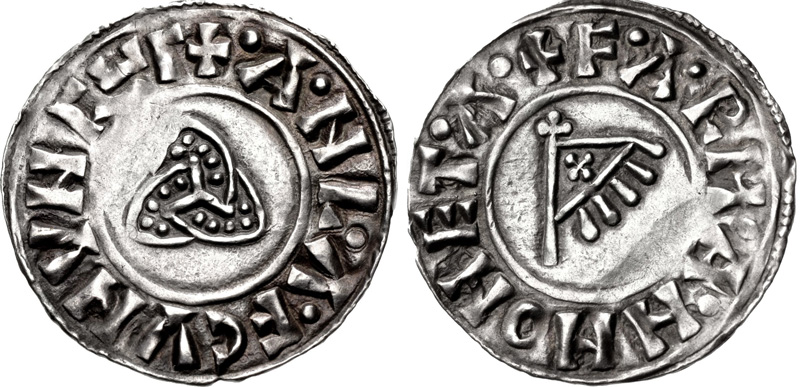
- Silver penny minted in York during the first reign of Amlaíb. Obv.: triquetra in the center with the Latin text '+ •A•NL•Λ•F CVNVNC ШΓ' encircling it; rev.: fringed triangular standard bearing ‘X’ on cross-tipped pole.

King of Northumbria
- Reign: 941 – 944
- Predecessor: Olaf Guthfrithson
- Successor: Edmund I
- Reign: 949 – 952 (second time)
- Predecessor: Eric Bloodaxe
- Successor: Eric Bloodaxe

King of Dublin
- Reign: 945 – 947
- Predecessor: Blácaire mac Gofrith
- Successor: Blácaire mac Gofrith
- Reign: 952 – 980 (second time)
- Predecessor: Gofraid mac Sitriuc
- Successor: Glúniairn
- Died: 980; Iona, Scotland
- Burial: Iona Abbey
- Spouses: Dúnlaith; Gormflaith
- Issue: Glúniairn; Sigtrygg Silkbeard; Gytha; Máel Muire; Harald
- Dynasty: Uí Ímair
- Father: Sitric Cáech
- Mother: Unknown

Amlaíb mac Sitric (d. 980; Old Norse: Óláfr Sigtryggsson [ˈoːˌlɑːvz̠ ˈsiɡˌtryɡːsˌson]), commonly called Amlaíb Cuarán (O.N.: Óláfr kváran [ˈkwɑːrɑn]), was a 10th-century Norse-Gael who was King of Northumbria and Dublin. His byname, cuarán, is usually translated as "sandal". His name appears in a variety of anglicized forms, including Olaf Cuaran, Anlaf Sihtricson and Olaf Sihtricson, particularly in relation to his short-lived rule in York. He was the last of the Uí Ímair to play a major part in the politics of the British Isles.

Amlaíb was twice, perhaps three times, ruler of Northumbria and twice ruler of Dublin and its dependencies. His reign over these territories spanned some forty years. He was a renowned warrior and a ruthless pillager of churches, but ended his days in retirement at Iona Abbey. Born when the Uí Ímair ruled over large areas of the British Isles, by his death the kingdom of Dublin was a minor power in Irish politics. At the same time, Dublin became a major centre of trade in Atlantic Europe and mastery over the city and its wealth became the supreme prize for ambitious Irish kings.

In death Amlaíb was the prototype for the Middle English romance character Havelok the Dane. In life he was a patron of Irish poets and Scandinavian skalds who wrote verses praising their paymaster. Amlaíb was married at least twice, and had many children who married into Irish and Scandinavian royal families. His descendants were kings in the Isle of Man and the Hebrides until the 13th century.

== Background ==
The earliest records of attacks by Vikings in Britain or Ireland are at the end of the eighth century. The monastery on Lindisfarne, in the kingdom of Northumbria, was sacked on 8 June 793, and the monastery of Iona in the kingdom of the Picts was attacked in 795 and 802. In Ireland Rathlin Island, off the north-east coast, was the target in 795, and so too was St Patrick's Island on the east coast in 798. Portland in the kingdom of Wessex in south-west Britain was attacked during the reign of King Beorhtric of Wessex (ruled from 786 to 802).

These raids continued in a sporadic fashion throughout the first quarter of the ninth century. During the second quarter of the century the frequency and size of raids increased and the first permanent Viking settlements (called longphorts in Ireland) appeared.

== Origins ==
The Ímar from whom the Uí Ímair were descended is generally presumed to be that Ímar (English pronunciation Ivar): "king of the Northmen of all Britain and Ireland", whose death is reported by the Annals of Ulster in 873. Whether this Ímar is to be identified with Ivar the Boneless, the leader of the Great Heathen Army, is rather less certain, although at the same time not unlikely.

Amlaíb Cuarán was probably a great-grandson of Ímar. There is no contemporary evidence setting out the descent from Ímar to his grandsons, but it may be that the grandsons of Ímar recorded between 896 and 934—Amlaíb Cuarán's father Sitriuc (d. 927), Ragnall (d. 921), Gofraid (d. 934), Ímar (d. 904) and Amlaíb (d. 896)—were brothers rather than cousins. Amlaíb's father Sitriuc first appears in the record in 917 when he seized Dublin, a settlement which had probably been under the control of an Irish king since the expulsion of the previous Viking rulers in 902.

Sitriuc ruled Northumbria until his death in 927. Manuscript D of the Anglo-Saxon Chronicle records his marriage to King Æthelstan's sister at Tamworth on 30 January 926. According to some late sources, such as the chronicler John of Wallingford, copying a lost northern record, Amlaíb was the son of Sitriuc and Æthelstan's sister, perhaps called Osgifu or Eadgyth. The historian Benjamin Hudson comments that "there is no obvious reason why the chronicle copied by John of Wallingford would fabricate this information, and the claim is supported by the historian Neil McGuigan. Sitriuc's other sons included Gofraid (died 951), king of Dublin, Aralt (died 940), ruler of Limerick, and, less certainly, Sichfrith and Auisle, listed among those killed at the battle of Brunanburh in 937 by the Annals of Clonmacnoise. A daughter of Sitriuc named Gytha is said in the Heimskringla to have married Norwegian pirate king Olaf Tryggvason, but she was probably a daughter of Amlaíb Cuarán.

Following Sitriuc's death, Amlaíb may have become king in York for a short time, but if he did it came to an end when Æthelstan took over the kingdom of Northumbria and defeated Sitriuc's brother Gofraid. According to William of Malmesbury, Amlaíb fled to Ireland while his uncle Gofraid made a second unsuccessful attempt to gain control of York. In 937 an attack on Æthelstan's kingdom by Gofraid's son Amlaíb, assisted by Constantín mac Áeda, the king of Alba, and Owen, the king of Strathclyde, ended in defeat at the battle of Brunanburh. William of Malmesbury wrote that Amlaíb was present at Brunanburh and spied out the English camp the night before the battle disguised as a skald.

King Æthelstan died in 939 and his successor, his half-brother Edmund, was unable to keep control of York. Amlaíb mac Gofrith, ruling in Dublin, crossed to Britain where he was accepted as king of the Northumbrians. He died in 941, shortly after sacking the church of Saint Baldred at Tyninghame, struck dead by the saint's power according to the Historia de Sancto Cuthberto. This traditional view of Amlaíb mac Gofrith's later career has recently been disputed by Kevin Halloran. The basic argument presented is that Amlaíb mac Gofrith did not rule in York and the suggestion that only one Amlaíb, Amlaíb Cuarán, was king there may explain some of the apparent anomalies in the numismatic record.

== York ==
Amlaíb Cuarán's career began in 941, following the death of his cousin Amlaíb mac Gofrith, when he became co-ruler of York, sharing power with his cousin Ragnall son of Gofraid. According to the Annals of Clonmacnoise, Amlaíb had been in Britain since 940, having left another son of Gofraid, Blácaire, as ruler of Dublin.

Amlaíb and Ragnall ruled in York until 944. The dating of events in the period between the death of Æthelstan and the expulsion of Amlaíb and Ragnall is uncertain as the various versions of the Anglo-Saxon Chronicle are in conflict. It appears that after Æthelstan's death, not only did Edmund lose control of Northumbria, but that the Five Burghs of the Mercian Danelaw also pledged themselves to Amlaíb mac Gofrith. One of the Amlaíbs stormed Tamworth according to the Anglo-Saxon Chronicle:

Here Olaf broke down Tamworth and a great slaughter fell on either side, and the Danes had the victory and led much war-booty away with them. Wulfrun was seized in the raid. Here King Edmund besieged King Olaf and Archbishop Wulfstan in Leicester, and he might have controlled them had they not escaped from the stronghold in the night.

It is not clear when in the period between 940 and 943 these events took place, and as a result historians disagree as to whether they concern Amlaíb mac Gofrith or Amlaíb Cuarán.

Edmund reconquered the Five Burghs in 942, an event celebrated in verse by the Anglo-Saxon Chronicle. The Chronicle reports the baptism of Amlaíb, with King Edmund becoming his godfather. This need not mean that Amlaíb was not already a Christian, nor would such a baptism have permanently committed him to Christianity, as such baptisms were often political acts. Alfred the Great, for example, had sponsored the confirmation of Christian Welsh king Anarawd ap Rhodri. Amlaíb was expelled from the kingship of York in 944. The Anglo-Saxon Chronicle reports that "King Edmund conquered all Northumbria and caused to flee away two kings [or "royally-born men"], Olaf and Rægnald". It is possible that rivalry between Amlaíb and Ragnall contributed to their fall. Æthelweard's history reports that Amlaíb was deposed by a coup led by Wulfstan, Archbishop of York, and an unnamed Mercian ealdorman.

== Congalach and Ruaidrí ==
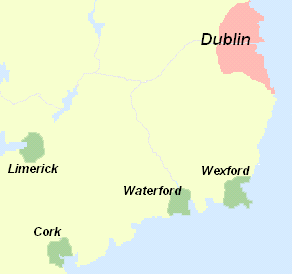
Scandinavian settlements in 10th century Ireland

After being driven out of Northumbria, Amlaíb returned to Ireland while Ragnall may have been killed at York. The Uí Ímair in Ireland had also suffered in 944 as Dublin was sacked that year by the High King of Ireland Congalach Cnogba, whose power base lay in Brega, north of Dublin on the lower reaches of the River Boyne. The following year, perhaps as a result of the sack of Dublin, Amlaíb's cousin Blácaire was driven out and Amlaíb replaced him as ruler of Dublin. Amlaíb was allied with Congalach and may have gained power with his assistance.

Congalach and Amlaíb fought against Ruaidrí ua Canannáin, a rival for the High Kingship who belonged to the Cenél Conaill, based in modern County Donegal. In 945 the two defeated part of Ruaidrí's army in Conaille Muirtheimne (modern County Louth) and the following year Amlaíb raided Kilcullen in the province of Leinster. In 947 Ruaidrí routed Congalach and Amlaíb at Slane. Losses among the Dublin men were heavy, with many drowning while fleeing the battle. This defeat appears to have lost Amlaíb his kingship, as the annals record that Blácaire, not Amlaíb, was the leader of the Dublin forces in the following year. Blácaire was killed in 948 by Congalach, and was succeeded by Amlaíb's brother Gofraid.

== York again ==
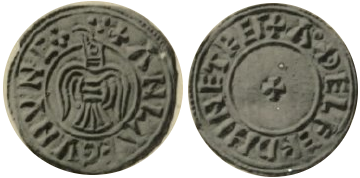
A second style of penny from York from Amlaíb's time, moneyer Æthelfrith, the obverse shows a bird, presumed to be a Raven, the reverse a cross.

The course of events in Northumbria while Amlaíb was in Ireland is uncertain. While Edmund certainly controlled Northumbria after Amlaíb was expelled and Ragnall killed, he may soon after have lost control of the north to a Scandinavian king named Eiríkr, usually identified with Eric Bloodaxe. If Erik did rule in Northumbria before Edmund's death, it was only for a short time. Edmund was killed in 946, and succeeded by his brother Eadred. The Anglo-Saxon Chronicle records that Eadred "reduced all the land of Northumbria to his control; and the Scots granted him oaths that they would do all that he wanted". The Northumbrian submission to Eadred led to a meeting with the notables of York led by Archbishop Wulfstan in 947, but the following year King Erik was back ruling Northumbria and Eadred laid waste to the southern parts of the kingdom— Ripon is mentioned as a particular target—to force the Northumbrians to expel Erik, which they did.

The following year, 949, by which time Blacáire was dead and Amlaíb's brother ruling in Dublin, the Northumbrians invited Amlaíb to rule in York. His return to England may have been with Eadred's agreement. That year Máel Coluim mac Domnaill, the king of Alba, raided Northumbria as far south as the River Tees, capturing many slaves and much loot. Whether this invasion was directed against Amlaíb, or perhaps intended to support him by plundering only northern Northumbria which may have been outside his control, is uncertain. A second invasion from the north in 952, this time an alliance including Máel Coluim's Scots and also Britons and Saxons, was defeated. Again, whether this was aimed against Amlaíb, who was deposed in 952 and replaced by Erik, or was mounted against King Erik in support of Amlaíb, is unclear. Erik's reign was short and the Viking kingdom of York was definitively incorporated into the kingdom of the English on his death in 954. Amlaíb returned to Ireland, never again to rule in York.

== From Dublin to Iona ==
In 951, while Amlaíb was in Britain his brother Gofraid died in Dublin of disease. Congalach's rival Ruaidrí was also dead, leaving Amlaíb's former ally as undisputed High King and thus a serious threat to Dublin and the south-eastern Irish kingdom of Leinster. This threat was perhaps what led to Congalach's death in an ambush at Dún Ailinne (modern County Kildare) or at Tech Guigenn in the region of the River Liffey while collecting tribute in Leinster in 956. The main beneficiary was the brother of Amlaíb's new wife Dúnflaith, Domnall ua Néill, who became the next High King of Ireland. The marriage linked Amlaíb not only to the northern Uí Néill kindred of Cenél nEógain, but also to the southern Clann Cholmáin as he was now stepfather to Dúnflaith's young son Máel Sechnaill mac Domnaill.

In the early 960s Amlaíb Cuarán probably faced a challenge from the sons of his cousin Amlaíb mac Gofrith. In 960 the Annals of Ulster report that Cammán, son of Amlaíb mac Gofrith, was defeated at an unidentifiable place named Dub. Two years later one Sitriuc Cam—Cam means crooked or twisted and Cammán is simply the hypocoristic form of this byname, so that Sitriuc Cam and Cammán are presumed to be the same person—was defeated by the Dubliners led by Amlaíb Cuarán and the Leinstermen while raiding in Leinster. Amlaíb Cuarán was wounded in the battle but Sitriuc fled to his ships. Sitriuc and his brothers appear to have raided Munster after this, but disappear from the record soon afterwards and do not appear to have returned to Ireland.

Amlaíb's activities in the early 960s seem largely to have been limited to occasional raids in Leinster. He attacked Kildare in 964, and it was a target again in 967 when Muiredach mac Faeláin, abbot of Kildare, a member of the Uí Dúnlainge kindred which ruled Leinster, was killed by Amlaíb and Cerball mac Lorcáin, a kinsman of Muiredach's. Another raid south in 964 ended in a heavy defeat for Amlaíb near Inistogue (modern County Kildare) at the hands of the Osraige.

Until the late 960s Domnall ua Néill, Congalach's successor as would-be High King, was occupied with enemies close to home, and in Connacht and Munster, and did not intervene in Leinster or the hinterlands of Dublin. Having defeated these, in 968 he marched south and plundered Leinster, killing several notables, and laid siege to Dublin for two months. While Domnall did not take the port, he carried off a great many cattle. Amlaíb, allied with the king of Leinster Murchad mac Finn, retaliated by attacking the abbey of Kells in 969. A pursuit by ua Néill's allies was defeated near Ardmulchan (County Meath).

In 970 Domnall ua Néill and his allies attacked Amlaíb's new-found ally, Congalach's son Domnall, the king of Brega. Domnall mac Congalaig was married to a daughter of Amlaíb, perhaps at about this time. Churches in Brega, including Monasterboice and Dunleer, guarded by Amlaíb's soldiers, were a particular target of the raids. Domnall of Brega and Amlaíb fought against Domnall ua Néill's northern army at Kilmona in modern County Westmeath. Domnall's army, which included allies from Ulaid, was defeated, and Ardgal mac Matudáin, king of Ulaid, and Cináed mac Crongilla, king of Conaille Muirtheimne, were among those killed. The battle at Kilmona did not end the war in the midlands. Monasterboice and Dunleer were burned after the battle and fighting spread to the lands of Clann Cholmáin the following year when Domnall ua Néill's enemies there drove him out, only for him to return with an army and ravage both Mide and the lands around Dublin before marching south to attack Leinster. This campaign appears to have established Domnall ua Néill as effective overlord of the midlands and Leinster for some years.

In 977, in unknown circumstances, Domnall ua Néill's sons Congalach and Muirchertach were killed and Amlaíb is given credit for their deaths by the annals. Domnall made no effort to avenge the deaths, retiring to the monastery at Armagh where he died in 980. The Dubliners campaigned against Leinster the late 970s. The overking of Leinster, Úgaire mac Túathail, was captured in 976. He was evidently ransomed or released as he was killed, along with Muiredach mac Riain of Uí Cheinnselaig of south Leinster, fighting against the Dubliners in 978 at Belan (County Kildare). Úgaire's successor Domnall Claen was little more fortunate, being captured by the Dubliners the following year.

Following the death of High King Domnall ua Néill, Amlaíb's stepson Máel Sechnaill mac Domnaill claimed the title. Amlaíb's former ally Domnall son of Congalach had died in 976, removing one potential rival, and as Amlaíb had killed two of Domnall ua Néill's sons he may have cleared the way for Máel Sechnaill to take power. If so, it was unlikely to be by design. Máel Sechnaill had become king of Mide and head of Clann Cholmáin in 975 and had inaugurated his reign with an attack on his stepfather when he burned "Thor's Wood" outside Dublin. In 980 Máel Sechnaill had the support of the Leinstermen when he faced Amlaíb's sons—Amlaíb himself was by now an old man—near the hill of Tara. The Dubliners too had allies as the Irish annals record the presence of warriors from the Isle of Man or the Hebrides. Amlaíb's son Ragnall (Rögnvaldr) was among the dead in the battle which followed, and although several kings fighting alongside Máel Sechnaill were killed, the result was clearly a crushing blow for Dublin. Máel Sechnaill occupied the city and imposed a heavy tribute on the citizens.

In the aftermath of this defeat Amlaíb abdicated, or was removed from power. He was replaced by a son named Glúniairn (Járnkné), a son of Dúnlaith and thus Máel Sechnaill's half-brother. Amlaíb retired to the monastery on Iona where he died soon afterwards.

== Marriages and children ==
He was succeeded by his son Glúniairn (Járnkné, literally "Iron Knee"), son of his wife Dúnlaith, daughter of Muirchertach mac Néill. Among his wives was Gormflaith, daughter of Murchad mac Finn, King of Leinster, and future wife of Brian Boru. Gormflaith's son Sitric Silkbeard was king of Dublin after Glúniairn's death. Amlaíb's other children included Gytha, who married Olaf Tryggvason, Máel Muire, who married Máel Sechnaill mac Domnaill, and Harald, possibly the grandfather of Godred Crovan.

== Cuarán ==
Amlaíb's byname, cuarán, is usually translated as "sandal" or "shoe". It derives from the Old Irish word cúar meaning bent or crooked. It is first applied to him in the report of the battle of Slane in 947 in the Annals of Ulster. The usual translation may be misleading. The epithet probably refers to a distinctive style of footwear. Benjamin Hudson points to the description of a cuarán in a twelfth-century satire, where it is made of leather folded seven times and has a pointed toe. In Aislinge Meic Con Glinne and Scél Baili Binnbérlaig, the cuarán is waterproof. In the first story Mac Con Glinne cleans his by dipping them in his bath; in the second, a cuarán serves as a vessel to drink from. That the cuarán was a piece of footwear specific to Dublin is suggested by statements in other stories that have cobblers in the town owing a cuarán in taxes.

== Icelandic sagas ==
Amlaíb Cuarán (Olaf Kvaran) is referred to at least twice in the Icelandic sagas, once in Njal's Saga and again in Saga of Gunnlaugr Serpent-Tongue. It is from these references that Einar Hjörleifsson Kvaran and his siblings chose the name "Kvaran" as their own.

== Notes ==
Regnal titles
Preceded by Olaf Guthfrithson (also known as Amlaíb mac Gofrith)	King of Northumbria; 941–944; With: Ragnall?	Succeeded by Ragnall or English control
Preceded by Blácaire mac Gofrith	King of Dublin; 945–947	Succeeded by Blácaire mac Gofrith
Preceded by English control?	King of Northumbria; 949–952	Succeeded by Erik Bloodaxe
Preceded by Gofraid mac Sitriuc	King of Dublin; 952–980	Succeeded by Glúniairn
