= Corpus of Electronic Texts =

- Producer: University College Cork (Ireland)
- History: 1992

Access
- Cost: Free

Coverage
- Disciplines: Irish history and culture
- Record depth: Index & full-text
- Geospatial coverage: Ireland
- No. of records: 1,601 (2016)

Links
- Website: celt.ucc.ie

The Corpus of Electronic Texts, or CELT, is an online database of contemporary and historical documents relating to Irish history and culture. As of 8 December 2016, CELT contained 1,601 documents, with a total of over 18 million words. In 1992, CELT originated from the ashes of an unsuccessful partnership between University College Cork (UCC/NUI) and the Royal Irish Academy (RIA) through a project named CURIA. According to CELT, the database "caters for academic scholars, teachers, students, and the general public, all over the world".
