= Gofraid mac Sitriuc =

Gofraid mac Sitriuc (died 951), in Old Norse Guðrøðr Sigtryggsson [ˈɡuðˌrøðz̠ ˈsiɣˌtryɡːsˌson], was King of Dublin. He was the son of Sihtric ua Ímair and a great-grandson of Ímar, founder of the Uí Ímair kindred which dominated much of the Norse-Gael and Scandinavianised parts of Britain and Ireland in the 10th century.

Gofraid became ruler of Dublin on the death of his cousin Blácaire mac Gofrith in a battle against Congalach mac Máel Mithig, the High King of Ireland, in 948. The men of Dublin suffered heavy losses in this battle, over a thousand being killed or captured.

An even bloodier defeat followed in 950 when Gofraid allied with Congalach against the would-be High King Ruaidrí ua Canannáin. Gofraid attacked Ruaidrí at an unidentified place called Móin Brocaín, somewhere between the River Boyne and the River Liffey, on 30 November 950. Although Ruaidrí and one of his sons were killed in the battle, Gofraid was heavily defeated and fled. The Annals of Ulster say that some two thousand of the Dublin force were killed, while other, less reliable Irish annals claim as many as six thousand. It may be that Congalach betrayed Gofraid, as some sources present him as the victor.

Gofraid's fortunes improved in 951. Raids from Dublin targeted the Abbey of Kells and other churches in the Irish midlands. The Annals of Ulster say that from Kells alone "three thousand men or more were taken captive and a great spoil of cattle and horses and gold and silver was taken away". The prisoners would be ransomed or sold into slavery, the cattle would feed Dublin as the city depended on importing mature beasts, and the rest would strengthen the city's defences.

Neither walls nor money nor soldiers were of any protection when, as the annals report, plague appeared in Dublin later in 951. This is described as leprosy and dysentery. According to the Chronicon Scotorum Gofraid was among the dead, and his death is reported as divine vengeance for the sacking of Kells.

Gofraid's brother Amlaíb Cuarán succeeded him as king in Dublin in 952.
