= Sichfrith mac Ímair =

King of Dublin
- Predecessor: Bárid
- Successor: Sitriuc mac Ímair
- Died: 888
- Dynasty: Uí Ímair
- Father: Ímar

Sichfrith mac Ímair (Old Norse: Sigfrøðr Ívarrsson [ˈsiɣˌfrøðz̠ ˈiːˌwɑrːsˌson]; died 888), also known as Sigfred Ivarsson and Sigfrodo, was a ninth-century King of Dublin. He was a son of Ímar and a member of the Uí Ímair.

== Biography ==
Sichfrith succeeded his brother Bárid as King of Dublin in 881. Bárid died in Dublin following a raid on the oratory of St Cianán at Duleek, present-day County Meath. He was supposedly killed through the saintly intervention of St Cianán himself.

During Sichfrith's reign there was conflict between two rival groups of Vikings; to the north were the "fair foreigners" who were allied with the Southern Uí Néill; to the south were the "dark foreigners". The meaning of these terms is contentious, but "fair foreigners" is usually taken to mean the Viking population which had been in Ireland the longest, as opposed to the relatively recently arrived "dark foreigners". Amlaíb, Auisle, Ímar, Halfdan, and their descendants, including Sichfrith, are usually considered the leaders of the "dark foreigners". The leader of the "fair foreigners" may have been Óttar, son of Iarnkné, who allied with Muirgel, a daughter of Máel Sechnaill, the king who had fought against Ímar and his brother Amlaíb. The "fair foreigners" had some success, killing an unnamed son of Auisle in 883.

Sichfrith was killed by a kinsman in 888. He was succeeded by his brother Sitriuc mac Ímair.

== Family ==
Sichfrith was a son of Ímar and had at least two brothers: Bárid, who preceded Sichfrith as King of Dublin, and Sitriuc, who succeeded him. Ímar is considered by some authorities to be identical to Ivar the Boneless, a Viking leader and a commander of the Great Heathen Army which invaded the Anglo-Saxon kingdoms of England in 865. According to legend he was one of the sons of Ragnar Lodbrok, and his brothers included Björn Ironside, Halfdan Ragnarsson, Sigurd Snake-in-the-Eye and Ubba. Ímar had at least five grandsons, Ragnall, Ímar, Sitric Cáech, Amlaíb, and Gofraid, but their parents are unidentified, so it is not possible to say which, if any, were the children of Sichfrith.
