= Ímar ua Ímair =

King of Dublin
- Died: 904; Strathearn
- Dynasty: Uí Ímair

Ímar ua Ímair (Old Norse: Ívarr [ˈiːˌwɑrː], died 904); also known as Ivar II, was a Norse-Gaelic King of Dublin. He was a grandson of Ivar Gudrødsson and a member of the powerful Uí Ímair. (Note: To avoid confusion the subject of this article is identified as Ímar ua Ímair throughout, and his grandfather simply as Ímar.)

== Biography ==
Ímar ua Ímair became King of Dublin sometime prior to 902, but probably not before 896 when his uncle (or father) Sitriuc mac Ímair died. In the decades before his reign, Dublin was weakened by internal strife and dynastic feuds. Neighboring Irish kings sought to exploit this weakness to expand their influence. Another motivating factor may have been revenge for Viking raids on Irish religious sites; in 890–891 alone, Norsemen plundered monasteries at Ardbraccan, Clonard, Donaghpatrick, Dulane, Glendalough and Kildare.

In 902 the kingdoms of Brega and Leinster formed an alliance and drove the Vikings from Dublin. The exiled Dubliners, led by Ímar ua Ímair, retreated to territory in Scotland over which they exerted some control. The following year they were engaged in warfare with Constantine, King of the Picts, raiding Dunkeld. (Note: Constantine is known as both King of the Picts and King of Alba, with his predecessors favouring the former title and his successors the latter.) A victory was won by Constantine the following year at a place identified by the Chronicle of the Kings of Alba as Strath Erenn. Ímar ua Ímair is mentioned in the Annals of Ulster in the same year for the first and only time. This sole entry details his death at the hands of the Picts of Fortriu – this is identified as the same battle as that mentioned in the Chronicle.

The Vikings did not return to Dublin until 917, when Sihtric, another grandson of Ímar, landed forces in Ireland, and inflicted a decisive defeat on the armies of Leinster.

== Family ==
There is some question as to whether the identifier "ua Ímair" refers to a literal grandson of Ímar, and it has been suggested it simply refers to a descendant, or even an individual of unknown descent. However, the fact "ua Ímair" is not seen in the Irish annals after 948 suggests it was solely used for literal grandsons.

Ímar had at least three sons, Bárid (d. 881), Sichfrith (d. 888), and Sitriuc (d. 896), all three of whom were kings of Dublin. Which of these sons, if any, was Ímar ua Ímair's father is not known. Other grandsons of Ímar have been identified as Ragnall, Sihtric Cáech, Amlaíb, and Gofraid, most of whom were kings in their own right.
