= Kingdom of Dublin =

Norse-Gael state on the eastern coast of Ireland from 853 to 1170

Kingdom of Dublin Dyflin Duibhlinn
- 853–1170
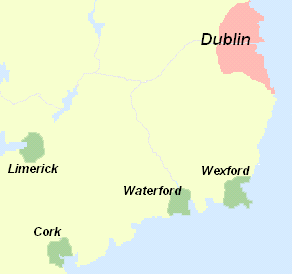
- Maximum extent of Dublin (pink) and other Norse settlements (green) in Ireland
- Capital: Dublin
- Common languages: Old Norse, Old and Middle Irish
- Religion: Norse paganism Roman Catholicism
- Government: Monarchy
- King
  - c. 853–871 (first): Amlaíb Conung
  - c. 1160–1170 (last): Ascall mac Ragnaill
- History
  - Established: 853
  - Norman conquest: 1170
- Currency: Silver penny
Preceded by	Succeeded by
Ciannachta; Cualu	Lordship of Ireland
- Today part of: Ireland

The Kingdom of Dublin (Dyflin) was a Norse kingdom in Ireland that lasted from roughly 853 AD to 1170 AD. It was the first and longest-lasting Norse kingdom in Ireland, founded by Vikings who invaded the territory around Dublin in the 9th century. Its territory corresponded to most of present-day County Dublin.

== History ==
The first reference to the Vikings comes from the Annals of Ulster and the first entry for 841 AD reads: "Pagans still on Lough Neagh". It is from this date onward that historians get references to ship fortresses or longphorts being established in Ireland. The Vikings may have first over-wintered in 840–841 AD. The actual location of the longphort of Dublin is still a hotly debated issue. Norse rulers of Dublin were often co-kings, and occasionally also Kings of Jórvík in what is now Yorkshire. Under their rule, Dublin became a significant port in trading slaves. The hinterland of Dublin in the Norse period was named in Old Norse: Dyflinnar skíði, lit. 'Dublinshire'.

Over time, the settlers in Dublin became increasingly Gaelicized. They began to exhibit a great deal of Gaelic and Norse cultural syncretism, and are often referred to as Norse-Gaels.

In 988, Máel Sechnaill mac Domnaill led the initial Gaelic conquest of Dublin. As a result, the founding of Dublin is counted by some from the year 988, although a village had existed on the site of Dublin nearly a thousand years earlier.

Coins were minted in Dublin by about 995, and on Mann by about 1025.

In the mid-11th century, the Kingdom of Leinster began exerting influence over Dublin. The last king of Dublin was killed by the Norman conquerors of Dublin in 1171.

== Geography ==
The extent of the kingdom varied, but in peaceful times it extended roughly as far as Wicklow (Wykinglo) in the south, Glen Ding near Blessington, Leixlip (Lax Hlaup) west of Dublin, and Skerries, County Dublin (Skere) to the north. The Fingal area north of Dublin was named after the Norse who lived there.

== Kings of Dublin ==
Ruler	Irish name	Reign	Notes
Óláfr hvíti	Amlaíb Conung	c. 853–871	Co-king; titled "King of the Foreigners" in 863
Ívarr	Ímar	c. 857–873	Co-king; titled "King of the Foreigners" in 863; titled "King of the Northmen of all Ireland and Britain" in 873
Auðgísl	Auisle	c. 863–867	Co-king; titled "King of the Foreigners" in 863
Eysteinn Óláfsson*	Oistin mac Amlaíb	873–875	Probable co-king; not explicitly named as king in the annals
Bárðr Ivarsson	Bárid mac Ímair	873–881	Probable co-king; titled "head of the Northmen" in 881
Halfdan Ragnarsson^	Albann	875–877	Claimed Dublin but never ruled
Sigfrøðr Ívarrsson	Sichfrith mac Ímair	881–888	
Sigtryggr Ívarrsson	Sitriuc mac Ímair	888–893/896	Rulership disputed by Sigtryggr Jarl in 893
Sigfrøðr Jarl^		893-?	Claimed Dublin in 893 but unclear if ever ruled
Iárnkné*	Glúniarann	?	Not explicitly named as king in the annals; speculated to have succeeded Sitriuc
Ívarr II	Ímar ua Ímair	?-902	Driven from Dublin in 902 by native Irish
Dublin abandoned by the Norse from 902 to 917.
Sigtryggr	Sihtric ua Ímair alias Sihtric Cáech	917–921	defeated Niall Glundub; also king of York
Guðrøðr Sigtryggsson		921–934	grandson of Ímar
Olaf Guthfrithson	Amlaíb mac Gofraid	934–941	son of Gofraid ua Ímair
Blákári Guðrøðsson	Blácaire mac Gofrith	941–945	
Sigtrygg (Sitric)		941–943	
Óláfr kváran	Amlaíb Cuarán	945–947	
Blákári Guðrøðsson	Blácaire mac Gofrith	947–948	restored
Guðrøðr Sigtryggsson	Gofraid mac Sitriuc	948–951	
Óláfr kváran	Amlaíb Cuarán	952–980	restored
Iárnkné	Glúniairn	980–989	
Ivar of Waterford or Sigtrygg Silkbeard	Ímar / Sitric	989–993	
Ivar of Waterford	Ímar	994–995	
Sigtrygg Silkbeard Olafsson	Sitric	995–1036	
Margaðr Rögnvaldsson	Echmarcach mac Ragnaill	1036–1038	
Ívar Haraldsson	Ímar mac Arailt	1038–1046	
Margaðr Rögnvaldsson	Echmarcach mac Ragnaill	1046–1052	
Murchad mac Diarmata		1052–1070	
Diarmait mac Mail na mBo		1070–1072	
Toirdelbach Ua Briain		1072	Member of the Uí Briain; seized overlordship of Dublin following Diarmait's death; given kingship by the Dubliners in 1072; allowed Dublin to be locally ruled by Guðrøð Olafsson under his overlordship.
Guðrøð Olafsson	Gofraid mac Amlaíb meic Ragnaill	1072–1075	Member of the Meic Ragnaill (Uí Ímair); ruled under the overlordship of Toirdelbach; expelled from kingship by Toirdelbach in 1075; possibly identical to Gofraid mac Sitriuc, King of the Isles (died 1070).
Domnall mac Murchada		1075	Member of the Meic Murchada (Uí Chennselaig); gained kingship following the expulsion of Gofraid mac Amlaíb meic Ragnaill; may have seized Dublin without the consent of the Uí Briain, or else ruled under their overlordship; died within the year.
Muirchertach Ua Briain		1075–1086	Member of the Uí Briain; installed king by his father, Toirdelbach.
Donnchad mac Domnaill Remair		1086–1089	Member of the Uí Cheinnselaig; seized kingship following death of Toirdelbach; killed in 1089; control of Dublin appears to have been gained by Muirchertach not long afterwards.
Guðröður Crovan	Gofraid Crobán	c. 1091–1094	Possibly a close relative of Ímar mac Arailt and thus a member of the Uí Ímair; founder of the Crovan dynasty; ruler of the Isles; seized kingship in about 1091 and expulsed by Muirchertach in 1094.
Domnall mac Taidc			Member of the Meic Taidc (Uí Briain); possibly installed king by his uncle, Muirchertach, after Gofraid Crobán's expulsion; certainly installed as ruler of the Isles at about this time.
Domnall Gerrlámhach			Member of the Uí Briain; possibly installed king by his father, Muirchertach, after Godred Crovan's expulsion; certainly held kingship at a later date.
Magnús berfœttr		1102–1103	Ruler of Norway; appears to have seized Dublin in the early twelfth century, having taken Orkney and the Isles before the turn of the century; seems to have intended for his son, Sigurðr, to rule as king of these newly won overseas Norse territories.
Domnall Gerrlámhach			Defended Dublin from Leinster attack in 1115; possibly installed king by his father long before battle, immediately before, or immediately afterwards.
Diarmait mac Énna meic Murchada		×1117.	Member of the Meic Murchada (Uí Chennselaig); died 1117.
Domnall Gerrlámhach		1117–1118	Seized kingship after Diarmait 's death.
Toirdelbach Ua Conchobair		×1118	Member of the Uí Conchobair; drove Domnall Gerrlámhach from kingship.
Énna Mac Murchada		×1122–1126	Member of the Meic Murchada (Uí Chennselaig); either seized kingship or was installed king by Toirdelbach; reigned under Uí Conchobair overlordship.
Conchobar Ua Conchobair		1126–1127	Member of the Uí Conchobair; installed king by his father, Toirdelbach; deposed in 1126.
Conchobar Ua Briain		1141–1142	Member of the Uí Briain; gained kingship in 1141; died in 1142.
Óttar of Dublin	Ottar mac meic Ottair	1142–1148	Member of the Meic Ottair; gained kingship in 1142; slain by the Meic Torcaill in 1148; may not have reigned continuously from 1142 to 1148.
Ragnvald Þorkellsson	Ragnall mac Torcaill	1144×1146	Member of the Meic Torcaill; styled king on his death in 1146, which could be evidence that his reign interrupted that of Ottar; another possibility is that he was merely a subordinate of Ottar.
Brodar Þorkellsson	Brodar mac Torcaill	×1160	Member of the Meic Torcaill; killed in 1160.
Guðrøð Olafsson	Gofraid mac Amlaíb	1150s or 1160s	Member of the Crovan dynasty; ruler of the Isles; held kingship of Dublin briefly at the behest of the Dubliners, although the chronology of his short reign is uncertain.
Hasculf Þorkellsson	Ascall mac Ragnaill	×1170	Member of the Meic Torcaill; deposed in 1170; killed attempting to regain kingship in 1171.

^ Disputed * Speculative

== See also ==
- Early Scandinavian Dublin
- Irish nobility
- The Pale
- Uí Ímair
