= Cammán mac Amlaíb =

Norse-Gaelic viking

Cammán mac Amlaíb was a Norse-Gaelic viking who is recorded in the Irish annals as being defeated in 960. He has been identified as being a son of Amlaíb mac Gofraid (d.941), as well as possibly being Sitriuc Cam, who was defeated in battle by Amlaíb Cuarán two years later.

== Cammán ==
In 960, Cammán is recorded in the Annals of Ulster as being defeated at a place named Dub. (Note: "Camán son of Amlaíb son of Gothfrith was defeated at Dub".) Cammán's opponent in the battle is not mentioned, and according to Clare Downham, the placename Dub seems incomplete, since there are many places in Ireland with this Gaelic element (which means "dark"). Several locations have been suggested. For example: Edmund Hogan identified it with Black River, in Rosclougher, County Leitrim; and Diarmuid Ó Murchadha identified it with the Munster Blackwater.

Downham identified Cammán as a son of Amlaíb mac Gofraid (d.941).

Downham noted that Cammán's name is Gaelic, and that Colmán Etchingham suggested that his name may be a diminutive form of the Gaelic camm, which means "crooked". Downham stated that Cammán, therefore, may be identical to Sitriuc Cam, who is recorded in the annals around the same time.

== Sitriuc Cam ==
Sitriuc Cam is recorded in the Annals of the Four Masters to have attacked Uí Cholgain from the sea, was defeated by the Amlaíb Cuarán with the Dubliners and a party of Leinstermen, and escaped to his ships following the slaughter of his people. (Note: "A prey by Sitric Cam from the sea to Ui-Colgain; but he was over-taken by Amhlaeibh, with the foreigners of Ath-cliath, and the Leinstermen; in the conflict Amhlaeibh was wounded through his thigh with an arrow, and escaped to his ships, after the slaughter of his people".) Uí Cholgain occupied the territory around Lusk, County Dublin.

== One of the sons of Amlaíb ==
Downham identified Cammán/Sitriuc Cam as one of the sons of Amlaíb, who raided the northern coasts of Dublin in 962. (Note: "The fleet of the son of Amhlaeibh and of the Ladgmanns came to Ireland, and plundered Conaille and Edar, with Inis-mac-Neasain; and the Ladgmanns afterwards went to the men of Munster, to avenge their brother, i.e. Oin, so that they plundered Inis-Doimhle and Ui-Liathain, and robbed Lis-mor and Corcach, and did many other evils. They afterwards went into Ui-Liathain, where they were overtaken by Maelcluiche Ua Maeleitinn, who made a slaughter of them, i.e. killing three hundred and sixty-five, so that there escaped not one of them but the crews of three ships".) The Annals of the Four Masters record the presence of Lagmainn ("lawmen") on the excursions of the sons of Amlaíb. It has been proposed that the use of these officials shows that Amlaíb's sons had contacts in the Isles. The sons are also recorded as raiding North Wales around this time period—Lyn and Holyhead were struck in 961, and Anglesey was raided in 962.
