= Sitriuc mac Ímair =

King of Dublin
- Predecessor: Sichfrith mac Ímair
- Successor: Glúniarann (possibly)
- Died: 896
- Dynasty: Uí Ímair
- Father: Ímar

Sihtric mac Ímair (Old Norse: Sigtryggr Ívarrsson [ˈsiɣˌtryɡːz̠ ˈiːˌwɑrːsˌson]; died 896) was a ninth-century viking King of Dublin. He was a son of Ímar and a member of the Uí Ímair.

== Biography ==
Sitriuc succeeded his brother Sichfrith as King of Dublin in 888. For most of Sitriuc's reign, and for the decade preceding it, Dublin was weakened by internal strife and dynastic feuds. Sichfrith had been a victim of these; he was killed by an unnamed kinsman of the Uí Ímair. However, despite these problems the Dubliners fought successful wars against the forces of Leinster and the Southern Uí Néill. In 893 Sitriuc was challenged for the control of Dublin by one Jarl Sichfrith (Note: This is a separate individual to Sitriuc's brother Sichfrith.), with both claiming the title of king. Sitriuc and Sichfrith left Dublin separately that year for military campaigns in Britain, and although Sitriuc returned a year later it is unknown which of the two, if either, retained the title of king.

Sitriuc was killed by a number of other unnamed Vikings in 896. His death coincided with the death of two other prominent Vikings, Glúntradna son of Glúniarann and Amlaíb, grandson of Ímar, marking a serious drop in the political stability of the kingdom. It has been speculated the aforementioned Glúniarann succeeded Sitriuc as king.

== Family ==
Sitriuc was a son of Ímar and had at least two brothers, Bárid and Sichfrith, both of whom were Kings of Dublin before him. Ímar is considered by some authorities to be identical to Ivar the Boneless, a Viking leader and a commander of the Great Heathen Army which invaded the Anglo-Saxon kingdoms of England in 865. According to the Norse sagas Ímar was one of the sons of Ragnar Lodbrok, and his brothers included Björn Ironside, Halfdan Ragnarsson, Sigurd Snake-in-the-Eye and Ubba. Ímar had at least five grandsons, Ragnall, Ímar, Sitric Cáech, Amlaíb, and Gofraid, but their parents are unidentified, so it is not possible to say which, if any, were the children of Sitriuc.
