= Máel Muire ingen Amlaíb =

Máel Muire (died 1021) was Queen of Ireland, being actually styled so in the Annals of Clonmacnoise. The wife of Máel Sechnaill mac Domnaill, High King of Ireland, she was a daughter of Amlaíb Cuarán, King of Dublin until 980/1 and formerly King of York. Thus she was a member of the Norse-Irish Uí Ímair dynasty and the first Queen of Ireland of ultimately foreign or non-Gaelic lineage known to be historical. One of her brothers was the celebrated King of Dublin Sitric Silkbeard, while a sister Gytha was wife to Olaf Tryggvason, King of Norway.

Máel Sechnaill's earlier wife, and quite possibly Máel Muire's own mother, being first married to Amlaíb Cuarán, was the thrice married Gormflaith ingen Murchada, who became married to Brian Bóruma c. 999, but it is unknown when Máel Muire replaced her. Since Brian was not recognized High King until 1002, it is then possible Máel Muire was already queen when he deposed Máel Sechnaill, becoming queen again when Brian died in the Battle of Clontarf in 1014, succeeding her possible mother Gormflaith twice. In the interval she would have been styled both Queen of Mide and Queen of Tara.
