= Bárid mac Ímair =

King of Dublin

Bárid mac Ímar

King of Dublin
- Reign: 873–881
- Predecessor: Ímar
- Successor: Sichfrith mac Ímair
- Died: 881; Dublin
- Issue: Eloir; Uathmarán
- Dynasty: Uí Ímair
- Father: Ímar

Bárid mac Ímar (also referred to as Baraid or Bardur Ivarsson); Old Norse: Bárðr [ˈbɑːrðz̠] or Bárǫðr [ˈbɑːrˌɔðz̠]; d. 881) was a ninth-century King of Dublin. He was a son of Ivar (Ímar) Ragnarsson and a member of the Uí Ímair.

== Biography ==
The earliest mention of Bárid in the Irish Annals is in part of a saga embedded within the Fragmentary Annals of Ireland. (Note: The Fragmentary Annals were written several hundred years after the events they describe, and are considered less reliable than earlier annals such as the Annals of Ulster which may have served, along with historically dubious sagas, as partial sources for the Fragmentary Annals.) In this entry, dated 867, Bárid is named as a Jarl of Lochlann (Note: "Lochlann" is believed to refer to Viking-controlled Scotland and Man, though in later times it came to mean Norway.) who, along with a Jarl Háimar was ambushed by men of Connacht. Bárid is mentioned again by a saga element within the Fragmentary Annals in 872, when he is said to have raided Moylurg and the islands of Lough Ree. This saga element also says that Bárid fostered a son of Áed Findliath, overking of the Northern Uí Néill. The sagas are usually considered of dubious historical value, but this particular element draws upon earlier written accounts, and there is much evidence for later links between the descendants of Áed Findliath and the Uí Ímair. Fosterage was used in Ireland as a means of strengthening ties between different ruling families, and it is possible Bárid may have tried to integrate himself with the Irish political elite.

Bárid is mentioned by the Annals of Inisfallen in 873 which say:

Bárid with a great fleet from Áth Cliath [went] by sea westwards, and he plundered Ciarraige Luachra under ground, i.e., the raiding of the caves.

Downham suggests this raid was undertaken as a show of strength; it occurred shortly after the death of Ímar, with Bárid probably succeeding him as King of Dublin. Cogad Gáedel re Gallaib names a son of Amlaíb, most likely Oistin, as raiding with him. (Note: For a discussion of the historical value of Cogad Gáedel re Gallaib see Ní Mhaonaigh.) It has been suggested that Bárid and his cousin Oistin ruled together as co-kings following the death of Ímar.

According to the Annals of Ulster, in 875 Oistin was "deceitfully" killed by "Albann", a figure generally agreed to be Halfdan Ragnarsson, supposed son of the legendary Viking Ragnar Lodbrok. (Note: The historicity of Ragnar is uncertain and the identification of Ragnar as the father of Halfdan is not to be relied upon.) Halfdan is sometimes considered a brother of Ímar, and this conflict may have been an attempt by Halfdan to claim Dublin for his own. It seems he was not successful in pressing his claim, but he tried to take Dublin again in 877, and he fell in battle against an army of "fair foreigners" at the Battle of Strangford Lough. Cogad Gáedel re Gallaib identifies Bárid as the leader of the "fair foreigners", and as being wounded "so that he was lame ever after".

The next mention of Bárid in the annals comes in 881, when the Annals of Ulster, the Annals of the Four Masters, and the Chronicon Scotorum describe his death; he was killed and burnt in Dublin shortly after raiding Duleek. The annals attribute his death to a miracle of Saint Cianán.

== Family ==
Bárid's father is identified by the Chronicon Scotorum as Ímar, King of Dublin until his death in 873. Ímar is sometimes identified with Ivar the Boneless, son of the legendary Viking Ragnar Lodbrok. The same entry identifies him as "the head of the Northmen". The known brothers of Bárid were Sichfrith (died 888) and Sitriuc (died 896).

Bárid is identified as the father of Uathmarán, who bore an Irish name derived from the Irish word "uathmar", meaning ‘awesome’, perhaps in an attempt to associate with the Irish political elite. Bárid may also be identified as the father of Eloir mac Báirid (died 891), and the grandfather of the unnamed son of Uathmarán mac Bárid (fl. 921). This unnamed man may be identical to Sichfrith mac Uathmaráin (fl. 932), who was identified as the nephew of Fergal mac Domnall, king of Ailech, presumably via marriage with Fergal's daughter. It is uncertain whether Bárid was the father of the unnamed son of Bárid (mac Bárid in the original Old Irish) who plundered Cill Clethi in 937. This unnamed man may be identical to Aric mac Báirith (died 937). Likewise, it is uncertain if Bárid was the father of Colla mac Báirid (fl. 924). However, Downham believes it is more likely that Bárid mac Oitir (died 914) was the father of Colla, based on chronology and the pattern of political alliances. It is also possible that Aric and the unnamed son of Bárid could have been sons of Bárid mac Oitir rather than Bárid mac Ímair.
