= Ímar =

9th-century Viking king of Dublin

King of the Norsemen of all Ireland and Britannia
- Reign: 873

King of Dublin
- Reign: c. 857–873
- Died: c. 873
- Issue: Bárid; Sitriuc; Sichfrith
- Dynasty: Uí Ímair (founder)
- Father: Gofraid

Ímar (Old Norse: Ívarr [ˈĩːˌwɑrː]; died c. 873) was a powerful Viking (Note: The definition as given by Downham is used here - Vikings were "people of Scandinavian culture who were active outside of Scandinavia".) leader in Ireland and Scotland in the mid-late ninth century. He was the progenitor of the Uí Ímair dynasty, who would go on to dominate the Irish Sea region for several centuries. He was the son of the king of Lochlann, identified in the non-contemporary Fragmentary Annals of Ireland as Gofraid. The Fragmentary Annals name Auisle and Amlaíb Conung as his brothers. Another Viking leader, Halfdan Ragnarsson, is considered by some scholars to be another brother. The Irish Annals title Amlaíb, Ímar and Auisle "kings of the foreigners". Modern scholars use the title "Kings of Dublin" after the Viking settlement which formed the base of their power. Some scholars consider Ímar to be identical to Ivar the Boneless, a Viking commander of the Great Heathen Army named in contemporary English sources who also appears in the Icelandic sagas as the eldest son of the legendary Viking Ragnar Lodbrok by third wife Aslaug.

During the late 850s and early 860s, Ímar was involved in a protracted conflict with Máel Sechnaill, overking of the Southern Uí Néill and the most powerful ruler in Ireland. The cause of the conflict is uncertain, but it may have been sparked by competition for control of Munster and its resources. Ímar allied successively with Cerball, King of Osraige and Áed Findliath, overking of the Northern Uí Néill against Máel Sechnaill. Máel Sechnaill died in 862 and his lands were split, effectively ending the conflict. Following this Ímar and his kin warred with several Irish leaders in an attempt to expand their kingdom's influence. Ímar disappears from the historical record in Ireland between the years 864 and 870; this is consistent with Ímar being identical to Ivar the Boneless - Ivar was active in England between these two dates and he is not mentioned by English sources after 870. In 870 the annals record that Dumbarton Rock, the chief fortress of the kingdom of Strathclyde, was successfully captured by Ímar and Amlaíb following a four-month-long siege.

Ímar died in 873 and is given the title "King of the Norsemen of all Ireland and Britain" in contemporary annals. The Fragmentary Annals record that Ímar's father also died that year, and it is believed that at that time their combined territory encompassed Dublin, the Isle of Man, the Western Isles, Orkney, and large parts of the northern and western Scottish coast including Argyll, Caithness and Sutherland.

== Background ==
Norse contact with Scotland predates the first written records in the 8th century, although the nature and frequency of these contacts is unknown. Excavations on the island of Unst in Shetland indicate that Scandinavian settlers had reached there perhaps as early as the mid-7th century, and from 793 onwards repeated raids by Vikings on the British Isles are recorded. "All the islands of Britain" were devastated in 794 with Iona being sacked in 802 and 806. The Frankish Annales Bertiniani may record the conquest of the Inner Hebrides by Vikings in 847. Scholarly interpretations of the period "have led to widely divergent reconstructions of Viking Age Scotland", especially in the early period, and Barrett has identified several competing theories, none of which he regards as proven. Donnchadh Ó Corráin notes: "when and how the Vikings conquered and occupied the Isles is unknown, perhaps unknowable".

The earliest recorded Viking raids in Ireland occurred in 795. Over time, these raids increased in intensity, and they overwintered in Ireland for the first time in 840–841. In 841 a longphort was constructed at Áth Cliath (Irish for hurdled ford), a site which would later develop into the city of Dublin. Longphorts were also established at other sites around Ireland, some of which developed into larger Viking settlements over time. The Viking population in Ireland was boosted in 851 with the arrival of a large group known as "dark foreigners" – a contentious term used to refer to the newly arrived Vikings, as opposed to the "fair foreigners", i.e., the Viking population which was resident prior to this influx. (Note: Dubgaill and Finngaill respectively in Old Irish. Ímar and his kin are counted among the Dubgaill. Historically, it was believed Dubgaill referred to "dark" Danish Vikings and Finngaill referred to "fair" Norwegian Vikings, though that interpretation has been challenged in recent years.) A kingdom in Viking Scotland was established by the mid ninth-century, and it exerted control over some of the Vikings in Ireland. By 853 a separate kingdom of Dublin had been set up which claimed control over all the Vikings in Ireland.

The main historical sources for this period are the Norse sagas and the Irish annals. Some of the annals, such as the Annals of Ulster, are believed to be contemporary accounts, whereas the sagas were written down at dates much later than the events they describe and are considered far less reliable. A few of the annals, such as the Fragmentary Annals of Ireland and the Annals of the Four Masters, were also compiled at later dates, in part from more contemporary material and in part from fragments of sagas. According to Downham, "apart from these additions [of saga fragments], Irish chronicles are considered by scholars to be largely accurate records, albeit partisan in their presentation of events".

== Biography ==
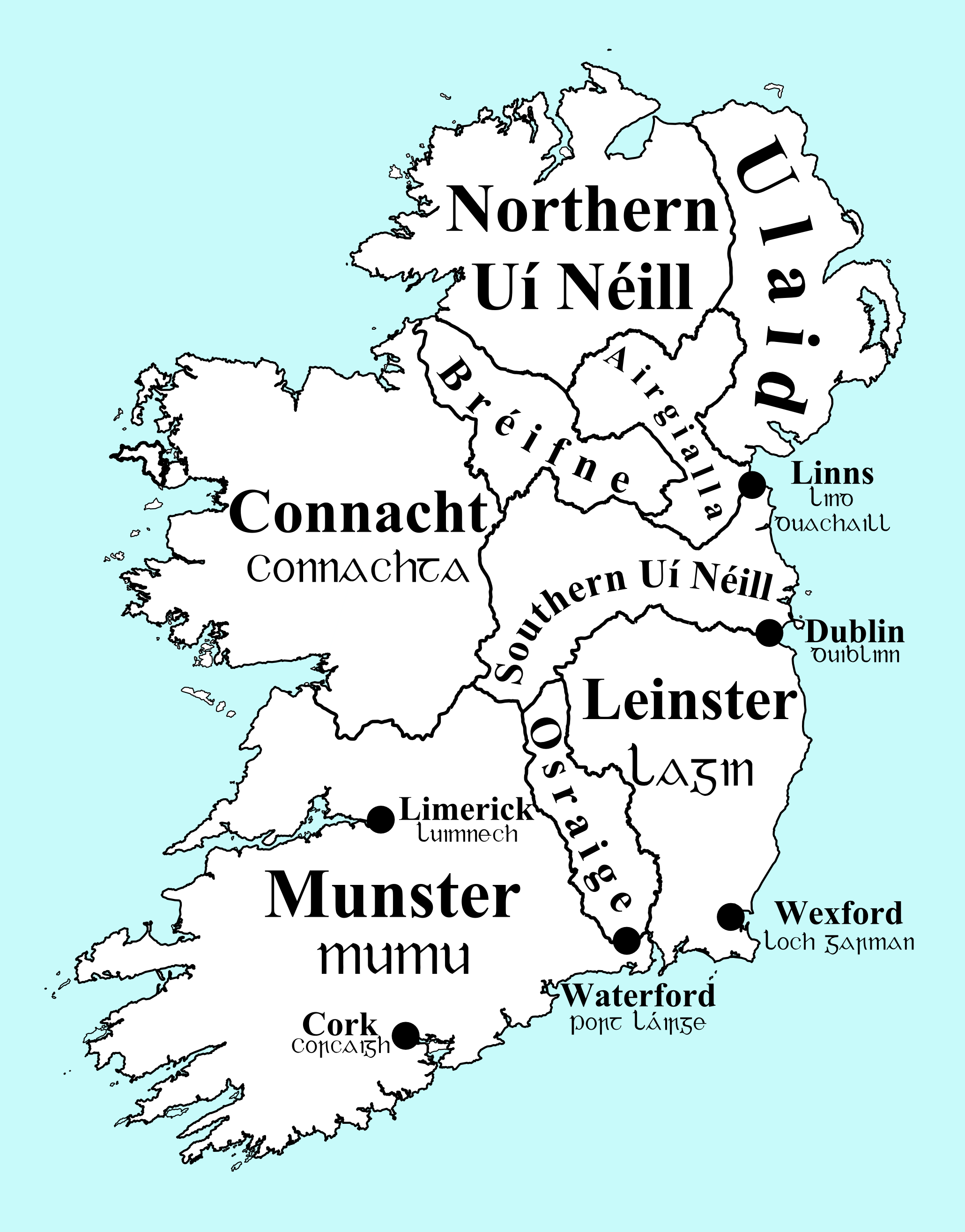
Ireland circa 900; the Viking settlements of Linns, Dublin, Wexford, Waterford, Cork and Limerick are marked

=== Arrival in Ireland ===
Ímar is first mentioned in contemporary Irish annals in 857, four years after his brother Amlaíb Conung is recorded as arriving in Ireland. The later Fragmentary Annals of Ireland suggest Ímar may have come to Ireland shortly after his brother:

Also in this year, i.e., the sixth year of the reign of Máel Sechlainn, Amlaíb Conung, son of the king of Lochlann, came to Ireland, and he brought with him a proclamation of many tributes and taxes from his father, and he departed suddenly. Then his younger brother Ímar came after him to levy the same tribute. (Note: Ó Corrain dates this to 852–853.)

Ímar and Amlaíb were joined in Ireland by another brother, Auisle, sometime before 863. From this date onwards the three brothers are described as "kings of the foreigners" by the annals, but in modern texts they are usually labelled as kings of Dublin, after the Viking settlement which was the base of their power. Lochlann, originally Laithlinn or Lothlend, the land where Ímar's father was king, is often identified with Norway, but it is not universally accepted that it had such a meaning in early times. Several historians have proposed instead that in early times, and certainly as late as the Battle of Clontarf in 1014, Lochlann refers to the Norse and Norse-Gael lands in the Hebrides, the Isle of Man, the Northern Isles and parts of mainland Scotland. Whatever the original sense, by the twelfth century, when Magnus Barefoot undertook his expedition to the West, it had come to mean Norway.

=== War with Máel Sechnaill ===
The first mention of Ímar in Irish annals in 857 concerns a war fought between Ímar and Amlaíb Conung against Máel Sechnaill, (Note: Some sources use the name "Máel Sechnaill" and some use "Máel Sechlainn" to refer to this person.) overking of the Southern Uí Néill, and a group of Vikings sometimes known as the Norse-Irish. (Note: "Norse-Irish" is a translation of the Old Irish term Gallgoídil (literally Foreigner-Gaels). The origins of this group are debated, but they are usually considered Vikings of mixed Gaelic and Scandinavian culture. They do not appear in the Irish Annals after 858, possibly because in later years mixed-ethnicity was the norm, rather than the exception.) Máel Sechnaill was the most powerful king in Ireland at the time and his lands lay close to the Viking settlement of Dublin. The fighting began in the previous year: "Great warfare between the heathens and Mael Sechnaill, supported by Norse-Irish" is reported by the Annals of Ulster.

The fighting was focused on Munster; Máel Sechnaill sought to increase his influence over the kings there. He took hostages from the province in 854, 856 and 858, and the power of the over-kings had been weakened in 856 by a Viking raid on the royal centre at Lough Cend, when Gormán son of Lonán, a relative of Munster's over-king, was killed alongside a great many others. This weakness likely drew the gaze of both Máel Sechnaill and the Vikings, and their competition for Munster's resources may have been the cause of the war. Early battles seem to have gone the way of the Vikings: Ímar and Amlaíb "inflicted a rout on Caitill the Fair and his Norse-Irish in the lands of Munster". Although there is no certain evidence to suggest that this Caitill is the same person as the Ketill Flatnose of later sagas, Anderson and Crawford have suggested that they are the same person.

In 858 Ímar, allied with Cerball, King of Ossory, routed a force of Norse-Irish at Araid Tíre (east of Lough Derg and the Shannon in modern-day County Tipperary). Ossory was a small kingdom wedged between the larger realms of Munster and Leinster. At the beginning of his reign in the 840s, Cerball's allegiance was pledged to the over-king of Munster, but as that kingdom grew weaker Ossory's strategic location allowed opportunities for his advancement. Cerball had previously fought against the Vikings, but he allied with them to challenge the supremacy of Máel Sechnaill and his Norse-Irish allies. The following year Amlaíb, Ímar and Cerball conducted a raid on Máel Sechnaill's heartlands in Meath, (Note: "Meath" refers to a territory corresponding to modern Counties Meath and Westmeath, plus neighbouring areas, not modern County Meath alone. This territory was controlled by the Southern Uí Néill.) and in consequence a royal conference was held at Rathugh (modern-day County Westmeath). Following this meeting Cerball shed his allegiance to the Vikings and formally submitted to Máel Sechnaill in order to "make peace and amity between the men of Ireland".

With their ally turned against them, Ímar and Amlaíb sought a new alliance with Áed Findliath, overking of the Northern Uí Néill, and rival of Máel Sechnaill. In 860 Máel Sechnaill and Cerball led a large army of men from Munster, Leinster, Connacht and the Southern Uí Néill into the lands of Áed Findliath near Armagh. While the southern forces were encamped there, Áed launched a night attack, killing some of the southern men, but his forces took many casualties and were forced to retreat. (Note: Here, "southern" is used to refer to Máel Sechnaill and his allies.) In retaliation for this invasion Amlaíb and Áed led raids into Meath in 861 and 862, but they were driven off both times. According to the Fragmentary Annals this alliance had been cemented by a political marriage:

Áed son of Niall and his son-in-law Amlaíb (Áed's daughter was Amlaíb's wife) went with great armies of Irish and Norwegians to the plain of Mide, and they plundered it and killed many freemen. (Note: "Mide" is the Old Irish term for Meath.)

In later years, alliance between the Northern Uí Néill and the Vikings of Dublin became a regular occurrence: the Northern and Southern Uí Néill were frequent competitors for supremacy in Ireland, and the uneasy neighbourhood between Dublin and the Southern Uí Néill made the Vikings natural allies for the Northerners.

=== Later life ===
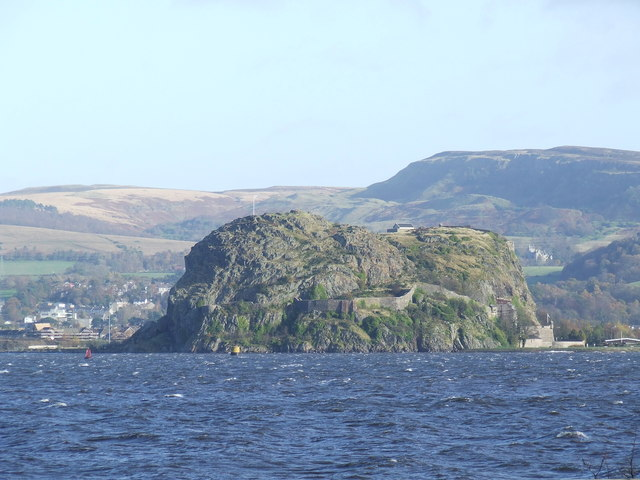
Dumbarton Rock (Alt Clut), captured by Ímar and Amlaíb after a four-month siege in 870

Máel Sechnaill died in 862, and his territory in Meath was split between two rulers, Lorcán mac Cathail and Conchobar mac Donnchada. Ímar and Amlaíb, now joined in Ireland by their younger brother Auisle, sought to make use of this change to extend their influence in the lands of the Southern Uí Néill. In 863 the three brothers raided Brega in alliance with Lorcán, and the following year Amlaíb drowned Conchobar at Clonard Abbey. Muirecán mac Diarmata, overking of the Uí Dúnchada, was killed by Vikings in 863, probably by Ímar and his kin trying to expand into Leinster. (Note: Thirty years previously Muirecán and his kin had claimed to be overkings of Leinster, but by the time of his death the success of Máel Sechnaill in imposing his authority in Leinster, combined with debilitating Viking raids had reduced the territory ruled by Muirecán's dynasty to "Naas and the eastern plain of the River Liffey".)

Beginning around 864 the three brothers halted their campaigns of conquest in Ireland, and instead campaigned in Britain. Ímar disappears from the Irish Annals in 864, and does not reappear until 870. Downham concludes he is identical to Ivar the Boneless, a Viking leader who was active in England during this period as a commander of the Great Heathen Army. According to O Croinin "Ímar has been identified with Ívarr Beinlausi (the boneless), son of Ragnar Lodbrok, but the matter is controversial".

The reappearance of Ímar in Irish annals in 870 is marked by a raid undertaken by him and Amlaíb. They laid siege to Dumbarton Rock, the chief fortress of the Kingdom of Strathclyde, and captured it following a four-month siege. The pair returned to Dublin in 871 with 200 ships and they "brought with them in captivity a great prey of Angles, Britons and Picts". According to the Fragmentary Annals Amlaíb returned to Lochlann that year to aid their father in a war, leaving Ímar to rule alone (Auisle had died in 867). The Pictish Chronicle claims Amlaíb died around 874 during a protracted campaign against Constantine I in Scotland. (Note: An alternative date of 872 for Amlaíb's death has been proposed, perhaps explaining why Ímar is named as "king of the Norsemen of all Ireland and Britain" upon his death in 873.) The Fragmentary Annals record the death of Ímar's father, Gofraid, in 873. The final mention of Ímar in contemporary annals is also in 873 when his death is reported. In these reports he is titled "king of the Norsemen of all Ireland and Britain". According to Ó Corrain the evidence suggests that by his death Ímar's kingdom (including the territory formerly ruled by his father) included Man, the Western Isles, Argyll, Caithness, Sutherland, Orkney, and parts of the coastline of Ross and Cromarty and Inverness.

== Origins ==
=== Ivar the Boneless ===
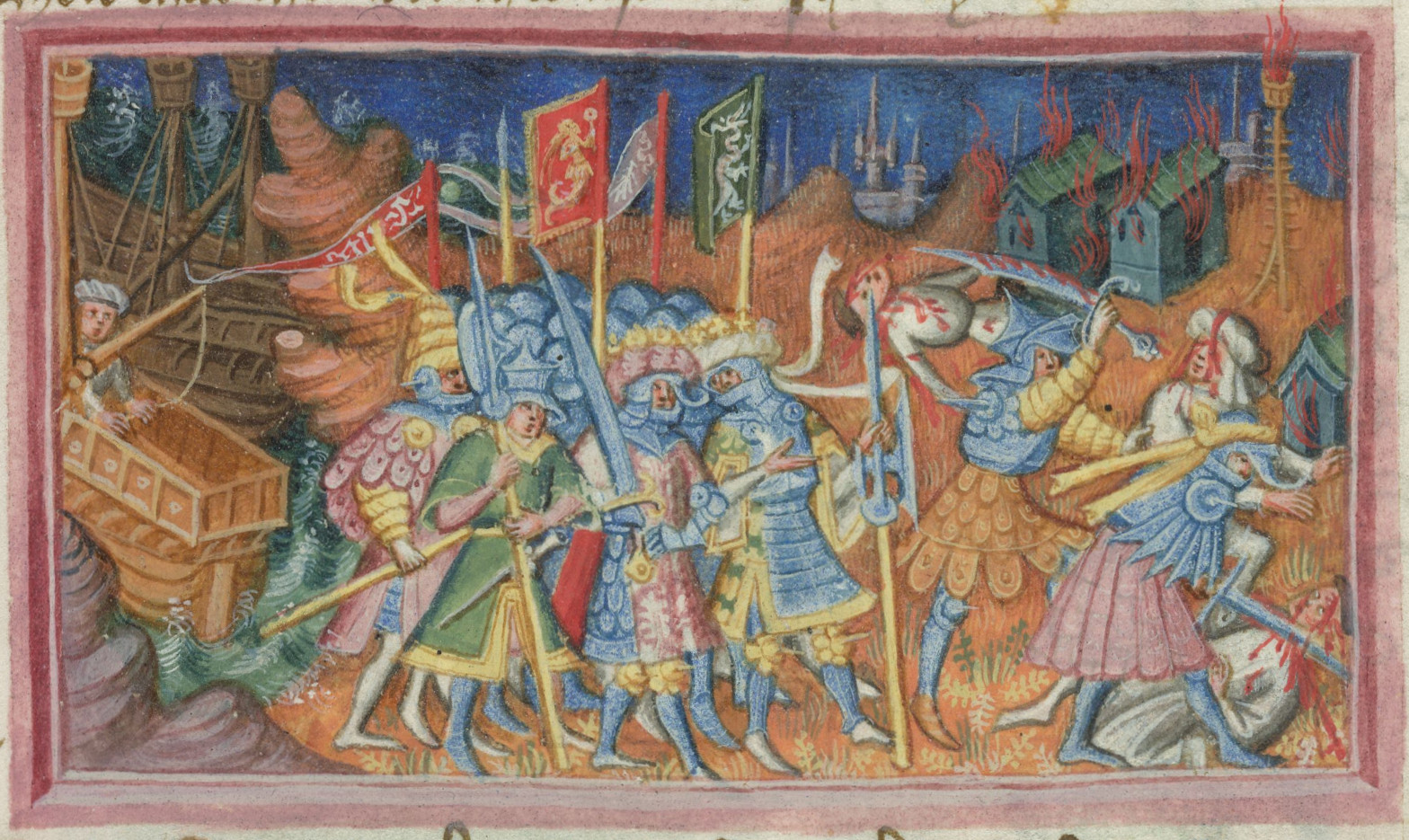
Excerpt from Harley MS 2278 depicting Ivar the Boneless and Ubba ravaging the countryside. Lydgate's imaginative hagiography presents supposed ninth-century events in a chivalric context

In 865 the Great Heathen Army landed in England and one of its leaders is identified by the Anglo-Saxon Chronicle as "Ingvar". (Note: Other spellings of this name include Ingware, Hingwar, Iuuar, Ingwar and Inguar.) Later Norse tradition records Ingvar under the name of Ivar the Boneless, and calls him a son of the legendary Ragnar Lodbrok. It is generally accepted that Ivar the Boneless and Ingvar are one and the same, though the epithet "the Boneless" is not recorded until the twelfth century and its origins are obscure. Moreover, some suppose Ivar the Boneless to be identical to Ímar, though there is no scholarly consensus one way or another. Woolf supports the connection between these two "Ivars" and writes of the Great Heathen Army that invaded East Anglia in 865 that "it is now generally agreed that they arrived in Britain directly from Ireland where Ívarr, the senior partner by 865, had been active for at least a decade". Ó Corrain argues that the "evidence in favour of the identification of Ímar and Inguar consists of three points: the identity of the names, the absence of any mention of Ímar in the Irish annals between 864 and the Irish account of the siege of Dumbarton in 870, and the subsequent close connections between the dynasties of Dublin and York". Forte, Oram, and Pedersen note that Ivar is not mentioned in any English source after 870, when Ímar reappears in the Irish annals.

=== Dark and fair foreigners ===
In the Irish annals the terms Dubgaill (dark foreigners), and Finngaill (fair foreigners), are used to refer to rival groups of Vikings. The exact meaning of these terms is subject to debate, but historically the most popular interpretation has been that Dubgaill refers to Danes and Finngaill refers to Norwegians. From 917 onwards the descendants of Ímar are described as leaders of the Dubgaill. Ímar himself is not identified explicitly by the annals with the Dubgaill, but Albann, a figure considered by some to be Ímar's brother, is called "lord of the 'Dark Foreigners'". (Note: Ivar the Boneless and the Great Heathen Army are described as "Black Gentiles" by the Annales Cambriae.). In a recent public lecture (Dublinia, 27 March 2026) Clare Downham noted that the term 'gall' is used to denote people of other cultures who are settled in the Gaelic world, not foreigners active outside it, so it is unlikely to refer to Danes and Norwegians. The term 'gall' might better be translated as 'settler'.

However, the interpretation of "dark" Danes and "fair" Norwegians has recently been challenged. Dumville has suggested that Dubgaill and Finngaill do not refer to any cultural difference but instead distinguish between "old" and "new" Vikings, with the group arriving with Ímar being the "new" or "dark" Vikings, and the preexisting group being the "old" or "fair" Vikings. Downham agrees and goes a step further, suggesting that Dubgaill was applied "to followers the king of Laithlind (who had become a recurrent phenomenon for the chroniclers) as a convenient way of distinguishing them from the vikings who were already in Ireland".

=== Ynglings ===
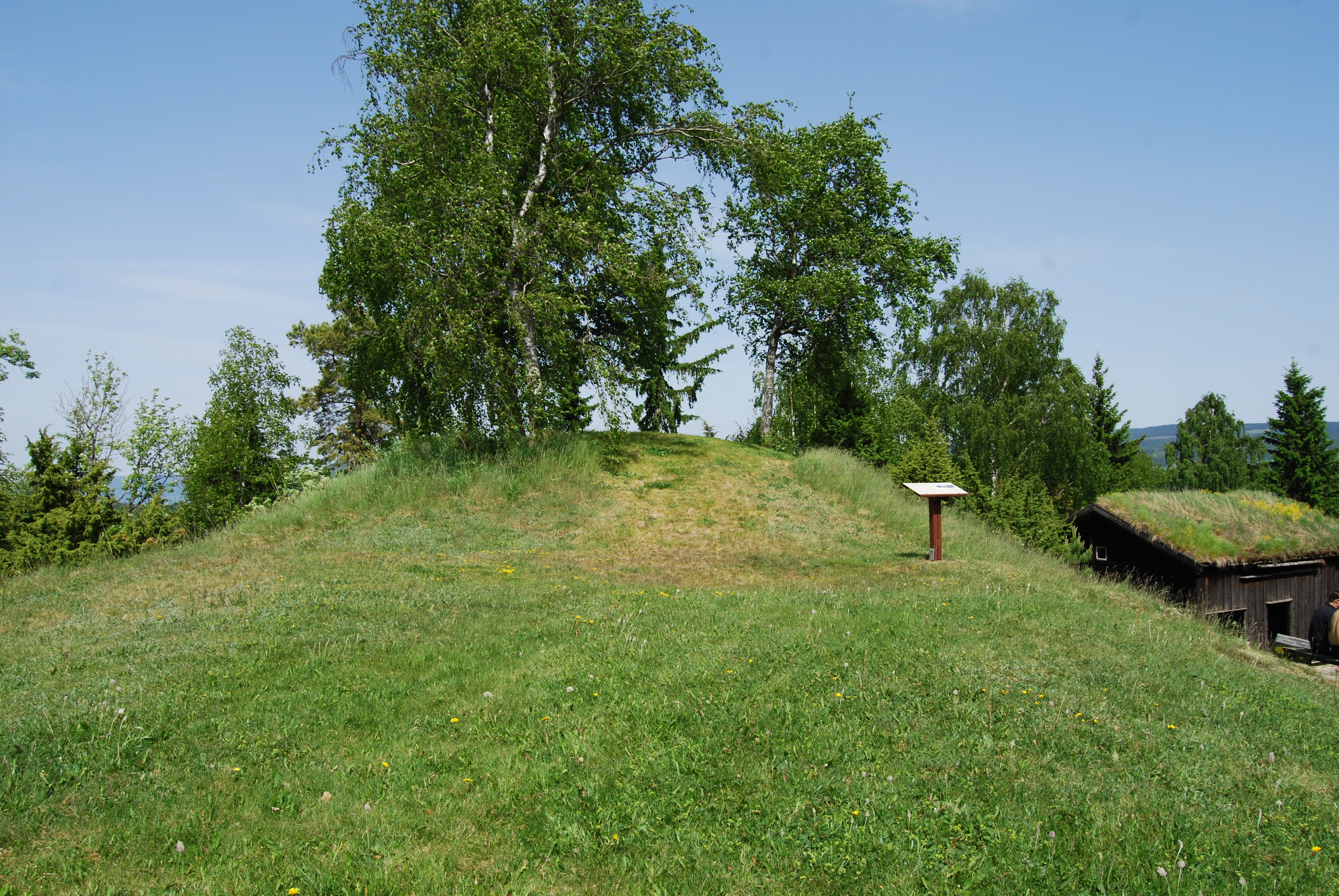
Halvdanshaugen at Hadeland Folkemuseum, one of the several supposed burial sites of Halfdan the Black, legendary ninth-century Yngling king of Vestfold

Smyth has suggested that Amlaíb can be identified with Olaf Geirstad-Alf, King of Vestfold, who was the son of Gudrød the Hunter and half-brother of Halfdan the Black, though speculation of this nature has not received much support. Ó Corrain states that there is "no good historical or linguistic evidence to link Lothlend/Laithlind with Norway, and none to link the dynasty of Dublin to the shadowy history of the Ynglings of Vestfold".

== Family ==
Ímar’s parentage is uncertain. The Fragmentary Annals of Ireland identify his father as Gofraid, presenting a genealogy that traces Ímar as “Ímar son of Gofraid son of Ragnall son of Gofraid Conung son of Gofraid”. Modern scholarship treats this genealogy with caution. Ó Corráin describes it as a political construct of limited historical value, likely intended to legitimize later dynastic claims rather than preserve genuine lineage. Nonetheless, it remains possible that Ímar’s father was a historical figure named Gofraid (Old Norse Guðrøðr), a dynastic ancestor remembered imperfectly in later sources.

Ímar is recorded alongside Amlaíb Conung and Auisle (Óisle). Amlaíb arrived in Ireland in 853, with Ímar following by 857 and Auisle by 863. In 863, the Annals of Ulster describe them as “kings of the foreigners”, while the Fragmentary Annals identify them as brothers. Auisle was killed in 867 by kinsmen, described by the annals as parricide. The Fragmentary Annals attribute the killing to Amlaíb and Ímar, though no motive is provided. Despite the lack of explicit fraternal identification in contemporary annals, recurrence of their names among later rulers strongly suggests a familial connection.

Some scholars identify Halfdan Ragnarsson as another brother, contingent on identifying Ímar with Ivar the Boneless from the Anglo-Saxon Chronicle, which names Ivar and Halfdan as brothers. Later sources identify an additional brother slain in Devon with Hubba (Ubba). This identification remains debated, particularly due to conflicting traditions concerning Ragnar Loðbrók, whose historicity is uncertain.

Three sons of Ímar—Bárid (d. 881), Sichfrith (d. 888), and Sitriuc mac Ímair (d. 896)—ruled as kings of Dublin. In addition, several rulers styled ua Ímair (“grandson of Ímar”) appear in the annals, including Sitric Cáech, Ímar ua Ímair, Ragnall ua Ímair, Amlaíb, and Gofraid ua Ímair. These figures are never given patronymics, prompting debate over the precise lineage. One possibility is descent through a non-ruling son of Ímar; another, increasingly noted in modern scholarship, is descent through a daughter.

Ímar’s descendants are collectively known as the Uí Ímair (“descendants of Ímar”). Members of this dynasty dominated major seaports of Ireland and exerted significant influence in Dublin, Northumbria, and the Isles throughout the late ninth and tenth centuries.

Their power declined following the Battle of Clontarf in 1014, though collateral lines continued to hold sway in the Irish Sea region. The Crovan dynasty of Mann and the Isles is generally accepted as descending from Ímar through Amlaíb Cuarán

== Notes ==
=== Primary sources ===
- Thorpe, B, ed. (1861). The Anglo-Saxon Chronicle. Rerum Britannicarum Medii Ævi Scriptores. Vol. 1. London: Longman, Green, Longman, and Roberts. Accessed via Internet Archive.
- "Annals of the Four Masters". Corpus of Electronic Texts (16 December 2013 ed.). University College Cork. 2013.
- "The Annals of Ulster". Corpus of Electronic Texts (15 August 2012 ed.). University College Cork. 2012.
- "Chronicon Scotorum". Corpus of Electronic Texts (24 March 2010 ed.). University College Cork. 2010.
- "Fragmentary Annals of Ireland". Corpus of Electronic Texts (5 September 2008 ed.). University College Cork. 2008.
- "Harley MS 2278". British Library.
- Murphy, D, ed. (1896). The Annals of Clonmacnoise. Dublin: Royal Society of Antiquaries of Ireland. Accessed via Internet Archive.

=== Secondary sources ===
- Anderson, Alan Orr (1922). Early Sources of Scottish History: A.D 500–1286. Vol. 2. Edinburgh: Oliver and Boyd.
- Ballin Smith, Beverley; Taylor, Simon; Williams, Gareth, eds. (2007). West Over Sea: Studies in Scandinavian Sea-borne Expansion and Settlement Before 1300. Brill. ISBN 978-9-0041-5893-1.
- Barrett, James H. (2008). "The Norse in Scotland". In Brink, Stefan (ed.). The Viking World. Abingdon: Routledge. ISBN 978-0-415-33315-3.
- Clarke, Howard B.; Ní Mhaonaigh, Máire; Ó Floinn, Raghnall (1998). Ireland and Scandinavia in the Early Viking Age. Four Courts Press. ISBN 978-1-85182-235-5.
- Costambeys, Marios (2004). "Hálfdan (d. 877)". Oxford Dictionary of National Biography. Oxford University Press. doi:10.1093/ref:odnb/49260. Subscription or UK public library membership required.
- Crawford, Barbara (1987). Scandinavian Scotland. Leicester: Leicester University Press. ISBN 0-7185-1282-0.
- Downham, Clare (2007). Viking Kings of Britain and Ireland: The Dynasty of Ívarr to A.D. 1014. Edinburgh: Dunedin Academic Press. ISBN 978-1-903765-89-0.
- Dumville, David N. (2004). "Old Dubliners and New Dubliners in Ireland and Britain: A Viking Age Story". Medieval Dublin. 6: 78–93.
- Duffy, Seán (15 January 2005). Medieval Ireland: An Encyclopedia. Routledge. ISBN 978-1-135-94824-5.
- Forte, A; Oram, RD; Pedersen, F (2005). Viking Empires. Cambridge: Cambridge University Press. ISBN 978-0-521-82992-2.
- Frantzen, AJ (2004). Bloody Good: Chivalry, Sacrifice, and the Great War. Chicago: University of Chicago Press. ISBN 0-226-26085-2.
- Graham-Campbell, James; Batey, Colleen E. (1998). Vikings in Scotland: An Archaeological Survey. Edinburgh University Press. ISBN 978-0-748-60641-2.
- Helle, Knut, ed. (2003). The Cambridge History of Scandinavia. Volume 1: Prehistory to 1520. Cambridge: Cambridge University Press. ISBN 0-521-47299-7.
- Holman, Katherine (2003). Historical dictionary of the Vikings. Lanham, Maryland: Scarecrow Press. ISBN 978-0-8108-4859-7.
- Hudson, Benjamin T. (2005). Viking Pirates and Christian Princes: Dynasty, Religion, and Empire in the North Atlantic. Oxford University Press. ISBN 978-0-19-516237-0.
- Miller, Molly. "Amlaíb trahens centum". Scottish Gaelic Studies. 19: 241–245.
- Ó Corrain, Donnchadh (1979). "High-Kings, Vikings and Other Kings". Irish Historical Studies. 22: 283–323.
- Ó Corrain, Donnchadh (1998). "The Vikings in Scotland and Ireland in the Ninth Century" (PDF). Peritia. 12: 296–339.
- O Croinin, Daibhi (16 December 2013). Early Medieval Ireland, 400-1200. Routledge. ISBN 978-1-317-90176-1.
- Oram, Richard D. (2011). Domination and Lordship: Scotland 1070–1230. The New Edinburgh History of Scotland (series vol. 3). Edinburgh: Edinburgh University Press. ISBN 978-0-7486-1496- 7.
- Radner, Joan. "Writing history: Early Irish historiography and the significance of form" (PDF). Celtica. 23: 312–325. Archived from the original (PDF) on 23 September 2015.
- Smyth, Alfred P. (1977). Scandinavian kings in the British Isles, 850-880. Oxford University Press.
- South, Ted Johnson (2002). Historia de Sancto Cuthberto. Boydell & Brewer. ISBN 978-0-85991-627-1.
- Thomson, William P. L. (2008). The New History of Orkney. Edinburgh: Birlinn. ISBN 978-1-84158-696-0.
- Woolf, Alex (2005). "The Vikings in Scotland and Ireland in the Ninth Century" (PDF). Medieval Scandinavia. 15: 296–339.
- Woolf, Alex (2007). From Pictland to Alba: 789 - 1070. Edinburgh University Press. ISBN 978-0-7486-1234-5.
