= Ressad =

Ressad or Ress refers to a now lost city and possibly also to a territory that is still unidentified but believed by scholars to have been somewhere within the borders of modern County Limerick in western Ireland, in what was once the territory of the kingdom of the Uí Fidgenti.

The name occurs in only a small number of surviving sources, which for this region of Ireland, of once respectable wealth, are generally quite poor.

== Battle of Ressad ==
- Túathal Techtmar

== Colmán of Cloyne ==
According to the early tale known as Conall Corc and the Corcu Luigde, Saint Colmán of Cloyne cursed the city of Ressad, which brought down its walls.

Maleditione Colman maic Leneni muri ciuitatis Ressad ceciderunt.

== Kings of Ressad ==
Only two Kings of Ressad are known from the surviving sources, both probably belonging to the second half of the 10th century.

The Annals of Inisfallen style Donnubán mac Cathail, until this time styled King of Uí Fidgenti, instead King of Ressad at his death in 980. He is the only king ever so styled in all the (surviving and intact) Irish annals.

AI980.2: Death of Donnubán, king of Ress. / Bás Dondubain, ríg Ressad.{folio 18d}

The early 12th century saga and political tract Cogad Gáedel re Gallaib names the only other known King of Ressad as the otherwise unknown Flaithrí mac Allamarain, but who is said to belong to the 10th century like Donnubán and may have preceded him. The author of CGG states he was one of the Munster kings slain by Ivar of Limerick circa 967 before the Battle of Sulcoit. Notably Donnubán was Ivar's ally, and is said to have been his son-in-law, but none of this is specifically associated with Ressad in the passage.

Faelan, son of Cormac, king of the Desi, and Flathri, son of Allamaran, king of Ressad, and Sidechad, son of Segni, king of Titill... were killed by Ivar of Luimnech and the foreigners who were with him, because they were endeavouring to hinder the expedition.

Finally, whether related to Ress/Ressad or not, there is also a Flann Ressach in one of the Uí Cairbre (ancestral to O'Donovan and other families) pedigrees preserved in the Book of Glendalough (this particular entry having been copied from the lost Psalter of Cashel).

== Reerasta Rath ==
It is possible that the Ráth called Reerasta, where was found the internationally famous Ardagh Chalice (Hoard) in western County Limerick, is a corruption of Rí Ressad.

== See also ==
- Ardagh Fort
