= Cathal mac Donnubáin =

Irish royal, 10th-11th centuries

Cathal mac Donnubáin is the second known son of Donnubán mac Cathail, king of Uí Fidgenti and an ancestor of the medieval and modern O'Donovan family. He may have succeeded his brother Uainide mac Donnubáin as King of Uí Chairpre Áebda (Cairbre Eva) at his death in 982, no ruler(s) being known after that until 1014. However, this is confused by two notices of the death of Cairpre mac Cléirchín in 1013 or 1014, wherein one he is styled king of Uí Chairpre and in the other of Uí Fidgenti, leaving it uncertain which Cathal might actually have been if either. The rivalry between the two families is unknown but cannot be ruled out.

== Clontarf ==
Cathal led the forces and is styled king of the Uí Chairpre in the Battle of Clontarf in 1014, in the account of the Leabhar Oiris, which is believed to be based at least in part on contemporary documents. There it is said he fought on the side of Brian Bóruma, High King of Ireland in the great central division commanded by Cian mac Máelmuaid, standing against the forces of Leinster commanded by Máel Mórda mac Murchada, King of Leinster. He is not listed among the slain there. That he participated in the battle is also an O'Donovan tradition. Cathal's mention in the Leabhar Oiris is the only one found anywhere outside of an O'Donovan pedigree in all surviving sources. Not anywhere in the annals is he mentioned.

What is unknown is how early Cathal was listed in or before the Leabhar Oiris, because what has survived is a later compilation of earlier sources where the spelling has been changed to Early Modern Irish. He is listed as Cathal mac Donnabháin rí Ó g-Cairbre, whereas Cathal mac Donnubáin, rí h-Ua Cairpre would be contemporary.

== Family ==
It is possible that Cathal was as much as three-quarters Norse in ancestry. His maternal grandfather was probably Ivar of Limerick, the last Norse king of Limerick and an ally of his father. Donnubán himself has also been argued to have had a Norse mother, a daughter of one Amlaíb, rí Gall Muman or Olaf, king of the Norse of Munster, possibly referring to Amlaíb Cenncairech. It was also assumed by John O'Donovan that Cathal married a Norse woman himself, because he's only known issue is Amlaíb ua Donnubáin. A now lost source of uncertain date makes the entirely plausible claim that his son fought at Clontarf under Cian, although this is possibly a mistake for Cathal himself, or both may have.

Cathal's pedigree can be tentatively reconstructed as follows below, assuming he actually existed. If not then it could be the O'Donovan family actually descend from Uainide mac Donnubáin, who is mentioned dying in 982 in the Annals of Inisfallen. But notably, both appear to be namesakes of earlier generations, at least in the received tradition, and in fact one Uainide mac Cathail appears as a mid-10th-century king of Uí Chairpre in the 12th-century propaganda tract Caithréim Chellacháin Chaisil. Donnchadh Ó Corráin has questioned his historicity but does not doubt he is meant to represent the early O'Donovan kindred. Although Ó Corráin does not say so explicitly this is because no "Uainide mac Cathail" appears in the annals, and thus he could be created out of his own namesakes. The Uí Chairpre are nevertheless mentioned several times in CCC in different roles, probably indicating the family were still of some prominence in the first decades of the 12th century, even if they are noted for nothing during this period in the annals, which are importantly very incomplete, abbreviated and badly lacunose (suffering from gaps).

Uainide mac Donnubáin [son of Donnubán mac Cathail] became King of Uí Chairpre Áebda, from 979 to his death in 982. The second son Cathal mac Donnubháin, succeeded his brother as King of Uí Chairpre Áebda in 982. Cathal Donnubáin married a Norse woman [a daughter of one Amlaíb, rí Gall Muman or Olaf, king of the Norse of Munster] and they had a son Amlaíb (Olaf) Ua Donnubáin and a second son Ímar (Ivor) Ua Donnubáin. Cathal king of the Uí Chairpre survived the Battle of Clontarf in 1014, which resulted in large losses for both Irish and Norse. Amlaíb (Olaf) Ua Donnubáin succeeded his father, Cathal mac Donnubháin, as King of Uí Chairpre Áebda.

Ivar of Waterford is believed to have been Cathal/Uainide's brother-in-law, married to an unnamed sister of theirs. One of Waterford's very historical sons he named Donndubán, with certainty after their father. It has in the past been popularly claimed that some modern O'Donovans actually descend from this marriage, but this remains unverified.

Ancestors of Cathal mac Donnubáin

(Cathal)
(Uainide)
Cathal
Donnubán
Amlaíb Cenncairech ?
Ingen (daughter)
Cathal / Uainide
Ivar Ragnarsson ?
at least two generations
Ivar of Limerick
Ingen (daughter)
