= Donnubán mac Cathail =

Irish ruler (??–980)

Donnubán ('donuva:n), Donndubán ('donðuva:n), or Donnabán mac Cathail, anglicised Donovan, son of Cahall (died 980), was a tenth-century ruler of the Irish regional kingdom of Uí Fidgenti, and possibly also of the smaller overkingdom of Uí Chairbre Áebda within that. In contemporary sources he is only named king of the former, but his sons and later descendants appear as dynasts of the latter. In addition, at his death in 980 Donovan is styled King of Ressad, a unique title in the surviving Irish annals, and the identity of which place is uncertain. He is the progenitor of the medieval and modern O'Donovan family.

Playing a notable role in the early twelfth century fictional political saga Cogad Gáedel re Gallaib (CGG), Donovan is notorious for his alliance with his apparent father-in-law or at least relation Ivar of Limerick, the last Norse king of Limerick, and with Máel Muad mac Brain, king of Desmond, against the rising Dál gCais in the persons of Mathgamain mac Cennétig, king of Cashel, and his famous brother Brian Bóruma, later High King of Ireland. The latter would prove the victors, altering the political landscape of Munster and Ireland forever. It was Donovan's assistance that made Máel Muad King of Munster from 976 to 978.

== Accession and pedigree ==
The lineage of Donovan as set forth by John O'Donovan in the Appendix to the Annals of the Four Masters positions Donovan as the senior descendant of Oilioll Olum (d. 234 A.D.), and ultimately, the senior descent of the race of Heber. Such a lofty claim attracts considerable scrutiny, and Donovan's lineage suffers criticism as possibly missing a number of generations. It has been argued by one scholar, Donnchadh Ó Corráin, to possibly be a fabrication intended to link the Donovan dynasty to the Uí Chairpre Áebda, although Ó Corráin grudgingly allows that the pedigree may be syncopated. The genealogy of the ÚA CAIRPRI is set forth in Rawlinson B 502, an 11th-century manuscript, from Oilioll Olum to Cenn Faelad, who died approximately 744 A.D. It would appear that Donovan's grandfather, Uainide mac Cathail, is poorly documented, and undocumented in contemporary sources, appearing in the 12th century Caithréim Chellacháin Chaisil, and in records compiled in the 14th–16th centuries as being the grandson of Cenn Fáelad. Generally, five generations of descent will encompass more than 250 years. Other manuscripts have an additional two generations of descent during the 744 to 977 period. Ó Corráin's research does demonstrate that Donovan's ancestry was far from certain only a two hundred years after his death in 977. However, the author of the Caithréim had available to him an extensive collection of official Munster pedigrees and his inclusion of known historical figures for purposes of giving credibility to his propaganda tract would indicate the existence of the individuals.

Donnuban's accession to the kingship of Uí Fidgenti appears to be referred to in the mid 10th century Betha Adamnáin. But in this passage the acceding prince in Uí Fidgenti is actually said to belong to the Uí Echach Muman, another name for the Eóganacht Raithlind, an entirely separate dynasty from the southern region of Munster (Desmond), but curiously the one to which Máel Muad mac Brain, Donovan's close ally, happens to belong. With the recent collapse of the Eóganacht Chaisil the Uí Echach or Eóganacht Raithlind were the most powerful of all the Eóganachta remaining at this time. The prominent appearance of the Uí Fidgenti at the same time was undoubtedly related. In any case the passage in Betha Adamnáin is:

Tall dano Adamnan righe ar Flait[h]be do chenuil mac nErca for hUibh Fidgenti, et ar a cloind go brath, et dosratt do chenuil Laippe do hUibh Eachach Muman ar orguin do Dunghal mac Ferccusa. / And he [Adamnan] took the kingship over the Hy Fidgenti from Flaithbe of the race of the sons of Erc and from his children for ever, and gave it to the race of Laippe of the Hy Echach of Munster, because he had slain Dungal son of Fergus.

However, Herbert and Ó Riain believe this is an error, because the Uí Chairpre themselves also descend from a Laippe, and so they conclude Donovan belonged to a sept known as the Ceinél Laippe or Uí Laippe. Thus the passage can actually be used to support his descent from the Uí Chairpre. Notably both of his known sons are described as kings of Uí Chairpre. The Uí Echach may appear either for the above reason, namely Donovan's close association with Máel Muad, or because of influence from another part of the text, or because the name Laippe was found in their dynasty as well. None of this necessarily proves his descent from the early medieval Uí Chairpre but simply associates Donovan's family with the later kingship of their territories in the 10th century. There is no doubt however, regarding his classification as a member of the Ui Fidghente, as he is noted as king of the Ui Fidghente in a number of instances (see below).

MacCotter argues Donovan belonged to the Uí Mac Eirc, an early sept of Uí Cairbre possibly giving their name to Kinellerc, the territory surrounding Adare, further noting that another Eirc is a direct ancestor of Donovan. Another early known location of the O'Donovans was at Croom, where in the 1130s they are mentioned in the Caithréim Chellacháin Chaisil, an epic describing both its contemporary and 10th century Munster.

That Donovan's wife was the daughter of Ivar of Limerick has long been the oral (an perhaps once written) tradition of the family. Regardless of this, it has been argued that Donovan's mother was also Norse based on his father's other associations, by the 3rd Earl of Dunraven, who argued that his father Cathal's association through marriage with "Amlaf, king of the Danes of Munster" officially created the alliance between them. Something of this sort might even be hinted at in a 14th-century official pedigree, the earliest surviving, reprinted by Cú Choigcríche Ó Cléirigh in the early-mid 17th century, where his own father is given as Amlaíb (mac Cathail). The most commonly accepted genealogy is given by John O'Donovan.

In spite of all this controversy, the O'Donovan family belong to the Y-DNA clade R-Z16259, which they share with the Collins, Reagans, and O'Heas (Hayes), all documented either Uí Fidgenti, Corcu Loígde or both. In any event these are both septs of the Dáirine, although the Uí Fidgenti have also been classified relations of the Eóganachta, who have in fact been revealed close relations of the Dáirine under R-A541. This was already expected by a minority in Irish scholarship.

== Sulcoit ==
It is impossible to prove that Donovan was among those opposing the Dál gCais at the Battle of Sulcoit. According to CGG both Máel Muad and he did support Ivar there, but the annals unfortunately offer no confirmation and no details.

AI967.2: A defeat of the foreigners of Luimnech by Mathgamain, son of Cennétig, at Sulchuait, and Luimnech was burned by him before noon on the following day.

== Capture of Mathgamain ==
The "new" alliance formed between Ivar, Donovan, and Máel Muad alarmed Mathgamain greatly. Máel Muad had preceded him as King of Munster until deposed around 970, and naturally very much wanted to reclaim the kingdom for himself and for the distressed and disorderly Eóganachta. Also, by the Dál gCais' own confession Mathgamain was committing repeated depredations throughout Munster, and thus had probably become persona non-grata throughout much of the province. The author of CGG further claims Mathgamain took hostages from Donovan at this time, but this is rejected by the antiquarian Canon John O'Mahony, noting subsequent events.

For a now unknown purpose, Mathgamain agreed to meet with the allies, with Donovan's house chosen as the place for the meeting, possibly because he was perceived to be the most neutral, or because Mathgamain may have hoped to detach him from the alliance. According to Alice Stopford Green this act of going into a probable enemy's house was "the formal sign of submission and renouncing supremacy", and it may have been understood that from there he was to go on to yield allegiance to Máel Muad. Such speculation is extremely unlikely, given Mathgamain's success over a 15-year period of raiding into the territories of Bran and Donovan, and the military strength of his forces and those of his brother, Brian. Today's records do not fully illuminate the events of that day, and the political tides and developing relationships and commerce between the Danes and the Irish, and so the reason for the meeting has been lost. The following annals report Donovan's decision at the meeting regarding his promise of safety to his adversary:

AI972.3[976]: The capture of Mathgamain son of Cennétig, king of Caisel. He was treacherously seized by Donnuban and handed over to the son of Bran in violation of the guarantee and despite the interdiction of the elders of Mumu, and he was put to death by Bran's son.

AT976.2: Mathghamhain son of Cennédigh, king of Munster, was killed by Maelmuadh son of Bran, king of the Uí Eachach, having been treacherously delivered up by Donnabhán son of Cathal, king of the Uí Fidgente.

CS976: Mathgamain son of Cendétigh, king of Mumu, was killed by Maelmuad son of Bran, the king of Uí Echach, after he had been handed over by Dondubán son of Cathal, king of Uí Fidgente, in treachery.

AFM974.9[976]: Mathghamhain, son of Ceinneidigh, supreme King of all Munster, was treacherously taken prisoner by Donnabhan, son of Cathal, lord of Ui-Fidhgeinte, who delivered him up to Maelmhuaidh, son of Bran, lord of Desmond, who put him to death, against the protection of saints and just men.

The last, from the Annals of the Four Masters, is the latest in date, and in it both Máel Muad and Donovan have been demoted to the rank of lords, whereas Mathgamain is made "supreme King of all Munster". He certainly was not this and was never at any time greater than semi-nominal overlord with substantial opposition. The spectacular success of his younger brother Brian becoming a genuine monarch of Munster and eventually Ireland, had a powerful influence on the minds of later historians. It was Mathgamain's fate to pave the way.

Also of interest is the claim made by the author of CGG that he was taken prisoner as a result of Ivar's interference with Donovan, not Máel Muad's. While unsupported by the brief annals this is supported by Donovan's close association with the Limerick dynasty, and Canon O'Mahony has pointed out that Máel Muad was a considerable distance away at the time, making his way north from his stronghold in Desmond. His argument that all of this removes Máel Muad from the plot may or may not be refuted in principle by the fact he quickly received word of the prisoner and ordered him put to death.

== Final battles and death ==
The sources somewhat disagree on the manner and date of Donovan's death. According to the writer of CGG Brian went on an expedition into Uí Fidgenti against both Donovan and the newly elected king of the Norse of Munster Aralt (Harald), who is given as a third son of Ivar. There, according to CGG, the two were killed in the Battle of Cathair Cuan, presumably referring to a fortress of Donovan's, together with a great number of foreigners or Norse/Danes:

Then Donnabhán invited Aralt, the son of Imar, unto him, after his father had been killed, and the foreigners of Mumhain made him king. He [Brian] went afterwards on a foray into Ui Fidhgenti, and they took cattle innumerable; and they plundered Cathair Cuan, and they killed its people; and they killed Donnabhán, son of Cathal, the ripe culprit, the king of Ui Fidhgenti; and they killed Aralt, son of Imar, king of the foreigners, and they made a prodigious slaughter of the foreigners, and they carried away with them cattle innumerable. This was the second year after the killing of Mathgamhain.

But the Annals of the Four Masters, containing a record of this possibly identical battle, do not mention the death of Donovan, nor even mention Harald at all:

M976.9[978]: A battle was gained by Brian, son of Ceinneidigh, over the foreigners of Luimneach, and Donnabhan, son of Cathal, lord of Ui-Fidhgeinte, wherein the foreigners of Luimneach were defeated and slaughtered. / Cath-raoineadh ria m-Brian, mac Ceinnéittigh for Gallaibh Luimnigh, & for Donnabhán, mac Cathail, tigherna Ua Fidhgeinnte, dú i t-torcratar Goill Luimnigh, & in ro ladh a n-ár.

It is unclear if the Annals of Inisfallen refer to the same or a different event the previous year, but here they do not mention Donovan:

AI977.3: A raid by Brian, son of Cennétig, on Uí Fhidgeinte, and he made a slaughter of foreigners therein.

In any case, these two accounts support the claims of the O'Donovans in their pedigrees that Donovan survived the battle with Brian. These state that he was killed later in the "battle of Croma" against Dunchuan mac Cennétig, a brother of Brian, and was assisted by the troops of Curradh-an-Roe or Curra the Red and the Corcu Baiscinn, many of whom were slain on the field. However these accounts, as well as the one given by John Collins of Myross, and the one found in the Dublin Annals of Inisfallen, state that Donovan's Norse companion was Auliffe (Olaf), whose parentage is not given. These last two also disagree with the above in stating that Donovan and his Norse companion were killed here. According to the first:

A.D. 977: Brian, son of Kennedy, marched at the head of an army to Ibh-Fighenti, where he was met by Donovan, dynast of that territory, in conjunction with Auliff, king of the Danes of Munster. Brian gave them battle, wherein Auliff and his Danes, and Donovan and his Irish forces, were all cut off.

Collins of Myross took his own account from an apparently now lost source:

Donovan, who was well acquainted with the personal abilities and spirit of Brian, Mahon's brother, who now succeeded him as king of North Munster, took into his pay, besides his own troops, fifteen hundred heavy-armed Danes, commanded by Avlavius, a Danish soldier of great experience. Brian, in the Spring of 976(8), entered Kenry, where, at Crome, he gave battle, in which Donovan, Avlavius, and their party, were cut to pieces.

Finally, both these accounts, that of CGG, and possibly those in the pedigrees, may all be contradicted by a notice in the Annals of Inisfallen in 980, leaving only the above account in the Annals of the Four Masters and brief notice in the Annals of Inisfallen completely accurate. Here, curiously, no cause of death is given:

AI980.2: Death of Donnubán, king of Ress. / Bás Dondubain, ríg Ressad.{folio 18d}

Concerning the above accounts, the Dublin Annals of Inisfallen are a frequently unreliable 18th century compilation and the source used by Collins is of unknown date, while the earliest account of Donovan's slaying by Brian's army is found in the early 12th century CGG, written over 120 years after the alleged events. The remaining sources offer no confirmation.

As Donovan was evidently still alive in 978 he may have supported Máel Muad in the fateful Battle of Belach Lechta, but this is nowhere recorded. No details of this battle, besides his ally's death, are known for certain, nor even its location.

== Territory ==
The identity of Ress or Ressad is uncertain. According to Paul MacCotter it is "apparently an archaic name for Uí Chairpre or one of its divisions." Noting that Donovan's son Uainide is styled king of Uí Chairpre at his death two years later in 982, MacCotter states "Clearly, Uí Dhonnabháin must have been local kings of... Uí Chairpre Íochtarach." This was the northeasternmost local petty kingdom or túath within Uí Fidgenti and was adjacent to Norse Limerick, a considerable portion of the surrounding settlement of the same name apparently lying within Donovan's own native kingdom. Directly cross the River Shannon to the north could be found Brian's own sept of the Dál gCais, namely the Uí Tairdelbaich or Uí Blait.

=== Occupied? ===
According to the author of CGG the Uí Chairpre/Uí Dhonnabháin were in "occupation" of territory he claims actually belonged to the Dál gCais, namely "... Caille Cormaic, from Oclan to Luimnech, and from Cnam-Coill to Luachair." This region has been difficult to identify, but it apparently stretched east into the modern neighbouring County Tipperary, Cnam-Coill being found a mile or mile and a half east of Tipperary itself. Oclan or Hoclan has not been identified but presumably was to the north of this.

== Marriage(s) and issue ==
It is the oral tradition of the family that Donovan married a daughter of his ally Ivar of Limerick, although two alternatives exist, each with support. The first is that she was actually the daughter of the later (2nd) Amlaíb/Olaf mentioned above, himself possibly identical with Olaf son of Ivar of Limerick, who was killed along with his father in 977 but who may simply have replaced Aralt in the later accounts of the following battles. Clearly, there was a Danish influence on Donovan, as descendants of Donovan bore Danish names for more than three hundred years, including Amlaíb Ua Donnubáin, who was slain in 1201. In addition, based on naming conventions in the 10th century, it is assumed that Donovan (son of Ivar of Waterford) who was slain in 996, would have been named after his mother's brother, thus making Donovan (slain 977) his uncle. It is possible, that Ivar of Waterford was married to Donovan's daughter, or he could have been married to his sister; a conclusion can not be formed as the ages of the individuals is unknown, and classification into generations is not possible.

In any case Donovan's known children were

- Uainide ("Greenish") mac Donnubáin, king of Uí Chairpre (died 982)
  - other children?
- Cathal mac Donnubáin, possibly also king of Uí Chairpre or Uí Fidgenti
  - Amlaíb ua Donnubáin
    - O'Donovan family
- Daughter (or sister) of Donnubáin, assumed to have married Ivar of Waterford
  - Donndubán mac Ímair (slain 996)
    - other O'Donovans? – once commonly believed, but so far unproven.
  - other children

Unfortunately no account at all is preserved of the nature of the connection, beyond intermarriage, between Norse Waterford and the O'Donovan family. The name Ragnall is likely to have entered the latter, where it became popular, from the former, where it seems to have been dynastic.

== In fiction and popular history ==
Donovan makes a number of appearances in Morgan Llywelyn's New York Times best-selling novel Lion of Ireland (1980). Here is mistakenly called king of "Hy Carbery" (Uí Chairpre), which he is never called in contemporary sources. This mistake is also common in many popular histories. Brian Boru is still immensely popular today and so Donovan has the misfortune of appearing as the O'Brian family's most notorious native adversary in numerous popular accounts over the centuries.

== Notes ==
Regnal titles
Preceded by Scandlán ua Riacáin	King of Uí Fidgenti; 962–980	Succeeded by Cairpre mac Cléirchín ?
Preceded by Flaithrí mac Allamarain ?	King of Ressad; 967–980	Unknown
