= Crom Ua Donnubáin =

Irish dynast

An Crom Ua Donnubáin or Crom O'Donovan (slain 1254) is the individual characterised as the ancestor of O'Donovans later found in Carbery in County Cork, and later still in distant County Wexford in Leinster. Nothing is known for sure of his life but his progeny, and the circumstances of his slaying and further events which followed. He was the son of Máel Ruanaid, (son of Ragnall), son of Aneislis, son of Murchad, son of Amlaíb, son of Cathal, son of Donnubán, (son of Amlaíb), son of Cathal. An uncle or near relation was Amlaíb Ua Donnubáin, last known king of Uí Chairpre Áebda (Cairbre Eva), slain in 1201.

== Events and context ==
The compilation of primarily Munster annals known as Mac Carthaigh's Book, collected by the celebrated Prince and historian Florence MacCarthy, reports the events several years after Crom's death as follows:

MCB1259.1: A.D. 1259. Fínghin Reanna Róin son of Domhnall God Cairbreach [Mac Carthaigh] and the Uí Dhonnabháin killed Mac Craith son of Diarmaid son of Donnchadh na hImirce Timchill [Ó Mathghamhna] in retribution for the slaying of An Crom [Ó Donnabháin] at Inis Béil Átha Dos by the Uí Eachach, about a cowherds' brawl.

This Fínghin Reanna Róin is none other than Fínghin Mac Carthaigh, King of Desmond, who two years later would be the victor at the Battle of Callann, and whose father Donal Gott MacCarthy, also King of Desmond, was the founder of the MacCarthy Reagh dynasty, Princes of Carbery. The Ó Mathghamhna and Uí Echach are the powerful O'Mahonys, Kings of Eóganacht Raithlind.

== Name or epithet ==
An Crom translates directly from the Irish into The Bent (One), recalling memories of the infamous deity Crom Cruach. However, in this case the source is probably Cromad, name for the bend in the River Maigue becoming the modern Croom, County Limerick. Crom is claimed in the O'Donovan pedigrees to have been seated here and built a great fortress, although this was more likely built by his ancestor/relation Diarmaid O'Donovan. It is the origin also of the war cry "Crom Abu" of the Kildare branch of the FitzGerald dynasty, who are said to have taken the fortress from Crom.

== Issue ==
His wife or wives are unknown. The following list, down to the Elizabethan period, sets forth Ancrom's descendants. Through the seventh generation from him, the descendants are as listed by Peregrine Clery and Duald MacFirbis, writing in 1632 and 1650, respectively. Generations 8 through 11 are as set forth by John O'Donovan, in his Appendix to the Annals of the Four Masters. The listing is at odds with other published pedigrees of Clan Cathail, which may be examined by referring to Richard F. Cronnelly's Irish Family History, and which drew upon the genealogy approved by General Richard O'Donovan (d. 1829), a direct descendant of Donal of the Hides (11th generation, below). Cronnelly disputed the synthesized pedigree compiled in the Appendix of Annals of the Four Masters, noting that Donal of the Hides' pedigree was very incorrectly given from the Book of MacFirbis by John O'Donovan.

- Cathal
  - Tadg
    - Murchad, Lord of Clancahill
      - Rickard, Lord of Clancahill
      - Conchobar
        - Ragnall
          - (Diarmaid)
            - Diarmaid
              - Domhnall
              - Tadhg
                - Donal of the Hides, Lord of Clancahill, died 1584
                  - Diarmaid, slain 1581
                  - Other sons
                  - Donal II O'Donovan, last inaugurated Lord of Clancahill, died 1639
                  - Tadhg/Teige
          - Tioboit, from whom the Sliocht Tioboid
        - Murtogh
          - Aengus
        - Diarmaid, Lord of Clancahill
    - Ragnall
      - Domhnall
      - Melaghlin
      - Diarmaid
    - Conchobar
      - Aed
        - Dermott
          - Donough
  - Ímar Ua Donnubáin, from whom the Sliocht Íomhair. Head of the entire family?
    - Máol Íosa mac Íomhair
- Aneslis, had four sons, their descendants all belonging to the Sliocht Aineislis mhic an Chroim
  - Donnchad Mor
  - Rickard
  - Walter
  - Ragnall
- Lochlann
  - Donnchad of Loch Crott, ancestor of Clann Lochlainn or Clan Loughlin/Clanloughlin
    - Cathal
      - Diarmaid
        - Donnchadh, after whom the pedigree of the Lords of Clanloughlin becomes confused for three or four generations
          - (Conchobhar)
            - (Aedh)
              - (Diarmaid)
                - (Donnchadh)
                  - Domhnall na Cartan Ó Donnabháin, Lord of Clanloughlin
                    - Domhnall Og na Cartan Ó Donnabháin, Lord of Clanloughlin, died 1629

Of the remaining published septs, the Sliocht Raghnaill and Sliocht Diarmada Rua are impossible to place exactly above because of the multiple occurrences of the names, while the later sept of O'Donovan's Cove are believed to descend from a near kinsman of Donal of the Hides. Finally the Sliocht Taidhg Mhic Niocaill and Clann Chonghalaigh, both also found within O'Donovan territory, possibly represent unrecorded generations.
