= Battle of Cathair Cuan =

977–978 battle in Munster in Ireland

Date	977/8
Location	County Limerick
Result	Dalcassian victory

Belligerents
Uí Fidgenti; Kingdom of Limerick	Dalcassians

Commanders and leaders
Donovan MacCahall; Harald Ivarsson †	Brian Boru

Strength
Unknown	Unknown

Casualties and losses
Unknown	Unknown

The Battle of Cathair Cuan refers to a perhaps extended conflict fought in or between 977 and 978, or simply to a single battle in one or the other year, in Munster in Ireland. Attacking were Brian Bóruma and the Dál gCais, while defending were Donnubán mac Cathail and the remainder of the Viking army of Limerick. The latter were probably the followers of the newly elected and final King of the Foreigners of Munster Harald Ivarsson, son of the recently slain Ivar of Limerick, although it is possible Donnubán was in overall command.

Brian and the Dál gCais were victorious, with the result that the Limerick lordship and its territories were decisively lost to the Gaels until the Norman invasion of Ireland. Much had already been lost to the Dál gCais by 977, probably including the great dún of Limerick itself, but the lordship included other territories, some a number of miles inland, and the Norse-Irish themselves appear to have briefly remained viable in these. Aralt was probably slain in the conflict but Donnubán seems to have survived. Later accounts state he also was killed.

== Annalistic accounts ==
According to the Annals of Inisfallen:

AI977.3: A raid by Brian, son of Cennétig, on Uí Fhidgeinte, and he made a slaughter of foreigners [Norse-Irish] therein.

According to the Annals of the Four Masters:

AFM976.9[978]: A battle was gained by Brian, son of Ceinneidigh, over the foreigners of Luimneach, and Donnabhan, son of Cathal, lord [king] of Ui-Fidhgeinte, wherein the foreigners of Luimneach were defeated and slaughtered.

According to the early 12th century Cogad Gáedel re Gallaib:

Then Donnabhán invited Aralt, the son of Imar, unto him, after his father had been killed, and the foreigners of Mumhain made him king. He [Brian] went afterwards on a foray into Ui Fidhgenti, and they took cattle innumerable; and they plundered Cathair Cuan, and they killed its people; and they killed Donnabhán, son of Cathal, the ripe culprit, the king of Ui Fidhgenti; and they killed Aralt, son of Imar, king of the foreigners, and they made a prodigious slaughter of the foreigners, and they carried away with them cattle innumerable. This was the second year [978] after the killing of Mathgamhain.

The 18th century compilation known as the Dublin Annals of Inisfallen report another tradition of uncertain provenance. Here Aralt has been replaced by a certain Olaf, possibly his brother, who was actually killed a little before along with his father Ivar and third brother Dubcenn, on Inis Cathaig in 977.

A.D. 977: Brian, son of Kennedy, marched at the head of an army to Ibh-Fighenti, where he was met by Donovan, dynast of that territory, in conjunction with Auliff, king of the Danes of Munster. Brian gave them battle, wherein Auliff and his Danes, and Donovan and his Irish forces, were all cut off.

One final source, now lost but used by John Collins of Myross in the late 18th or early 19th century, reports:

Donovan, who was well acquainted with the personal abilities and spirit of Brian, Mahon's brother, who now succeeded him as king of North Munster, took into his pay, besides his own troops, fifteen hundred heavy-armed Danes, commanded by Avlavius, a Danish soldier of great experience. Brian, in the Spring of 976[978], entered Kenry, where, at Crome, he gave battle, in which Donovan, Avlavius, and their party, were cut to pieces.

Croom Castle was in fact a principal fortress of the O'Donovan family in the 12th century but it is unknown how early they came into possession of the stretch of the River Maigue on which it is located. Possibly Collins was making an assumption but this is unverifiable. A form of the name Cathair Cuan survived at least as late as the year 1200, where it appears in a Norman survey of the region as Cathircuain, which unfortunately cannot be associated with any known modern site.
