= Donnchad mac Cellacháin =

Donnchad mac Cellacháin (fl. 961–963) was a son of Cellachan of Cashel who is alleged to have briefly ruled as King of Cashel and Munster from 961 until 963, when he was murdered by his brother.

Although in some popular accounts he is succeeded immediately by Mathgamain mac Cennétig of the Dál gCais, the latter was not "full" king of Munster until around the year 970, as admitted in a Dál gCais source, the Cogad Gaedel re Gallaib.

It is possible that Máel Muad mac Brain of the Eóganacht Raithlind actually claimed the overkingship in Munster as early as 959, and so if actually king at all Donnchad may only have been titular king of Cashel itself.
