= Ivar of Waterford =

Norse king

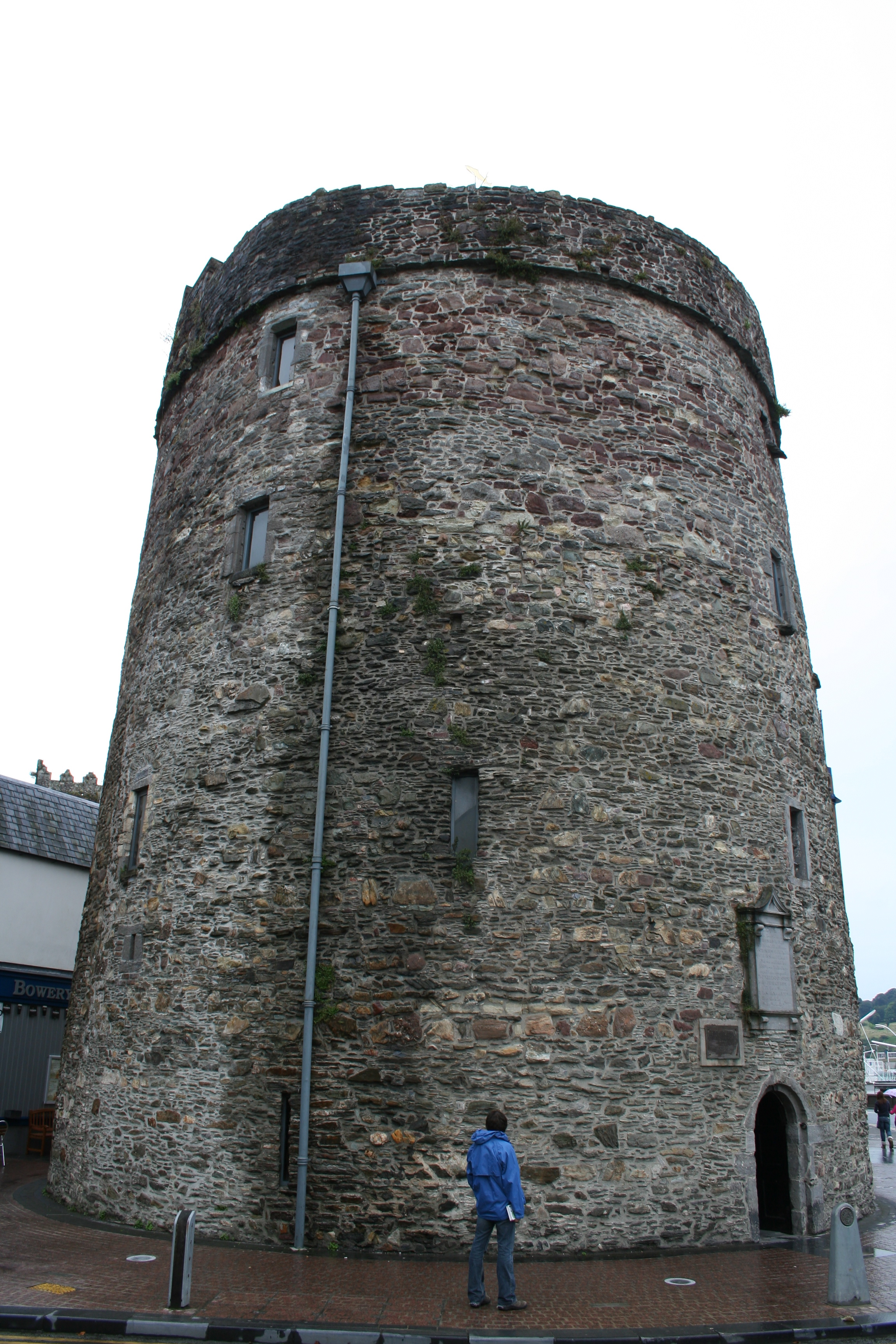
Reginald's Tower in Waterford, believed to have been built by one of Ivar's children or descendants. The topmost part is of later Norman construction.

Ivar of Waterford (Irish: Ímar, rí Puirt Láirgi; Old Norse: Ívarr [ˈiːˌwɑrː]; died 1000) was the Norse king of Waterford from at least 969 until his death in the year 1000, and also reigned as King of Dublin, possibly from 989 to 993, and certainly again for less than a year between 994 and 995, returning after his expulsion from the city in 993 by Sigtrygg Silkbeard, who would expel him for good the next time.

Like his relation and contemporary Ivar of Limerick, and with whom he may actually be confused in one or two instances, Ivar's parentage is a little uncertain. However Clare Downham argues that his claim to Dublin and the names of his sons and grandsons suggest he did belong to the Uí Ímair dynasty. In 1867 James Henthorn Todd suggested him as a son of another Ímar, slain in battle against Ruaidrí ua Canannáin in 950, and assumed to be a son of the powerful Ragnall ua Ímair, King of Northumbria, who occupied Waterford and raided Munster from it in the second decade of the 10th century before moving on to take Scandinavian York. Ivar of Waterford had children and grandchildren also named Ragnall. Mary Valante agrees with Todd.

== Career ==
Ivar had a long and active career, and is first noted in 969 allied with, among several other parties, Mathgamain mac Cennétig of Dál gCais, to defend the Osraige against an attack by Murchad mac Finn, King of Leinster. His activities are then unknown (in the surviving sources) for over a decade, but following the retirement and death of Amlaíb Cuarán, King of Dublin in 980–1, Alex Woolf argues Ivar could have been assuming the role of leader of the Norse-Irish resistance to Máel Sechnaill mac Domnaill, who had defeated Amlaíb in the Battle of Tara in 980 and to whom Amlaíb's son Glúniairn and the Kingdom of Dublin were now subordinate. In 982 Ivar plundered Kildare in Máel Sechnaill's territory. Next year he joined forces with the King of Leinster Domnall Claen in a major battle against Máel Sechnaill and Glúniairn, in which his side suffered a rout and many were slain, with his son Gilla Pátraic and others of distinction among the dead. Máel Sechnaill then ravaged Leinster. A year later in 984 Ivar appears to have entered into an alliance with Brian Bóruma (successor of Mathgamain), and with the brothers Maccus and Gofraid mac Arailt, Kings of Mann and the Isles, turning from his alliance with Leinster to agree to attack both that kingdom and Dublin. According to Clare Downham, "their combined armies ravaged through the province but do not appear to have reached Dublin". She also suggests that Ivar's dynasty's long alliance with Dál gCais may have aided Brian in his later quest to dominate Ireland, and offers evidence of a similar long alliance with the Osraige.

Nine years later in 993 he is reported in the Annals of Inisfallen as being expelled from Dublin, possibly after having reigned there from 989 after Glúniairn's death, by Glúniairn's brother Sigtrygg Silkbeard, although according to the Annals of the Four Masters this was achieved "through the intercession of the saints". A year or two later in 994 or 995 Ivar is noted for expelling Sigtrygg from the kingship, but he would only reign for a short time as Silkbeard returned to force him out later in 995. However, the Annals of Clonmacnoise report the sequence of events a little differently, saying "Hymer raigned in Dublin after Awley. Randolphe [Ivar's son] was killed by the Leinstermen, Hymer was put to flight and Gittrick was king of Dublin in his place.", ignoring the reign of Glúniairn. Ivar is attested in no other source in Dublin so early and the account may be confused.

His last known activity was a raid into Uí Cheinnselaig in Leinster in 998, where his army lost some men and the greater part of their horses. The annals report him dying two years later, but do not mention the cause.

According to Geoffrey Keating in his circa 1634 History of Ireland, which is based on the annals and other sources, Ivar at some point in his career joined forces with Domnall mac Fáelain, King of the Déisi Muman, to invade the province of Munster, and they plundered the greater part of it before being defeated by Brian Bóruma, who burned Waterford in retaliation. No mention is made of any previous or following alliance between Ivar and the Dál Cais.

Outside Ireland and returning to the early 980s, Alex Woolf suggests Ivar may have engaged in a number of raids in southwestern England which are reported in the Anglo-Saxon Chronicle. These entries mention no leader specifically but he was the most active Norse-Irish ruler at the time.

== Family ==
Again, Ivar was very likely a grandson of Ragnall ua Ímair, although the precise line of descent is uncertain, and the middle generation, that of the "Imhar, Tanist of the foreigners" slain in a major battle against Ruaidrí ua Canannáin in 950, is only an educated guess made by Todd and followed by Valante.

The names of Ivar's wife or wives are unknown but one was likely the daughter of Donnubán mac Cathail, king of Uí Fidgenti, and whose mother was probably by a daughter of Ivar of Limerick. Another may have been a daughter of an Osraige dynast, possibly Gilla Pátraic mac Donnchada, king of Osraige.

His known descendants were:

- Gilla Pátraic (died 983) – name suggests association with the Osraige as well as Christian identity Events indicate that Gilla Pátraic mac Donnchada (died 996), was a relation of one of Ivar's wives, as this king of Osraige was slain by Ivar's son Donndubán (who was slain one week later in retaliation) and Domnall mac Faelain, king of the Déisi.
- Ragnall (died 995)
- Donndubán (died 996) – an extremely rare name, and given the Irish practice of naming first-born sons after their oldest uncle, possibly a nephew of Donndubán mac Cathail. According to a tradition of uncertain provenance which made itself into the Encyclopædia Britannica for several decades, Donndubán mac Ímair, along with his relative Donndubán mac Cathail, are the eponymous ancestors of some of the modern O'Donovan family. No pedigree survives to assess the claim.
- Ragnall mac Ímair, king of Waterford (died 1018) – Ivar's successor
  - ? mac Ragnaill (died 1015)
  - Ragnall mac Ragnaill, king of Waterford (died 1035)
- Sihtric mac Ímair, king of Waterford (died 1022)

The complexities of the relationships of this group are illustrated by annal records, which noted:

Diarmaid, son of Domhnall, lord of Ui-Ceinnsealaigh, was killed by Donndubhan, son of Imhar, through treachery. Then, Gillaphadraig, son of Donnchadh, lord of Osraighe, was killed by Donndubhan, son of Imhar, and by Domhnall, son of Faelan, lord of the Deisi. Donndubhan, son of Imhar, was afterwards slain by the Leinstermen, namely, by Cuduiligh, son of Cinaedh, one of the Ui-Failghe, at the end of a week, in revenge of Diarmaid, son of Domhnall.

According to Seán Duffy, Ivar and his family engaged in a nearly century-long debilitating feud with the descendants of Amlaíb Cuarán, eventually resulting in the loss of control of Norse Dublin to the Irish Uí Cheinnselaig and Uí Briain dynasties, although this argument depends on whether or not Echmarcach mac Ragnaill was a descendant of Ivar. He argues Echmarcach was a son or grandson of one of the Ragnalls above (died 1018 or 1035). Benjamin Hudson has argued Echmarcach was not, and that his paternal grandfather was Gofraid mac Arailt. Colmán Etchingham agrees with Hudson while Alex Woolf has voiced (to Etchingham) agreement with Duffy. However Duffy has received his loudest support from Forte, Oram, and Pedersen in their recent title.

Depending on the interpretation of the surviving sources, Cacht ingen Ragnaill, Queen of Donnchad mac Briain and usually assumed to be a sister of Echmarcach, may or may not have been a granddaughter or great-granddaughter of Ivar. Echmarcach's daughter Mór, wife of Tadg Ua Briain, may have surviving descendants.

== See also ==
- List of rulers of Waterford

== Notes ==
n. 25. Clare Downham (2004, p. 89) states 'A son of Ímar, king of Waterford, in the late tenth century bore the name Gillaphátraic (†983). 77 This name was common in the royal dynasty of the Osraige. The name is indicative of Irish affinities as well as Christian identity. An alliance between Waterford and the Osraige is evidenced for 998, and it may be that Ímar enjoyed a long-term alliance with the Osraige which was strengthened by marriage'. There's no indication that she's claiming Gillaphátraic was *already* a common name in Osraige by 983, the implication seems to be that the name came to the Osraige royal dynasty as a result of a marriage alliance with Gillaphátraic of Waterford.

Regnal titles
Preceded by ?	King of Waterford ?–1000	Succeeded by Ragnall mac Ímair
Preceded by (Glúniairn); Sigtrygg Silkbeard	King of Dublin (989–993); 994–995	Succeeded by Sigtrygg Silkbeard
