= Ivar of Limerick =

Ímar Luimnich
- King of Hlymrek; King of the Foreigners
- Reign: c. 960 to 977
- Successor: Aralt mac Ímair (died 978)
- Died: 977; Inis Cathaig
- Issue: Amlaíb Cú Allaidh; Dubcenn; Aralt unknown daughter
- House: Uí Ímair
- Father: uncertain
- Mother: unknown

Ivar of Limerick (Irish: Ímar Luimnich, rí Gall; Ímar ua Ímair; Ard Rí Gall Muman ocus Gáedel; Íomhar Mór; Old Norse: Ívarr [ˈiːˌwɑrː]; died 977), was the last Norse king of the city-state of Limerick, and penultimate King of the Foreigners of Munster, reigning during the rise to power of the Dál gCais and the fall of the Eóganachta.

His repeated attempts to assert his authority in Limerick and the surrounding region and possibly over even the greater province of Munster itself earned him the most prominent role as antagonist in the first part of the early 12th century saga and political tract Cogad Gáedel re Gallaib, as an enemy of Mathgamain mac Cennétig, claimant to the title King of Munster, and his more famous younger brother and successor Brian Bóruma.

According to the author of the Cogad Gáedel re Gallaib, Ivar succeeded in establishing himself as King of Munster for a period in the 960s, until routed in the Battle of Sulcoit in 968, but this claim has long been doubted by scholars. He then appears to have returned only a year or two later and established himself in the region again in some capacity.

== The sources ==
The two main sources for the career of Ivar are the early 12th century Cogad Gáedel re Gallaib itself and what support it receives from the Annals of Inisfallen. Both are believed to have used as their primary source a now lost collection of annals of ultimately Chronicle of Ireland descent to which were added material of Munster concern.

Unfortunately, however, though the Cogad author made extensive use of these annals, as well as local sources also now lost, and also some contemporary poetry, his purpose was political and intended to glorify Brian Boru and the Dál gCais for the benefit of his descendant Muirchertach Ua Briain, so although in part annalistic it is also full of exaggerations, flowery language, and dubious passages of various origin. The major problem with the Annals of Inisfallen, on the other hand, is that they are a substantially abbreviated and otherwise edited redaction of the original and so actually preserve less ultimately reliable or contemporary coverage of Ivar in total than does the Cogad, with all its faults. The Annals of Inisfallen also suffer from a considerable lacuna or simply an empty gap containing no entries at all, for whatever reason, of two and a half critical years in Ivar's career, from mid-969 to the beginning of 972.

The third most important source for this period of Munster history are the Annals of the Four Masters, but they were compiled much later and are occasionally of doubtful reliability, suffering in some cases from interpolations, misplaced entries, and so on. They also cover little of Ivar himself and serve mostly for the major sources above to be checked against in places. A few other sources briefly mentioning Ivar survive but altogether these do not contribute much if anything to our knowledge of him. The Annals of Tigernach might have been of assistance but they no longer survive for over two centuries between 766 and 974.

== Pedigree ==
Ivar's patronym is not given in the Irish annals, which as mentioned above have survived very incomplete, but he is generally accepted as a member of the prolific Norse dynasty known to historians as the Uí Ímair or House of Ivar. In the Cogad and related texts he is called Ímar ua (h)Ímair or Ímar, grandson of Ímar, but this can also be read Ímar Ua hÍmair, the capitalization producing the surname meaning "Descendant of Ímar", not unique to him and apparently used by other members of the dynasty as well. His precise relation to the previous rulers of Limerick is uncertain, the last member of the dynasty in the city state and its last known king before him being Aralt mac Sitric, who died in 940 and is generally believed to have been a third son of the great Sihtric Cáech (died 927), king of Dublin and later king of Northumbria. The problem with Ivar being a literal grandson of Ímar I (died 873) is that he would simply have been incredibly old by the time of his death in 977. A previous namesake of Ímar I, namely Ímar ua Ímair, killed in Scotland in 904, might be an alternative grandfather, in which case no correction of the form ua Ímair in the Cogad would be needed. At least two generations between the king of Limerick and the founder of the dynasty are required regardless. These assumptions made, Ivar of Limerick can be placed in the pedigree below.

Pedigree of the Dynasty of Ivar

The following list contains only members mentioned in the Irish annals and other reliable and semi-reliable sources, and among those only the ones who can be placed in the pedigree with relative confidence. Thus it is by no means complete.

After various authors. Birthdates are unknown. mac = son of; ingen = daughter of; ua = grandchild of; Ua (h)Ímair = surname (descendant of Ímar).

- Ímar/Ívar/Ivar/Ívarr (died 873)
  - Bárid mac Ímair (died 881)
  - Sichfrith mac Ímair (died 888)
  - Sitric mac Ímair (died 896)
  - ? mac/ingen Ímair, and/or among the above sons
    - Amlaíb ua Ímair (died 896)
    - Ímar ua Ímair (died 904)
    - Ragnall ua Ímair (died 920/1)
      - ? mac Ragnaill (died 942)
      - Ímar (died 950)?
        - probably Ímar of Waterford (died 1000)
          - Gilla Pátraic mac Ímair (died 983)
          - Ragnall mac Ímair (died 995)
          - Donndubán mac Ímair (died 996)
          - Ragnall mac Ímair II (died 1018)
            - ? mac Ragnaill (died 1015)
            - Ragnall mac Ragnaill (died 1035)
          - Sihtric mac Ímair (died 1022)
    - Sihtric Cáech (died 927)
      - Sichfrith mac Sitric (died 937)
      - Ausle mac Sitric (died 937)
      - Aralt mac Sitric (died 940)
        - probably Maccus mac Arailt (died 984/7)
        - probably Gofraid mac Arailt (died 989)
          - Ragnall mac Gofraid (died 1005)
          - Lagmann mac Gofraid (died ?)
            - Amlaíb mac Lagmann (died 1014)
              - ? Donnchadh mac Amlaíb (died 1014)
          - Máel Muire ingen Gofraid (died ?)
      - Gofraid mac Sitriuc (died 951)
      - Amlaíb Cuarán (died 981)
        - Ragnall mac Amlaíb (died 980)
        - Glúniairn (died 989)
          - Gilla Ciaráin mac Glúniairn (died 1014)
          - Sitric? mac Glúniairn (fl. 1036)
        - Aralt mac Amlaíb (died 999)
          - Ímar mac Arailt (died 1054)
        - Dubgall mac Amlaíb (died 1014)
        - Ragnailt ingen Amlaíb (died ?)
        - Máel Muire ingen Amlaíb (died 1021)
        - Gytha ingen Amlaíb (died ?)
        - Sigtrygg Silkbeard (died 1042)
          - Artalach mac Sitric (died 999)
          - Amlaíb mac Sitric I/II (died 1013)
          - Glúniairn mac Sitric (died 1031)
          - Amlaíb mac Sitriuc II/I (died 1034)
            - Ragnailt ingen Amlaíb (died ?)
          - Gofraid mac Sitric (died 1036)
          - Cellach ingen Sitric (died 1042)
    - Gofraid ua Ímair (died 934)
      - Alpdann mac Gofraid (died 927)
      - Amlaíb mac Gofraid (died 941)
        - Cammán mac Amlaíb (fl. 962)
      - Ragnall mac Gofraid (fl. 943)
      - Blácaire mac Gofraid (died 948)
    - ? ua Ímair (or among the above grandsons?)
      - Ímar of Limerick (died 977)
        - Cú Allaidh (Amlaíb) mac Ímair (died 977)
        - Dubcenn mac Ímair (died 977)
          - Osli mac Dubceinn (died 1012)
          - Amond mac Dubceinn (died 1014)
        - Aralt mac Ímair (died 978)

== Tyrant of Muman ==
The passage in the Cogad Gáedel re Gallaib describing Ivar's arrival and kingship in Munster:

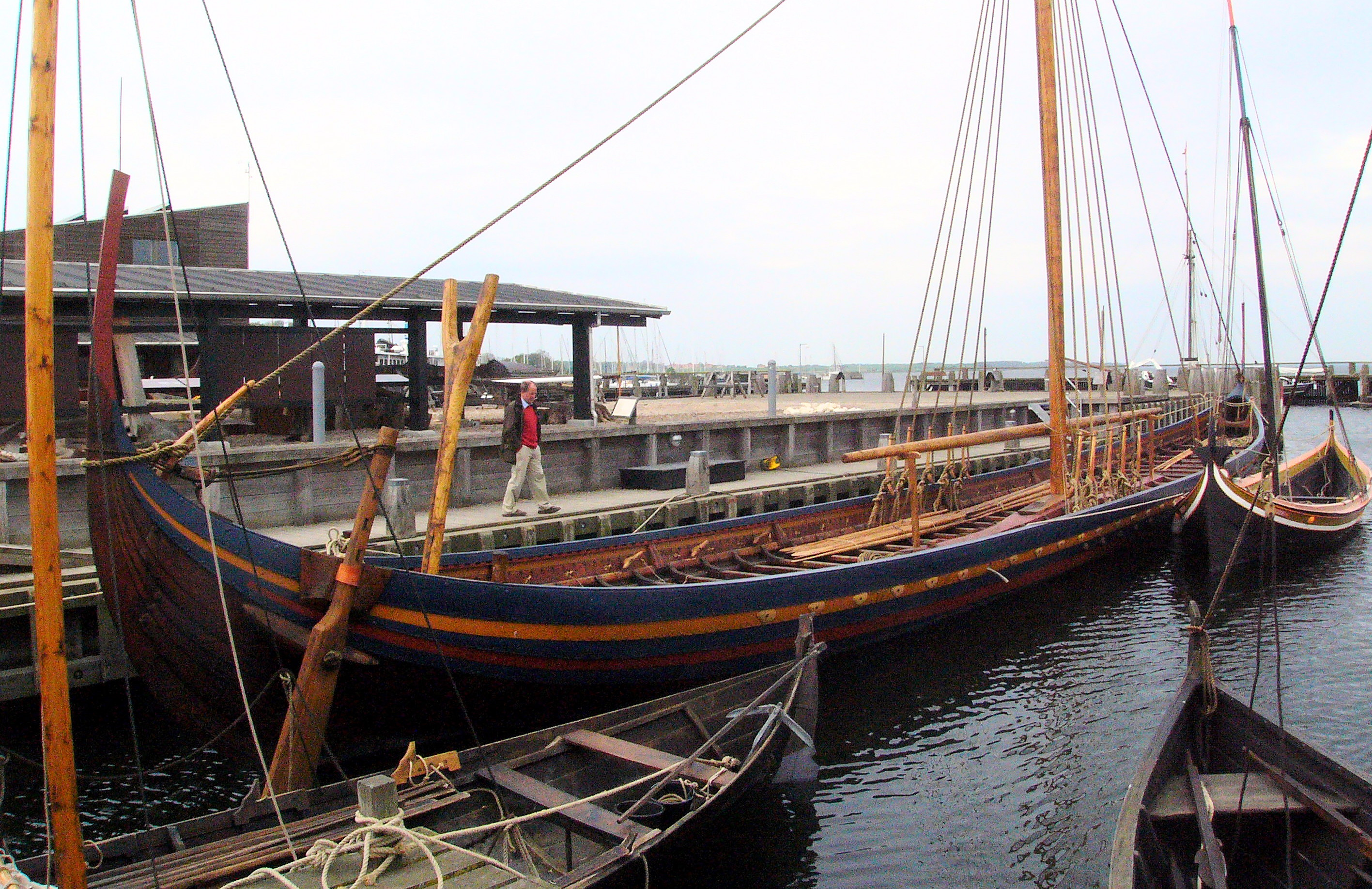
Reconstruction of a Viking longship originally built in Ireland, 11th century.

There came after that an immensely great fleet, more wonderful than all the other fleets, (for its equal or its likeness never before came to Erinn,) with Imar, grandson of Imar, chief king of the foreigners, and with three sons, viz., Dubhcenn, and Cú Allaidh, and Aralt, sons of Imar. These landed and encamped in Inis-Sibtond, in the harbour of Luimnech. Mumhain was plundered and ravaged on all sides by them, both churches and chieftainries, and they levied pledges and hostages from all the men of Mumhain, both Gaill and Gaedhil; and they afterwards brought them under indescribable oppression and servitude to the foreigners and the Danes.

The author goes on to describe the system of government which Ivar imposed on Munster, but doing so in a way which reflects the "structure of assessment and control in the territories of the Uí Briain at the time of composition of the text":

Moreover, he appointed kings and chiefs, township reeves and king's agents, in every territory and in every district after that, and he levied the royal tax. And such was the oppressivenes of the tribute and tax of the foreigners over all Ireland at large, and generally, that there was a king from them over every territory (tír), and a chief (toísech), over every district (túath), and an abbot over every church, and a reeve (máer), over every township, and a soldier in every house (tech).

There does, however, survive a very similar passage, found not in any surviving version of the Cogad but in another tract entirely, preserved by Duald Mac Firbis in the 17th century. Its date is uncertain, and it may or may not come from a lost version of the Cogad. Most of the following is also mentioned in the epic, following the above passages, but there is much expanded. The following account at least gives the appearance of being a summary, but this is probably not what it is:

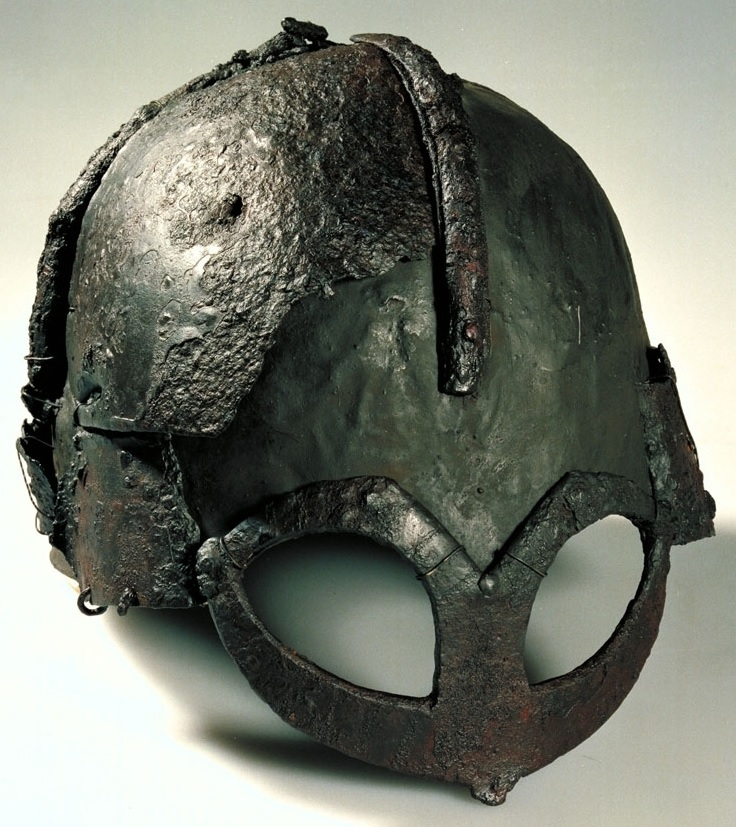
10th century Viking helmet, Norwegian.

A fleet, the like of which had never before been seen, came with Iomhar the Great [Íomhar Mór], grandson of Iomhar, chief king of the Foreigners, and with his three sons, viz. Duibhcenn, Cuallaidh, and Aralt, and they took Inis Sibthonn, in the harbour of Limerick, and they took hostages from the foreigners. The foreigners appointed a king over every territory, a chief over every tribe, an abbot over every church, a bailiff over every village, a soldier in every house, so that no Irishman had in his power, from the brood of a hen to the first milchcow, so that they did not dare to show devotion or care to father or to mother, to a bishop or to an ollav, or to a confessor, or to people who were ill or afflicted, or to an infant one night old; even if an Irishman had but one cow, the soup of her was forced to be given to the soldier, the night when milk could not be got from her, and an ounce of gold, or of silver, or of findruine as the royal rent for every year; and the man who had not the means (of paying it) had himself to go into slavery, or also his nose was cut off.

That Ivar or the Norse in general may have been attempting the actual takeover of some part of Munster possibly finds support in the Annals of Inisfallen:

[AI972.1:] The banishment of [Norse] soldiers from Munster; and the three ordinances, viz., the banishment of the [Norse] soldiers, the banishment of the foreigners from Limerick, and the burning of the fortress, were enacted by the counsel of the nobles of Munster, namely, Mathgamain and Faelán and the son of Bran, and others.

The term used here for the Norse soldiers is súaitrech "mercenary" and so the passage has been taken by Charles Doherty to refer to the practice of billetting the hired contingents of a standing army, as was common in later times. What is peculiar about this passage is the extent of cooperation between the Gaelic kings. Here the sworn rivals Mathgamain and Máel Muad (the son of Bran) are actually found working together, the only known occasion in their careers. They are joined by one Faelán of uncertain identity, whose mention may either refer to a king of the Déisi Muman who actually died in 966, and who the Cogad alleges Ivar actually killed, or to an abbot of Emly later mentioned dying in 980. Notably Emly was attacked by Ivar or his relations in 968 not long after the Norse loss in the Battle of Sulcoit in 967, and possibly in retaliation for the Dál gCais plundering of Limerick.

The above account, however, is dated five years after Sulcoit in the Annals of Inisfallen, and is in fact the first entry following the lacuna beginning in mid 969, so we do not know what events have preceded it in the past two and a half years, assuming it is correctly placed. Ivar is first mentioned by name in the surviving annals in early-mid 969, which record that "Beólán Litil and his son were killed by Ímar of Luimnech." The identity of this person is not completely certain but he is assumed to be identical with the Uí Néill king of Lagore (Loch Gabor) or Southern Brega whose death, without cause given, is recorded in several other annals in the same year. Clare Downham notes that this puts Ivar and the Limerick Norse active all the way out in the neighborhood of Dublin and says that Beolán was an ally of the King of Dublin, namely Olaf Cuaran. The Cogad also records this killing but provides no motive, simply mentioning it immediately after Ivar's return to Limerick, allegedly from Britain, with a second great fleet. After his alleged expulsion sometime following Sulcoit the author of the Cogad states Ivar and a certain "Amlaíb, son of Amlaíb" attempted the conquest of Britain, but without success, with Amlaib being killed by the king of Britain (unnamed). Having returned to Limerick and killed Beolán (or vice versa), Ivar is said to have then "made many spoils and battles." No other record of these survives, if this properly counts as one, and we must wait til 972 for the Annals of Inisfallen to pick up again.

== Economics and the city-state ==
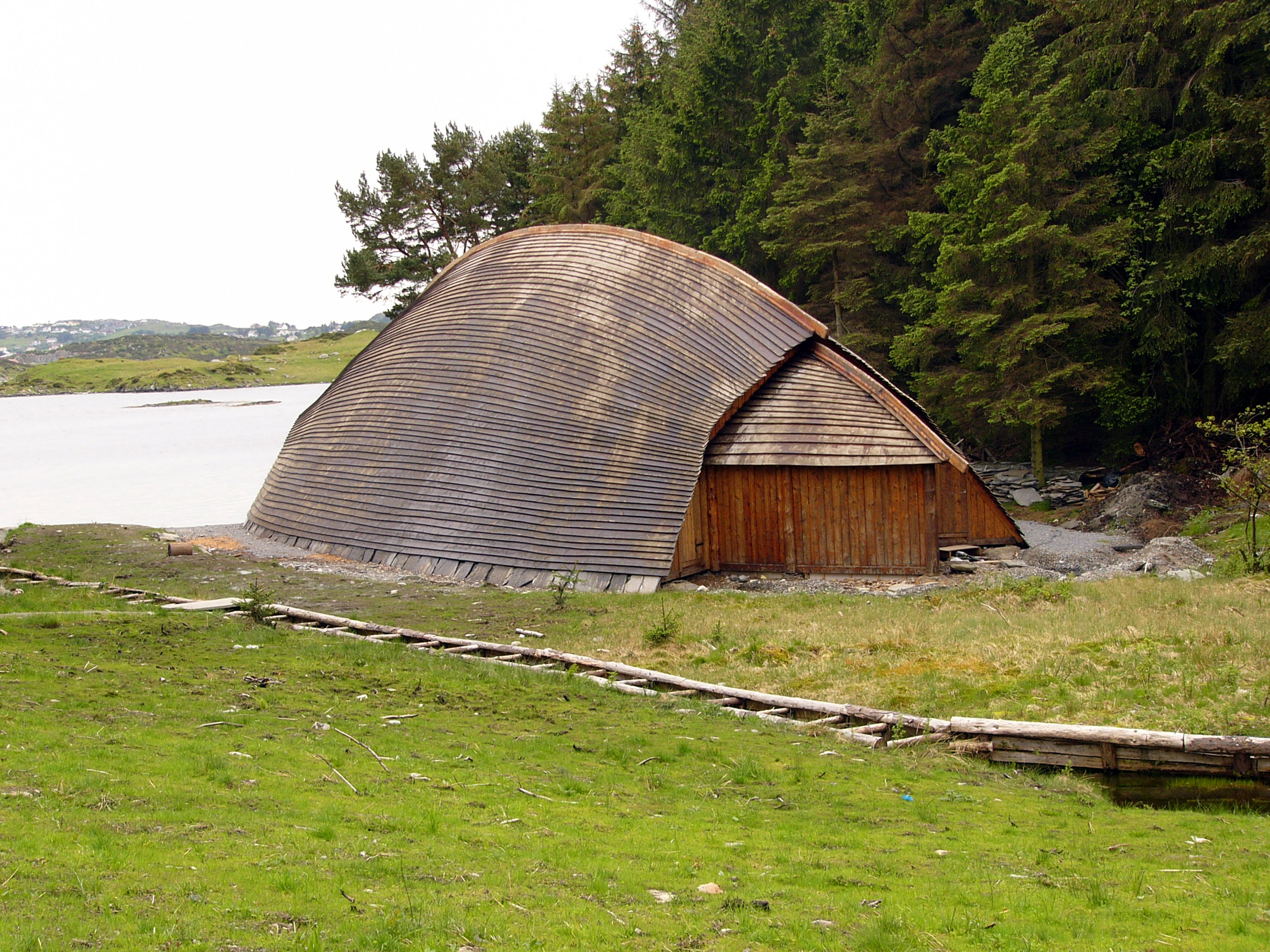
Reconstruction of a Norse boathouse. These were typically constructed on land, not over any water, at this time, the ships hauled into them. Limerick would have featured hundreds for various craft.

The sources have recently been reexamined by the scholar Mary Valante, who has taken an economic approach. Accepting Mac Airt's translation of súaitrech not as soldiers but officials, she interprets this as Ivar and Norse Limerick's dominance of international trade within its region, sphere of influence, or "periphery" in Ireland. She notes that the poll tax described in the Cogad "is very similar to that listed in the Book of Rights and the Book of the Uí Maine from Dublin [sic]", referring to that collected for the Kings of Dublin, and furthermore finds a possible reference to Norse Limerick's royal "officials" in two versions of the Book of Rights itself. However, whether this tribute from Limerick's hinterland (as with Dublin's) was extracted in "a sort of protectionism racket, or as tolls on trade, or as something else entirely is unclear." In any case the Norse economy in Munster, judging from silver finds, appears to have operated somewhat differently from that of the Dublin region. Trade with France, and from there southern Europe and the Mediterranean, can be assumed, but that with elsewhere in the British Isles and the wider Norse world may have been more limited by Limerick's location.

Poul Holm has recently argued that Norse Dublin, Limerick, and Waterford, can all three be classed as genuine city-states as such an entity is defined by Mogens Herman Hansen and the Copenhagen Polis Centre. However only Dublin and Limerick can be considered major "central places" and all the remaining Norse settlements and bases were related to one or the other of these two. Limerick had streets in Ivar's time, as reported in the Cogad when Mathgamain and the Dál gCais storm the great fortress or dún following their victory at Sulcoit.

Inis Cathaigh is believed to have been a part of the kingdom of Limerick. Its Norse name has been suggested by Donnchadh Ó Corráin to be composed of the elements skattar + øy to mean "tribute island". Ivar is reported here twice in the annals, for which read below.

== Maccus ==
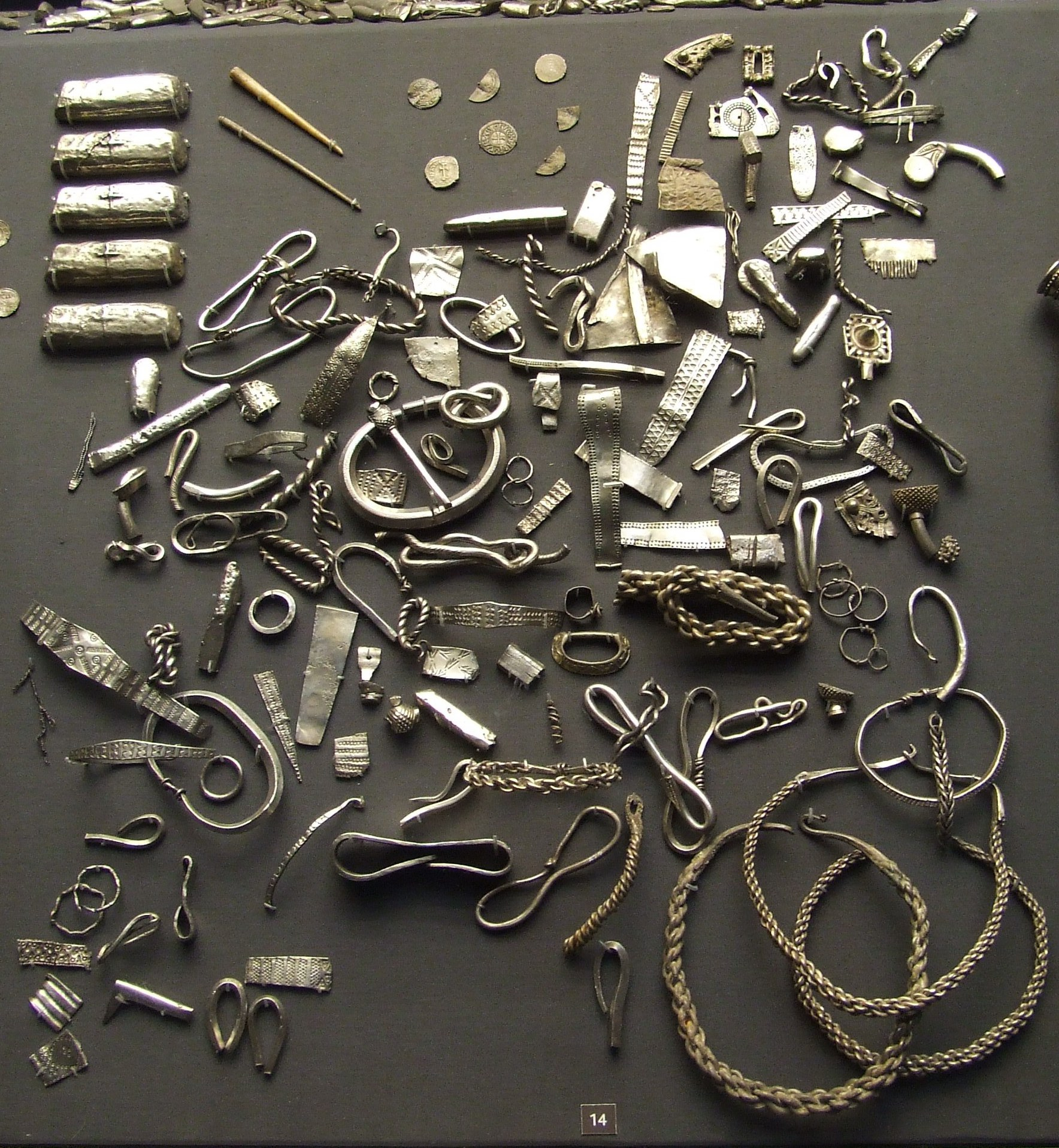
Viking silver, the Cuerdale Hoard.

Depending on whether or not Mathgamain and Máel Muad were successful in achieving anything following their resolution in 972, Ivar may or may not have found himself in a very weakened position. Curiously neither of our major primary sources has anything clear to say about the state of affairs at this time. But in 974 Ivar met with misfortune, the Annals of Inisfallen reporting that "The son of Aralt made a circuit of Ireland with a great company, and plundered Inis Cathaig, and brought Ímar from it into captivity.", and the Annals of the Four Masters "The plundering of Inis-Cathaigh by Maghnus [Maccus], son of Aralt, with the Lag-manns [lawmen] of the islands along with him; and Imhar, lord of the foreigners of Luimneach, was carried off from the island, and the violation of Seanan thereby." His captor is easily identified as Maccus mac Arailt, King of Mann and the Isles, but what are unknown are the circumstances. Ivar may have gone to Scattery because he had been driven out of Limerick proper, or it could have been for some other reason, and whether or not he and Maccus were already associated is unknown. Benjamin Hudson has offered the explanation that this event can be related to Ivar's earlier adventure in Britain as reported in the Cogad, arguing that the "King of Britain" reported slaying his comrade Amlaíb mac Amlaíb should be understood as either Maccus or his brother Gofraid mac Arailt and not some king of the Welsh, otherwise "it probably would have been mentioned in the insular records". (Assuming Hudson is referring only to the Welsh and English records.) Elaborating, he reads this sequence beginning with "a battle over the exploitation of the Welsh" which the sons of Aralt won, and eventually ending with Maccus following Ivar all the way around Ireland to finish it.

However, Maccus and Gofraid are usually assumed to be sons of the Aralt mac Sitric (died 940) mentioned above, the last known king of Limerick before Ivar, thus easily explaining Maccus' interest in the kingdom. Hence dynastic ties and rivalry could have existed. Uniquely Maccus brings the "lawmen" of the Isles with him and instead of being slain Ivar is captured, presumably for some offence in the opinion of Colmán Etchingham, and perhaps related to his earlier expedition to Britain as argued by Hudson for another context. A year later in 975 the Annals of Inisfallen report "Ímar escaped over sea, and Inis Ubdan was captured again.", which has also been variously read as him simply being "released" somewhere in the Isles by Maccus. Alternatively, Alex Woolf suggests Ivar may have been ransomed for a sum, noting that the Norse cities "were rapidly becoming the repositories of silver bullion in the western world." In any event who was doing the capturing of Inis Ubdan again, whether Ivar or Mathgamain, is uncertain. This was one of the islands of the Hiberno-Norse city-state but not the one, Inis Sibtonn, on which the capital was located. Mathgamain is earlier reported driving the Norse from it c. 971 in the not entirely reliable Annals of the Four Masters, but this still assumes the Norse has previously captured it themselves.

Notably none of the above, Maccus' capture of Ivar in 974 or his return from anywhere in 975, is reported in the Cogad. The author had the Annals of Inisfallen entries available to him because they come from the same sources he used.

== Instigator ==
In a debated passage, the author of the Cogad reports Ivar instigating his ally Donnubán mac Cathail (Donovan, the son of Cathal) to meet in his house (commonly said to be hosting a conference or feast) and betray Mathgamain up to Máel Muad mac Brain in 976. Said by the author to be after the confederates, with the addition of Ivar's son Dubcenn, had gone into revolt against Mathgamain, the Dalcassian prince was regardless in a precarious situation, and according to Alice Stopford Green this act of going into an enemy's house was "the formal sign of submission and renouncing supremacy", from where he soon might have proceeded to submit to Máel Muad, although Mathgamain alternatively may have been attempting to detach Donnubán from the alliance. But it has also been argued that this was entirely the product of Ivar's interference with Donnubán and that Máel Muad, a considerably distance away at the time, was in essence the natural and convenient beneficiary, a theory supported by the account in the Cogad. The annals make no mention of Ivar's involvement, simply reporting Mathgamain's seizure in treachery by Donnubán and the killing of the live prisoner by Máel Muad, but at the same time do not exclude it.

== Death, sons and descendants ==
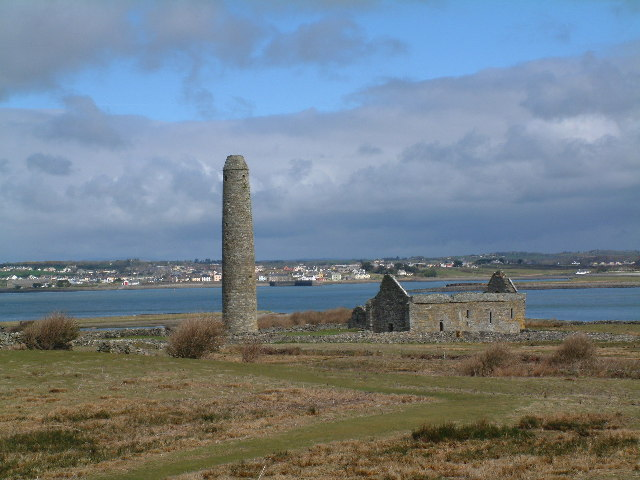
Ruins of the Scattery Island Cathedral, the exact place of Ivar's death.

Possibly in retaliation for instigating the betrayal and killing of Mathgamain the year before, Ivar and two of his sons, Amlaíb Cú Allaidh (Olaf the "wild hound") and Dubcenn ("dark head"), were killed, apparently after being surprised, by Brian in 977 on Scattery Island, marking the end of an independent Norse Limerick, which lasted only a surprising fifty five years from the arrival of Tomrair mac Ailchi in 922. At his death in 977, the generally reliable Annals of Inisfallen actually style Ivar rí Gall or simply King of the Foreigners, a fairly rare style otherwise reserved for the Kings of Dublin, thus perhaps lending at least some weight to the claims of the author of the Cogad that this was a person of special authority in some domain.

This political saga gives him another son, Aralt, elected King of the Foreigners of Munster soon after Ivar's slaying. He is said to have perished, slain by Brian's army, along with Donnubán in the Battle of Cathair Cuan, probably somewhere in Uí Fidgenti. A son of Dubcenn, namely Osli (Auisle < Ásl/Auðgísl), is named later in the saga actually as a "high steward" of Brian, who possibly placed him in control of Mide, when killed by Flaithbertach Ua Néill c. 1012. Another son of Dubcenn may have been Amond, possibly killed fighting on Brian's side in the Battle of Clontarf in 1014.

Ivar is claimed to be survived, through a daughter, by the modern O'Donovan family. This daughter, whose name may or may not survive, is said to have married his ally Donnubán, their eponymous ancestor, although alternatively she may actually have been the daughter of Ivar's son Olaf, a possibility allowed by the pedigrees. But in any case a daughter of this princess and Donnubán is believed to have married Ivar of Waterford and had by him several children.

== Notes ==
Regnal titles
Unknown	King of Limerick to 977	Succeeded by Brian Bóruma
Unknown	King of the Gall of Munster to 977	Succeeded by Aralt mac Ímair
Preceded by Donnchad? Máel Muad?	(King of Munster) (? to 967)	Succeeded by Mathgamain
