= Amlaíb Ua Donnubáin =

King of Uí Chairpre Áebda

Amlaíb Ua Donnubáin (or Olaf/Auliffe O'Donovan) (died 1201) is the last member of the O'Donovan family to be styled king of Uí Chairpre Áebda (Cairbre Eva) in the Irish annals, and in fact the very last known king of this people.

He is the chief victim mentioned by name of a major joint military expedition led by the Anglo-Norman William de Burgh and the three sons of the King of Thomond, Domnall Mór Ua Briain (died 1194), namely Muirchertach, Conchobar Ruad, and Donnchad Cairprech, into Desmond. The Annals of Inisfallen report the events as follows:

AI1201.12: A mighty hosting this year in Desmumu by William and other foreigners, together with the royalty of all Mumu, i.e. including Muirchertach Ua Briain, Conchobar Ruad, and Donnchad Cairprech, and many others, and their plundering parties were sent against Múscraige Mittaine, and they committed great depredations. They proceeded thence to Cenn Eich, spent a week there, and made great raids and burned corn crops in every place they came to. Furthermore, Amlaíb Ua Donnubáin, king of Uí Chairpri, was slain by them, and one of their companies, including Jocelyn's son and many others, was also slain. After that they turned back, having made peace with the opposing forces, and the legate and the other bishops came to make the peace, and hostages and a great levy of cows were given to them (the foreigners). William was in Corcach for the greater part of the winter after his army had preceded him, but he himself departed later on.

Mac Carthaigh's Book reports them slightly differently:

MCB1201.2: A great hosting by William de Burgo and by Muircheartach, Conchobhar Ruadh, and Donnchadh Cairbreach,—three sons of Domhnall Mór Ó Briain—together with the Galls of Cork and Munster. They were a week at Ceann Eich, and they killed Amhlaoibh Ó Donnabháin, king of Uí Chairbre Éabha, and some of the Galls were killed, including Mac Coisdealbha. The legate and the bishops of Munster came and made peace between Síol Briain and Clann Charthaigh and Ó Mathghamhna and William de Burgo. William allowed Síol Briain to go home, and he himself remained in Cork for most of the winter.

In any case, this was effectively the end of the over two century long feud between the O'Donovans and the O'Brien dynasty, resulting from the eponymous Donnubán mac Cathail's capture in 976 of Mathgamain mac Cennétig, elder brother of the famous Brian Bóruma. This had originated in competition between the Uí Chairpre and the rising Dál gCais over both territory in what is now northeastern County Limerick and northwestern County Tipperary, as well as the trade brought to the region by the Norse of Limerick City.

Notably Amlaíb was presumably slain near Cenn Eich, the modern Castletown-Kinneigh, which is in West County Cork near Ballineen and Enniskean, very near to the later home of the family in Carbery, that region most likely deriving its name, in a complicated manner, from the people of his family. In any case, as the first O'Donovan noted there, he is the one most sensibly given the principal credit for establishing the family outside the ancient domains of the Uí Chairpre Áebda. But because of the generally poor and confused state of the O'Donovan pedigrees nothing else is known of his life for certain, nor even his precise relation to the later lords in Carbery. Crom Ua Donnubáin, common ancestor of the later families in Carbery, and the next noted in the region after Amlaíb, would appear to have been a nephew or at least near relation.

== 1200 ==
Olaf is in all likelihood the leader of the Uí Chairpri-led alliance in 1200 against Domnall Mór na Curra Mac Carthaig, King of Desmond, reported in the Annals of Inisfallen:

AI1200.9: Domnall Mac Carthaig brought a hosting into Uí Chairpri, and the Cairprig, Múscraige, Cenél Aeda, Bárraid Ruada, and Bárraid Óca assembled [against him]. Domnall turned upon them, and he, the best king of his time, was slain there with many others.

Domnall Mór na Curra was a powerful king and it is obviously notable that he appears to have been badly defeated here by the Uí Chairpri and their supporters, both Gaels and the Norman de Barrys. However, there was clearly some confusion following the conflict because here the king of Desmond is reported slain, while according to another entry he actually died in 1206.

== Earlier context ==
AI1177.3: Great warfare this year between Tuadmumu and Desmumu, and from Luimnech to Corcach and from Clár Doire Mór to Cnoc Brénainn was laid waste, both church and lay property. And the Uí Meic Caille and the Uí Liatháin came into the west of Ireland, and the Eóganacht Locha Léin came as far as Férdruim in Uí Echach, the Ciarraige Luachra into Tuadmumu, and the Uí Chonaill and Uí Chairpri as far as Eóganacht Locha Léin.

MCB1177.2: A great war broke out between Domhnall Mór Ó Briain and Diarmaid Mór Mac Carthaigh, and they laid waste from Limerick to Cork, and from Clár Doire Mhóir and Waterford to Cnoc Bréanainn, both church and lay property. The Uí Mac Caille fled southwards across the Lee into Uí Eachach, the Eóghanacht Locha Léin fled to Féardhruim in Uí Eachach, the Ciarraighe Luahra into Thomond, the Uí Chairbre, the Uí Chonaill, and the Uí Dhonnabháin into Eóghanacht Locha Léin, and to [the country] around Mangarta.
