= Croom Castle =

Castle in County Limerick, Ireland

Coordinates: 52.515°N 8.718°W

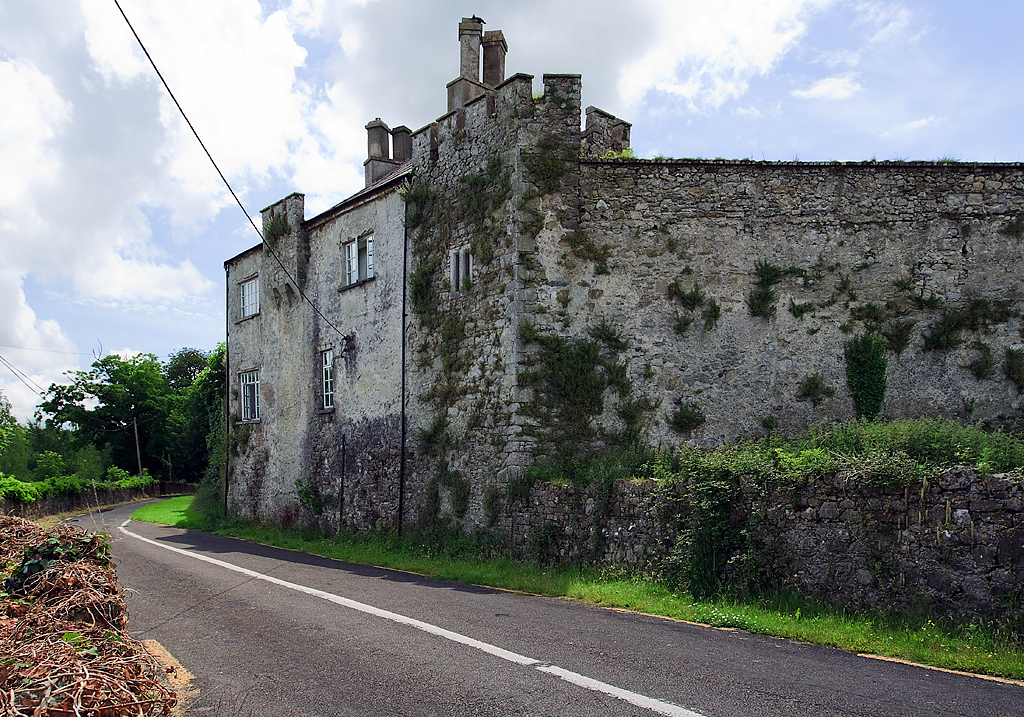
Croom Castle

Croom or Crom Castle, also called the Castle of Crom, is a historic castle in the town of Croom, County Limerick, that is notable for its occupation as one of the principal residences of the Kildare branch of the FitzGerald dynasty. Their ancient war cry and motto "Crom a Boo", or in Irish "Crom Abú" or "Crom forever", comes from the strategic fortress. Before the FitzGeralds it was the site of an earlier fortress of the O'Donovans.

It is located on a strategic bend in the River Maigue, hence the name Cromadh, or "bend in the river".

== O'Donovan fortress ==
The territory in which Croom lies was up until the period of the Norman invasion of Ireland the domain of the ancient Uí Cairpre Áebda (Cairbre Eva), of whom the O'Donovans were the leading family. The Ui Chairpre were a member of the larger regional kingdom of the Uí Fidgenti, the remains of which were at this point sandwiched between the Kingdom of Desmond to the south and Kingdom of Thomond to the north, rivals of each other. The Uí Fidgenti were pressured by Domnall Mór Ua Briain in 1178, but some O'Donovans remained in the area, and according to Samuel Lewis in his 1837 Topographical Description of Ireland, one Dermot O'Donovan erected the first known fortress at Croom sometime during the reign of John of England, or perhaps shortly before.

According to Lewis this was to secure the country which they had recently taken from the MacEnirys (their Ui Fidgheinte kinsmen). But the lineage of the O'Donovans is associated with Croom much earlier: in a manuscript dating from the 1130s, where they are mentioned in the Caithréim Chellacháin Chaisil. In this instance, an O'Donovan ancestor, Uaithne mac Cathail (circa 960 a.d.), is mentioned and associated with Cromadgh, the spelling for Croom in use in the mid-12th century.

Some O'Donovan oral traditions note that the O'Donovans of Carbery are descended from Crom Ua Donnabáin (died 1254), noted in annals as Ancrom, or "The Bent", and also associate him with the building of the Castle of Croom, but this association of Ancrom with the Castle of Croom based on the similarities in name and spelling has been discredited repeatedly.

An early account from around 1690 does not mention a builder of the castle by name:

... the O'Donovans, a family of royal extraction amongst the Irish. They came hither from Coshma, in the County of Limerick, and built there the famous Castle of Crome, which, afterwards, falling to the Earl of Kildare, gave him his motto of "Crome aboo," still used on his skutcheon.

One branch of the O'Donovans and a remnant of the UI-Fidgheinte has been resident in Croom almost continuously for more than eight centuries, with their current farm being held for more than four centuries, but have not occupied the tower castle since the Earls of Kildare established their residence there.

It is believed that the tower castle was built in the early 13th century, following earlier attacks on the town. One such attack was noted in 1151, when a great predatory excursion was made by Ruaidhri, son of Toirdhealbhach Ua Conchobhair, into Thomond, and he carried away many cows, and burned Cromadh.

Today, the castle is little more than a large, undistinguished ruin. Two walls of the tower remain standing, though both have collapsed to about half of their original height, with the other two walls of the tower collapsed into a very large pile of rocks and bricks.

== Croom abú (ah-boo) ==
The motto of the Fitzgerald family is "Croom-a-boo", from Croom Abú, which is Irish for Croom forever!

== Website ==
- CroomCastle.com
