= Peritia =

- Discipline: History
- Language: English
- Edited by: Dáibhí Ó Cróinín

Publication details
- History: Early 1980s-present
- Publisher: Brepols

Standard abbreviations
- ISO 4: Peritia

Indexing
- ISSN: 0332-1592 (print); 2034-6506 (web)

Peritia is an annual peer-reviewed academic journal covering Celtic and Insular medieval studies in the context of the European Middle Ages and European medieval studies in general. It is published by the Medieval Academy of Ireland.

== History ==
Peritia was founded and edited by Donnchadh Ó Corráin of University College Cork since the early 1980s (Note: The Irish Literary Supplement gives 1980 as the year of foundation, The Irish Times 1982. Patrick Wormald in Irish Historical Studies indicates first publication as having been in 1982.) until 2016, Ó Corráin passed on this role to Dáibhí Ó Cróinín (NUI Galway) and Elva Johnston (University College Dublin). Ó Cróinín's work had featured in the first edition. Patrick Wormald also noted two "firsts" in English language scholarship in his review of that edition: Jonas's great life of Columbanus being given its first "sustained treatment" in the language (by Ian N. Wood) and a description of "the beginnings of hagiographical writing in Iceland".

The Irish Times has credited the journal with featuring the work of scholars who might elsewhere have been neglected.

== Publication history ==
The journal is published by Brepols. It has been available since the early 1980s.
