= Glúniairn =

King of Dublin from 980 to 989

Glúniairn (died 989), in Old Norse Járnkné ([ˈjɑːrnˌkneː], Irish for "Iron-knee"), was a Norse-Gael king of Dublin of the Uí Ímair kindred which ruled over much of the Scandinavianised and Norse-Gael parts of Great Britain and Ireland in the tenth century.

Glúniairn was a son of Amlaíb Cuarán (aka Olaf Sigtryggsson; aka Olaf mac Sitric; d. after 980) who abdicated as king of Dublin following his defeat at the Battle of Tara in 980 and the subsequent capture of Dublin by Máel Sechnaill mac Domnaill of Clann Cholmáin, the High King of Ireland. Olaf retired to Iona where he probably became a monk and later died. Glúniairn and Máel Sechnaill were both sons of Dúnlaith, sister of the previous High King, Domnall ua Néill of Cenél nEógain, and Máel Sechnaill appointed his half-brother to rule in Dublin as his client. Máel Sechnaill removed many of the hostages and captives that Amlaíb Cuarán had held in Dublin, including Domnall Clóen, King of Leinster.

It is likely that Glúniairn benefited substantially from the support of his half-brother, and this support extended beyond that which placed him in power in Dublin in 980 over the claims of his many half-brothers. Domnall Clóen, together with Glúniairn's distant kinsman Ivar of Waterford, faced Máel Sechnaill and Glúniairn in battle in 983, and defeated their enemies, Ivar's son Gilla Pátraic being one of the many dead in this rout. Máel Sechnaill's army ravaged across Leinster while Glúniairn's men attacked the church at Glendalough.

In 989 Glúniairn was "killed when drunk by his own slave", his killer's name being given as Colban in Dubhaltach Mac Fhirbhisigh's Chronicon Scotorum. Benjamin Hudson suggests that the reports of the killing in the Irish annals, and particularly Máel Sechnaill's rapid riposte, argue that Glúniairn's death was more probably the result of factional infighting in Dublin. The annals record that Máel Sechnaill attacked Dublin, brushing aside resistance. He demanded, and received, the payment of eraic, a term in early Irish law corresponding approximately with Anglo-Saxon wergild. He retained a third for himself, which is what the law would prescribe for a ruler or nobleman acting to enforce payment. It is unclear if Glúniairn was succeeded by Sigtrygg Silkbeard, his paternal half-brother, or by the rival Ivar of Waterford.

Glúniairn had at least one full sibling, a sister named Ragnhild who married a son of Congalach Cnogba. Glúniairn's son Gilla Ciaráin died in 1014 at the battle of Clontarf. He had a second son, who may have been called Sitriuc, who is recorded as killing Gofraid, son of Sigtrygg Silkbeard, in Wales in 1036. This son was perhaps the father of Gofraid (died circa 1070), a ruler of the Isle of Man who is said to have given refuge to Godred Crovan. This Gofraid had a son named Fingal who also ruled Man and died in 1079. Some interpretations would make Macc Congail, who ruled the kingdom of the Rhinns, Fingal's son.
