= Battle of Belach Lechta =

978 battle in Munster, Ireland

Date	978
Location	Uncertain
Result	Dalcassian victory

Belligerents
Forces of South Munster; Possible Norse allies	Dalcassians and allies

Commanders and leaders
Molloy MacBrien †	Brian Boru

Strength
Unknown	Unknown

The Battle of Belach Lechta or Bealach Leachta was a major battle fought in Munster in 978 between Máel Muad mac Brain, King of Munster, and Brian Bóruma. In the battle, the king was killed and Bóruma took over the role as the de facto King of Munster. Bóruma was the younger brother of Mathgamain mac Cennétig and in line to be the next High King of Ireland.

AI978.2: The battle of Belach Lechta, in which Mael Muad son of Brain, king of Caisel, and many others, fell. Brian, son of Cennétig, was victor.
