= Battle of Sulcoit =

968 battle in Ireland

- Part of the Viking activities in Ireland
Date	968
Location	County Tipperary
Result	Irish victory

Belligerents
Dalcassians	Kingdom of Limerick

Commanders and leaders
Mathgamhain mac Cinnéidigh; Brian Boru	Ivar of Limerick

Strength
Unknown	1,000+

Casualties and losses
Light	Heavy

The Battle of Sulcoit was fought in the year 968 between the Irish of the Dál gCais, led by Brian Boru, and the Norse of Limerick, led by Ivar of Limerick. It was a victory for the Dál gCais and marked the end of Norse expansion in Ireland. It was also the first of three battles that highlight the career of Brian Boru. The battle took place during a military campaign led by Ivar of Limerick into Dál gCais territory. After the battle, the Dál gCais seized and burned the Norse stronghold of Limerick.

Annals of Inisfallen AI967.2: "A defeat of the foreigners of Luimnech by Mathgamain, son of Cennétig, at Sulchuait, and Luimnech was burned by him before noon on the following day."

Annals of Ulster U967.5: "Mathgamain son of Cennáitig, king of Caisel, plundered and burned Luimnech."

The annals only offer the above brief report of the battle and the plundering of Limerick the following day. The only extended account of the battle, including background, mustering, and aftermath, is found in the controversial Cogad Gáedel re Gallaib.

== Background ==
In the year 942, 26 years before the battle, Brian Boru was born in a Dál gCais village in modern-day County Clare. Twelve years after his birth he was attending school at an Irish monastery. While Brian was at the monastery his village was raided by Vikings from the city of Limerick. Brian's father was killed during the raid and power shifted to his son, Latchna. In 953 Latchna died and power shifted to Brian's other brother, Mathgamain mac Cennétig. In 963 Mathgamain formed an alliance with the Viking king Ivar of Limerick. In 964 Brian left with a group of followers to fight the Vikings whom his brother recently made peace with. Brian's rag-tag army used guerrilla tactics against the Vikings whenever he had the chance. Although Brian's group took their toll on the Vikings, the Vikings also took their toll on Brian's men. In Brian's journal he noted that by the year 968 his group had only 15 surviving members after four years of war. Brian's brother, Mathgamain, decided to join Brian in his fight against the Vikings and break his peace with the Vikings.

== War in Ireland ==
Brian Boru and his brother king Mathgamain of Munster, were consolidating their hold on Munster by directly opposing the Vikings of Limerick and their local Gaelic allies. Their success forced Ivar into a hasty coalition with Mathgamain's rivals, including the elected king Molloy of Desmond and Donovan of Hy Carbery. In the summer of 968 Ivar and his allies gathered a large host and set about ravaging the ancestral lands of Boru and Mathgamain. The brothers called in their supporters and marched north from Cashel to meet their enemy on the wooded plain of Sulcoit.

The battle was hard-fought and bloody, with fighting lasting from dawn until dusk, until Ivar's army broke. The Dal gCais pursued the broken army "beheading many along the way" back to Limerick and stormed into the city, ruthlessly sacking it and massacring most of the inhabitants.

== Order of battle ==
=== Irish ===
The Irish nobles are known to have adopted some armor, large shields and the axe by this time. They fought by making an impetuous charge following a shower of javelins and darts. Brian is known for his extensive use of light cavalry and the chronicles mention mounted troops for both armies. Cahal and his followers were renowned "champions" of unknown origin joined Brian just prior to battle.

=== Norse ===
The Norse are known to have fielded close to 1000 mail clad warriors, and a contingent of "champions" were noted as fighting from horseback. The rebel Irish, held in reserve, were swept away with the Norse rout after having played little or no part in the battle. Their leaders were later hunted down and killed by Brian in subsequent campaigns.

=== Battle ===
One day in the year 968, Brian sent out a small raiding party to bait Ivar's forces into the thick forest where the forces of the Dál gCais were waiting. The Norse fell for the ruse, leaving the safety of their fortress. At a small rise called Sulcoit near the modern town of Soloheadbeg Brian's men lied in wait. Although smaller in size the Irish made up for it with the element of surprise. Confident in their numbers Ivar's forces pursued them deeper into the forest. Brian's men led them to Sulcoit and there Brian's men attacked. Due to the swiftness of the attack and the tangled forest the Norse were unable to form a shieldwall

By mid-day the Norse fled and scattered in disorder, relentlessly pursued by Brian's men. The battle was hard-fought and bloody, with fighting lasting from dusk until dawn. The Norse line finally broke and the Irish were described as beheading whoever they captured along the way. Their disordered retreat left the Norse-held city of Limerick vulnerable to attack.

== In popular culture ==
The Battle of Sulcoit is the subject of the song "Born for War (The Rise of Brian Boru)", by the Irish folk metal band Cruachan.
