= Caithréim Chellacháin Chaisil =

12th-century Irish tract

Caithréim Chellacháin Chaisil ("The Victorious Career of Cellachán of Cashel") (Note: Donnchadh Ó Corráin writes that this title "was first given it by Eugene O'Curry in his transcript of the text. It has no title in the earliest copy, that in the Book of Lismore. A variety of titles occurs in the late manuscript tradition in which the tale is normally divided into two parts entitled respectively 'Cathughadh Ceallachain re Lochlannuibh' and 'Toruigheacht na tTaoiseach air Cheallachain' ( Ó Corráin, 'Caithréim' p.1 (fn 1))) is an Irish tract from the first part of the 12th century. It is most likely written some time between 1127 and 1134, (Note: According to Caoimhín Breatnach (p.222) it "appears to have been written between 1127 and 1134", while Letitia Campbell (p.288) states that it was commissioned between 1128 and 1131.) commissioned by Cormac Mac Carthaigh, king of Munster and claimant to the title High King of Ireland. The tale is ostensibly a biography of Cormac's 10th century ancestor Cellachán Caisil, but in reality a propaganda tract.

It is written as an Eóganacht riposte to the Dál Cais/Uí Briain chronicle, Cogad Gáedel re Gallaib, but reflects the current political situation where former rivals Dál Cais and Eóganachta are allied against Tairrdelbach Ua Conchobair, with an emphasis on collaboration between Cellachán Caisil and Cennétig mac Lorcáin against their common foe, the Vikings.

A copy of Caithréim Chellacháin Chaisil is contained in the Book of Lismore, as well as in several other manuscripts. The most recent edition of Caithréim was made by the Norwegian scholar Alexander Bugge in 1905. This edition is based on the text contained in Book of Lismore and R.I.A. 23 H 18 (707), with critical variants from British Library Egerton 106 occasionally cited.

== Notes and references ==
=== References ===
Footnotes

Bibliography

- Breatnach, Caoimhín (2005). "Historical tales". In Seán Duffy (ed.). Medieval Ireland. An Encyclopedia. Abingdon and New York. pp. 221–222.
- Campbell, Letitia (2005). "Mac Carthaig, Cormac ( fl. 1138)". In Seán Duffy (ed.). Medieval Ireland. An Encyclopedia. Abingdon and New York. pp. 288–289.
- Flanagan, Marie Therese (2008) [2005], "High-kings with opposition, 1072-1166", in Ó Cróinín, Dáibhí (ed.), Prehistoric and Early Ireland, A New History of Ireland, vol. I, Oxford: Oxford University Press, pp. 899–933, ISBN 978-0-19-922665-8
- Ó Corráin, Donnchad (1974). "Caithréim Chellacháin Chaisil: History or Propaganda?". Ériu. 25. Royal Irish Academy: 1–69. JSTOR 30008432.
