= Clare Downham =

English medievalist and historian

- Education: University of St Andrews; University of Cambridge
- Occupations: Academic, medievalist, historian
- Organization: Fellow of the Royal Historical Society

Clare Downham is an English academic, a medievalist and historian of Ireland and Britain and the Vikings, specialising in the era 400 to 1350.

== Career ==
She studied for degrees in Medieval History at the University of St Andrews and in Anglo-Saxon, Norse and Celtic at the University of Cambridge, completing a PhD at the latter in 2003 under the supervision of Prof. Fergus Kelly (previously supervised by David Dumville).

In 2001, she took up a John O'Donovan scholarship in Celtic Studies from the Dublin Institute for Advanced Studies, before taking a lectureship in the Celtic department at the University of Aberdeen and then in Irish Studies at the University of Liverpool. Subsequently, at Liverpool, she became Professor of Medieval History with the Institute of Irish Studies.

Downham was a elected a Fellow of the Royal Historical Society in May 2025.

== Select publications ==
- "The Chronology of the Last Scandinavian Kings of York, AD 937–954", Northern History 40 (2003), pp. 25–51
- "Eric Bloodaxe – axed? The Mystery of the Last Viking King of York" Mediaeval Scandinavia 14 (2004), pp. 51–77
- Viking kings of Britain and Ireland : the Dynasty of Ivarr to AD 1014 (Edinburgh : Dunedin Academic, 2007)
- "'Hiberno-Norwegians' and 'Anglo-Danes': Anachronistic Ethnicities in Viking Age England", Mediaeval Scandinavia 19 *2009), pp. 139–69
- No horns on their helmets? essays on the insular Viking-age (Centre for Anglo-Saxon Studies and the Centre for Celtic Studies, University of Aberdeen: Aberdeen, 2013)
- (ed.) Jocelin of Furness : proceedings of the 2011 Conference (Donington: Shaun Tyas, 2013)
- Medieval Ireland (Cambridge : Cambridge University Press, 2018)
