= Máel Muad mac Brain =

Máel Muad mac Brain (died 978), commonly anglicised Molloy and referred to in several texts as Maelmuadh son of Bran, was King of Munster, first possibly from 959 or alternatively 963 to around 970, when he may have been deposed (usurped) by Mathgamain mac Cennétig of the Dál gCais, and then again from 976, following his putting to death of the latter, until his own death in the Battle of Belach Lechta against Mathgamain's brother Brian Bóruma in 978. From around 970 to 976, he is referred to in the sources only as King of Desmond (also known as "lord of Desmumu"), but remained "in opposition" to Mathgamain throughout his career. Máel Muad's chief ally in Munster was Donnubán mac Cathail, to whom he partly owed his second reign, and with whom he is also associated earlier. Along with Donnubán he was also allied, according to the not contemporary saga and political tract Cogad Gáedel re Gallaib, with Ivar of Limerick, who may himself have temporarily been overlord of the province.

Máel Muad belonged to the Uí Echach Muman or Eóganacht Raithlind and is an ancestor of the medieval and modern O'Mahony family. His last ancestor to be King of Munster was Feidlimid mac Tigernaig.

His son Cian mac Máelmuaid became a close ally of Brian Bóruma, reputedly marrying his daughter Sadb, according to late traditions and the antiquarian John O'Mahony.
