= Uí Fidgenti =

Early kingdom of northern Munster in Ireland

- 4th century–fragmented late 13th century
- Capital: Brugh Ríogh (Dún Eochair Maigue)
- Common languages: Old Irish, Middle Irish, Classical Gaelic, Latin
- Religion: Gaelic polytheism, Christianity
- Government: Clan / Corporate
- Elected Chief
  - fl. circa 379 AD: Fiachu Fidgenid
- independent chiefs
- Historical era: fl. Late Antiquity
  - Established: 4th century
  - Disestablished: fragmented late 13th century
- ISO 3166 code: IE

The Uí Fidgenti, Fidgeinti, Fidgheinte, Fidugeinte, Fidgente, or Fidgeinte (/iː ˈfiːjɛnti/ or /ˈfiːjɛntə/; (Note: In the pronunciation, the -d- is silent, and the -g- becomes a glide, producing what might be anglicized Feeyenti or Feeyenta.) "descendants of, or of the tribe of, Fidgenti") were an early kingdom of northern Munster in Ireland, situated mostly in modern County Limerick, but extending into County Clare and County Tipperary, and possibly even County Kerry and County Cork, at maximum extents, which varied over time. They flourished from about 377 AD (assumption of power of Fidgheinte) to 977 (death of Donovan), although they continued to devolve for another three hundred years. They have been given various origins among both the early or proto-Eóganachta and among the Dáirine by different scholars working in a number of traditions, with no agreement ever reached or appearing reachable.

== Clans ==
Genealogies deriving from the Uí Fidgenti include O'Billry, O’Bruadair (Brouder), O'Cennfhaelaidh (Kenneally/Kenealy), Clerkin, Collins (Cuilen), O'Connell, O'Dea, O'Donovan, Flannery, O'Heffernans, Kenealyes, Mac Eneiry, O'Quin, and Tracy. Whether a surname is distinguished with an "O'" is irrelevant, as all the old Irish families derive from their "Ui" prefix designation; the use of the "O" was discouraged during the era of the Penal Laws, and came back into vogue in connection with the rise of Irish nationalism after the 1840s.

Closely related to the Uí Fidgenti were the Uí Liatháin, who claimed descent from the same 4th century AD dynast, Dáire Cerbba (Maine Munchaín), and who in the earliest sources, such as The Expulsion of the Déisi (incidentally), are mentioned together with them.

The Uí Fidgenti descend from Fiachu Fidgenti, the second son of Dáire Cerbba, whom, it is believed, became the senior line of the Milesian race upon the death of Crimhthann in 379 AD Fiacha himself, however, never became King of Munster, for he was killed by his rival, Aengus Tireach, great-grandson of Cormac Cas, in a battle fought at Clidhna, near Glandore Harbor. As noted in the Book of Lecan, Fiacha received the designation because he constructed a wooden horse at the fair of Aenach Cholmain.

Ultimately, six hundred years after the time of Fiacha, the territories of the Uí Fidgenti divided into two principal factions or septs, the Uí Chairpre Áebda and Uí Chonaill Gabra. The latter were more often the stronger power. By 1169, the Uí Chairpre had further divided into the Uí Chairpre and the Uí Dhonnabháin, though comparing the genealogies set forth in Rawlin and the Book of Munster, the lines diverged with Cenn Faelad, four generations before Donovan (died 974), reflecting that specific family's alliance with the Danes of Limerick and Waterford.

Modern descendants of Daire Cerbba include the O'Connells of Derrynane, Daniel Charles, Count O'Connell having explicitly declared this to the heralds of Louis XVI of France. Also was Michael Collins, descending from the Ó Coileáin of Uí Chonaill Gabra, once the most powerful sept of the Uí Fidgenti.

== Size and extents ==
A variety of sources show that Uí Fidgenti was the most prominent of the non-(classical)-Eóganacht overkingdoms of medieval Munster, once the formerly powerful Corcu Loígde and distant Osraige are excluded as non-participating. By circa 950, the territory of the Ui Fidgheinte were divided primarily between the two most powerful septs, the Ui Cairbre and the Ui Coilean. The Ui Cairbre Aobhdha (of which O’Donovan were chief), lay along the Maigue basin in Coshmagh and Kenry (Caenraighe) and covered the deanery of Adare, and at one point extended past Kilmallock to Ardpartrick and Doneraile. The tribes of Ui Chonail Gabhra extended to a western district, along the Deel and Slieve Luachra, now the baronies of Upper and Lower Connello. Other septs within the Ui Fidgheinte were long associated with other Limerick locations; a branch of the Fir Tamnaige gave its name to Mahoonagh, or Tawnagh. Feenagh is the only geographical trace extant today of ancient Ui-Fidhgeinte. Though the changes in the name of Ui-Fidhgeinte down to the modern Feenagh seem strange, they are quite natural when one takes into account the gradual change from the Irish to the English tongue with a totally different method of spelling and pronunciation and the omission of the "Ui" which was unintelligible to those acquainted only with the latter language. During 1750 to 1900, Fidgeinte had become FOUGHANOUGH or FEOHONAGH, and finally FEENAGH—a name now confined to a single parish southeast of Newcastle in County Limerick.

== Saint Patrick ==
Vita tripartita Sancti Patricii

== Saint Senan ==
Senán mac Geircinn

== Uí Fiachrach Aidhne ==
The Annals first note the Uí Fidgenti in 645 (649) as allies of the celebrated king of Connacht, Guaire Aidne mac Colmáin, at the Battle of Carn Conaill. His dynasty, the Uí Fiachrach Aidhne, controlled much of the territory to the immediate north of the Uí Fidgenti. Byrne argues the two kingdoms were in rivalry for control over several smaller tuaths, but other evidence suggests they were allied. In the 8th century Lament of Crede, daughter of Guaire, the Ui Fidghente are noted as opponents of her father at the battle of Aine in 667.

== Sites and finds ==
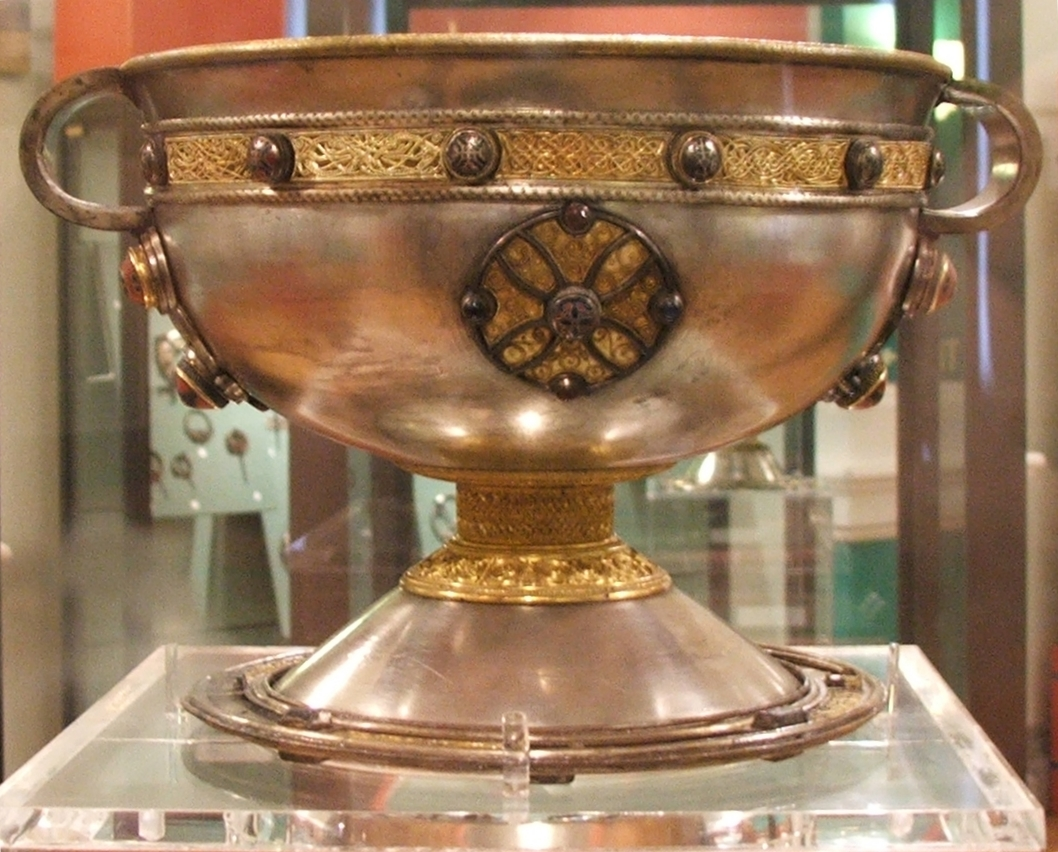
The Ardagh Chalice

Dún Eochair (Maighe) was the great capital of the Uí Fidgenti, described by Geoffrey Keating as having been one of the two great seats of the Dáirine and the legendary Cú Roí mac Dáire. The earthworks remain and the fortress can be found next to the modern town of Bruree, on the River Maigue. The name means "Fortress on the Brink of the Maigue", and the name of the town is anglicised from Brugh Righ, meaning "Fort (Brugh) of Kings (Righ)". The town still has a section Lissoleem, meaning, literally, the ringfort ("lis") of Oilioll Olum (alternative spelling Ailill Aulom), who died 234 AD, entombed at Duntryleague, and who was the great-great-great-grandfather of Fiachu Fidhgeinte, and from whom many of the Eoghanachta tribes descend.

To the south of Brugh Riogh can be found Cnoc Samhna ("Hill of Samhain"), also known as Ard na Ríoghraidhe ("Height of the Kingfolk"). Associated with Mongfind, this may have been the Uí Fidgenti inauguration site.

The Ardagh Chalice was discovered in Uí Fidgenti territory, at Reerasta Rath in 1868.

== Eóganachta relationship ==
The Uí Fidgenti are credited with having a unique relationship with the Eóganachta kings at Cashel. Five generations before Fiacha, Oilioll Olum (died 234 AD) is credited with dividing Munster into two parts and between two of his sons, and enjoined that their descendants should succeed to the governance of the province in alternate succession; this injunction was complied with until the time of Brian Boru, who is credited with slaying Donovan of the Ui Fidgheinte in 977.

The Ui Fidgheinte were not subject to the Eóganachta kings at Cashel, and did not pay tribute. The Book of Rights noted that the stipends of the King of Cashel to the kings of his territory included, to the King of Ui Chonaill: ten steeds, shields, horns; and, to the King of BrughRigh (now Bruree): seven steeds, horns, swords and seven serving youths and seven bondmen. It also noted that the word of the King of Ui Chonail to the Kings of Cashel was sufficient, and no hostages need be exchanged as consideration for an agreement. A passage in The Expulsion of the Déisi names the Uí Fidgenti, including the Uí Liatháin, among the Three Eóganachta of Munster, the others being the Eóganacht Locha Léin and the Eóganacht Raithlind. All three were of sufficient military and political standing to exchange hostages with the Kings at Cashel, instead of them being required as would be demanded from a subjugated opponent.

== Disintegration ==
The disintegration of the Uí Fidgenti commenced in 1178, when Domnall Mor O'Brien caused the Uí Chonaill and Uí Chairpri to flee as far as Eóganacht Locha Léin and others into County Kerry (AI). The O'Collins, the most powerful sept, would follow many of the O'Donovans some decades later, but one or two smaller septs within the Ui Fidghente, notably the Ui Donnabhains of Feenagh and the MacEnirys, of Coshma, remained in their historical territory in County Limerick for several centuries, adjacent to the Earls of Desmond. Important families which did not survive intact from the war waged by the O'Briens, and the subsequent incursion of the FitzGeralds, were Kenneally, Flannery, Tracey, Clerkin, and Ring. These septs scattered all over Munster.

The recurring conflict with the O'Briens had its most infamous event more than two centuries before, when Donnubán mac Cathail, progenitor of the O'Donovans, formed an anti-Dalcassian alliance with two other leaders, his father-in-law Ivar of Limerick, the Danish king of Limerick, and Máel Muad mac Brain, King of Munster. The result of this was the death of the elder brother of Brian Bóruma, Mahon, Mathgamain mac Cennétig, for his frequent attacks on Ui Fidghente. His death resulted in Brian Boru's subsequent revenge by defeating all three members of the alliance. In the 10th century, the territory of the Ui Fidghente bordered those of Mahon (in Cashel) and of Brian Boru (in Thomond), and territorial conflicts were not uncommon.

Ó Coileáin coat of arms.

The Danish connection of the Ui Fidghente was also a considerable factor in the decrease of their power. The Ui Fidghenete had allied with the Ui Imhar five generations before Donovan was slain in 977, and the O'Donovans continued to carry Danish-dominated names well past the death of Amlaíb (Olaf) Ua Donnubáinof in 1201. Having allied with the losing side of the Danish / Irish conflicts in the late 10th century, the O'Donovans of Ui Chairbre saw their influence wane during the next two centuries while they tried to stem the tide against more powerful forces.

The core of the Uí Chonaill Gabra, under the O'Collins, remained a powerful force in Munster for some period of time. The Annals of Inisfallen note that in 1177 there was "An expedition by Domnall Ua Donnchada (Donnell O'Donoghue) and Cuilén Ua Cuiléin (Colin O'Collins) against Machaire, and they took away many cows. Peace was afterwards made by the son of Mac Carthaig (MacCarthy) and by the Uí Briain (O'Briens)". This suggests the Uí Chonaill Gabra commanded one of the largest forces in Munster at this time and that it was not until after sustained attacks from the FitzGeralds that they were forced to retire to Cork in the mid 13th century. The same Cuiléin Ua Cuiléin and many of the nobles of Uí Chonaill Gabra were slain in a battle with Domnall Mac Carthaig in 1189, an unfortunate event which contributed to their weak resistance against the invading Cambro-Normans. Shortly thereafter, in 1201, Domnall Mac Carthaig brought a hosting into Uí Chairpri, where he was slain; one year later, the last king of Uí Chairpre mentioned in the annals Amlaíb Ua Donnubáin, was slain by William de Burgh and the sons of Domnall Mór Ua Briain in the year 1201 (AI). It is clear that the chiefs and territories of what were formerly the Ui-Fidghente (i.e. the Uí Chonaill Gabra and the Uí Chairpri) were under pressure after 1178, indicating they were still in their historical territory after the 1169 invasion of foreigners, and were caught in the crossfire between the MacCarthaigs, the O'Brians and the English foreigners. By the end of the 12th century, the Ui Fidghente territory was under extreme pressure from all sides, as the MacCarthaigs, O'Brians and the English foreigners (Fitzgerald, Fitzmaurice, DeBurgo) looked to the south and west to expand against the remnants of the Ui Fidghente, the Uí Chonaill Gabra and the Ui Chairpre, who were without formidable allies.

== County Clare ==
Because of the later dominance of County Clare by the Dál gCais, the Uí Fidgenti septs there have proven difficult to trace and identify. A powerful branch of the Uí Chonaill Gabra known as the Uí Chormaic preserved their identity, from whom descend the O'Hehirs, but it is believed that other families were later wrongly classified as Dalcassian.

== Corcu Loígde ==
Evidence may or may not exist for long-term exchange between the Uí Fidgenti and Corcu Loígde. This appears to be a relic of the pre-Eóganachta political configuration of Munster, and may support the theory of (some) Uí Fidgenti origins among the Dáirine as cousins of the Corcu Loígde. There are a number of historical septs who may have their origins with one or the other, evident in collections of pedigrees as early as those found in Rawlinson B 502, dating from 550 to 1130, and as late as those collected by John O'Hart in the 19th century.

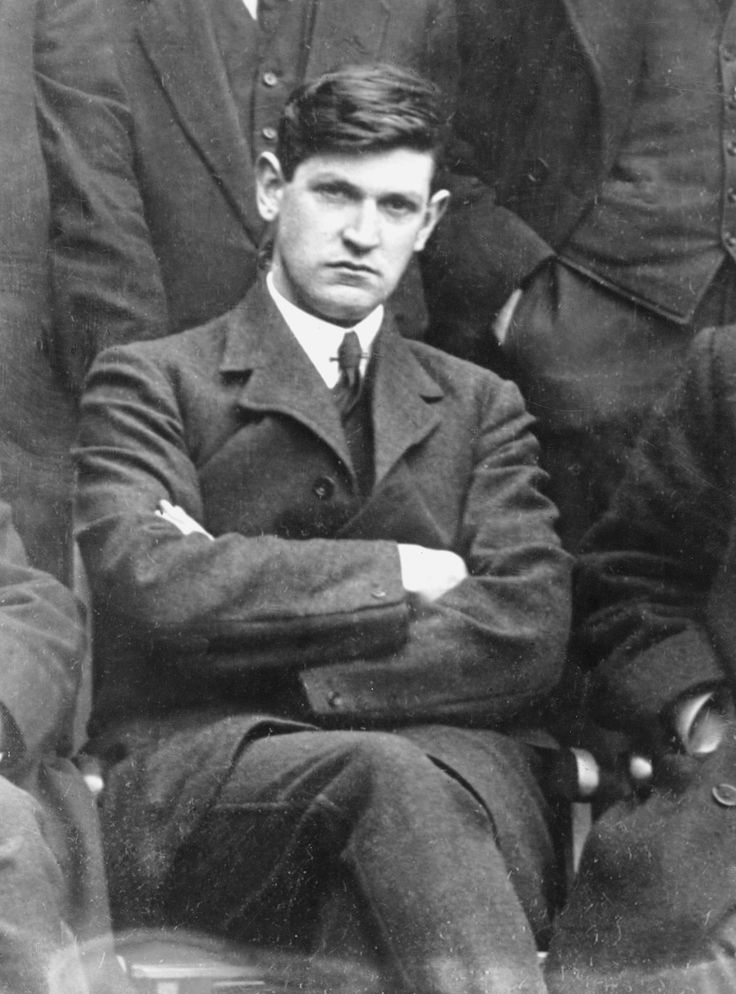
Michael Ó Coileáins

An early O'Leary family are given an Uí Fidgenti (Uí Chonaill Gabra) pedigree, but the Munster sept as a whole are generally regarded to belong to the Corcu Loígde.

It is worth noting that Michael Collins (Irish leader) was descended from the Ó Coileáins of Uí Chonaill Gabra. Both the Ui Chonaill and the Ui Donnobhans were tribes within the Ui-Fidghente.

== Contents ==
- AI635.1 The battle of Cúil Óchtair between the UÍ Fhidgeinte and the Araid.
- AI649.2 Death of Crunnmael son of Aed, king of Uí Fhidgeinte.
- AI683.1 Kl. Death of Donennach, king of Uí Fhidgeinte, and the mortality of the children. [AU —; AU 683, 684].
- AI732.1 Kl. Death of Dub Indrecht son of Erc., king of Uí Fhidgeinte.
- AI751.1 Kl. Death of Dub dá Bairenn son of Aed Rón, king of Uí Fhidgeinte.
- AI762.2 Death of Flann son of Erc, king of Uí Fhidgeinte.
- AI766.2 A defeat [was inflicted] by the Uí Fhidgeinte and by the Araid Cliach on Mael Dúin, son of Aed, in Brega, i.e. Énboth Breg.
- AI774.4 Death of Cenn Faelad, king of Uí Fhidgeinte, and of Rechtabra, king of Corcu Bascinn.
- AI786.2 Death of Scandlán son of Flann son of Erc, king of Uí Fhidgeinte.
- AI834.8 Dúnadach son of Scannlán, king of Uí Fhidgeinte, won a battle against the heathens, in which many fell.
- AI835.9 Death of Dúnadach son of Scannlán, king of Uí Fhidgente.
- AI846.5 Niall son of Cenn Faelad, king of Uí Fhidgente, dies.
- AI860.2 Aed son of Dub dá Bairenn, king of Uí Fhidgeinte, dies.
- AI846.5 Niall son of Cenn Faelad, king of Uí Fhidgente, dies.
- AI906.4 Ciarmac, king of Uí Fhidgente, dies.
- AI962.4 Death of Scandlán grandson of Riacán, king of Uí Fhidgeinte.
- AI972.3 The capture of Mathgamain son of Cennétig, king of Caisel. He was treacherously seized by Donnuban and handed over to the son of Bran in violation of the guarantee and despite the interdiction of the elders of Mumu, and he was put to death by Bran's son.
- AI974.0 Death of Dhonnabhan mac Cathail, tigherna Ua Fidhgeinte.
- AI977.3 A raid by Brian, son of Cennétig, on Uí Fhidgeinte, and he made a slaughter of foreigners therein.
- AI982.4 Uainide son of Dhonnabhán, king of Uí Chairpri, died.
- AI989.4 Congal son of Anrudán, king of Corcu Duibne, dies.
- AI1177.3 Great warfare this year between Tuadmumu (Thomond) and Desmumu (Munster), and from Luimnech to Corcach and from Clár Doire Mór to Cnoc Brénainn was laid waste, both church and lay property. And the Uí Meic Caille and the Uí Liatháin came into the west of Ireland, and the Eóganacht Locha Léin came as far as Férdruim in Uí Echach, the Ciarraige Luachra into Tuadmumu, and the Uí Chonaill and Uí Chairpri as far as Eóganacht Locha Léin.
- MCB1177.2 A great war broke out between Domhnall Mór Ó Briain and Diarmaid Mór Mac Carthaigh, and they laid waste from Limerick to Cork, and from Clár Doire Mhóir and Waterford to Cnoc Bréanainn, both church and lay property. The Uí Mac Caille fled southwards across the Lee into Uí Eachach, the Eóghanacht Locha Léin fled to Féardhruim in Uí Eachach, the Ciarraighe Luahra into Thomond, the Uí Chairbre, the Uí Chonaill, and the Uí Dhonnabháin into Eóghanacht Locha Léin, and to the country around Mangarta.

== Pedigree ==
Based primarily on Rawlinson B 502:

  Dáire Cerbba / Maine Munchaín
               |
               |_______________________________________________________________________________
               |                   |                   |                   |                   |
               |                   |                   |                   |                   |
          Fidach Uí Liatháin Uí Fidgenti Uí Dedaid Uí Duach Argetrois
          |
          |__________________________
          |                          |
          |                          |
Crimthann mac Fidaig Mongfind = Eochaid Mugmedón = Cairenn
                                          |                  |
                                          |                  |
                                      Connachta Uí Néill

== See also ==
- Pre-Norman invasion Irish Celtic kinship groups, from whom many of the modern Irish surnames came from

== Bibliography ==
- Begley, John (1906). The Diocese of Limerick, Ancient and Medieval. Dublin: Browne & Nolan.
- Byrne, Francis John (2001). Irish Kings and High-Kings (2 ed.). Four Courts Press.
- Charles-Edwards, T.M., Early Christian Ireland. Cambridge. 2000.
- Coogan, Tim Pat, Michael Collins: The Man Who Made Ireland. Palgrave Macmillan. 2002.
- Cormac mac Cuilennáin, and John O'Donovan (tr.) with Whitley Stokes (ed.), Sanas Cormaic, or Cormac's Glossary. Irish Archaeological and Celtic Society. Calcutta: O. T. Cutter. 1868.
- Cusack, Sister Mary Frances, Life of Daniel O'Connell, the Liberator : His Times – Political, Social, and Religious. New York: D. & J. Sadlier & Co. 1872.
- FitzPatrick, Elizabeth, Royal Inauguration in Gaelic Ireland c. 1100–1600: A Cultural Landscape Study. Boydell Press. 2004.
- Gógan, Liam S. (1932). The Ardagh Chalice. Dublin: Browne and Nolan.
- Joyce, Patrick Weston, A Social History of Ancient Ireland, Vol. I and A Social History of Ancient Ireland, Vol. II. Longmans, Green, and Co. 1903.
- Geoffrey Keating, with David Comyn and Patrick S. Dinneen (trans.), The History of Ireland by Geoffrey Keating. 4 Vols. London: David Nutt for the Irish Texts Society. 1902–14.
- Kelleher, John V., "The Rise of the Dál Cais", in Étienne Rynne (ed.), North Munster Studies: Essays in Commemoration of Monsignor Michael Moloney. Limerick: Thomond Archaeological Society. 1967. pp. 230–41.
- MacNeill, Eoin, "Early Irish Population Groups: their nomenclature, classification and chronology", in Proceedings of the Royal Irish Academy (C) 29. 1911. pp. 59–114
- Mac Spealáin, Gearóid, Uí Cairbre Aobhdha. Baile Átha Cliath: Oifig an tSoláthair. 1960.
- Mac Spealáin, Gearóid, Ui Conaill Gabhra i gContae Luimnigh: A Stair (A History of West County Limerick). Limerick: Comhar-chumann Ide Naofa. 2004.
- Meyer, Kuno (1901). "The Expulsion of the Dessi". Y Cymmrodor (14): 101–35. Archived from the original on 15 August 2005.
- Meyer, Kuno (ed.), "The Laud Genealogies and Tribal Histories", in Zeitschrift für Celtische Philologie 8. Halle/Saale, Max Niemeyer. 1912. Pages 291–338.
- Meyer, Kuno (ed. & tr.), "The Song of Créde daughter of Guaire", in Ériu 2 (1905): 15–17. (translation available here)
- Murphy, Gerard (ed.), "The Lament of Créide, Daughter of Gúaire of Aidne, for Dínertach, Son of Gúaire of the Ui Fhidgente", in Gerard Murphy (ed.), Early Irish Lyrics: Eighth to Twelfth Century. Oxford: Clarendon Press. 1956. pp. 86–88. Also known as It é saigte gona súain (comp. Donnchadh Ó Corráin 1996)
- Ó Coileáin, Seán, "Some Problems of Story and History", in Ériu 32 (1981): 115–36.
- O'Connell, Mary Ann Bianconi, The Last Colonel of the Irish Brigade: Count O'Connell. London: Kegan Paul, Trench, Trübner and Co. 1892.
- Ó Corráin, Donnchadh (ed.), Genealogies from Rawlinson B 502. University College, Cork: Corpus of Electronic Texts. 1997.
- Ó Corráin, Donnchadh, "Prehistoric and Early Christian Ireland", in Foster, Roy (ed.), The Oxford Illustrated History of Ireland. Oxford University Press. 2001. pgs. 1–52.
- Ó Cróinín, Dáibhí (ed.), A New History of Ireland: Prehistoric and Early Ireland, Vol. 1. Oxford University Press. 2005.
- O'Donovan, John (ed. & tr.), Annala Rioghachta Eireann. Annals of the Kingdom of Ireland by the Four Masters, from the Earliest Period to the Year 1616. 7 vols. Royal Irish Academy. Dublin. 1848–51. 2nd edition, 1856.
- O'Hart, John (1892). Irish Pedigrees (5 ed.). Dublin.
- O'Keeffe, Eugene (ed. & tr.), Eoganacht Genealogies from the Book of Munster. Cork. 1703. (available here)
- O'Rahilly, Thomas F., Early Irish History and Mythology. Dublin Institute for Advanced Studies. 1946.
- Rynne, Etienne (ed.), North Munster Studies: Essays in Commemoration of Monsignor Michael Moloney. Limerick. 1967.
- Sproule, David, "Origins of the Éoganachta", in Ériu 35 (1984): pp. 31–37.
- Sproule, David, "Politics and pure narrative in the stories about Corc of Cashel", in Ériu 36 (1985): pp. 11–28.
- Stokes, Whitley (ed. & tr.), The Tripartite Life of Patrick. London: Eyre and Spottiswoode for Her Majesty's Stationery Office. 1887.
- Todd, James Henthorn, ed. (1867). Cogadh Gaedhel re Gallaibh: The War of the Gaedhil with the Gaill. Longmans.
- Westropp, Thomas Johnson, "A Survey of the Ancient Churches in the County of Limerick", in Proceedings of the Royal Irish Academy Volume XXV, Section C (Archaeology, Linguistic, and Literature). Dublin. 1904–1905. Pages 327–480, Plates X-XVIII.
