= Mathgamain mac Cennétig =

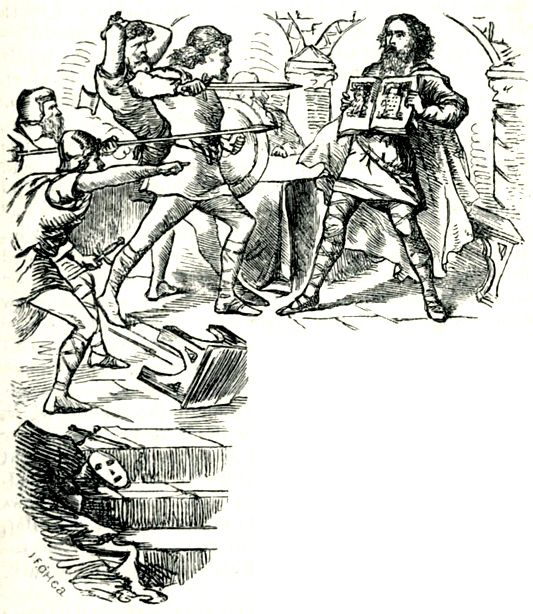
Mathgamain is treachorously slain by Donovan.

Mathgamain mac Cennétig (also known as Mahon) was King of Munster from around 970 to his death in 976. He was the elder brother of Brian Bóruma.

Mathgamain was the son of Cennétig mac Lorcáin of the Dál gCais. His father died in 951 and is called king of Tuadmumu in the report of his death, and was probably succeeded by Mathgamain's brother Lachtna, who was assassinated in 953 by rival septs of the Dál gCais (The Uí Fhloinn and Uí Chearnaigh). After this Mathgamain succeeded him.

In 967, Mathgamain is called "king of Cashel", by the Annals of Ulster. However he is not believed to have become king of Munster until 970 or shortly after, deposing Máel Muad mac Brain. In 967, Mathgamain defeated Ivar of Limerick in the celebrated Battle of Sulcoit, following raids by Mathgamain into Ui Fidgente territory in 964. The most common account of Mathgamain's death was that he was captured in 976 by Donnubán mac Cathail, Tigerna (Chief of the Name) of the Irish clan Uí Fidgenti, with whom the Dál gCais were vying for territory, and who were in alliance with Hiberno-Norse King Ivar of Limerick. Donnubán handed him over to his most powerful ally Máel Muad mac Brain (Mulloy, son of Brain) previous king of Munster, who had Mathgamain killed.

== Sources ==
- Byrne, Francis John, Irish Kings and High-Kings. Batsford, London, 1973; ISBN 0-7134-5882-8
- Máire Ní Mhaonaigh, "Cogad Gáedel Re Gallaib" and the Annals: A Comparison, Ériu Vol. 47 (1996), pp. 101–126.
- Thornton, David E., "The genealogy of Gruffud ap Cynan" in Maund, Kerry L. (ed.), Gruffudd Ap Cynan: A Collaborative Biography. Boydell & Brewer, Woodbridge, 1996; ISBN 0-85115-389-5
