= Donnchadh Ó Corráin =

Irish historian

- Born: 28 February 1942
- Died: 25 October 2017 (aged 75)
- Education: University College Cork

Donnchadh Ó Corráin (28 February 1942 – 25 October 2017) was an Irish historian and professor emeritus of medieval history at University College Cork. He earned his BA in history and Irish from UCC, graduating in 1964.

He was a prominent scholar in early Irish and mediaeval history and with significant publications on the Viking Wars, Ireland in the pre-Hiberno-Norman period and the origins of Irish language names. In addition to his position at UCC, he held academic positions at University College Dublin, Dublin Institute for Advanced Studies, Cambridge University, University of Pennsylvania, University of Oslo and Oxford University, where he was a visiting senior research fellow of Balliol College.

He founded and directed several key projects at UCC, including ArCH, CELT and MultiText. In 1982, he was elected a member of the Royal Irish Academy. Shortly before his death, his magnum opus, the monumental Clavis Litterarum Hibernensium (3 Vols) (A Key to the Writings of the Irish), was published.

In 2015, a Festschrift was published in his honour: Reflecting the breath and depth of his contributions to historical scholarship the volume "contains contributions from leading scholars working at the forefront of Irish medieval studies. It includes essays on archaeology, ecclesiology, hagiography, medieval history, genealogy, language, literature and toponymy. Subjects explored include Latin and learning in early medieval Ireland, Viking armies and the importance of the Hiberno-Norse naval fleets, Ireland and its connections with the Scandinavian world, recent studies of wooden and Romanesque churches in pre-Norman Ireland, hitherto unpublished Anglo Norman charters, the origin and function of medieval rural deaneries, secular and ecclesiastical histories of later medieval Kilkenny, and the ‘named son’ in 16th-century Ireland".

Ó Corráin also made important contributions to Digital Humanities scholarship, having set up the Corpus of Electronic Texts (CELT) in University College Cork in 1992, one of the earliest such corpora of scholarly, electronic texts of Irish literary and historical culture (in Irish, Latin, Anglo-Norman French, and English) of its kind. He also supervised the PhD thesis of scholars who went on to make important contributions to the Digital Humanities and Digital History, such as Professor Julianne Nyhan.

== Selected works ==
- Ó Corráin, Donnchadh. "Ireland before the Normans". Vol. 2. Gill and Mac Millan, 1972.
- Mac Curtain, Margaret, and Donnchadh Ó Corráin. "Women in Irish society: The historical dimension". No. 11. Westport, Conn.: Greenwood Press, 1979.
- Ó Corráin, Donnchadh; Breatnach, Liam; Breen, Aidan (1984). "The laws of the Irish". Peritia. 3: 382–438. doi:10.1484/J.Peri.3.77. ISSN 2034-6506. OCLC 9271498.
- Ó Corráin, Donnchadh. Ireland c. 800: aspects of society. A new history of Ireland - Volume 1 (2005): 549–608.
- Ó Corráin, Donnchadh (1998). "The Vikings in Scotland and Ireland in the ninth century". Peritia. 12: 296–339. doi:10.1484/J.Peri.3.334. ISSN 2034-6506. OCLC 9271498. S2CID 160083344.
- Corráin, Donnchadh Ó (2017). "Orosius, Ireland, and Christianity". Peritia. 28: 113–134. doi:10.1484/J.PERIT.5.114565. ISSN 2034-6506. OCLC 9271498.
- Ó Corráin, Donnchadh. "The Irish Church, its Reform and the English Invasion". (2017)
- Ó Corráin, Donnchadh. Clavis Litterarum Hibernensium (3 Vols), Brepols. (2017)
