= Cotter (surname) =

Cotter is a surname that originates in England and Ireland. It can also be an Anglicization, chiefly in North America, of a similar-sounding German surname.

== Origin of the name ==
The surname Cotter has several different origins.

The English surname is a status name. This name is made up of the Old English elements 'cot' "cottage", "hut" and the suffix er. In the feudal system a cotter held a cottage by service, rather than by rent. Reaney gives the surname deriving from the Old French cotier "cottager" (see: villein). Early bearers of the English surname are Robert le Robert le Cotier in 1198; and William le Coter(e) in 1270 and 1297.

The Irish name is a reduced anglicised form of the Gaelic Mac Oitir. The personal name Oitir is the Gaelic form of the Old Norse Óttarr. The Old Norse name is made up of the elements ótti "fear", "dread" and herr "army". An early Irish record of the name occurs in 1142, when Mac Mic Ottir .i. Ottir ("the son of Mac Ottir, i.e. Ottir") from the Hebrides, is recorded to have assumed the Kingship of Dublin. For the origins of the noble Irish family claiming descent from this king see: Cotter family. Although unprovable, it is possible that both he and they are descendants of the famous Ohthere of Hålogaland, a great Norwegian adventurer who appears to have gone to Ireland. He is possibly the Ottir Iarla or Earl Ottir mentioned in the Cogad Gáedel re Gallaib, or at least related to him.

The surname can in some cases, mostly in the US and Canada, be an Americanization of the German surname Kotter.

=== Similar surnames ===
Similar, or related surnames include: Coates, Cottier, Kotter. Cotter can be rendered into the Irish language as Mac Coitir and Mac Oitir.

== Distribution ==
According to MacLysaght, who wrote in the mid 20th century, the Irish surname of Cotter was peculiar to County Cork. There are at least eight place names in County Cork which incorporate the surname (for example: Ballymacotters near Cloyne).

== List of persons with the surname ==
- Andrew Cotter (born 1973), Scottish sports broadcaster
- Sir Barry Cotter (born 1963), English High Court judge
- Bill Cotter (born 1943), former Irish Fine Gael politician
- Brian Cotter, Baron Cotter (1936–2023), United Kingdom politician
- Brigid Cotter (1921–1978), Irish and English barrister and chemist.
- Cornelius P. Cotter (1924–1999), American professor of political science
- Dan Cotter (1867–1935), American baseball pitcher
- Ed Cotter (1904–1959), American baseball player
- Edmond Cotter (1852–1934), British soldier and footballer
- Edmund Cotter (1927–2017), New Zealand mountaineer
- Edward Cotter (politician) (1902–1972), Irish Fianna Fáil politician
- Eliza Taylor-Cotter (born 1989), Australian actress
- Garrett Cotter (1802–1886), Australian convict
- Hannah Cotter (born 2003), New Zealand field hockey player
- Imogen Cotter (born 1993), Irish cyclist
- James Cotter (judge) (1772–1849), farmer, judge and political figure in Upper Canada
- James Cotter the Younger (1689–1720), son of James Fitz Edmond Cotter
- James Fitz Edmond Cotter (c. 1630–1705), commander of James II's forces during Williamite war in Ireland
- Jeremy Cotter (born 1967/1968) New Zealand rugby union coach
- John P. Cotter (1911–1993), Connecticut, US, judge
- Joseph Bernard Cotter (1844–1909), American bishop
- Joseph Henry Cotter (1872–1937), politician in Manitoba, Canada 1927–1932
- Joseph Seamon Cotter Sr. (1861–1949), American poet, writer, playwright
- Mick Cotter (born 1935), retired Australian politician
- Patricia O'Brien Cotter (born 1950), judge in Montana, US
- Paul Cotter (born 1999), American ice hockey player
- Richard D Cotter (1842–1927), Irish-American geologist
- Tibby Cotter (1884–1917), Australian cricketer
- Tom Cotter (comedian) (born 1963), American comedian
- Tom Cotter (baseball) (1866–1906), American baseball catcher
- Vern Cotter (born 1962), New Zealand rugby union player and coach
- Wayne Cotter, American stand-up comedian
- William Richard Cotter, VC (1883–1916), English soldier
- William R. Cotter (politician) (1926–1981), Connecticut, US
- William Timothy Cotter (1866–1940), Catholic Bishop of Portsmouth (1910–1940)
- Anthony Charles Cotter, S.J., S.T.D. (1879–1954), Jesuit neo-scholastic theologian

== List of persons with the given name ==
- Cotter Smith (born 1949), American actor

== See also ==
- Cotter Baronets
