= James Cotter =

James Cotter may refer to:

- Sir James Fitz Edmond Cotter (c. 1630–1705), soldier and colonial governor
- Sir James Cotter, 1st Baronet (1714–1770), Irish politician and baronet
- Sir James Cotter, 2nd Baronet (1748–1829), Anglo-Irish politician
- Sir James Cotter, 3rd Baronet (1782–1834), Anglo-Irish politician and baronet
- Sir James Cotter, 4th Baronet (1828–1902), Anglo-Irish officer
- Sir James Laurence Cotter, 5th Baronet (1887–1924), Anglo-Irish officer
- James Cotter the Younger (1689–1720)
- James Cotter (judge) (1772–1849), farmer, judge and political figure in Upper Canada
- James Cotter (politician) (1869–1948), New Zealand politician
- James Cotter (rugby union) (1907–1991), Scottish rugby union player

== See also ==
- Jim Cotter (disambiguation)
