= Sir Delaval James Alfred Cotter, 6th Baronet =

British Army officer and baronet (1911–2001)

Lieutenant Colonel Sir Delaval Cotter 6th Baronet of Rockforest DSO
- Preceded by: Sir James Cotter, 5th Baronet of Rockforest
- Succeeded by: Sir Patrick Cotter, 7th Baronet of Rockforest

Personal details
- Born: 29 April 1911
- Died: 2 April 2001 (aged 89)
- Spouse(s): Evelyn Roma Noyce Rome; Eveline Mary Mardon
- Children: Sarah Gay Lisette; Charnisay Ann
- Parent(s): Sir James Cotter, 5th Baronet; Ethel Lucy Wheeler
- Relatives: Sir James Cotter, 4th Baronet of Rockforest (grandfather)

Military service
- Allegiance: United Kingdom
- Branch/service: British Army
- Years of service: 1931–1959
- Rank: Lieutenant Colonel
- Unit: 13th/18th Royal Hussars
- Commands: 3rd squadron, 13th/18th Royal Hussars
- Battles/wars: Second World War; Battle for Mont Pincon; North-West Europe 1944–1945; Malayan Emergency
- Awards: Distinguished Service Order

Lt. Col. Sir Delaval James Alfred Cotter, 6th Baronet of Rockforest, DSO (29 April 1911 – 2 April 2001) was an Anglo-Irish officer and Baronet. Sir Delaval was the son of Sir James Cotter, 5th Baronet and Ethal Lucy Wheeler, daughter of Alfred Wheeler, formerly 9th Lancers. He was educated at Malvern College and at the Royal Military College, Sandhurst. He married firstly in 1943, Evelyn Roma Noyce Macewen née Rome, widow of Squadron Leader Kenneth Alexander Keswick MacEwen and daughter of Adrian Scott Rome of Dalswinton Lodge, S. Rhodesia, who were divorced in 1949. And secondly Eveline Mary, daughter of Evelyn John Marden, of Halsway Manor, Somerset in 1952.

Sir Delaval was a Lieutenant-Colonel in the 13th/18th Regiment of the Royal Hussars and fought in the Second World War, where he was awarded the Distinguished Service Order.

He was commissioned into 13th/18th Royal Hussars in 1931 and joined the Regiment at Sialkot in India. In 1938 he returned to England with his Regiment, where it was to be mechanised. In 1939 the Regiment crossed to Belgium as part of the British Expeditionary Force, and in 1940 was evacuated through Dunkirk. In 1942 it became clear that the Second Front would involve the 13th/18th Hussars and thus in 1944, with everything ready, the Regiment landed on D-Day with Sir Delaval in command of 'C' Squadron. They are remembered for having the first tanks ashore at D-Day, and it was two months later after D-Day that Sir Delaval won his DSO for his 'tenacity and leadership' (Times Obituary, 2001) commanding his squadron in the battle of Mont Pinçon. It was said that it was vital that the village of La Variniere, on the Regiment's line of communication, should be held otherwise withdrawal from Mont Pinçon would have been inevitable. Thus under intense enemy shelling, Sir Delaval and 'C' Squadron held the village for 24 hours and thus enabled the village to be reinforced and the position secured.

After the war, he was posted to the Middle East, and then sent on to Greece, Headquarters of the 4th Division. In 1947 he moved to HQ Northern Command in York and in 1948 he returned to the Regiment, this time in Libya.

In 1949 he accompanied the 13th/18th Royal Hussars to Malaya, where the communist insurrection had begun in 1948. There the armoured cars of the calvalry regiments played an important role in escorting convoys of troops and supplies and in making sure roads stayed open throughout the Emergency.

From 1950 to 1953 Sir Delaval commanded the Warwickshire Yeomanry, and in 1953 he took over command of the Regiment, 13th/18th Royal Hussars, in Germany. He left the Regiment in 1956 and retired from the army in 1959.

During the 1960s and 1970s Sir Delaval and Lady Cotter moved back to Ireland, and bought and restored Castle Widenham in Castletownroche.

Cotter was succeeded by his nephew, Sir Patrick Laurence Delaval Cotter, who became the 7th Baronet in 2001.

== See also ==
- Cotter baronets
- Cotter family
- James Fitz Edmond Cotter
- James Cotter the Younger
- Óttar of Dublin

== Notes ==
Baronetage of Ireland
Preceded by James Laurence Cotter	Baronet (of Rockforest); 1924–2001	Succeeded by Patrick Laurence Delaval Cotter
