= Óttar =

Óttar or Ottar may refer to:

- Ottar, a Swedish king who appears in Beowulf as Ohthere
- Óttar (mythology), in Norse mythology, the protégé of Freya, and the subject of the Lay of Hyndla
  - The dwarf Ótr is sometimes known as Óttarr
- Ottar from Hålogaland, the Viking adventurer
- Ottir Iarla (Earl Ottir), historical Norse-Gael of Waterford and probable settler of Cork
- Jarl Ottar, earl of Götaland figuring in the Jomsvikinga Saga and in the Heimskringla
- Óttarr svarti (Óttarr the Black), an 11th-century Icelandic court poet
- Óttar of Dublin, 12th-century Norse-Gael king of Dublin

Given name

- Ottar Brox (1932–), Norwegian politician for the Socialist Left Party
- Ottar Dahl (1924–2011), Norwegian historian and historiographer
- Ottar Fjærvoll (1914–1995), Norwegian politician from the Centre Party
- Ottar Gjermundshaug (1925–1963), Norwegian skier who competed in the early 1950s
- Ottar Grønvik (1916–2008), Norwegian philologist and runology scholar
- Tor Ottar Karlsen (1950–), Norwegian politician for the Labour Party
- Ottar Landfald (1919–2009), Norwegian politician for the Centre Party

== See also ==
- Cotter family
- Cotter (surname)
