= Sir James Laurence Cotter, 5th Baronet =

British politician (1887–1924)

Sir James Cotter 5th Baronet of Rockforest
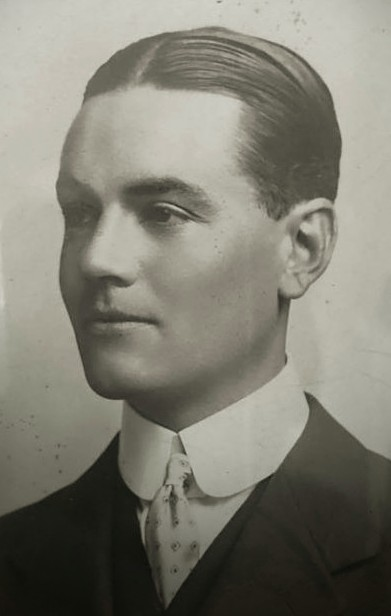
- Predecessor: Sir James Cotter, 4th Baronet of Rockforest
- Successor: Sir Delaval Cotter, 6th Baronet of Rockforest
- Born: 1887
- Died: 1924 (aged 36–37)
- Residence: Rockforest, Mallow
- Spouses: Ethel Lucy Wheeler; Griselda Winifred Wenyon
- Issue: Violet Rosa Sonia Cotter; Sir Delaval James Alfred Cotter, 6th Baronet; Laurence Stopford Llewellyn Cotter
- Parents: James Lombard Cotter; Claire Mary Segrave
- Occupation: Army; High Sheriff of County Cork

Sir James Laurence Cotter, 5th Baronet of Rockforest (1887–1924) was an Anglo-Irish officer, High Sheriff of County Cork, and Baronet.

Cotter was the first son of James Lombard Cotter (the second son of the fourth Baronet) and grandson of the third Baronet.

He succeeded his grandfather, the fourth Baronet, in 1902. He was a captain in the Royal Artillery and a Brig-Major in the South of Ireland Imperial Yeomanry and in 1914 was appointed to the office of High Sheriff of County Cork.

He married, firstly, Ethel Lucy Wheeler the daughter of Alfred Wheeler, and had issue Violet Rosa Sonia Cotter, Sir Delaval Cotter, and Laurence Stopford Llewellyn Cotter who was killed in action in Sicily in 1943 at age 30. And secondly, Griselda Winifred Wenyon, daughter of Edwin James Wenyon.

Upon his death, Cotter was succeeded by his first son Sir Delaval Cotter, the 6th Baronet.

Sir J. L. Cotter's book All about the Rose in Simple Language was published in 1924 (with a facsimile reprint in 2010 from Kessinger Publishing). His book A Simple Guide to Rock Gardening was published in 1926.

== See also ==
- Cotter baronets
- Cotter family
- James Fitz Edmond Cotter
- James Cotter the Younger
- Óttar of Dublin

Baronetage of Ireland
Preceded by James Laurence Cotter	Baronet (of Rockforest); 1902–1924	Succeeded by Delaval James Alfred Cotter
