= Sir James Cotter, 3rd Baronet =

British politician (1782–1834)

Sir James Cotter 3rd Baronet of Rockforest
- Predecessor: Sir James Cotter, 2nd Baronet of Rockforest
- Successor: Sir James Cotter, 4th Baronet of Rockforest
- Born: 1787
- Died: 1834 (aged 46–47)
- Residence: Rockforest, Mallow
- Spouse: Helena Tryndall Lombard
- Issue: Sir James Laurence Cotter, 4th Baronet
- Parents: Sir James Cotter, 2nd Baronet; Isabella Hingston
- Occupation: Member of Parliament for Mallow

Sir James Laurence Cotter, 3rd Baronet of Rockforest (1782 – 31 December 1834) was an Anglo-Irish politician and baronet.

Cotter was the son of Sir James Cotter, 2nd Baronet and Isabella Hingston, and the grandson of Sir James Cotter. In the 1812 United Kingdom general election, he was elected as the Member of Parliament for Mallow, and he held the seat until 1818. On 9 February 1829, he succeeded to his father's baronetcy.

He married Helena Tryndall Lombard, daughter of Major James Lombard and Ann Becher, on 1 January 1820. Cotter was succeeded by his son, also called James, the 4th Baronet.

== See also ==
- Cotter baronets
- Cotter family
- James Fitz Edmond Cotter
- James Cotter the Younger
- Óttar of Dublin

Parliament of the United Kingdom
Preceded by Denham Jephson	Member of Parliament for Mallow; 1812–1818	Succeeded by William Wrixon Becher
Baronetage of Ireland
Preceded by James Laurence Cotter	Baronet (of Rockforest); 1829–1834	Succeeded by James Laurence Cotter
