= Mac Coitir =

- Mac Coitir in a Gaelic type.
- Gender: Masculine
- Language: Irish

Other gender
- Feminine: Nic Coitir, Bean Mhic Coitir, Mhic Coitir

Origin
- Language: Irish
- Meaning: "son of Oitir"

Other names
- Variant form: Mac Oitir

Mac Coitir and Mac Oitir are masculine surnames in the Irish language. The names translate into English as "son of Oitir". These surnames originated as a patronyms, however they no longer refers to the actual name of the bearer's father. There are specific forms of these surnames that are borne by married and unmarried females. There are numerous Anglicised forms of these surnames.

== Etymology ==
Mac Coitir is a variant form of Mac Oitir, where the c-sound has carried over from the Mac- prefix. According to Patrick Woulfe, who wrote in the early 20th century, the form Mac Coitir is the more popular form of the two surnames. The surnames translate into English as "son of Oitir". These surnames originated as patronyms, however they no longer refer to the actual name of the bearer's father. The name Oitir is a Gaelic derivative of the Old Norse personal name Óttar(r).

== Feminine forms ==
The form of these Irish surnames for unmarried females is Nic Coitir and Nic Oitir; these names mean "daughter of the son of Oitir". The form of these Irish surnames for married females is Bean Mhic Coitir and Bean Mhic Oitir, or simply Mhic Coitir and Mhic Oitir; these names mean "wife of the son of Oitir".

== Anglicised forms ==
These Irish surnames can be Anglicised variously as MacCotter, MacCottier, MacCottar, Cotter, Cottier, Cottiers, and Otterson.

== Families ==
The names are borne by families in Ulster. The names are also borne by an old and notable family that was historically seated at Carrigtwohil, near the city of Cork; this family claims to be of Norse origin.
