= Sir James Cotter, 4th Baronet =

British politician (4 April 1828 – 1902)

Sir James Cotter 4th Baronet of Rockforest
- Predecessor: Sir James Cotter, 3rd Baronet of Rockforest
- Successor: Sir James Cotter, 5th Baronet of Rockforest
- Born: 1828
- Died: 1902 (aged 73–74)
- Residence: Rockforest, Mallow
- Spouses: Julia Emily Loinsworth; Jane Veargitt Maughan
- Issue: Sir Ludlow Cotter (Knt.); James Lombard Cotter; Guy Cotter (d. an infant)
- Parents: Sir James Cotter, 3rd Baronet; Helena Tryndall Lombard
- Occupation: Army; Justice of the Peace; High Sheriff of County Cork

Sir James Laurence Cotter, 4th Baronet of Rockforest (1828–1902) was an Anglo-Irish officer, Justice of the Peace, High Sheriff, and Baronet.

Cotter was the son of Sir James Cotter, 3rd Baronet and Helena Tryndall Lombard, and the grandson of Sir James Cotter the 2nd Baronet. He succeeded his father, the third Baronet, in 1834. He was educated at Trinity College, Dublin. He served in H.M. 27th Regt and was formerly one of Her Majesty's Body Guard. He was a captain in the South Cork Light Infantry and the Queen's Own Light infantry. He was Justice of the Peace in county Cork, a Deputy Lieutenant of the Tower Hamlets and in 1882 he was appointed to the office of High Sheriff of County Cork.

He married, firstly, Julia Emily Loinsworth, and had issue Sir Ludlow Cotter, Knt., who died unmarried and without issue, and James Lombard Cotter, a Lieutenant in the Gloucestershire Regiment. The Baronetcy thus passed to James Lombard Cotter's first son, James Laurence Cotter, who succeeded his grandfather, the 4th Baronet, as the fifth Baronet in 1902.

== See also ==
- Cotter baronets
- Cotter family
- James Fitz Edmond Cotter
- James Cotter the Younger
- Óttar of Dublin

Baronetage of Ireland
Preceded by James Laurence Cotter	Baronet (of Rockforest); 1834–1902	Succeeded by James Laurence Cotter
