= Cottier =

Cottier may refer to:

== Surname ==
- Cottier (surname), a name originating from the British Isles

== Various ==
- Cottier (farmer), a type of serf, also cottar, cottager
