= Jim Cotter =

Jim Cotter may refer to:

- Jim Cotter (priest) (born 1942), British priest and poet
- Jim Cotter (composer) (born 1948), Australian composer
- Jim Cotter (curler) (born 1974), Canadian curler

== See also ==
- James Cotter (disambiguation)
