= Cotter baronets =

Title in the Baronetage of Ireland

Cotter Baronetcy, of Rockforest – 1763 –
- Arms: Quarterly, 1st & 4th, argent a chevron gules between three serpents proper, Cotter; 2nd and 3rd, azure, a fesse between a fleur-de-lis in chief and a mullet in base or, Rogerson. Crest: A dexter arm embowed, armed and grasping a dart, all proper.
- Creation date: 11 August 1763
- Created by: King George III
- Baronetage: Baronetage of Ireland
- First holder: Sir James Cotter, 1st Baronet of Rockforest
- Present holder: Sir Julius Cotter, 8th Baronet of Rockforest
- Heir presumptive: Stuart Cotter
- Remainder to: the 1st Baronet's heirs male
- Status: Extant
- Former seats: Anngrove, Rockforest
- Motto: DUM SPIRO SPERO (While I breath I hope.)

The Cotter Baronetcy, of Rockforest in the County of Cork, is a title in the Baronetage of Ireland. The baronetcy was created on 11 August 1763 for James Cotter, a member of the Irish House of Commons for Askeaton.

The Cotters are noted as one of the very few Irish families of verifiable Norse descent to survive the Norman invasion of Ireland, and are said to descend from Óttar of Dublin, who was a Hiberno-Norse King of Dublin reigning from 1142 to 1148.

King James II of England promised the grandfather of the first Baronet, Sir James Fitz Edmond Cotter, the title of Marquess, but following the surrender of the Jacobite forces in 1691 James II went into exile and the promise could not be kept.

== Family history ==
Sir James Cotter, the first Baronet, (MP for Askeaton), was educated at Midleton College. He was the son of the executed James Cotter the Younger and grandson of Sir James Fitz Edmond Cotter. The authorities intervened in the education of the first Baronet and his siblings who were raised as Protestants. This act eliminated one of the families who formed the hereditary leadership of the Catholic community in Ireland. Ultimately, the descendants of Sir James Fitz Edmond Cotter retained their wealth and political prominence. He was created the first Baronet of Rockforest on 11 August 1763.

The second Baronet, who succeeded the first Baronet in 1770, was a member of parliament in the Irish House of Commons, representing Taghmon from 1771 to 1776 and Mallow from 1783 to 1790.

The third Baronet, who succeeded his father the second Baronet in 1829, represented Mallow in the British House of Commons.

The fourth Baronet succeeded his father, the third Baronet, in 1834. He served in H.M. 27th Regt and was formerly one of Her Majesty's Body Guard. In 1882 he was appointed to the office of High Sheriff of County Cork.

The fifth Baronet was a Lieutenant in the South of Ireland Imperial Yeomanry and in 1914 was appointed to the office of High Sheriff of County Cork. He succeeded his grandfather the fourth Baronet in 1902.

The sixth Baronet, Sir Delaval Cotter, the third Baronet's great-grandson (the title having descended from father to son except for the fourth Baronet who was succeeded by his grandson), was educated at Malvern College and at the Royal Military College, Sandhurst. He was a Lieutenant-Colonel in the 13th/18th Regiment of the Royal Hussars and fought in the Second World War, where he was awarded the Distinguished Service Order. During the 1960s and 1970s he and his wife, Lady Cotter, moved back to Ireland and bought and restored Castle Widenham in Castletownroche.

The seventh Baronet, Sir Patrick Laurence Delaval Cotter, was the only son of Laurence Stopford Llewellyn Cotter (killed in action in Sicily in 1943) and Grace Mary Downing. He was the nephew of the sixth Baronet and grandson of the fifth Baronet. He succeeded his uncle as the 7th Baronet of Rockforest in 2001. Sir Patrick was educated at Blundell's School and the Royal Agricultural College, Cirencester. He was an antique dealer, restorer and collector.

The eighth Baronet (the current holder of the title) is the seventh Baronet's only son, Sir Julius Cotter . He succeeded his father as the eighth Baronet of Rockforest on 11 January 2023. He was educated at Allhallows College, Rousden and the University of East London (BA). Cotter worked at the Michael Parkin Fine Art gallery in Belgravia, and later as an Assistant Director in Spain. He has been an actor since 2014, credited as Julius Cotter.

== Seats: Anngrove, Rockforest ==
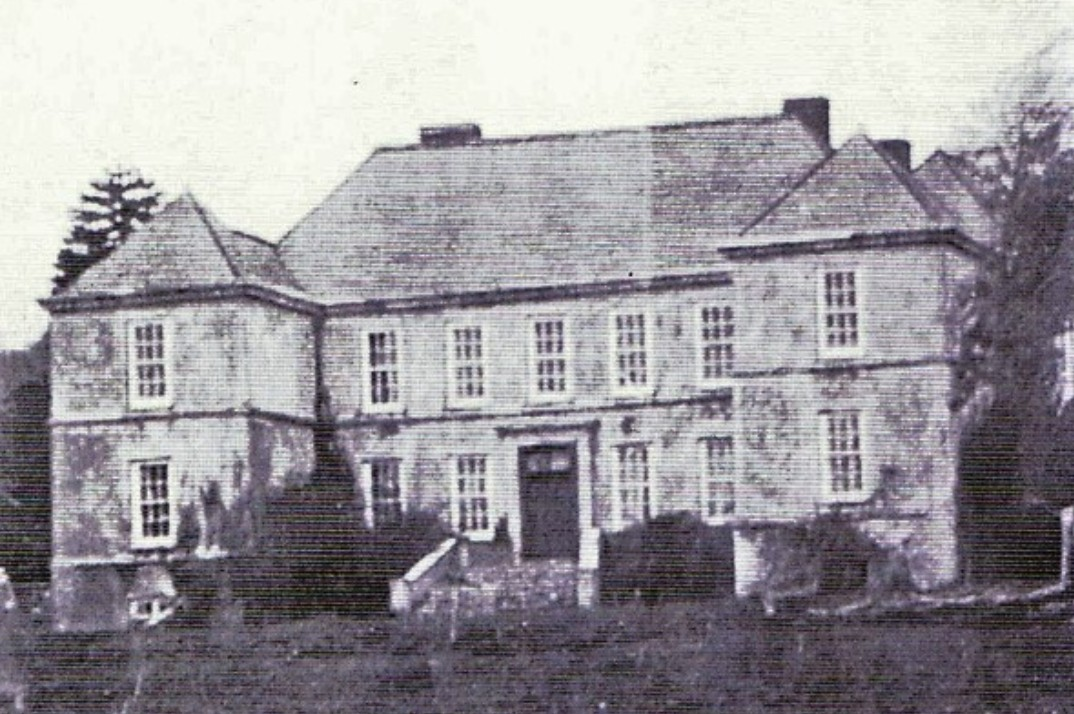
Ballinsperig, Anngrove

Sir James Fitz Edmond Cotter (Irish: Séamus Buidhe Mac Coitir or Séamus Mac Éamonn Mhic Coitir; c.1630–1705), knight and grandfather of the first Baronet of Rockforest, was one of the most prominent Catholic landlords in Ireland especially in County Cork. Born around 1630, the second son of Edmond Fitz Garrett Cotter of Anngrove and Elizabeth Connell of Barryscourt, he was knighted in 1685, and died in 1705.

Sir James Cotter was an intimate of James II and probably served at sea with the King when he was still the Duke of York, in the war against the Dutch of 1665. King James II is reported to have familiarly referred to Cotter as "Shaymus Bwee," Séamus Buidhe in Irish. Sir James is believed to have been knighted by King James in 1685 following the Battle of Sedgemoor.

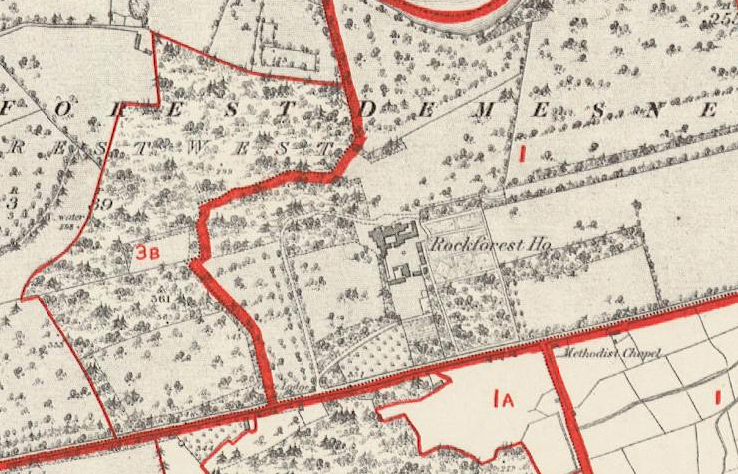
Rockforest House, Mallow

Sir James Fitz Edmond Cotter was Commander-in-Chief of King James II's forces in counties Cork, Limerick and Kerry and was a great ally to the House of Stuart. He lived at Ballinsperig, later to be known as Anngrove. When King James II landed in Kinsale in March 1689, he went to Annegrove and stayed there with Sir James. King James II promised Cotter an elevation to the peerage as a Marquess but following the surrender of the Jacobite forces under the Treaty of Limerick in 1691, the King returned to France where he spent the rest of his life in exile and his promise to Cotter of a Marquessate could therefore not be kept. Although a Jacobite, Sir James was politically astute having the support of his Protestant neighbours which allowed him to retain his property and lands. He was heralded by many poets in Ireland as one of the few Catholic landowners.

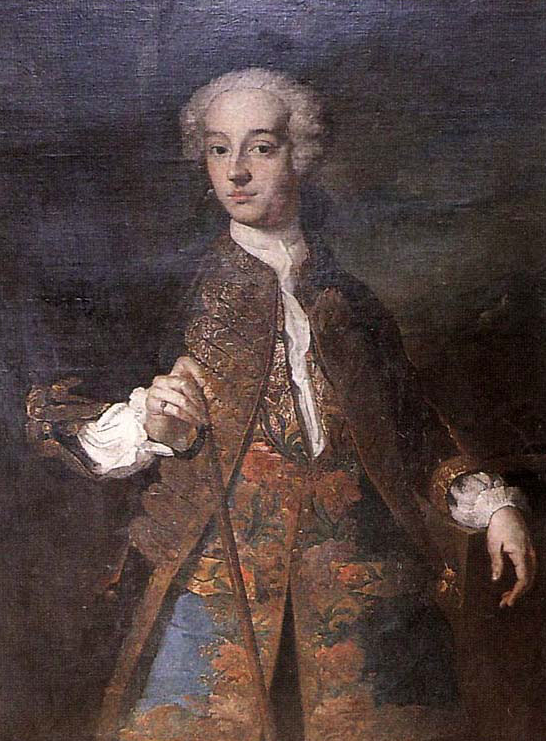
Sir James Cotter, 1st Baronet of Rockforest by James Latham

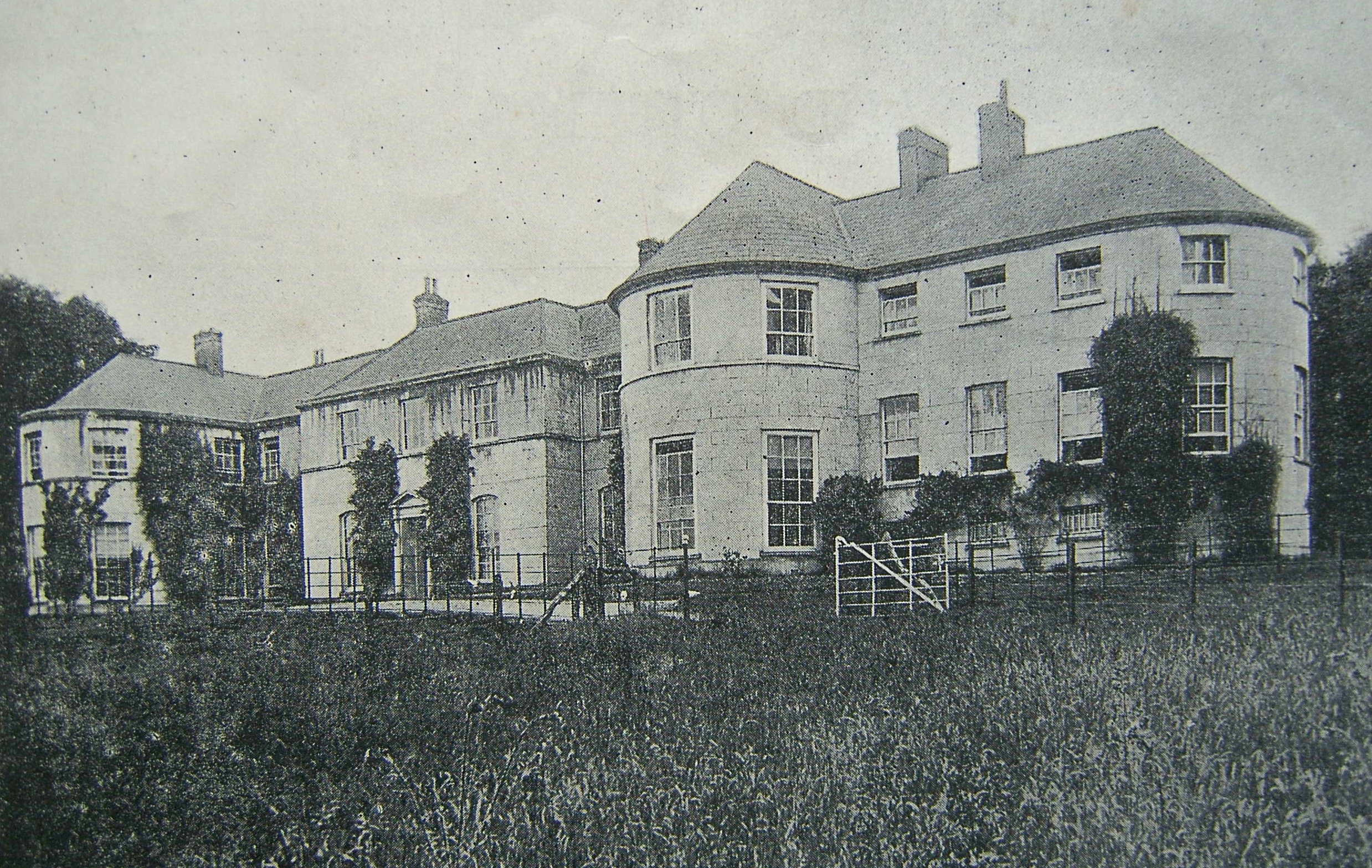
Rockforest House

Rockforest then became the family's seat from the mid 18th century. Wilson, writing in 1786, describes it as "a most beautiful improvement, highly wooded, situated on the Blackwater, the seat of Sir James Laurence Cotter". The main section of the house and wings, built by Sir James, dates to the early Georgian period (his grandfather was granted the lands in 1652). This design incorporated an earlier house built during the reign of Elizabeth I which had been built by the original owners the Roches, Barons of Fermoy.

In 1837, in A Topographical Dictionary of Ireland, Samuel Lewis describes Rockforest thus: 'Rockforest the handsome mansion of Sir J. L. Cotter, Bart., is beautifully situated on a rising ground between the Black-water and the Lavally mountain, in an extensive and richly wooded demesne, bounded on the north by the river, which sweeps bodly under the rock or Carrig, the woods and castellated tower on the summit of the rock forming a most picturesque and interesting scene.'It was here that the very rare form of quartz Cotterite was discovered by Grace Elizabeth Cotter (1830–79), first-born daughter of Reverend George Edward Cotter (third son of the second Baronet of Rockforest).

Rockforest was eventually sold in 1916, by the fifth Baronet. The then auction sales brochure called it to the attention of "Noblemen, Hunting Men, Capitalists and Others" and describes the house thus, "this stately Mansion, which is in perfect structural and decorative repair, occupies a commanding situation on an eminence richly timbered, and affords delightful and varied views in the midst of charming scenery on the River Blackwater". It continues, " ... justly enjoying the reputation as the most Desirable and Beautiful Residential Property on the fertile banks of the Irish Rhine".

During the 1960s the sixth Baronet and his wife moved back to Ireland with the idea of returning the family to County Cork. They bought Castle Widenham in Castletownroche and while they lived there, restored the castle and Norman keep.

== Cotter baronets, of Rockforest (1763) ==
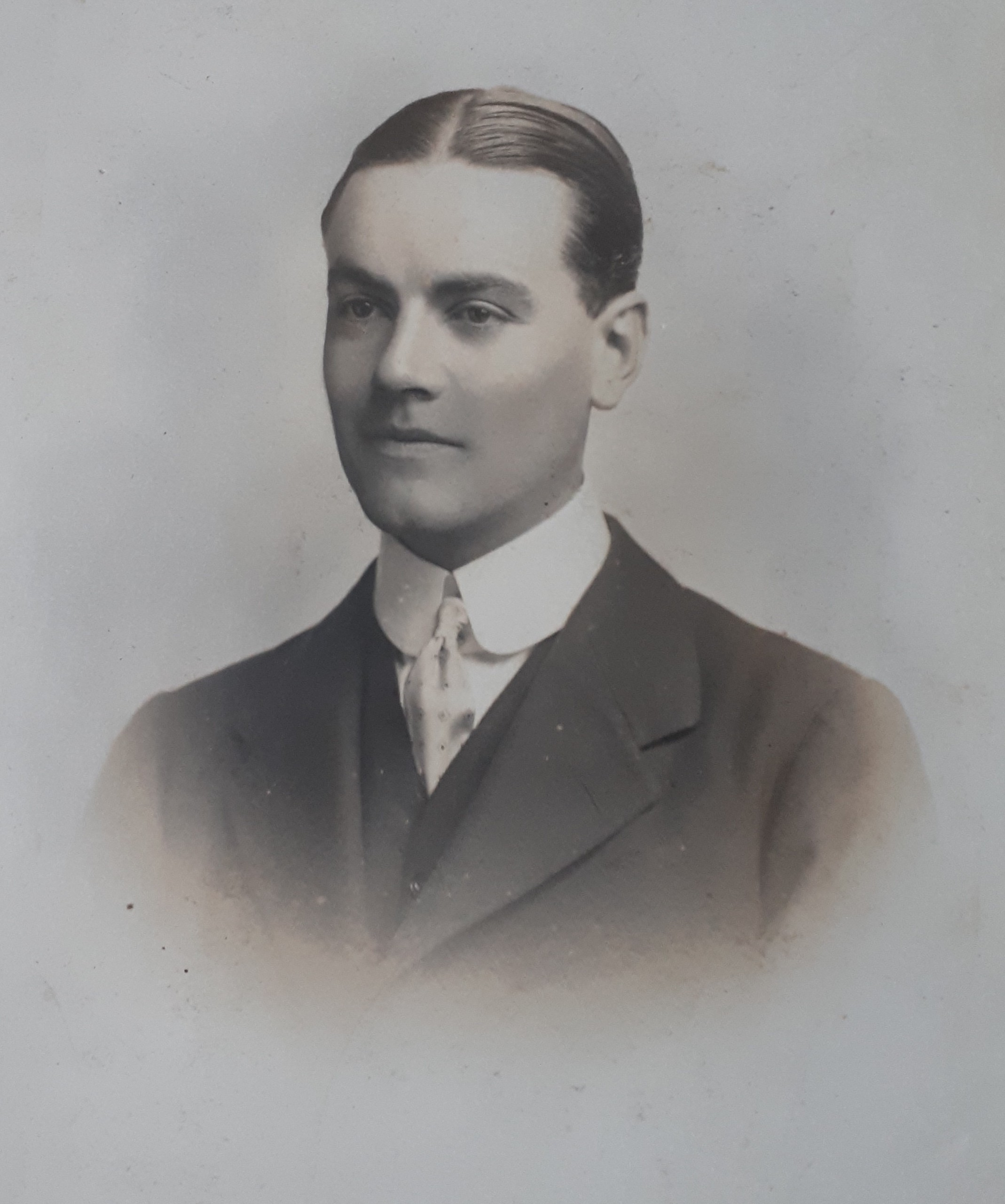
Sir James Cotter, 5th Baronet of Rockforest

- Sir James Cotter, 1st Baronet (c. 1714–1770)
- Sir James Laurence Cotter, 2nd Baronet (c. 1748–1829)
- Sir James Laurence Cotter, 3rd Baronet (c. 1787–1834)
- Sir James Laurence Cotter, 4th Baronet (1828–1902)
- Sir James Laurence Cotter, 5th Baronet (1887–1924)
- Sir Delaval James Alfred Cotter, 6th Baronet (1911–2001).
- Sir Patrick Laurence Delaval Cotter, 7th Baronet (1941–2023).
- Sir Julius Laurence George Cotter, 8th Baronet (born 1968)

== Present baronet ==
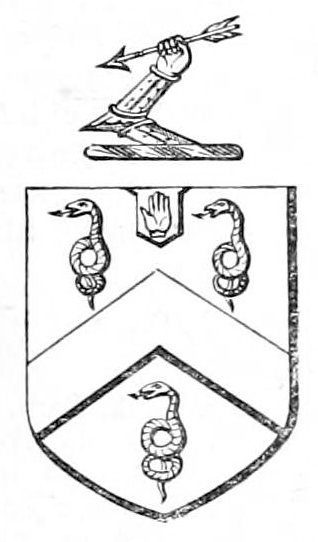
Argent a chevron gules between three serpents proper, Cotter

Sir Julius Laurence George Cotter, 8th Baronet (born 4 January 1968), is an Irish baronet and actor. Born in Dublin, Ireland, he is the only son of the 7th Baronet of Rockforest, and his wife Janet Marjorie Patricia Potter, and the grand-nephew of Lt. Col. Sir Delaval Cotter, 6th Baronet, DSO.. He succeeded his father as the 8th Baronet of Rockforest (1763) on 11 January 2023.

Cotter was educated at Allhallows College, Rousden, and the University of East London, where he graduated with a BA Honours Degree in Fine Art and Film Theory. He worked as gallery assistant at the Michael Parkin Fine Art gallery in Motcomb street, Belgravia, London (before its closure in 1999), and later as an Assistant Director for Production Companies in Spain. Cotter broke away from his family's traditional military and political background and, since 2010, has been working professionally as an actor in film and television. He is credited as Julius Cotter and is known for playing Hugh Fleming in the series Truth (2018) and Diosdado in the series Silent Cargo (2024). He lives between England and Spain.

== See also ==
- Cotter family
- James Fitz Edmond Cotter
- James Cotter the Younger
- Óttar of Dublin
- Kingdom of Dublin
- Ottir
- Norse–Gaels

== Sources ==
- Kidd, Charles, Williamson, David (editors). Debrett's Peerage and Baronetage (1990 edition). New York: St Martin's Press, 1990,
- Burkes Peeerage and Baronetage (1839, 6th edition, pages 244, 245).
- Burkes Peeerage and Baronetage (1846, 8th edition, pages 245, 246).
- Burkes Peeerage and Baronetage (1915, 77th edition, pages 522, 523).
- Debrett's Peerage and Baronetage (1955 edition, pages 216, 217, 218).
- Debrett's Peerage and Baronetage (2001 edition, page 263).
- Debrett's Peerage and Baronetage (online 2023) – Cotter, Bt (I) 1763, of Rockforest, Cork – Julius Laurence George Cotter, 8th Baronet
