= National Association of Women Judges =

American professional organization

- Abbreviation: NAWJ
- Founded: 1979
- Headquarters: Washington, D.C., United States
- Coordinates: 38.909031°N 77.037053°W
- President: Hon. Elizabeth White
- Executive Director: Laurie Hein Denham
- President-Elect: Hon. Toni Clarke
- Website: www.nawj.org

National Association of Women Judges (NAWJ) is an American professional organization founded in 1979. Members are lawyers and women judges who are dedicated to preserving judicial independence to women, minorities and other historically disfavored groups while increasing the number and advancement of women judges, and providing judicial education. The NAWJ is not to be confused with the International Association of Women Judges, which is a separate organization that was born out of the NAWJ's ten-year anniversary conference.

== Founding ==
University of Wisconsin-Milwaukee political science professor Beverly Blair Cook developed the idea for the National Association of Women Judges while she was conducting interviews with women state judges across the country and soon realized that the women knew little other women in the same positions as them. She introduced the idea to two justices on the California Courts of Appeal she had interviewed, the Honorable Vaino Spencer and the Honorable Joan Dempsey Klein, who helped take her idea from non-existence to what would become a tangible organization. At its inception, the NAWJ had only 100 members. Cook went on to give the keynote address at the first annual meeting in 1979, held in Los Angeles, California, and Judge Klein became the organization's first president. Both Judge Joan Dempsey Klein and Judge Vaino Spencer went on to have extremely long, successful judicial careers both on and off the bench and within and without of the National Association of Women Judges.

The inaugural meeting was held on October 25, 1979, in Los Angeles, as mentioned previously. A network of over forty women helped Spencer and Klein to plan, organize, advertise and garner support for the event which gathered an attendance of about 100 women judges from across the country. Among the first resolutions posted by the membership of the NAWJ, at their founding event, was a call to ratify the Equal Rights Amendment, and an expression of support for the nomination of a woman judge to the Supreme Court. The NAWJ referred to the need for a woman on the Supreme Court as their "most critical problem" and nonetheless, Justice Sandra Day O'Connor was nominated to the Supreme Court two years after the founding of the NAWJ. Additionally at their inaugural event the NAWJ, the organization laid out a set of goals including advocating for increased female presence in the judiciary and speaking out against sex discrimination among many other goals. With the exception of advocating for the Equal Rights Amendment, these goals have lasted the test of time and are outlined in the Association's by-laws which are published on their website, with their last revision occurring on October 9, 2016.

The NAWJ established the Foundation for Women Judges in 1980 as their non-profit educational counterpart. In 1986, the non-profit changed their name to the Women Judges Fund for Justice and in 1990 the fund was folded back into the National Association of Women Judges.

== Organization ==
The Association is divided into fourteen regional districts, each of which has an elected district director that oversees their geographic district and serves for a term of two years. Further, the Association is guided by both an executive committee, consisting of a President, President-Elect, Vice-Presidents, Treasurer, Secretary, immediate Past President, and the chairs of the Projects Committee and the Finance Committee, and an organizational staff. The current president is the Honorary Tanya Kennedy of the New York Supreme Court, who is to be followed by the Honorary Tamila Ipema of the Superior Court of California, San Diego County. The current executive director is Marie Kosimar, who has had an extensive career in non-profit organizations and earned her Masters in Public Administration from the Wagner School at New York University. Leadership is also supplemented by 32 committees that govern different areas within the NAWJ, whether it is policy concerns or management related issues. Each committee is headed by a committee chair and supported by a number of NAWJ member judges.

=== Committees ===
The NAWJ is organized into committees that focus on several areas of operation and policy interest. The committees are:

- Administrative Judiciary
- Audit and Compliance
- Awards
- Conference Site Selection
- Domestic Violence
- Diversity and Inclusion
- Ethics
- Fairness and Access
- Finance
- Human Trafficking
- Immigration
- International Outreach
- Judicial Education/Academic Network
- Judicial Independence
- Juvenile Justice and Child Welfare
- Law School Outreach
- LBGTQ
- Membership Outreach and Retention
- Nominating
- Projects
- Resolutions
- Retired/Senior Judges
- Women in Prison

== Activities ==
The Association publishes statistics and policy reports on gender and the judiciary, holds annual meetings, publishes a law journal and offers scholarships for law students, and awards for outstanding career judges. With the National Organization for Women they created the National Judicial Education Project, to raise awareness of gender issues in courts, including such topics as domestic violence and sexual harassment which is discussed in further detail below. Additionally, they publish yearly reports in conjunction with Forster-Long Inc. on the gender representation in American courts, conveniently named the Forster-Long Gender Diversity Survey. This survey publishes a Gender Ratio Summary which provides a snapshot of the current female-male distribution of both federal and state judgeships as part of their push to increase female presence in the judiciary.

=== Programming ===
The National Association of Women Judges conducts educational events, training, and outreach across the country throughout the year on numerous areas of interest including but not limited to human trafficking, women in prison, administrative, military, and specialty courts, and programs encouraging women lawyers to consider judgeships. Further, the NAWJ holds Midyear meetings and Annual Conferences that serve the purpose of discussing and voting on NAWJ bylaws and other resolutions, hosting keynote speakers, and discussing topical issues in the field. Some of the resolutions that have been passed at annual conferences in the past include resolutions on Improving the Condition of Women in Prison and Diversity in Trial Court Appointments, which were both passed at the 2016 annual conference in Seattle, WA. Other resolutions, such as those on VAWA Reauthorization and Federal Judicial Vacancies, can be passed by an online vote and announced by the President via the website.

Further, there are a number of specific initiatives that the NAWJ has been hosting and working on in the past few years, both working towards increasing the presence of women in the judiciary and providing assistance to women who are already judges. Programs such as "From the Bar to the Bench" and "Color of Justice Program" work on recruiting women into the judiciary. "From the Bar to the Bench" encourages women who are already lawyers to consider moving forward with careers as judges, while the "Color of Justice Program" is a program aimed at encouraging female minorities at all ages to consider legal careers. The "Color of Justice Program" connects women with female lawyer and judge mentors in hopes of encouraging them to pursue legal careers. Another program that the NAWJ runs is called "MentorJet". "MentorJet" is a speed dating program of sorts that works to connect students with access to female judges and lawyers who provide the students with advice and guidance on legal careers. Beyond mentorship programs, the NAWJ also hosts educational programming in important areas such as human trafficking, women in prison, and bankruptcy court among a few. These projects are aimed at informing female judges on the status of these issues in society and providing them with resources and a better understanding in their practice. The NAWJ website has numerous resources for the many projects and programs that they run that are available to the public.

=== Events and conferences ===
The NAWJ hosts a series of events and conferences throughout the country and throughout the year on a variety of different topics. Each year, the Association hosts a mid-year meeting in April and an annual conference in October. These national conferences have themes that drive discussion and highlight key areas of interest for the organization. For example, the 2015 Midyear Meeting was title "Voices of Justice: Keeping the Promise of the Rule of Law Through Enhancing Judicial Diversity and Leadership", and the 2013 Annual Conference was titled "Judging and all that Jazz", due to the fact that it was hosted in New Orleans, Louisiana. Schedules of events, as well as information on planning committees and sponsorship of the conferences, can be found on the NAWJ for both upcoming and previous conferences. These conferences can host a wide range of events, from film screenings, to panel discussions, keynote speakers, and other local events, such as a Supreme Court tour that was hosted the year a midyear meeting was held in Washington, DC. For many years, transcripts of the proceedings at the annual conventions and mid-year meetings were published in the Women's Law Journal, a product of the National Association of Women Lawyers.

=== National Judicial Education Program ===
The NAWJ became a co-sponsor to the National Judicial Education Program to Promote Equality for Women and Men in the Courts (NJEP) program launched in 1980 by the National Organization for Women's Legal Defense and Education Fund, now known as Legal Momentum. The NJEP works to promote equality in the judicial system through education, publications, and supporting the efforts of gender bias task forces in courts across the country. NJEP's educational programming is used widely across the country in both print and video format for lawyers, judges, and other professionals alike, focusing on unique issues women face in both criminal and civil cases and other ways women are impacted in the judiciary. As part of the NJEP, these organizations have published Gender, Justice and Law: From Asylum to Zygotes - Issues and Resources for Judicial, Legal and Continuing Legal Education, a 500-page book covering over 60 topics regarding the relationship between the legal system and gender bias. This is only one of the many publications that have resulted from this project. Further, the NJEP was the facilitator of gender bias task forces all across the country in state and federal courthouses alike. Since the founding of the NJEP, over 41 reports from different task forces have been published and are often cited by judges in ruling on gender bias and discrimination cases.

=== International Association of Women Judges ===
The National Association of Women Judges marked its tenth anniversary in 1989 by inviting forty-five international female judges from various countries to its anniversary conference, where the idea for the International Association of Women Judges (IAWJ) was born. The organization held its inaugural meeting in San Diego, California, in October 1992 in conjunction with the NAWJ's annual meeting, where over 40 nations were in attendance. When the IAWJ was founded, it had five principal objectives:

1. Work for the creation and growth of women judge organizations
2. Organize and encourage action among female judges to address legal issues and issues of inequality for all people
3. Expand the network of shared information and legal research between organizations
4. Increase the presence of women in the judiciary
5. Mitigate the effects of gender bias in the judiciary

Since its inception, the IAWJ has surpassed a roster of 4,000 members who work to increase the presence of women in the judiciary as well as end the influence of gender bias in the justice system and advance other women's issues in international courts. Additionally, it has furthered its objectives beyond the five listed previously in the twenty years that it has existed as an organization. The IAWJ organizes educational programming and other events to advance their ideals and goals as well as encourage female participation in the judiciary around the world.

== Leadership ==
=== Presidents ===
Past and current presidents:

- Joan Dempsey Klein (1981–1981)
- Vaino Spencer (1981–1982)
- Gladys Kessler (1982–1983)
- Clarice Williams (1983–1984)
- Martha Craig Daugherty (1984–1985)
- Sybil Hart Kooper (1985–1986)
- Christine M. Durham (1986–1987)
- Judith McConnell (1987–1988)
- Marilyn Loftus (1988–1989)
- Sophia H. Hall (1989–1990)
- Bernice Bouie Donald (1990–1991)
- Cara Lee Neville (1991–1992)
- Brenda P. Murray (1992–1993)
- Judith M. Billings (1993–1994)
- Betty Weinburg Ellerin (1994–1995)
- Cindy S. Lederman (1995–1996)
- Shirley A. Tolentino (1996–1997)
- Barbara A. Zúñiga (1997–1998)
- Mary M. Schroeder (1998–1999)
- Gina L. Hale (1999–2000)
- Noel Anketell Kramer (2000–2001)
- Karla Moskowitz (2001–2002)
- Bea Ann Smith (2002–2003)
- Carolyn Engel Temin (2003–2004)
- Sandra Thompson (2004–2005)
- Vanessa Ruiz (2005–2006)
- Brenda Stith Loftin (2006–2007)
- Fernande R.V. Duffly (2007–2008)
- La Tia W. Martin (2008–2009)
- Dana Fabe (2009–2010)
- Majorie Laird Carter (2010–2011)
- Amy L. Nechtem (2011–2012)
- Joan V. Churchill (2012–2013)
- Anna Blackburne-Rigsby (2013–2014)
- Julie E. Frantz (2014–2015)
- Lisa S. Walsh (2015–2016)
- Diana Becton (2016–2017)
- Tanya Kennedy (2017–2018)
- Tamila Ipema (2018–2019)
- Bernadette D'Souza (2019-2020)
- Karen Donohue (2020-2021)
- Elizabeth White (2021-2022)
- Toni E. Clarke (2022–2023)
- Karen Sage (2023–2024)

=== District Directors ===
- District 1 (ME, MA, NH, PR, RI) - MaryLou Muirhead
- District 2 (CT, NY, VT) - Cenceria Edwards
- District 3 (DE, NJ, PA, Virgin Islands) - Barbara McDermott
- District 4 (DC, MD, VA) - Judith Kline
- District 5 (FL, GA, NC, SC) - Sara Doyle
- District 6 (AL, LA, MS, TN) - Sheva Sims
- District 7 (MI, OH, WV) - Michelle Rick
- District 8 (IL, IN, KY) - Casandra Lewis
- District 9 (IA, MO, WI) - Ellen Siwak
- District 10 (KS, MN, NE, ND, SD) - Renee Worke
- District 11 (AR, OK, TX) - Karen Sage
- District 12 (AZ, CO, NM, UT, WY) - Emily Anderson
- District 13 (AK, HI, ID, MT, WA, OR) - Karen Donohue
- District 14 (CA, NV) - Pennie Mc Laughlin
- International director - Lisa Walsh
