= Éadbhard de Nógla =

Éadbhard de Nógla ('Edward Nagle' in English form) (fl. 1748) was an Irish tailor and Jacobite poet.

== Biography ==
De Nógla was a descendant of Jocelyn de Angulo and a son of the lawyer, Patrick Nagle (a close friend of executed Jacobite, James Cotter the Younger).
