= Beverly Blair Cook =

American professor and political scientist

- Born: December 10, 1926
- Died: January 18, 2008 (aged 81)
- Occupations: Professor and political scientist
- Known for: Work in judicial behavior and the selection of female judges
- Spouse: Cornelius P. Cotter
- Children: 8
- Awards: Lifetime Achievement Award from the APSA's Law and Courts section

Academic background
- Education: Wellesley College (B.A., 1948); University of Wisconsin–Madison (M.A., 1949)
- Alma mater: Claremont Graduate University (Ph.D., 1962)

Academic work
- Discipline: Political Scientist
- Institutions: Iowa State University; California State University, Fullerton; University of Wisconsin–Milwaukee

Beverly Blair Cook (December 10, 1926 – January 18, 2008) was an American professor and political scientist. She is best known for her work regarding judicial behavior, public opinion and judicial decisions, and the selection of female judges.

== Education ==
Cook received a B.A. degree in political science from Wellesley College in 1948 and an M.A. degree from University of Wisconsin–Madison in 1949. After a brief period in which she raised her first four children, she resumed her studies and received a Ph.D. from Claremont Graduate University in 1962.

== Career ==
Cook taught political science at Iowa State University from 1949 to 1950. After receiving her Ph.D., she taught at California State University, Fullerton until 1966, where she earned tenure. She published a book the next year, The Judicial Process in California, which connected the judicial process to the political process.

In 1967, she transferred to the University of Wisconsin–Milwaukee. There, she taught briefly in the School of Social Welfare before joining the Department of Political Science, where she was a professor from 1970 to 1989 and a professor emerita from then on.

In the 1970s, she contributed greatly to the study of judicial socialization. She studied and wrote about the impact of institutional socialization practices in court systems. In particular, she looked at state and federal courts, not just the U.S. Supreme Court, which was the focus of many of her academic peers. In 1977, she began to gather data about women who served as judges. She used this data to populate a groundbreaking database of every female state and federal judge. Using this data, she wrote about the factors that enable women to become judges, including gatekeepers who take women candidates seriously.

She served on the Board of Overseers for the National Science Foundation's project on the U.S. Supreme Court, which culminated in the United States Supreme Court Judicial Database, which has remained in continuous use.

In 1979, she co-founded the National Association of Women Judges (NAWJ). Their numbers grew, and in 1980, Cook led the NAWJ in attending a special tour of the U.S. Supreme Court. At the time, there were no women among the Supreme Court justices. The crowd of NAWJ members in the building so affected Chief Justice Warren E. Burger that, one month after their visit, the Court dropped "Mr." (in reference to justices) from its official record-keeping practices. (A year later, Sandra Day O'Connor became the first woman to serve on the U.S. Supreme Court.)

After retiring, Cook continued to write essays on legal matters, including on U.S. Supreme Court Decisions. In 2000, Cook received the Lifetime Achievement Award from the American Political Science Association's Law and Courts section.

== Bibliography ==
=== Books ===
- The Judicial Process in California (1967)
- Women in the Judicial Process (co-authored), part of the American Political Science Association series Citizenship and Change: Women and American Politics (1987)

=== Selected articles ===
- "The Socialization of New Federal Judges: Impact on District Court Business," published in Washington University Law Quarterly (1971)
- "Sentencing Behavior of Federal Judges: Draft Cases - 1972," published in University of Cincinnati Law Review (1973)
- "Public Opinion and Federal Judicial Policy," published in American Journal of Political Science, vol. 21, no, 3 (August 1977)
- "Women Judges: The End of Tokenism," published in the book Women in the Courts by W.L. Hepperle & L. Crites (1978)
- "Ghosts and Giants in Judicial Politics," published in PS: Political Science and Politics, vol. 27, no. 1 (March 1994)

== Personal life ==
Cook met and married the political scientist Cornelius P. Cotter in 1966. Cook and Cotter both joined the faculty of the University of Wisconsin–Milwaukee, but the school claimed that there was an administrative rule that barred both from teaching in the same department. While Cotter joined the Department of Political Science, Cook taught in the School of Social Welfare until she had convinced the university that the rule was nonexistent and contradicted federal law. Beginning in 1970, she joined the faculty of the Department of Political Science.

Cook raised four children and four step-children with Cotter.
