= Sir James Cotter, 2nd Baronet =

Anglo-Irish politician

Sir James Cotter 2nd Baronet of Rockforest
- Predecessor: Sir James Cotter, 1st Baronet of Rockforest
- Successor: Sir James Cotter, 3rd Baronet of Rockforest
- Born: 1748
- Died: 1829 (aged 80–81)
- Residence: Rockforest, Mallow
- Spouses: Anne Kearney; Isabella Hingston
- Issue: Reverend John Rogerson Cotter; Isabella Cotter; Henrietta Cotter; Thomasine Cotter; Sir James Laurence Cotter, 3rd Baronet; Reverend George Edmond Cotter; Nelson Kearney Cotter
- Parents: Sir James Cotter, 1st Baronet; Arabella Rogerson
- Occupation: Member of Parliament in the Irish House of Commons representing Taghmon; High Sheriff of County Cork

Sir James Laurence Cotter, 2nd Baronet of Rockforest (1748 – 9 February 1829) was an Anglo-Irish politician.

Cotter was the eldest son of Sir James Cotter, 1st Baronet and Arabella Rogerson. He was a Member of Parliament in the Irish House of Commons, representing Taghmon from 1771 to 1776 and Mallow from 1783 to 1790. In 1781 he was appointed to the office of High Sheriff of County Cork. In 1790 he was elected in both Dingle and Castlemartyr, choosing to sit for the latter until the seat's disenfranchisement under the Acts of Union 1800.

On 9 June 1770, he succeeded to the father's baronetcy. He married, firstly, Anne Kearney, daughter of Francis Kearney. He married, secondly, Isabella Hingston, daughter of Reverend James Hingston, by whom he had seven children. Upon his death, Cotter was succeeded in his titles by his son, Sir James Cotter, 3rd Baronet.

== See also ==
- Cotter baronets
- Cotter family
- James Fitz Edmond Cotter
- James Cotter the Younger
- Óttar of Dublin

Parliament of Ireland
Preceded by John Hatch; James Willson	Member of Parliament for Taghmon; 1771–1776; With: James Willson	Succeeded by Thomas Pigott; William Alexander English
Preceded by Denham Jephson; Anthony Jephson	Member of Parliament for Mallow; 1783–1790; With: Denham Jephson	Succeeded by Denham Jephson; John Longfield
Preceded by Henry Cox; Broderick Chinnery	Member of Parliament for Castlemartyr; 1790–1800; With: Charles O'Neill (1790–1792); John Hobson (1792–1798); John Townsend (1798–1800)	Succeeded by Constituency disenfranchised
Baronetage of Ireland
Preceded by James Cotter	Baronet (of Rockforest); 1770–1829	Succeeded by James Laurence Cotter
