= Ottar Dahl =

Norwegian historian and historiographer

Ottar Dahl (5 January 1924 – 4 April 2011) was a Norwegian historian and historiographer.

Dahl was born in Nannestad. He took the dr. philos. degree in 1957, worked at the University of Oslo as a scholarship holder from 1957, docent from 1960 and professor from 1966 to 1991. He then retired to a position as professor emeritus.

Dahl was a member of the Norwegian Academy of Science and Letters. From 1972 to 1975 he chaired the Norwegian Historical Association. He died in April 2011.

== Selected bibliography ==
- Historisk materialisme. Historiesynet hos Koht og Bull, 1952
- Om årsaksproblemer i historisk forskning, 1957
- Norsk historieforskning i det 19. og 20. århundre, 1959
- Grunntrekk i historieforskningens metodelære, 1967
- Problemer i historiens teori, 1986
- Fra konsens til katastrofe - kapitler av fascismens historie i Italia, 1996
