= Cornelius P. Cotter =

American professor of political science

Cornelius (Neil) Philip Cotter (March 18, 1924 – July 12, 1999) was an American professor of political science. His research focused on civil rights and American political parties.

== Early life and education ==
Cotter was born in New York City to family involved in local politics. (His parents were reform Democrats; Cotter would later join the Republican Party.) He did not finish high school, but worked on the docks during World War II. After an injury, he spent a year in the hospital before enlisting in the Navy in 1943. Cotter served in the Marshall Islands, assigned to managing records of military trials.

Taking advantage of the G.I. Bill, Cotter received an A.B. degree from Stanford University in 1949. He went on to earn a Masters of Public Administration (1951) and Ph.D. (1953) in Public Administration from Harvard University. While he attended school, he supported himself and his family as the business manager of a New Jersey summer theater company. He completed further studies at the London School of Economics as a Sheldon Traveling Fellow in 1951-1952.

== Career ==
=== Academia ===
In 1952-1953, Cotter taught as an instructor at Columbia University. In 1953, he joined the faculty of Stanford University, where he became an associate professor in 1956. In 1963, he joined the faculty of Wichita State University as a department chair. He moved to the University of Wisconsin–Milwaukee in 1967, where he was department chair from 1969 to 1972 and associate dean for graduate research from 1973 to 1975. He retired in 1989.

He conducted research about American political parties and institutional change, including work (with John F. Bibby) on a National Science Foundation grant, "Party Transformation in the United States and the Institutional Party" (1978-1981). The research from this grant was written up in many articles and in a book, Party Organizations in American Politics (1984).

In 1968, he published Jet Tanker Crash: Urban Response to Military Disaster, about the 1965 USAF KC-135 Wichita crash, which he witnessed. He followed up on the disaster by documenting the accident report and ensuing lawsuits.

=== Political work ===
Cotter is noted as the executive director of the Republican Committee on Program and Progress. The committee was established in 1959 by Meade Alcorn, then the Republican National Chairman. President Dwight D. Eisenhower and other party leaders were concerned that the GOP would be defeated at the polls in 1958 unless they could articulate their policy positions. The committee, which consisted of 44 Republicans from various backgrounds, was chaired by Charles H. Percy, president of Bell and Howell.

Cotter was named a Republican National Committee Faculty Fellow in 1959. In 1960, he was also an assistant to Meade Alcorn, then the chairman of the Republican National Committee, and his successor, Senator Thruston Ballard Morton.

President Eisenhower appointed Cotter to the staff of the U.S. Civil Rights Commission in 1960. He worked with the commission on research and hearings, particularly in the South, until 1963. He continued to work with the Civil Rights Commission after moving to Wisconsin, serving on the state advisory committee.

== Personal life ==
Cotter married to Beverly Blair Cook in 1966. She was also a notable professor of political science at the University of Wisconsin–Milwaukee. They raised 8 children and step-children.

He died in 1999 after sustaining injuries in a car crash.

== Bibliography ==
Cotter's works include:

- Party Organizations in American Politics (Praeger, 1984), co-authored with James L. Gibson, John F. Bibby, and Robert J. Huckshorn
- "The Black student in the Wisconsin State universities system" (1971), United States Commission on Civil Rights, Wisconsin State Committee
- Practical Politics in the United States (Allyn and Bacon, 1969), co-authored with Herbert E. Alexander
- Jet Tanker Crash: Urban Response to Military Disaster (University Press of Kansas, 1968)
- Politics Without Power: The National Party Committees (first published by Atherton Press, 1964), co-authored with Bernard C. Hennessy
- "Civil Rights '63" (1963), primary author
- "Freedom to the Free" (1963), primary author
- "50 States Report" (1961), primary author
- Issues of the Sixties (Wadsworth, 1961), co-authored with Leonard Freedman
- Government and Private Enterprise (1960)
- Powers of the President During Crises (Da Capo Press, 1960), co-authored with John Malcolm Smith
