= Otterson =

Otterson is a surname. Notable people with the surname include:

- Billy Otterson (1862–1940), American baseball player
- Jack Otterson (1905–1991), American art director
- Joel Otterson (born 1959), American artist
- John E. Otterson (1881–1964), American engineer and business executive
- Michael Otterson, managing director of Public Affairs for The Church of Jesus Christ of Latter-day Saints
- Ryan Otterson (born 1986), American football offensive tackle
- Suzanne Otterson (born 1974), British figure skater
