= A. C. Cotter =

Jesuit theologian, neo-scholastic, educator, and author

Rev. Anthony Charles Cotter SJ STD or A. C. Cotter (1879–1954) was a Jesuit theologian, neo-scholastic, and author in the first half of the 20th century.

== Life ==
=== Biography ===
Anthony Cotter SJ was born Anthony Kottermair on September 21, 1879, in Ainried, Bavaria, Germany to Wolfgang Kottermair. On December 14, 1924, he became a citizen of the United States.

He entered the Society of Jesus on October 20, 1899, and was ordained in 1913, after having taught as a professor from 1905 to 1910 at Canisius College in Buffalo, New York. He officially changed his name from Kottermair to Cotter, the name he was already known by in the Society, shortly after becoming a U.S. citizen.

He obtained a Doctorate in Sacred Theology, probably sometime between 1939 and 1942, as is gathered from his various journal articles, namely, TU ES PETRUS, published in 1942 signed ANTHONY C. COTTER, S.J., S.T.D., compared with his previous articles, all signed without the "S.T.D.", including the last article before the "S.T.D." signature, THE ESCHATOLOGICAL DISCOURSE of July 1939.

He died on June 13, 1954, in Boston, having taught at Weston College for 29 years.

=== Teaching and writing ===
He taught for the Society at Woodstock College, before he, along with Fr. Henry A. Coffey, came to Weston, MA in order to teach. He taught cosmology there from 1924 to 1927, in which time he composed his textbook Cosmologia. His works include:

- Latin Exercise Book (1907, English)
- Fr. Erich Wasmann on Evolution (1927, English), a short summary, intended for private circulation among the Jesuits, of Fr. Wasmann's views concerning evolution (see below for online version)
- Cosmologia (1931, Latin), a textbook on Cosmology (see above)
- Logic and Epistemology (1930, revised 1931 and 1936, English), written with "brevity, plain and direct presentation, close-knit reasoning and logical coherence" in mind (preface) (see below for online version)
- Theologia Fundamentalis (1940, revised 1947?, Latin), a textbook on fundamental theology (see below for online version)
- The ABCs of Scholastic Philosophy (1946, English), "an expansion of Logic and Epistemology" (preface) (see below for online version)
- Natural Species: an Essay in Definition and Classification (1947, English), an essay opposing "virtually all aspects of evolutionary theory"
- Various other short theological articles and book reviews from 1939 to 1950
- The Encyclical "Humani Generis" (with a Commentary) (1951, revised 1952, English with original Latin of the encyclical too), a commentary on the encyclical as a whole, the first (according to Cotter) of its kind (see below for online version)

== Uploaded works ==
- Cotter, Theologia Fundamentalis, 1940 (Latin): https://archive.org/details/theologia-fundamentalis/page/n9/mode/2up
- Cotter, Logic and Epistemology, 1930 (English): https://archive.org/details/cotter-logic-epistemology
- Cotter, ABC of Scholastic Philosophy, 1946 (English): https://archive.org/details/1949A.CotterABCOfScholasticPhilosophy600dpiBWOCR/page/n5/mode/2up
- Cotter, “ Natural Species: An essay in definition and classification”, 1947: https://archive.org/details/bwb_T5-AWA-451/page/n2/mode/1up
- Cotter, Humani Generis (with a Commentary), 1952 (English and Latin): https://archive.org/details/cotter-hg-commentary
- Cotter (January–February 1927). "Fr. Erich Wasmann on Evolution" (PDF). Bulletin of the American Association of Jesuit Scientists. 4 (3): 27–31.
