= Brigid Cotter =

Irish chemist and barrister

Brigid Mary Cotter
- Born: Brigid Mary Cotter; 3 January 1921; Roscommon
- Died: 20 November 1978 (aged 57); Dublin

Brigid Mary Cotter (3 January 1921 – 20 November 1978), was a pioneering Irish chemist and barrister.

== Early life and education ==
Cotter was born in Roscommon to Nicholas Patrick Cotter and Bridie O'Brien on 3 January 1921. Her father was the chief agricultural officer for Roscommon. She had eleven younger siblings. Cotter was educated by both the Convent of Mercy, Roscommon, and the Ursuline Convent, Sligo. After secondary school Cotter attended University College, Dublin where in 1944 she graduated with a bachelor in science in both chemistry and mathematics. She continued to achieve her masters the following year with a thesis on epanorin, a chemical constituent of the lichen Lecanora epanora. After graduation Cotter worked in the university for another year as a chemistry demonstrator as well as working for the Medical Research Council on atmospheric pollution in Dublin; Cotter achieved diplomas in bacteriology and food technology.

== Chemistry career ==
In the period from 1947 to 1948 Cotter lived in the United Kingdom where she worked at the Imperial Chemical Industries laboratories in Manchester on moulds and fungi, including penicillin. On her return to Ireland spent time teaching in Coláiste Ide, Dingle, County Kerry, and went on to spend the next ten years as a chemist in the state laboratory, Dublin during which time she spent 4 years in charge of the bacteriological section. In 1958 she went to work for the Department of agriculture, becoming an agricultural inspector and chief technical officer. She remained in that post until her death.

== Law career ==
Outside of her main work, Cotter qualified in law. She gained a bachelor law degree in 1963, and a masters in 1969, both from the University of London. She was later called to both the English and Irish Bar – the latter in 1972. She worked on various law committees and travelled internationally as part of the International Bar council.

== Legacy ==
Cotter funded three prizes which are awarded to external law students of the University of London. She was a fellow of the Institute of Chemistry of Ireland and a member of the Royal Dublin Society. Cotter was a keen bee-keeper. She died in Dublin on 20 November 1978.
