= Sir James Cotter, 1st Baronet =

Irish politician (1714–1770)

Sir James Cotter 1st Baronet of Rockforest
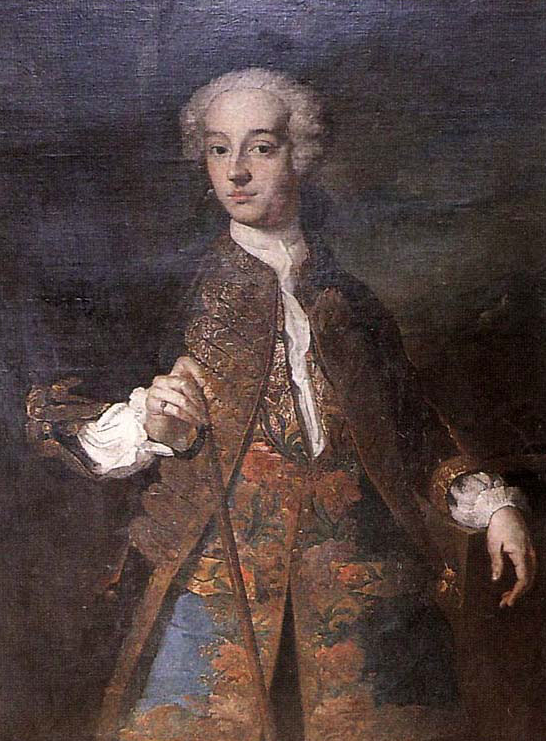
- Sir James Cotter, 1st Baronet of Rockforest by James Latham
- Successor: Sir James Cotter, 2nd Baronet of Rockforest
- Born: 1714
- Died: 1770 (aged 55–56)
- Residence: Rockforest, Mallow
- Spouse: Arabella Rogerson
- Issue: Rogerson Cotter; Sir James Laurence Cotter, 2nd Baronet; Edmund Cotter; Reverend George Sackville Cotter; Sylvester Cotter
- Parents: James Cotter the Younger; Margaret Mathew of Thurles
- Occupation: Member of Parliament for Askeaton

Sir James Cotter, 1st Baronet of Rockforest (1714 – 9 June 1770) was an Irish politician and baronet.

== Career ==
Cotter was born into the Norse-Gaelic Cotter family, the son of James Cotter the Younger (1689–1720), a leading Roman Catholic and Jacobite in County Cork, by his marriage to Margaret Mathew. After his father's death, he was brought up by guardians as a Protestant and educated at Midleton College, a Church of Ireland boarding school in County Cork and Trinity College Dublin.

Cotter served as a Member of Parliament for Askeaton in the Irish House of Commons between 1761 and 1768. On 11 August 1763 he was created a baronet, of Rockforest in the County of Cork, in the Baronetage of Ireland.

In 1746 Cotter married Arabella Rogerson, daughter of Sir John Rogerson, Lord Chief Justice of Ireland, and Elizabeth Ludlow. Arabella was the widow of William Casaubon. Together they had four children.

== See also ==
- Cotter baronets
- Cotter family
- James Fitz Edmond Cotter
- James Cotter the Younger
- Óttar of Dublin

Parliament of Ireland
Preceded by Edmond Malone; Edward Taylor	Member of Parliament for Askeaton; 1761–1768; With: Joseph Hoare	Succeeded by Joseph Hoare
Baronetage of Ireland
New creation	Baronet (of Rockforest); 1763–1770	Succeeded by James Laurence Cotter
