= Blackwater Castle =

Castle in County Cork, Ireland

Coordinates: 52.1705°N 8.4604°W

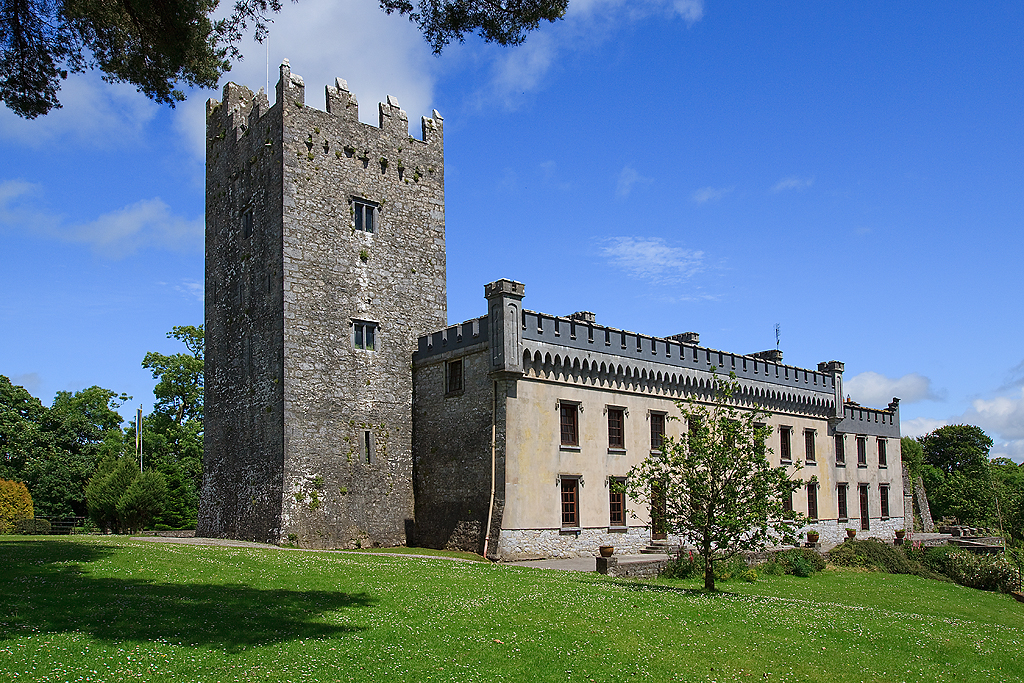
Blackwater Castle, historically known as Castle Widenham

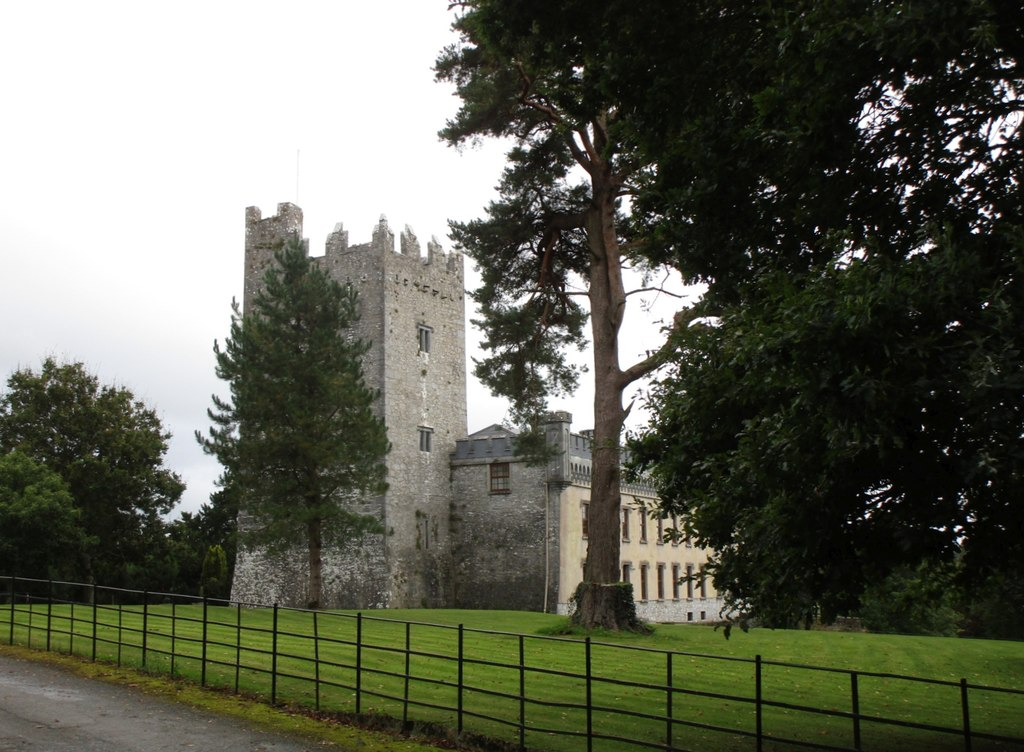
Tower house of Castle Widenham

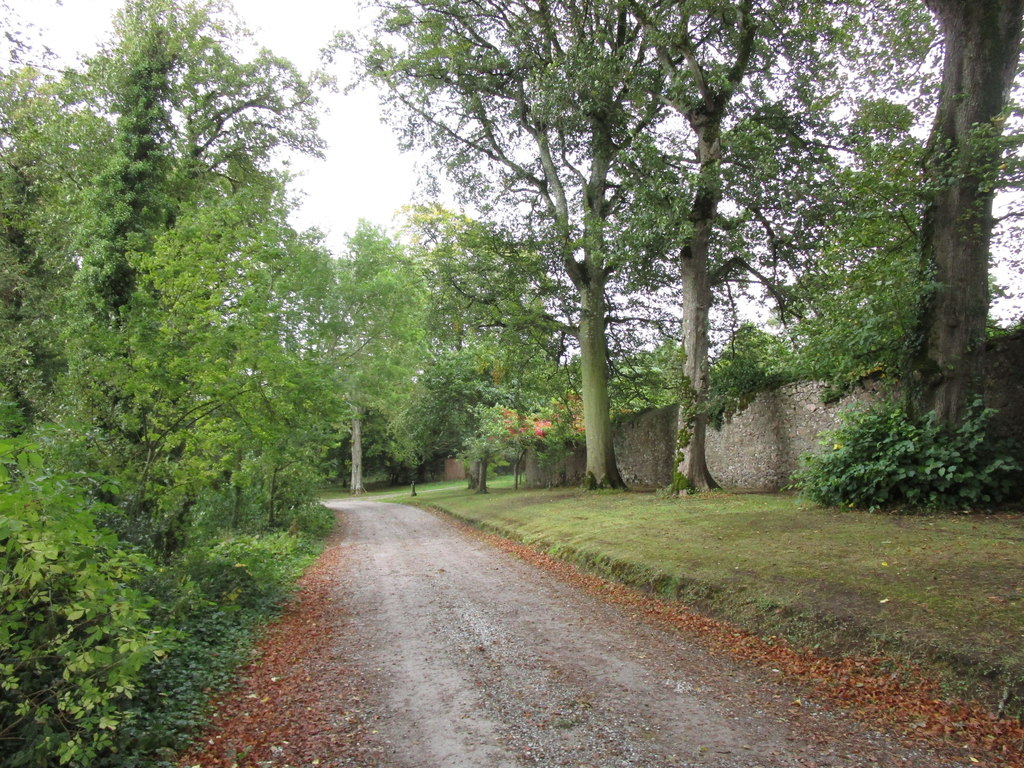
Castle driveway and bawn wall

Blackwater Castle, also and formerly known as Castle Widenham, is a privately owned estate located in the village of Castletownroche between the towns of Mallow and Fermoy in north County Cork, Ireland. Since 2005 it has been available to rent as a private hire venue for castle weddings and private parties along with castle rentals for vacations.

The castle comprises one of the oldest occupied castles in Ireland as parts of the residential section date back to the early 15th century while the castle structure itself dates back to the 12th century. A round tower on the eastern end of the castle, dating from the late 12th century, is still standing although no longer accessible. The castle was constructed on the ancient fortress of Dun Cruadha, an inland promontory fort dating back to the late Bronze Age/early Iron Age, while the site itself was first occupied in the Mesolithic age (circa 9,000 years ago) as evidenced by the flint scatter found at Kilcummer and the caves on the south bank of the River Awbeg.

The Cambro-Norman grandsons of Maurice FitzGerald, Alexander and Raymond FitzHugh, established their fortress on the site of Dun Cruadha in the late 12th century following the Anglo/Cambro - Norman Invasion of Ireland and when Alexander's daughter Synolda married David de la Roche the area subsequently to be known as the Barony of Fermoy became Roche Country. The castle remained in the hands of the Roche family until 1666 when it passed to Colonel John Widenham. Roche Castle then became known as Castle Widenham and stayed within the Widenham family line until the 1960s. It was purchased in the 1960s by Sir Delaval Cotter, 6th Baronet of Rockforest and his wife, who owned it until 1976. During this time they restored the tower. A number of different owners followed during which period the castle was substantially renovated and rebranded as Blackwater Valley Castle until it passed into the hands of the Nordstrom Family Trust in 1991. The Trust works at preserving the heritage of the site by making the castle self-sufficient and the castle, now known as Blackwater Castle, now hosts weddings, private events, and family gatherings. The courtyard of the castle is also home to an adventure centre, Blackwater Outdoor Activities.

In circumstances where the castle was held by the politically powerful and influential Roches for a period of almost 500 years and subsequently by the wealthy (but politically insignificant) Widenhams for a further 300 years much of the heritage on site remains intact making this a heritage site of significance. It is a destination for history and heritage tours as it contains evidence of Mesolithic occupation, late Bronze Age/early Iron Age settlement (inland promontory fort) with evidence of ring barrows and ring forts in the immediate area, a St. Patrick's Holy Well, a Sheela na Gig, Medieval defence walls, a 12th-century tower, a 13th-century watch tower and sentry walk, a 15th-century Norman Keep, the Medieval manuscript The Book of Fermoy (now housed in the Royal Irish Academy), a 17th/18th century courtyard with out-buildings along with a fortified mansion/country house of the post Cromwellian period (subsequently modified and extended).
