= Cottier (surname) =

Cottier is a surname. It is of English origin, but can also be an Americanized form of a French and Swiss surname.

== Origin of the surname ==
The surname Cottier is of English origin and a variant of the surname Cotter. This English surname is a status name, for a cotter. This name is made up of the Old English elements cot "cottage", "hut" and the suffix er. In the feudal system a cotter held a cottage by service (rather than by rent). Similarly, Reaney gives the surname deriving from the Old French cotier "cottager" (see: villein). Early bearers of the English surname are Robert le Robert le Cotier in 1198; and William le Coter(e) in 1270 and 1297.

The surname Cottier, in some cases, is an Americanized form of the French Gauthier. The French surname Gauthier (also found in Switzerland) is derived from a Germanic personal name made up of the elements wald "rule" and hari, heri "army".

== Variations ==
The surname can be rendered into the Irish language and the Manx language as Mac Coitir and Mac Oitir.

== People with the surname ==
- Alex Cottier (born 1973), an English former international footballer.
- Anton Cottier (1943–2006), a Swiss politician.
- Belva Cottier (1920–2000), a Rosebud Sioux activist and social worker.
- Charles Cottier (born 1992), an Australian actor.
- Daniel Cottier (1837–1891), a Scottish artist and stained glass designer.
- Chuck Cottier, (born 1936), an American former baseball player.
- Frédéric Cottier (born 1954), a French equestrian and Olympic medalist.
- Georges Cottier, (1922–2016), a Swiss Cardinal.
- Gérald Cottier (born 1931), a Swiss basketball player.
- Pierre Cottier (born 1908, date of death unknown), a Swiss weightlifter.
