= Ottir =

Norse of Britain and Ireland

Earl Ottir (Óttar jarl)
- Died: 918
- Military career
- Allegiance: Norse of Britain and Ireland
- Rank: Jarl (Earl)
- Conflicts: Raiding and conquests in Munster; Battle of Corbridge

Earl Ottir (Old Norse: Óttar jarl; Medieval Latin: Oter comes, lit. 'Count Oter'; died 918), also known as Ottir the Black (Old Irish: Ottir Dub), was a jarl who occupied a prominent position among the Norse of Britain and Ireland in the early 10th century. He is believed to be the founder of the settlement, Veðrafjǫrðr (present day Waterford) in the year 914. From 917 to his death in 918 Ottir was a close associate of the powerful overking Ragnall ua Ímair, although they are not known to have been related.

== Ireland and family ==
In Ireland, Ottir is particularly associated with raiding and conquests in the province of Munster. The Cogad Gáedel re Gallaib describes him raiding there alongside Ragnall and associates this with the Viking settlement of Cork. Their base for this activity was present day Waterford Harbour. Later the same epic describes Ottir conquering the eastern part of Munster from his seat at Waterford, but it is unclear if he ruled it as king outright or was in any way subject to Ragnall, because the annals offer a different chronology.

Joan Radner has suggested that Ottir is identical to the Ottir mac Iargni who is recorded in the Annals of Ulster killing a son of Auisle in alliance with Muirgel daughter of Máel Sechnaill mac Máele Ruanaid in 883, but Clare Downham describes this identification as "by no means certain". Mary Valante in any case assumes this Ottar and Muirgel were married because he and his father Iercne (died 852) were apparently allies of Máel Sechnaill. Ottir may also have been the father of Bárid mac Oitir who is recorded killed in battle against Ragnall in 914, although this is far from certain because of Ottir's own close association with Ragnall.

== England and Scotland ==
Earl Ottir had a significant career in Britain as well.

=== Anglo-Saxon Chronicle ===
Under the year 918 (for 917), the Anglo-Saxon Chronicle reports:

Here in this year a great raiding ship-army came over here from the south from Brittany, and with them two jarls, Ohtor and Hroald, and went around west until they got into the mouth of the Severn, and raided in Wales everywhere by the sea, where it suited them, and took Cameleac, bishop in Archenfield, and led him with them to the ships; and then King Edward ransomed him back for 40 pounds. Then after that the whole raiding-army went up and wanted to go on a raid against Archenfield; then they were met by the men from Hereford and from Gloucester and from the nearest strongholds, and fought against them and put them to flight, and killed the jarl Hroald and the other Jarl Ohtor's brother and a great part of the raiding-army, and drove them into an enclosure and besieged them there until they gave them hostages, that they would leave King Edward's domain.

— Anglo-Saxon Chronicle (MS A), s.a. 918 [917] (cf. MS D, s.a. 915), tr. Swanton

Another Chronicle scribe, writing in the Worcester Manuscript (p. 99), states that Ohtor and Hroald captured the bishop, Cameleac, in AD 915 and that the jarls were killed in the same year. Their deaths occurred in the battle at "Killdane Field" (or "Kill Dane") in Weston-under-Penyard, per the Herefordshire Historic Environment Record reference no. 12549.

=== Death in battle ===
Ottir died in battle against Constantine II of Scotland in 918. He either joined forces with Ragnall ua Ímair and others, or alternatively may have led a separate expedition on his own. The Annals of the Four Masters report:

M916.14[918]: Oitir and the foreigners went from Loch Dachaech to Alba; and Constantine, the son of Aedh, gave them battle, and Oitir was slain, with a slaughter of the foreigners along with him.

While the Annals of Ulster give a detailed account and place him in Ragnall's army:

U918.4: The foreigners of Loch dá Chaech, i.e. Ragnall, king of the dark foreigners, and the two jarls, Oitir and Gragabai, forsook Ireland and proceeded afterwards against the men of Scotland. The men of Scotland, moreover, moved against them and they met on the bank of the Tyne in northern Saxonland. The heathens formed themselves into four battalions: a battalion with Gothfrith grandson of Ímar, a battalion with the two jarls, and a battalion with the young lords. There was also a battalion in ambush with Ragnall, which the men of Scotland did not see. The Scotsmen routed the three battalions which they saw, and made a very great slaughter of the heathens, including Oitir and Gragabai. Ragnall, however, then attacked in the rear of the Scotsmen, and made a slaughter of them, although none of their kings or earls was cut off. Nightfall caused the battle to be broken off.

The latter describes what is referred to as the Battle of Corbridge.

== See also ==
- Cotter family
- Ohthere of Hålogaland
- Cotter baronets

== Notes ==
Regnal titles
Preceded by none	King of Waterford; 914–917	Succeeded by Ragnall ua Ímair
Preceded by n.a.	King of East Munster; 914–917	Succeeded by Ragnall ua Ímair
