= James Cotter the Younger =

James Cotter the Younger (Irish: Séamus Óg Mac Coitir; 4 August 1689 – 7 May 1720), or James Cotter of Anngrove, was the son of Sir James Fitz Edmond Cotter who had commanded King James's Irish Army forces in the counties of Cork, Limerick, and Kerry. His mother was Eleanor/Ellen Plunkett, daughter of Matthew, 7th Lord Louth, and he was a member of the Irish Cotter family, which had Norse-Gaelic origins. He was a key figure in the 1713 Dublin election riot.

He was born 4 August 1689 and was executed in Cork City on 7 May 1720. His death was seen by many, especially within the Catholic population of Ireland, as a form of political assassination.

== Life ==
At the time of his death he was seen, like his father before him, as the natural leader of the Catholics of Cork. He was also a prominent patron of poetry and other literature in the Irish language (Gaelic). The Irish text Párliament na mBan or 'The Parliament of Women' was dedicated by its author, Domhnall Ó Colmáin,' to a young James Cotter in 1697. As one of the few major landowners of the Catholic faith remaining in Ireland, and as a man of known Jacobite and Tory sympathies he was distrusted by the authorities. He was also held in suspicion by those of his landed neighbours who were part of the Protestant Ascendancy and of Whiggish political views. Amongst his overt political actions he is believed to have played a leading part in the instigation of the election riots of 1713 in Dublin. His trial, ostensibly for rape, was a cause célèbre at the time and widely seen as an example of judicial murder.

Though married, he had a reputation as a ladies' man. His wealth allowed him to flaunt his independence of the Protestant ruling class and anti-Catholic laws of Ireland. These characteristics, allied to his political activities, led to his downfall. He had made an enemy of a powerful neighbour, Alan Brodrick, 1st Viscount Midleton. Brodrick, it appears, arranged that Cotter be accused of abducting and raping a young Quaker woman named Elizabeth Squibb, reported by some to have been Cotter's mistress. When news of this trumped-up or exaggerated charge reached Cork City the Quakers of the town went in fear of their lives for many weeks. Believing the charge could not hold up in court Cotter gave himself up to the Cork sheriff. The judge presiding on the case was, however, Sir St. John Brodrick; who, as a close relative of James Cotter's accuser, was hardly impartial; the jury had also been packed – all twelve of its members were justices of the peace. The trial took place in a period of heightened rumour of Jacobite invasion; a large number of arms for cavalry were found in Cork which triggered a scare until it was discovered that they were government owned and intended for a local militia unit. James Cotter was held in jail, though bail had been granted, and was convicted of the crime. A bizarre element in Cotter's downfall were the pleas for mercy expressed by both the jury which had convicted him and Elizabeth Squibb, his alleged victim. Attempts to gain a pardon in Dublin were proceeding and a stay of execution was sent, however, the hanging was deliberately brought forward and it did not arrive in time. Cotter had attempted to escape and spent the night before his execution in chains. The gallows erected for the execution had been destroyed by some of the citizens of Cork and the hanging was extemporised using a rope attached to a metal staple in a vertical post. James Cotter was hanged in Cork City on 7 May 1720. News of his execution triggered widespread riots on a national scale. He was buried in his family's vault at Carrigtwohill.

Some have also seen the death of James Cotter as the working of a family feud. James' father had been intimately involved in the assassination of the regicide John Lisle in Switzerland (1664). The wife of the Lord Lieutenant of Ireland at the time of James Cotter's trial was a granddaughter of John Lisle.

Up to twenty poems in Irish (Gaelic) survive which reflect the widespread dismay felt at James Cotter's execution., including ones by Éadbhard de Nógla, son of his close friend, the lawyer Patrick Nagle.

A Cork broadsheet of 1720 recorded this tribute to James Cotter:

"Just, Prudent, Pious, everything that’s Great Lodg’d in his breast, and formed the Man complete, His Body may consume, his Virtues shall Recorded be, till the World’s Funeral."

== Family ==
James married Margaret Mathew of Thurles, their elder son was Sir James Cotter, 1st Baronet Cotter of Rockforest, MP for Askeaton, their other children were: Edmond, Ellen and Elizabeth. The authorities intervened in the education of James' children, who were raised as Protestants. This act eliminated another of the families who formed the hereditary leadership of the Catholic community in Ireland.

== See also ==
- Cotter baronets
- Cotter family
- James Fitz Edmond Cotter
- Óttar of Dublin

== Reference and sources ==
Notes

Sources

- Burke, J. (1832) A General and Heraldic Dictionary of the Peerage and Baronetage of the British Empire, Volume 1 H. Colburn and R. Bentley.
- Leland, M. (1999) The lie of the land: Journeys Through Literary Cork, Cork University Press. ISBN 1-85918-231-3
- Lydon, J.F.,(1998) The Making of Ireland: From Ancient Times to the Present, Routledge, ISBN 0-415-01348-8
- Marshall, A. (2003) Intelligence and Espionage in the Reign of Charles II, 1660–1685 Cambridge University Press.
- Nichols, J. G. (1858) The Topographer and Genealogist Vol III, London.
- Ó Cuív, B. (1959) James Cotter, a Seventeenth-Century Agent of the Crown. The Journal of the Royal Society of Antiquaries of Ireland, Vol. 89, No. 2 (1959), pp. 135–159.
- O'Donnel, K. (2000) The Image of a Relationship in Blood. in Eighteenth-Century Ireland / Iris an dá chultúr Vol. 15, (2000), pp. 98–119. Published by: Eighteenth-Century Ireland Society.
