= Eadwulf of Bamburgh =

Eadwulf of Bamburgh or Eadwulf of Bernicia may refer to:

- Eadwulf I of Bamburgh (died AD 913)
- Eadwulf II or Eadwulf Evil-child (fl. AD 963–973), ruler of Bamburgh
- Eadwulf III or Eadwulf Cudel (died 1019), ruler of Bamburgh
- Eadwulf IV of Bamburgh (died 1041)

== See also ==
- Eadwulf of Northumbria
