= Colla mac Báirid =

Viking leader (died 932)

Colla mac/ua Báirid

King of Limerick
- Reign: ?–932
- Predecessor: Tomrair mac Ailchi
- Successor: Amlaíb Cenncairech
- Died: 932
- House: Uí Ímair (possibly)
- Father: Bárid mac Ímair or Bárid mac Oitir (possibly)

Colla mac Báirid or Colla ua Báirid (Old Norse: Kolli (possibly), died 932) was a Viking (Note: The definition as given by Downham is used here - Vikings were "people of Scandinavian culture who were active outside of Scandinavia".) leader who ruled Limerick in the early 10th century. He first appears in contemporary annals in 924 when he is recorded as leading a raiding fleet to Lough Ree. He appears in the annals for the second and final time in 932 when his death his recorded. In both of these instances he is titled king of Limerick. Colla's parentage is uncertain; according to one theory he was the son or grandson of Bárid mac Ímair, a Uí Ímair king of Dublin, and according to another he was the son of Bárid mac Oitir.

== Background ==
A Viking camp at Limerick is first mentioned in contemporary accounts in 845, although it is not clear whether or not it was a permanent settlement. If the site which would later develop into the city of Limerick was indeed founded by Vikings in 845 it is possible that its inhabitants were the "fair foreigners" who were led by Otir in 917 and 918 and are recorded as being subject to the "dark foreigners" of Dublin. (Note: Finngaill and Dubgaill respectively in Old Irish. Historically, it was believed Dubgaill referred to "dark" Danish Vikings and Finngaill referred to "fair" Norwegian Vikings, though that interpretation has been challenged in recent years.) In 922, a Limerick-based jarl named Tomrair mac Ailchi is recorded as leading raids on churches and islands up the River Shannon and elsewhere in Ireland, perhaps in a bid to assert Limerick's independence following the death the previous year of Ragnall ua Ímair, whom contemporary accounts label as "king of Dark and Fair Foreigners". Gofraid ua Ímair, king of the Dublin Vikings in 924 is recorded as attacking Limerick but he lost many men to the forces of Tomrair mac Ailchi.

== Biography ==
Colla mac Báirid is first mentioned in Irish annals in 924 by the Annals of the Four Masters and the Chronicon Scotorum. In these accounts, Colla, titled as lord or king of Limerick, is described as leading a fleet to Lough Ree, whereupon Echtigern mac Flannchad, king of Bregmaine, was killed by Colla and his men. (Note: Bregmaine is the name for the territory roughly contiguous with the barony of Brawny in County Westmeath) He is mentioned in contemporary annals for the second and final time in 932 when the Chronicon Scotorum describes his death. In this particular record he is recorded as Colla ua Báirid, meaning Colla grandson of Bárid, rather than Colla mac Báirid, meaning Colla son of Bárid, which is how he is described by the annals in 924. It is not known whether this is a mistake or not, but these two accounts are believed to refer to the same person.

There are two theories regarding the identity of Colla mac Báirid. In the first, he is a son or grandson of Bárid mac Ímair, king of Dublin, thus making Limerick an outpost of the Uí Ímair. The second theory is that Colla was a son of the Bárid mac Oitir who fought Ragnall ua Ímair in a naval engagement off the Isle of Man in 914, who in turn may have been the son of the Otir who fought alongside Ragnall ua Ímair at the Battle of Corbridge in 918. According to Downham the latter explanation is considered more likely due to the chronology and the political situation in Ireland at the time.

== Notes ==
Colla mac Báirid House of Ivar (possibly)
Regnal titles
Preceded by Tomrair mac Ailchi	King of Limerick ?–932	Succeeded by Olaf Cenncairech
