= Bárid mac Oitir =

Bárid mac Oitir (Old Norse: Bárðr Óttarsson, died 914) was a Viking (Note: The definition as given by Downham is used here – Vikings were "people of Scandinavian culture who were active outside of Scandinavia".) leader who may have ruled the Isle of Man in the early 10th century.

== Biography ==
Bárid mac Oitir is mentioned once in contemporary Irish annals. The Annals of Ulster in 914 record:

A naval battle off the Isle of Man between Bárid son of Oitir and Ragnall grandson of Ímar, in which Bárid and nearly all of his army were destroyed.

His father could have been Ottir mac Iargni who is recorded in the Annals of Ulster killing a son of Auisle in alliance with Muirgel daughter of Máel Sechnaill mac Máele Ruanaid in 883, and/or jarl Ottir, who died at the Battle of Corbridge. (These figures may have represented the same person, although this is far from certain.)

Bárid mac Oitir may have been the father of Colla mac Báirid, king of Limerick during the early 10th century.
