= Donnchad Ua Briain =

Bishop of Limerick

Styles of Donnchad Ua Briain
- Reference style: The Right Reverend
- Spoken style: My Lord
- Religious style: Bishop

Donnchad Ua Briain was Bishop of Limerick in the late 12th and early 13th centuries.

A relative of the Limerick Royal Family, he died in 1207.
