= Amlaíb Cenncairech =

King of Limerick
- Reign: 932/3–937
- Predecessor: Colla
- Successor: Aralt

Amlaíb Cenncairech was a Norse ruler and presumably King of Limerick notable for his military activities in Ireland in the 930s, especially in the province of Connacht and apparently even in Ulster and Leinster. This period, the 920s and 930s, is commonly regarded as the very height of Norse power in Ireland, and was when Limerick essentially equalled Dublin in power.

His epithet Cennc(h)airech is commonly translated into the unflattering "Scabby-Head" but this may be inaccurate. The adjective cairech actually means, according to the Dictionary of the Irish Language, "criminal; guilty; sinful", and thus Cennc(h)airech may be translated "Sinful Head".

== Career ==
Amlaíb is mentioned by name only in the Annals of the Four Masters and Annals of Clonmacnoise. Historians believe the dating in both cases is off. In general, the sources for western Ireland's history are not great. The Chronicon Scotorum records several of the same and related events but does not mention Amlaíb by name.

=== Annals of the Four Masters ===
The Annals of the Four Masters are generally off by two years.

AFM931.15[933]: The victory of Duibhthir was gained by Amhlaeibh Ceanncairech of Luimneach, where some of the nobles of Ui-Maine were slain.

AFM932.2[934]: The foreigners of Luimneach plundered Connaught as far as Magh-Luirg to the north, and as far as Badhbhghna to the east.

AFM934.6[936]: Amhlaibh Ceannchairech, with the foreigners, came from Loch Eirne across Breifne to Loch Ribh. On the night of Great Christmas they reached the Sinainn, and they remained seven months there; and Magh-Aei was spoiled and plundered by them.

==== Capture or recruitment? ====
AFM935.16[937]: Amhlaeibh, son of Godfrey, lord of the foreigners, came at Lughnasadh from Ath-cliath, and carried off as prisoners Amhlaeibh Ceanncairech from Loch Ribh, and the foreigners who were with him (i.e. with Cairech), after breaking their ships.

AFM935.17[937]: The foreigners of Athcliath left their fortress, and went to England.

The traditional interpretation of these notices, the second immediately following the first in the manuscripts, is that what Amlaíb mac Gofraid was actually doing was compelling or recruiting Amlaíb Cenncairech for his upcoming battle with Athelstan of England. This was the Battle of Brunanburh.

More recent historians tend to interpret this as the culmination of an extended conflict between the Norse of Dublin and Limerick, dating from the arrival of Tomrair mac Ailchi in 922. They assume that the two Amlaíbs actually engaged in a battle and that mac Gofraid won a "decisive victory" over Cenncairech, effectively ending Limerick as a major player in Ireland for the next two or three decades.

=== Annals of Clonmacnoise ===
It is uncertain but likely that Cenncairech soon succeeded Colla ua Bairid, who died in 932, as King of the Limerick Norse, and thus it is likely he was involved in the events of 933.

AC928[933]: The Danes of Loghernie preyed and spoyled all Ireland, both temporall and spirituall land without respight of person, age, or sex, until they came to Loghgawney.

AC929[934]: The Danes of Lymbrick preyed & spoyled all Connought to Moylerge of the North to Bowgna of the East.

AC930[936]: The Danes of Logherney arrived at Loghrie on Christmas night, Awley Keanchyreagh, and there remained seven months preying and spoiling the borders of Connought called Moyenoye.

Again the expedition to England follows, but here no mention is made of any conflict with Dublin.

AC931[937]: The Danes of Loghrie, arrived at Dublin. Awley [mac Gofraid] with all the Danes of Dublin and north part of Ireland departed and went overseas. The Danes that departed from Dublin arrived in England, & by the help of the Danes of that kingdom, they gave battle to the Saxons on the plaines of othlyn, where there was a great slaughter of Normans and Danes, among which they ensueing captaines were slaine, viz. Sithfrey and Oísle y 2 sones of Sithrick, Galey, Awley ffroit, and...

=== Chronicon Scotorum ===
Again here no mention is made of any conflict with Dublin.

CS932: Colla grandson of Bairid, king of Luimnech, dies.

CS933: The foreigners went on Loch Érne and devastated many peoples and churches as far as Loch Gamna.

CS934: The foreigners of Luimnech raided Connacht as far north as Magh Luirg and as far east as Badhgna.

CS936: The foreigners of Loch Érne went onto Loch Ríbh.

CS937: The foreigners of Loch Ríbh went to Áth Cliath.

== Irish saga ==
A certain Amlaíb of Limerick features as a character in the 12th century saga and propaganda tract Caithréim Chellacháin Chaisil, who is killed by Cellachán Caisil himself. Alexander Bugge takes no position regarding his historicity, but offers Amlaíb Cenncairech as his primary example of an historical Amlaíb associated with Limerick. Donnchadh Ó Corráin allows that "The Amlaíb of the text may be a vague memory of Amlaíb Cennchairech but it must be remembered that Amlaíb is one of the commonest Viking names in Ireland."

Bugge does believe that this Amlaíb of Limerick can be identified as the father of the Amlaíb mac Amlaíb mentioned in the Cogad Gáedel re Gallaib as an ally of Ivar of Limerick. According to this saga and propaganda tract (dated near contemporary with the Caithréim Chellacháin Chaisil), Amlaíb mac Amlaíb was banished along with Ivar following the Norse loss at the Battle of Sulcoit against the Dál gCais led by Mathgamain mac Cennétig in 967. The two are said to have "attempted the conquest of Britain" together, apparently without success, as Amlaíb "was killed by the king of Britain" and Ivar soon after reestablished himself in Limerick.

== See also ==
- Donnubán mac Cathail, possible Irish grandson of Amlaíb

== Notes ==
Regnal titles
Preceded by Colla	King of Limerick; 932/3–937	Succeeded by Aralt
