= Kingdom of Limerick =

Kingdom of Limerick may refer to:

- the Norse kingdom, of the 10th century
- the Gaelic kingdom, of the 12th–16th centuries, better known as Thomond
