= Harald Sigtryggsson =

King of Limerick
- Reign: 937–940
- Predecessor: Olaf Scabby-head
- Successor: Ivar of Limerick
- Died: 940; Connacht
- Issue: Gofraid mac Arailt; Maccus mac Arailt
- Dynasty: Uí Ímair
- Father: Sitric Cáech

Harald Sigtryggsson (Old Irish: Aralt mac Sitric; Old Norse: Haraldr Sigtryggsson [ˈhɑrˌɑldz̠ ˈsiɣˌtryɡːsˌson], died 940) was a Viking (Note: The definition as given by Downham is used here – Vikings were "people of Scandinavian culture who were active outside of Scandinavia".) leader who ruled Limerick in the early 10th century. He was the son of Sitric Cáech and great-grandson of Ímar, making him one of the Uí Ímair. He was installed as king of Limerick following the capture of the previous king Olaf Scabby-head by Harald's cousin Olaf Guthfrithson, king of Dublin, during a battle at Lough Ree in 937. Harald died in 940 and was ultimately succeeded by Ivar of Limerick.

== Background ==
The main historical sources for this period are the Norse sagas and the Irish annals. Some of the annals, such as the Annals of Ulster, are believed to be contemporary accounts, whereas the sagas were written down at dates much later than the events they describe and are considered far less reliable. A few of the annals such as the Fragmentary Annals of Ireland and the Annals of the Four Masters were also complied at later dates, in part from more contemporary material and in part from fragments of sagas. According to Downham: "apart from these additions [of saga fragments], Irish chronicles are considered by scholars to be largely accurate records, albeit partisan in their presentation of events".

== Biography ==
In the mid-930s Olaf Scabby-head was king of Limerick and Olaf Guthfrithson was king of Dublin. At that time Olaf Scabby-head had recently led successful raids throughout Ireland and Olaf Guthfrithson required similar successes to impose his own authority. He achieved this by raiding the royal centres of Lagore and Knowth in Brega in 935. He followed this up the following year by sacking the monastery at Clonmacnoise near Limerick, but this incursion into Limerick's zone of influence brought the two Viking kings into conflict. The decisive battle came in 937 when the Limerick fleet was crushed on Lough Ree and Olaf Scabby-head was taken prisoner. This victory meant that all the Norse settlements in Ireland were now under Olaf Guthfrithson's control, and he installed his cousin Harald Sigtryggsson as king in Limerick.

Harald was killed in 940 by the Caenraighi of Aidhne. According to Lenihan this group was "a sept seated in the Barony of Kiltartan, county of Galway". The Annals of the Four Masters say the following:

Aralt ua Ímar, i.e. the son of Sitric, lord of the foreigners of Luimneach, was killed in Connacht by the Caenraighi of Aidhne. (Note: Luimneach is the Irish name for Limerick. The appelation ua Ímair is used in the chronicles to refer to grandsons and great-grandsons of Ímar.)

Comparable accounts are given in the Annals of Clonmacnoise, the Annals of Inisfallen, and the Chronicon Scotorum. His immediate successor as king of Limerick is not known, but the Annals of Inisfallen record that by 969 Limerick was ruled by Ivar.

== Family ==
Harald has been identified by scholars as a son of Sitric Cáech, king of Dublin and Viking Northumbria, and brother to Amlaíb Cuarán, who also ruled Dublin and Northumbria. The Annals of Clonmacnoise mention two more sons of Sitric, Auisle and Sichfrith, falling at the Battle of Brunanburh in 937. Gofraid (d. 954) may have been another brother though his father his only named as "Sitric" so it is not possible to say conclusively whether he and Harald were siblings. According to the Orkneyinga saga, a daughter of Sitric named Gytha was married to Olaf Tryggvason, King of Norway, but Hudson suggests this is unlikely to be correct since the marriage is said to have occurred sixty-three years after Sitric's death. It is much more likely that Gytha was actually a granddaughter of Sitric through his son Amlaíb Cuarán. Sitric married an unnamed sister of Æthelstan, King of the Anglo-Saxons in 926 before dying in 927. It is not known if any of Sitric's children were by her, but traditions first recorded at Bury in the early twelfth century identify her as Saint Edith of Polesworth. The truth of his identification is debated but regardless, Sihric's wife likely entered a nunnery in widowhood.

Two individuals, Maccus mac Arailt and Gofraid mac Arailt, who were active throughout the Irish Sea region in the 970s and 980s and ruled as kings of the Isles may have been sons of Harald. An alternative theory, put forward by Hudson, suggests that Harald was not the father of Maccus and Gofraid, rather that their father was instead a man known as Harold of Bayeux. The identification of Harald Sigtryggsson as the father of Maccus and Gofraid has been widely accepted since the seventeenth century and according to Downham "the paternity of Maccus and Guðrøðr [Gofraid] cannot be proved. However the weight of evidence points to their connection with Ireland". In his review, Woolf adds that Hudson's new theory 'lacks plausibility'.

=== Family tree ===
Family tree of the Uí Ímair

Ímar
Bárid	Sichfrith	Sitriuc	Unknown (Note: The parentage of Ímar's grandsons is unknown)
Uathmarán	Sitric Cáech	Ímar	Ragnall	Amlaíb	Gofraid
Sichfrith	Aralt	Sichfrith	Auisle	Gofraid	Amlaíb Cuarán	Mac Ragnaill	Ragnall	Blácaire	Amlaíb	Albann
Gofraid	Maccus	Ragnall	Glúniarran	Sitric Silkbeard	Aralt	Dubgall	Máel Muire	Ímar	Cammán	Gofraid

== Notes ==
Harald Sigtryggsson House of Ivar
Regnal titles
Preceded by Olaf Scabby-head	King of Limerick; 937–940	Unknown Title next held by Ivar of Limerick
