= Eadwulf of Northumbria =

Eadwulf of Northumbria may refer to:

- Eadwulf I of Northumbria (d. 717)
- Eadwulf II of Northumbria (d. 913), better known as Eadwulf I of Bamburgh
