= Ealdred I of Bamburgh =

9/10th-century ruler of Bernicia

Ealdred (died c. 933) was a ruler of Bamburgh, at least part of the former kingdom of Bernicia in northern Northumbria, in the early tenth century. He was the son of Eadwulf.

== Background ==
Ealdred's father, Eadwulf, called "king of the Saxons of the North" by the Annals of Ulster, but only actor (possibly representing 'reeve') of Bamburgh by the chronicler Æthelweard, died in 913. Eadwulf may have also been ruler of all of Northumbria following Eowils and Halfdan who were killed at Tettenhall circa 910. The twelfth-century tract De Northumbria post Britannos describes Ealdred's father Eadwulf as the grandson of Ælla of Northumbria (d. 867), via a daughter of the latter, Æthelthryth (it does not name Eadwulf's father).

== Life ==
Upon his father's death in 913, Ealdred succeeded him. The Historia de Sancto Cuthberto states that Ealdred "was a friend of King Edward the Elder, as his father had been a favourite of King Alfred the Great". Seemingly in the 910s, according to the same source, Ealdred was driven from at least some of his lands by Ragnall ua Ímair.

The Historia states that Ealdred sought refuge with Constantín mac Áeda, the king of Scotland, and that the two fought Ragnall at the Battle of Corbridge, dated by the Annals of Ulster and the Chronicle of the Kings of Alba to 918. The battle appears to have been indecisive and Ragnall remained the master of southern Northumbria, former Deira. However, if Ealdred was indeed "driven from his lands" then his regaining control of northern Northumbria was a decided benefit resulting from the battle.

According to Manuscript A of the Anglo-Saxon Chronicle, at a meeting in Bakewell in 920 northern rulers including Ealdred submitted to Edward the Elder, but this interpretation has been challenged by historians including Michael Davidson, who see it as a meeting of equals. On 12 July 927 Ealdred was one of the northern rulers who submitted to Edward's son King Æthelstan at Eamont Bridge. Ealdred's submission added Northumbria to Æthelstan's kingdom and is generally seen as the date of the foundation of the Kingdom of England.

== Death ==
Ealdred was a witness to several of Æthelstan's charters issued in southern England in 931 or 932. Benjamin Hudson states that he was not recorded thereafter, and probably died in 933, but the Annals of Clonmacnoise record in 934 that "Adulf m'Etulfe king of the North Saxons died", and Alex Woolf suggests that this may be the only notice of Ealdred's death.

== Family ==
Ealdred may have been Eadwulf's oldest son and the one who succeeded his father upon his death in 913. Historian Benjamin Hudson speculated that Ealdred was "probably the father of Oswulf I of Bamburgh, who later ruled over southern Northumbria under King Eadred (d. 955)." However, according to a twelfth-century pedigree, a genealogy in the text De Northumbria post Britannos recording the ancestry of Waltheof Earl of Northampton (and, briefly, Northumbria), Oswulf's father was Eadwulf I Bamburgh. This would make Ealdred and Oswulf brothers, rather than father and son; the other siblings being Uhtred and Adulf mcEtulfe.

== Sources ==
- Davidson, Michael (2001). "The (Non) Submission of the Northern Kings". In Higham, N. J.; Hill, D. H. (eds.). Edward the Elder, 899–924. Abingdon, Oxfordshire: Routledge. pp. 200–211. ISBN 978-0-415-21497-1.
- Hudson, Benjamin T. (2004). "Ealdred (d. 933?), leader of the Northumbrians". Oxford Dictionary of National Biography. Oxford University Press. doi:10.1093/ref:odnb/39225.(subscription, Wikipedia Library access or UK public library membership required)
- McGuigan, Neil (2015). "Ælla and the descendants of Ivar: politics and legend in the Viking Age". Northern History. 52 (1): 20–34. doi:10.1179/0078172X14Z.00000000075. S2CID 161252048.
- Stenton, Sir Frank M., Anglo-Saxon England Third Edition. Oxford University Press, 1971.
- Whitelock, Dorothy, ed. (1979). English Historical Documents, Volume 1, c. 500–1042 (2nd ed.). London, UK: Routledge. ISBN 978-0-415-14366-0.
- Woolf, Alex (2007). From Pictland to Alba: 789–1070. Edinburgh University Press. ISBN 978-0-7486-1233-8.

Regnal titles
Preceded by Eadwulf I of Bamburgh	Ruler of Bamburgh; 913-c. 933	Succeeded by Æthelstan as King of the English
