= Uhtred (Derbyshire ealdorman) =

Derbyshire-area Anglo-Saxon ealdorman

- Ealdorman in Derbyshire (perhaps in the Five Boroughs of the Danelaw)
- Reign: fl. x 911–926, 930–50?, 955–58?
- Predecessor: unclear
- Successor: unclear
- Died: unclear
- Issue: unclear
- Father: Eadwulf II of Northumbria
- Mother: unknown

Uhtred (fl. x 911–926, 930–50, and perhaps 955–58) was an ealdorman based in Derbyshire in the 10th century. His date of birth and origins are unclear, although it has been suggested by some modern historians that he came from Northumbria. He is thought to have been the thegn who, having purchased land at Hope and Ashford in Derbyshire from the Vikings before 911, had it confirmed by King Æthelstan in 926. He was ealdorman in or before 930. It appears that he witnessed charters during the remainder of the reign of Æthelstan, the reign of Edmund I (939–46) and the reign of Eadred (946–55), and the last king appears to have granted Uhtred land at Bakewell in 949. It is thought that Uhtred may have used this land to found a minster there. An Uhtred witnesses charters from 955 to 958, in the reigns of Eadwig the Fair (955–59) and Edgar the Peaceable (957–75), but some historians believe this to be a different Uhtred, perhaps Uhtred Cild.

== Thegn ==
A charter dated to 926, preserved in the archives of Burton Abbey, has King Æthelstan confirm 60 hides (manentes) of land at Hope and Ashford in Derbyshire to his "faithful man", Uhtred. Uhtred is said to have purchased the land from the Scandinavians for twenty pounds of silver and gold, having been ordered to do so by Æthelstan's father and predecessor Edward the Elder and by Æthelred, Lord of the Mercians. As Æthelred was inactive for some time before his death in 911, the purchase probably occurred in the first decade of the tenth century.

W. H. Stevenson in 1895 argued that this Uhtred was a member of the Bamburgh family, perhaps a son of Eadwulf II of Northumbria. Peter Sawyer added his support for Stevenson's northern origin theory in 1975, noting the Anglo-Saxon Chronicle version A (the "Parker Chronicle")'s claim that the "sons of Eadwulf", along with other northern potentates, submitted to Edward the Elder at Bakewell, Derbyshire, in 920. Sawyer further speculated on the course of events: the Bamburgh family acknowledged West Saxon supremacy c. 900, and the West Saxon king ordered them to buy up land in the Peak District; the area remained outside direct West Saxon control until 917, when the Scandinavians lost control of Derby; in 920, on the death of Æthelflæd, Lady of the Mercians, Edward became King of Mercia, soon after constructing a burh at Bakewell, on Uhtred's land Edward; Æthelstan succeeded Edward in 924, and confirmed Uhtred's lands in 926.

== Ealdorman, 930–40 ==
From 930, a notable named Uhtred begins attesting royal charters as an ealdorman (in Latin, dux). Cyril Hart and Peter Sawyer believed that the thegn of the 926 confirmation was the same man as this new ealdorman. This man occurs as the fourth ealdorman in the list of secular witness to a charter of King Æthelstan to Beornheah, bishop of Selsey, dated 3 April 930 and issued at Lyminster in Sussex; then fifth in a grant by the king to Eadulf bishop of Crediton, at Chippenham in Wiltshire, nearly a month later on 29 April.

The following year, on 23 March 931 at Colchester he is probably named as the fourth ealdorman on a list of witnesses; probably fifth on 20 June at Worthy in Hampshire, and fourth on 12 November at Lifton in Devon. He witnesses a further three extant charters of 932, on 30 August at Milton in either Kent or Dorset (fifth ealdorman), on 9 November at Exeter in Devon (seventh ealdorman), and on Christmas Eve at Amesbury in Wiltshire (as fourth ealdorman). Two subscriptions occur in 933, on 11 January (fifth ealdorman) and 26 January (fourth), respectively at Wilton and Chippenham, both in Wiltshire; two in 934, at Winchester and Nottingham on 28 May (eighth) and 7 June (fifth); and one in 935, on 21 December (fourth) at Dorchester. Simon Keynes' Atlas of Attestations lists this Uhtred as witness to nine more charters during Æthelstan's reign, three in 937, two in 938, and four in 939; he is the second ealdorman in all cases for the years 937 and 938, and in 939 he occurs fourth three times and fifth once.

A problem is that from 931 to 935, two ealdormen with the name Uhtred witness royal charters. The charters labelled Sawyer numbers 412, 413, 416, 417, 418, 407, and 434 are all subscribed by two Uhtreds. Historian Cyril Hart argued in 1975 that this second Uhtred was an ealdorman in Essex, but by 1987 thought his jurisdiction fell over the shires of North-Western Mercia. Hart believed that this Uhtred's successor in North-Western Mercia was Æthelmund, ruling between 940 and 965.

== Ealdorman, 940–950 ==
After the accession of Edmund I, Uhtred continued to witness royal charters, his name coming fourth, fourth, fourth, sixth, seventh, and fifth, in six surviving witness lists from 940. There are four appearances dating to 941, where his name falls seventh for three and sixth for one; and three for 942, his name ranking sixth once and eighth twice. He is fifth and sixth once, seventh three times, and eighth once in six charters dating to 943. He appears in one charter in 944, ranked seventh, and one charter of 946, ranked eighth. He subscribes two other extant charters that cannot be dated, where he is fifth and eighth. Uhtred witnessed one more charter in 946, falling to tenth among ealdormen, this time after the accession of Eadred to the English throne.

After a gap of a few years, in 949 an Uhtred witnessed two charters, this time being placed sixth and seventh. In the same year Uhtred himself appears to be the beneficiary of a royal grant, receiving land at Bakewell from Eadred. He may have been granted this land in order to found or refound a religious house there, and the evidence indicates Bakewell became an important centre of sculpture during the century. Uhtred witnesses again in 950.

== Ealdorman, 955–59? ==
Uhtred ceases to appear in witness lists c. 950, and it is unclear if the Uhtred who witnesses from 955 is the same ealdorman. In 955 Eadred granted Chesterfield in Derbyshire to "Uhtred the Child" (Uhtred Cild), who may be the same figure as the ealdorman, or may be a kinsman. Considering that Uhtred the ealdorman was by no means a child, would have been over 60 years old (possibly in his 70's or 80's in 955), and had never before been referred to as 'the Child', it is unlikely that he was the same person as "Uhtred Cild". As Uhtred Cild later (in 959) attested a charter (S 659) as Uhtred 'dux' or Ealdorman Uhtred, it is far more likely that he was the son of Uhtred (of Hope and Ashford) and that he inherited the position of ealdorman from his father. The charter that granted Uhtred the lands of Hope and Ashford in 926 also granted it in succession to his heirs. Uhtred Cild, whose name appears as "Uhtred the Child" (Uhtredo Child) in charter S 569, was likely identified in this manner to distinguish him from his father Uhtred. Uhtred the Child being the child of Uhtred the previous ealdorman. Peter Sawyer believed that Uhtred Cild was a separate figure, and that Uhtred Cild was responsible for the subsequent attestations with the name "Uhtred" in the period 956 to 958. D. H. Hadley likewise believed that Uhtred Cild was a separate person, the previous Uhtred dying after his last attestation in 950. Cyril Hart suggested that Uhtred Cild was Uhtred's son, and that Uhtred succeeded his father as ealdorman.

During the reign of Eadred's successor Eadwig (955–59), probably in 956 (but perhaps in 959), an "Ealdorman Uhtred" witnessed the king's grant to Oscytel bishop of Dorchester (and later archbishop of York) of the minster of Southwell with its dependent lands in Nottinghamshire. He appears under King Edgar (957–75), subscribing three charters in 958.

== Dominion ==
Whether the Uhtred above is one or several people, he is strongly associated with Derbyshire, and indeed this is regarded as the key to identifying him. Cyril Hart suggested that Uhtred was ealdorman of the Five Boroughs, as ealdormen in this period were rarely confined to one shire and as Derby was one of the Five Boroughs.
