= Curfew Murders =

On 6 March 1921, the Curfew Murders took place in Limerick, Ireland. They took the lives of George Clancy, Michael O'Callaghan and Volunteer Joseph O’Donoghue.
