= Siege of Limerick =

Siege of Limerick may refer to:

- Siege of Limerick (1642), English Protestants surrendered to Confederate Catholics
- Siege of Limerick (1650–1651), Confederate Catholics and English Royalists surrendered to English Parliamentary forces
- Siege of Limerick (1690), Jacobites withstood Williamites
- Siege of Limerick (1691), Jacobites surrendered to Williamites

== See also ==
- Battle of Limerick, Irish republican Irregulars surrendered to Irish Free State forces
