= Tomrair mac Ailchi =

Tomrair mac Ailchi, or Thormod/Thorir Helgason, was the Viking jarl and prince who reestablished the preexisting small Norse base or settlement at Limerick as a powerful kingdom in 922 overnight when he is recorded arriving there with a huge fleet from an unknown place of departure. His ancestry is uncertain but he evidently did not belong to the Uí Ímair dynasty who only a few years before had reestablished themselves in the Kingdom of Dublin, of which Tomrair, the first King of Limerick, would immediately make himself the chief rival.

== Notes ==
Regnal titles
Preceded by none	King of Limerick; 922–?	Succeeded by Colla
