= Eadwulf I of Bamburgh =

Ruler in Northumbria in the early tenth century

Eadwulf I

Ruler of Bamburgh
- Preceded by: Uncertain, perhaps Ecgberht II
- Succeeded by: Ealdred I of Bamburgh

Personal details
- Died: 913
- Children: Ealdred (died after 927); Uhtred of Bamburgh (died c. 950) (Note: (not to be confused with another Uthred - Uthred the Bold who died ca.1016)); Adulf mcEtulfe (Æthelwulf), King of the Northern Saxons; died 934.; Oswulf I of Bamburgh, High-Reeve of Bamburgh; died between 954 and 963.
- Occupation: Ruler

Eadwulf I (died 913) was ruler of Bamburgh in the early tenth century. A genealogy in the twelfth-century text De Northumbria post Britannos recording the ancestry of Waltheof Earl of Northampton (and, briefly, Northumbria), makes Eadwulf the son of Æthelthryth daughter of Ælla, King of Northumbria, but no source names Eadwulf's own father.

One of the few things that can be said with reasonable certainty of Eadwulf is that he died in 913 in Northumbria, an event recorded by the chronicle of Æthelweard and by the Irish Annals of Ulster and Annals of Clonmacnoise. The Irish sources call him "king of the Northern English" while Æthelweard says Eadwulf "ruled as actor [possibly 'reeve'] of the town called Bamburgh". The Historia de Sancto Cuthberto states that Eadwulf had been a favourite (dilectus) of King Alfred the Great.

Historians have traditionally followed Æthelweard and portrayed Eadwulf as ruler of only the northern part of Northumbria, perhaps corresponding to the former kingdom of Bernicia, with Scandinavian or Norse-Gael kings ruling the southern part, the former kingdom of Deira, an area broadly similar to Yorkshire. Some historians have questioned this. For example, Benjamin Hudson writes that Eadwulf "might have ruled just the northern part of Northumbria, the old Kingdom of Bernicia, although it is not impossible that he ruled all of Northumbria".

Eadwulf's period in office is uncertain but may have been long. Clare Downham notes that the death of Eadwulf "is so widely reported in 913 that it seems hard to envisage that his fame derived from a three-year reign". Some interpretations make Eadwulf ruler in Bernicia after Ecgberht II, that is to say from the 870s approximately. David Rollason described Eadwulf as an earl who flourished between about 890 and 912, and ruled an area north of the River Tyne and extending into what is now southern Scotland from the old Northumbrian royal centre at Bamburgh. According to Benjamin Hudson, in 913 Eadred son of Rixinc invaded Eadwulf's territory and killed him, then seized his wife and went to the sanctuary of the lands of St Cuthbert south of the River Tyne.

The Anglo-Saxon Chronicle refers to sons of Eadwulf and two sons are recorded: Ealdred (died after 927) and Uhtred (perhaps Uhtred); both may have ruled some part of Northumbria. Another two sons are attested elsewhere: Adulf (which McGuigan suggests represents ′Æthelwulf′) is the ′King of the Northern Saxons′ whose obit was recorded in the Annals of Clonmacnoise for a year representing 934; another, Oswulf, is named in a genealogy reproduced by De Northumbria post Britannos (this is probably the later 'high reeve' Oswulf, fl. 934–954).

Although the name of his wife (or wives) is not known, Eadwulf is identified as the father of four sons:

- Ealdred, died after 927.
- Uhtred, died c.950.
- Adulf mcEtulfe (Æthelwulf), King of the Northern Saxons; died 934.
- Oswulf I of Bamburgh, High-Reeve of Bamburgh; died between 954 and 963.

== Sources ==
- Downham, Clare (2007), Viking Kings of Britain and Ireland: The Dynasty of Ívarr to A.D. 1014, Edinburgh: Dunedin, ISBN 978-1-903765-89-0
- Hall, Richard (2001), "A kingdom too far: York in the early tenth century", in Higham, N. J.; Hill, D. H. (eds.), Edward the Elder 899–924, London: Routledge, pp. 188–199, ISBN 0-415-21497-1
- Hudson, Benjamin (2005), Viking Pirates and Christian Princes: Dynasty, Religion and Empire in the North Atlantic, Oxford: Oxford University Press, ISBN 0-19-516237-4
- McGuigan, Neil (2015). "Ælla and the descendants of Ivar: politics and legend in the Viking Age". Northern History. 52 (1): 20–34. doi:10.1179/0078172X14Z.00000000075. S2CID 161252048.
- Stenton, Sir Frank M. Anglo-Saxon England Third Edition. Oxford University Press, 1971.
- Woolf, Alex (2007), From Pictland to Alba, 789–1070, The New Edinburgh History of Scotland, Edinburgh: Edinburgh University Press, ISBN 978-0-7486-1234-5

Regnal titles
Preceded by uncertain, perhaps Ecgberht II?	Ruler of Bamburgh to 913	Succeeded by Ealdred I
