= Battle of Corbridge =

Part of the Norse invasions of England

- Part of Viking invasions of England
| Date | 918 |
| Location | Corbridge, Northumberland, England 54.974092°N 2.017064°W |
| Result | Indecisive; Viking Strategic Victory; Scots army retreat; Ragnall invades Northumbria. |

Belligerents
| Kingdom of Scotland; Kingdom of Northumbria | Kingdom of the Isles |

Commanders and leaders
| King Constantine II; Ealdred I of Bamburgh | Ragnall ua Imair |

The Battle of Corbridge took place on the banks of the River Tyne near the village of Corbridge in Northumberland in the year 918.

The battle was referenced in the Annals of Ulster and the Chronicle of the Kings of Alba. The battle was fought between Norse-Gael leader Ragnall ua Ímair and his allies against the forces of Constantín mac Áeda, King of Scotland together with those of Ealdred I of Bamburgh who had previously been driven from his lands by Ragnall. The Historia de Sancto Cuthberto adds that English fought alongside Norsemen. The Annals of Ulster informs us that the Norse army divided itself into four columns, in one of which may have been Jarl Ottir Iarla, a long-time ally of Ragnall.

The Scots destroyed the first three columns, but were ambushed by the last. This unit had remained hidden behind a hill and was commanded by Ragnall. The Scots, however, managed to escape without disaster. It seems that it was an indecisive engagement, although it did allow Ragnall to further establish himself in Northumbria. In 919, Ragnall descended on York where he took the city and had himself proclaimed king. The Bernicians remained under him, although Ealdred I of Bamburgh and Domnall I, king of Strathclyde, paid homage to the king of England.

In 1950, F. T. Wainwright argued that there were two battles of Corbridge in 914 and 918, and his view was widely accepted for over fifty years, but since around 2006 historians have taken the view that there was only one battle in 918. (Note: Wainwright argued that there were two battles in his article, "The Battles at Corbridge". His view was accepted by Frank Stenton in his standard history of Anglo-Saxon England (3rd edition 1971), Alfred P. Smyth discusses the two battles at length in his 1975 and 1979 Scandinavian York and Dublin. N. J. Higham referred to the "battles of Corbridge" in his 1993 Kingdom of Northumbria, and in the 1997 Oxford Illustrated History of the Vikings, Donnchadh O Corrain stated that Ragnall won a battle at Corbridge in 914. In his 2004 Dictionary of National Biography (DNB) article on Æthelflæd, Lady of the Mercians, Marios Costambeys cites the Fragmentary Annals of Ireland as saying that she led the army opposing Ragnall at the Second Battle of Corbridge, and Cyril Hart also refers to two battles in his DNB article on Ragnall. However, Clare Downham argued in her 2003 doctoral thesis, subsequently published as a book Viking Kings of Britain and Ireland in 2007 that there was only one battle in 918. See also Alex Woolf From Pictland to Alba, published in 2007. This view is accepted by Tim Clarkson in his 2014 Strathclyde and the Anglo-Saxons in the Viking Age.)

== Other sources ==
- Seán Mac Airt; Gearóid Mac Niocaill, eds. (1983). The Annals of Ulster (to AD 1131). Translated by Mac Airt; Mac Niocaill. Dublin: Dublin Institute for Advanced Studies.
- Howorth, Henry H. (January 1911). "Ragnall Ivarson and Jarl Otir". The English Historical Review. 26 (101): 1–19. doi:10.1093/ehr/xxvi.ci.1. Also JSTOR.
- Stenton, Sir Frank M. Anglo-Saxon England Third Edition. Oxford University Press, 1971.
