= History of Limerick =

History of the city in Munster, Ireland

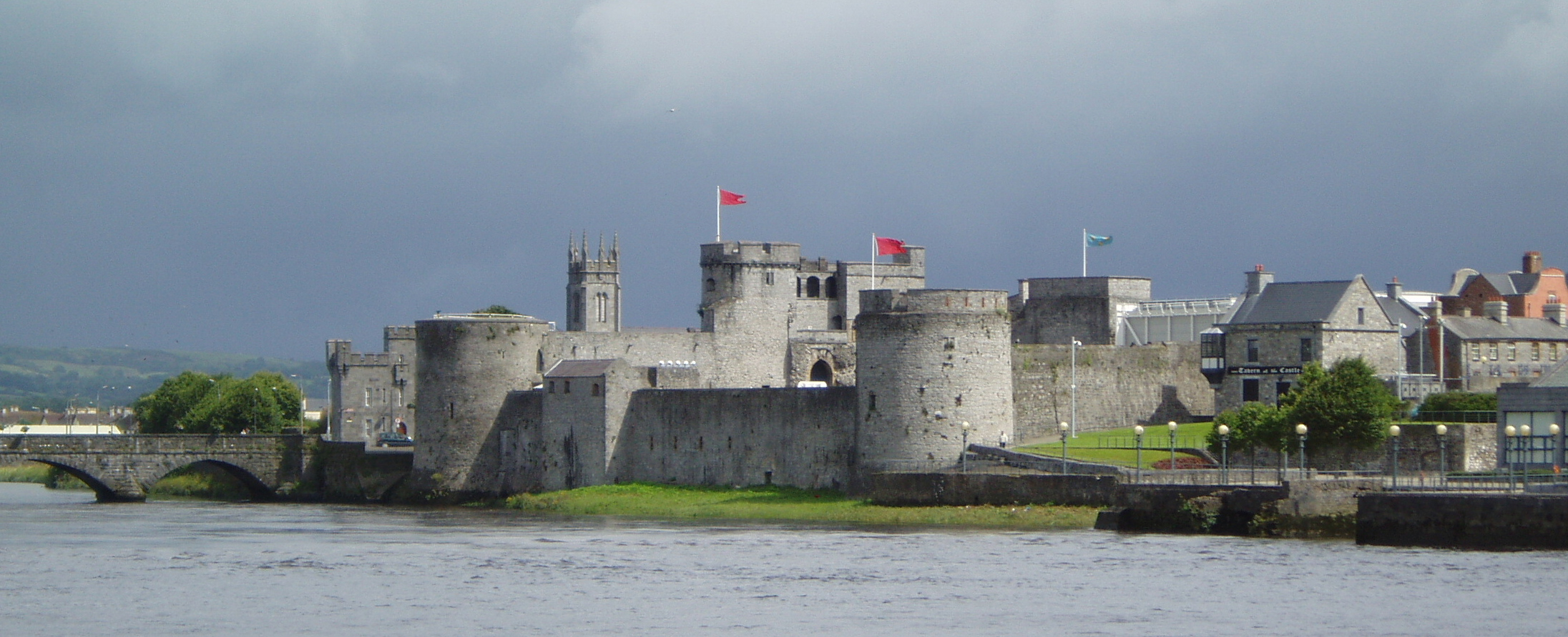
The 13th-century King John's Castle in Limerick

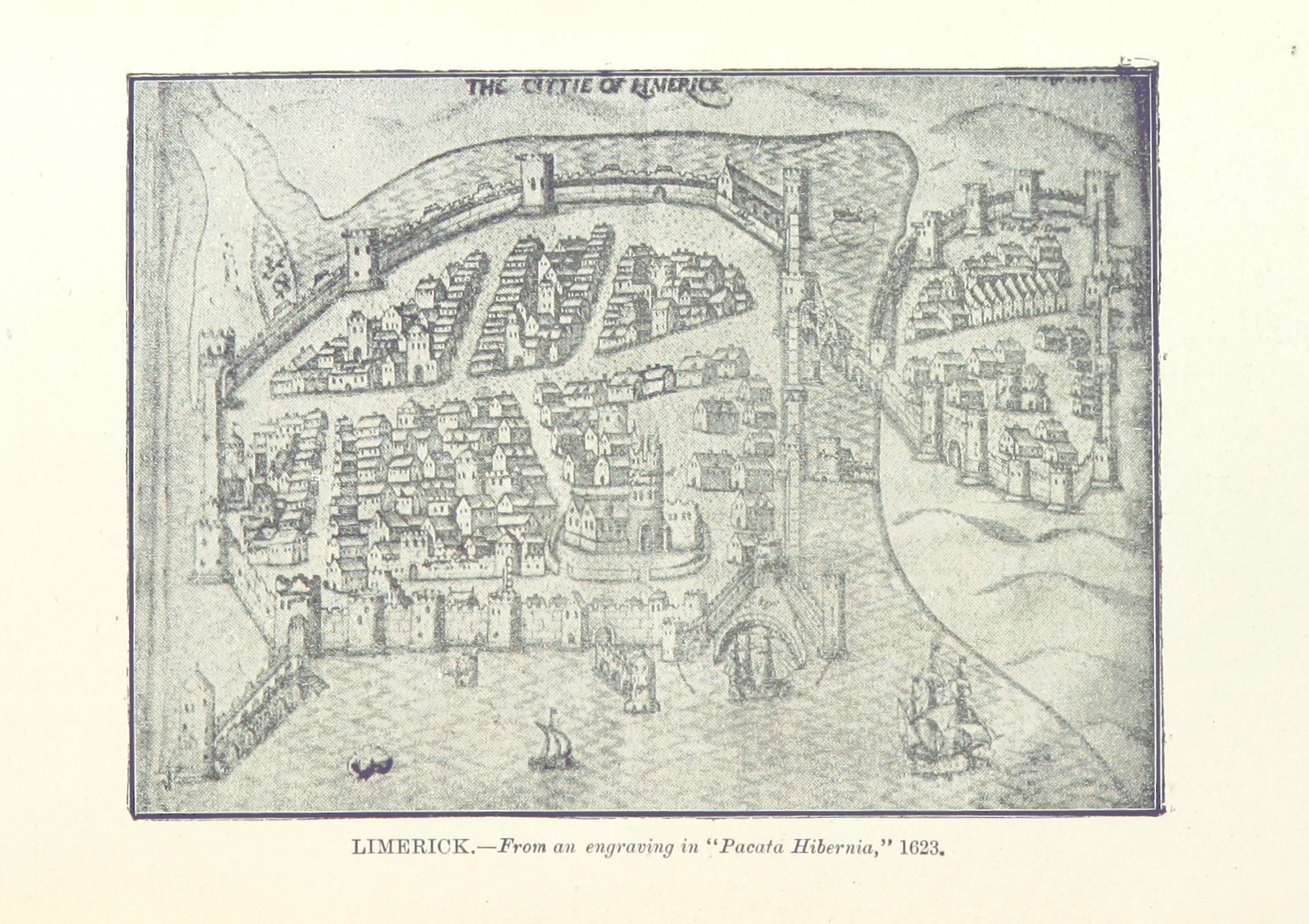
Plan of Limerick from an engraving in Pacata Hibernia (1623)

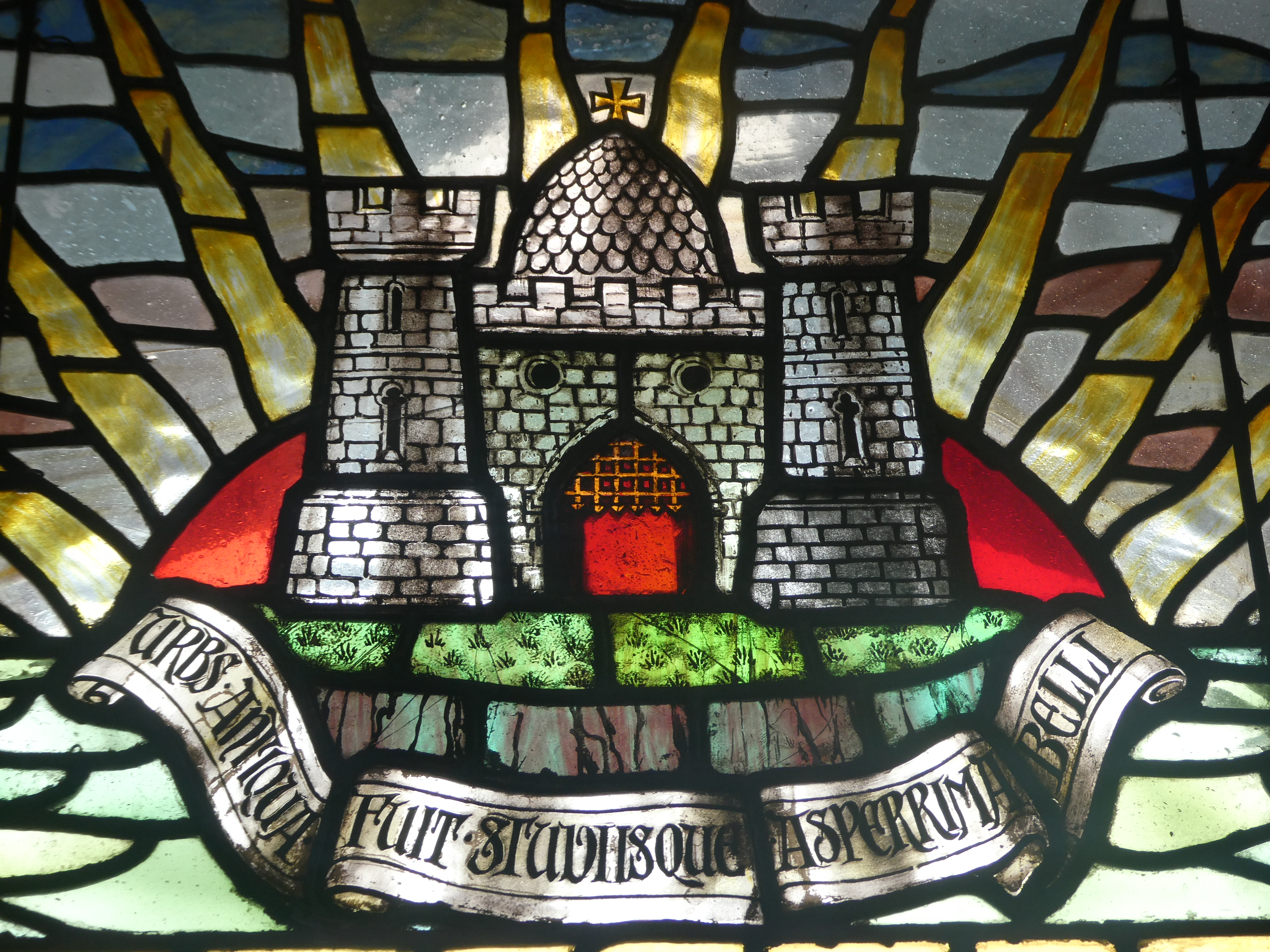
Arms and motto of Limerick, depicted in stained glass: "There was an ancient city, very fierce in the skills of war."

The history of Limerick stretches back to its establishment by Vikings as a walled city on King's Island (an island in the River Shannon) in 812, and to the granting of Limerick's city charter in 1197.

King John ordered the building (1200) of a great castle. The city was besieged three times in the 17th century, culminating in the famous 1691 Treaty of Limerick and the flight of the defeated Catholic leaders abroad. Much of the city was built during the following Georgian prosperity, which ended abruptly with the Act of Union in 1800. Today the city has a growing multicultural population.

== Name ==
Luimneach originally referred to the general area along the banks of the Shannon Estuary, which was known as Loch Luimnigh. The original pre-Viking and Viking era settlement on Kings Island was known in the annals as Inis Sibhtonn and Inis an Ghaill Duibh

The name dates from at least 561, but its original meaning is unclear. Early anglicised spellings of the name are Limnigh, Limnagh, Lumnigh and Lumnagh, which are closer to the Irish spelling. There are numerous places of the same name throughout Ireland (anglicised as Luimnagh, Lumnagh, Limnagh etc.). According to P W Joyce in The Origin and History of Irish Names of Places II, the name "signifies a bare or barren spot of land". Similarly, others have suggested that the name derives from loimeanach meaning "a bare marsh" or "a spot made bare by feeding horses". The Dindsenchas (The Metrical Dindsenchas III page 274), attempted to explain the name in a number of ways, connecting it particularly with luimnigthe ("cloaked") and luimnechda ("shielded").

== Early history ==
William Camden wrote that the Irish had been jealous about their antiquity since the deluge and were ambitious to memorialise important events for posterity. The earliest provable settlement dates from 812; however, history suggests the presence of earlier settlements in the area surrounding King's Island, the island at the historical city centre. Antiquity's map-maker, Ptolemy, produced in 150 AD the earliest map of Ireland, showing a place called "Regia" at the same site as King's Island. History also records an important battle involving Cormac mac Airt in 221 and a visit by St. Patrick in 434 to baptise an Eóganachta king, Carthann the Fair. Saint Munchin, the first bishop of Limerick died in 652, indicating the city was a place of some note. In 812 Danes sailed up the Shannon and pillaged the town, burned the monastery of Mungret but were forced to flee when the Irish attacked and killed many of their number.

== Viking origins ==
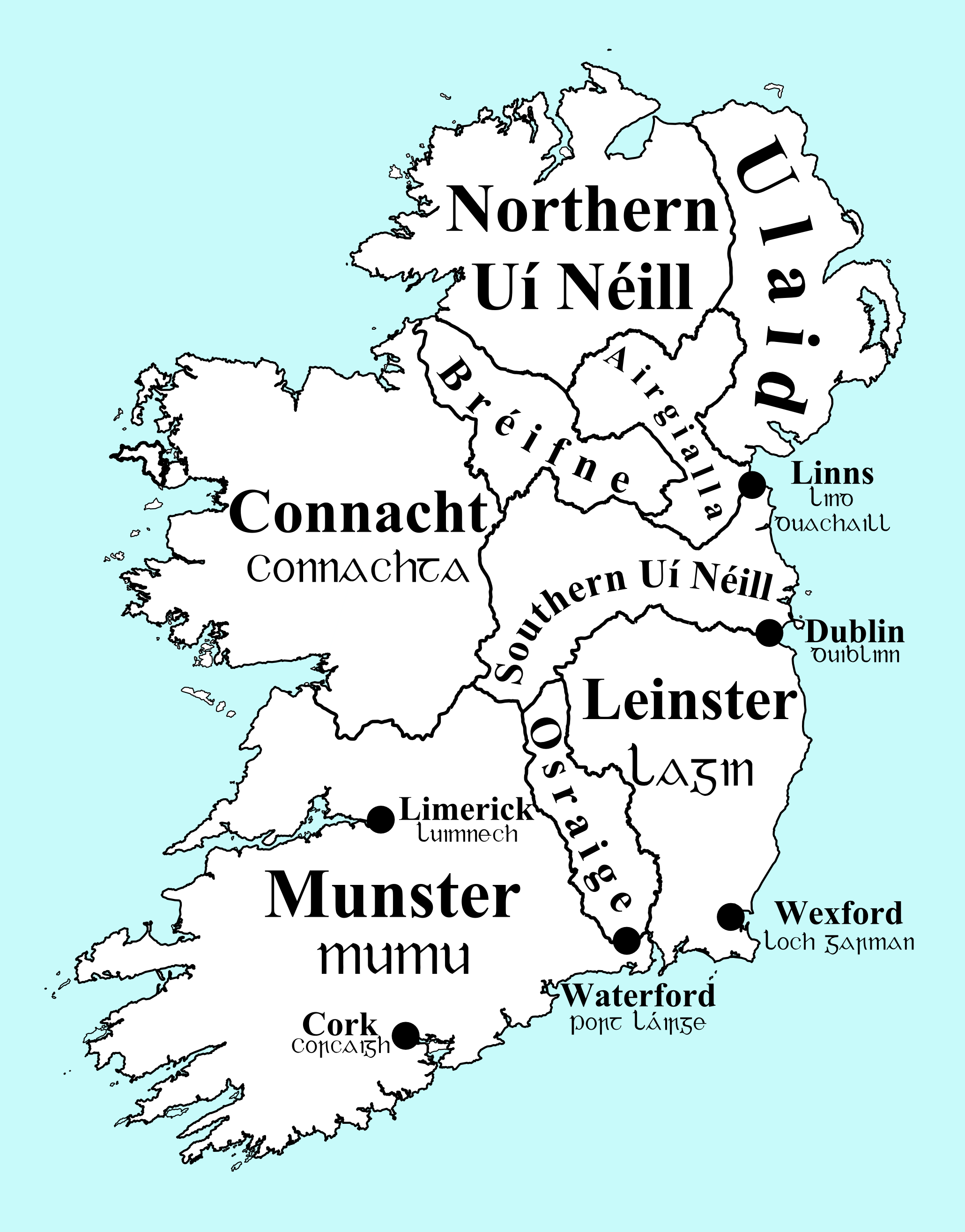
Ireland circa 900

The earliest record of Vikings at Limerick is in 845, reported by the Annals of Ulster, and there are intermittent reports of Vikings in the region later in the 9th century. Permanent settlement on the site of modern Limerick had begun by 922. In that year a Viking jarl or prince called Tomrair mac Ailchi—Thórir Helgason—led the Limerick fleet on raids along the River Shannon, from the lake of Lough Derg to the lake of Lough Ree, pillaging ecclesiastical settlements. Two years later, the Dublin Vikings led by Gofraid ua Ímair attacked Limerick, but were driven off. The war between Dublin and Limerick continued until 937 when the Dubliners, now led by Gofraid's son Amlaíb, captured Limerick's king Amlaíb Cenncairech and for some reason destroyed his fleet. However, no battle is actually recorded and so a traditional interpretation has been that Amlaíb mac Gofraid was actually recruiting Amlaíb of Limerick for his upcoming conflict with Athelstan of England, which would turn out be the famous Battle of Brunanburh. The 920s and 930s are regarded as the height of Norse power in Ireland and only Limerick rivalled Dublin during this time.

The last Norse King of Limerick was Ivar of Limerick, who features prominently as an enemy of Mathgamain mac Cennétig and later his famous brother Brian Boru in the Cogad Gáedel re Gallaib. He and his allies were defeated by the Dál gCais, and after slaying Ivar, Brian would annex Norse Limerick and begin to make it the new capital of his kingdom. The power of the Norsemen never recovered, and they were reduced to the level of a minor clan; however, they often played pivotal parts in the endless power struggles of the next few centuries.

Brian Boru's son, Donnchad (Donough), was routed by Diarmait mac Maíl na mBó, King of Leinster, in the year 1058 when Limerick was burned, a punishment he repeated five years later. A year later Diarmait defeated Donnchad again forcing him to flee overseas and installing Turlough instead. Obviously Limerick was of great importance as evidenced by being a contentious issue between neighbouring chieftains and foreigners who burned and pillaged the city. Brian Boru's sons were usually called Kings of north Munster though their reigns were rather disturbed until 1164 when Donnchad mac Briain became King of Munster. His reign was successful, founding monasteries and nunneries, constructing several monuments, including a church on the Rock of Cashel, and in his grant bestowing his Limerick Gothic palace to the church he styled himself King of Limerick. However the Danes were still a powerful force who were able to obtain four sequential Danish bishops concentrated by the Archbishop of Canterbury not subservient to the See of Cashel.

== Anglo-Norman era ==
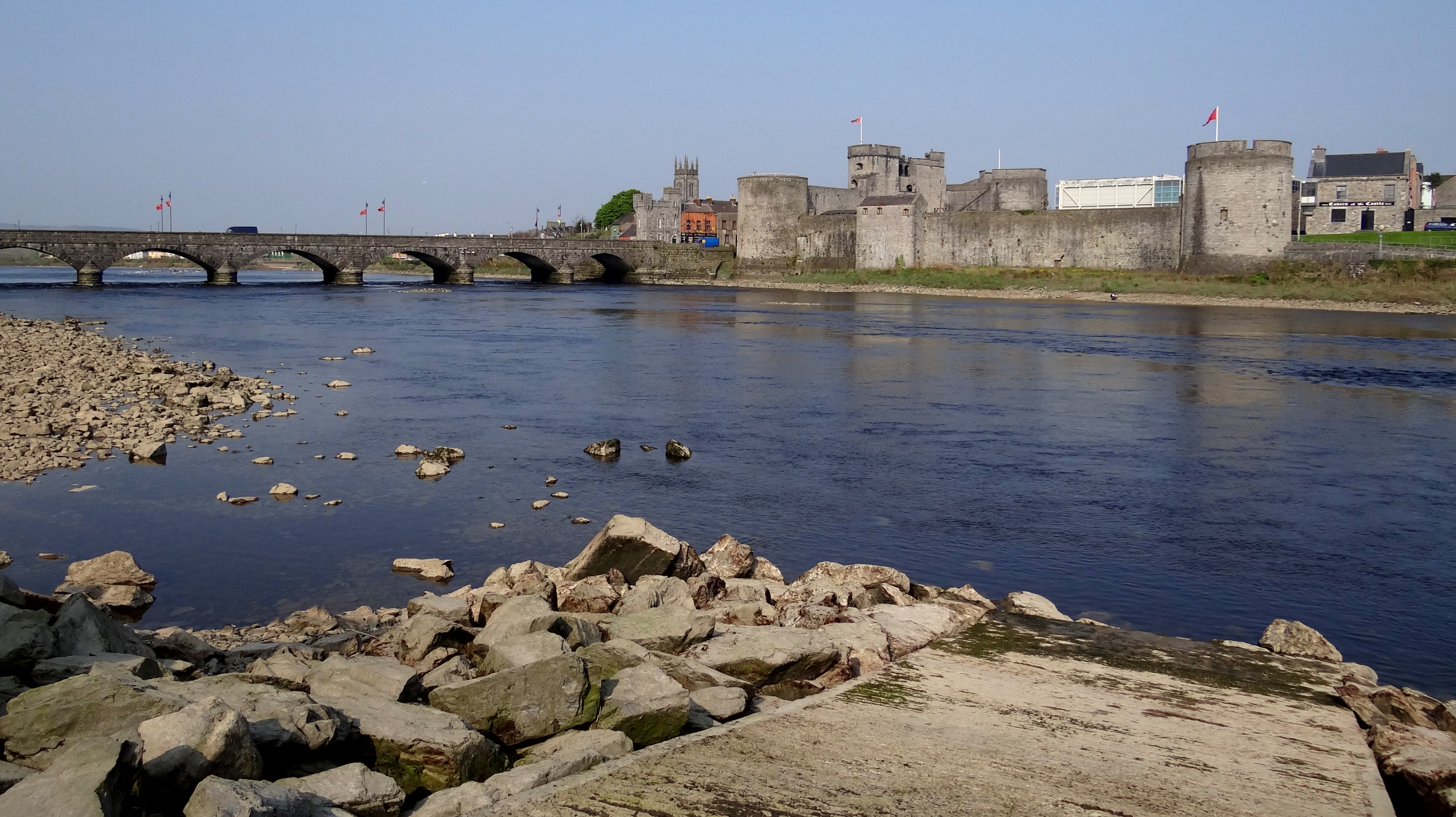
King John's Castle, built in the 13th century, lies alongside the River Shannon. Thomond Bridge (on the left of this photograph), from the 19th century, stands on the site of an earlier bridge.

The arrival of the Normans to the area in 1173 changed everything. Domnall Mór Ua Briain, the last styled King of Limerick, burned the city to the ground in 1174 in a bid to keep it from the hands of the new invaders. After he died in 1194, the Normans finally captured the area in 1195, under the leadership of Prince John. In 1197, King Richard I of England granted the city its first charter, and its first Mayor, Adam Sarvant, ten years before London. A castle, built on the orders of King John and bearing his name, was completed around 1200. Under the general peace imposed by Norman rule, Limerick prospered as a port and trading centre. By this time the city was divided into an area which became known as "English Town" on King's Island surrounded by high walls, while another settlement, named "Irish Town", where the Irish and Danes lived, had grown on the south bank of the river. In 1216 King John further granted the areas North (as far as a tributary of the Shannon) and South of the River to City to be known as the "Northern" and "Southern" Liberties. Around 1395 construction started on walls around Irishtown that were not completed until the end of the 15th century.

The city opened a mint in 1467. A 1574 document prepared for the Spanish ambassador attests to its wealth:

Limerick is stronger and more beautiful than all the other cities of Ireland, well walled with stout walls of hewn marble...there is no entrance except by stone bridges, one of the two of which has 14 arches, and the other eight ... for the most part the houses are of square stone of black marble and built in the form of towers and fortresses.

Luke Gernon, an English-born judge and resident of Limerick, wrote a similar description in 1620:

Lofty building of marble; in the High Street it is built from one gate to the other in a single form, like the Colleges in Oxford, so magnificent that at my first entrance it did amaze me.

In the 15th and 16th centuries, Limerick became a city-state isolated from the principal area of effective English rule, the Pale. Nevertheless, the Crown remained in control throughout the succeeding centuries. During the Reformation tensions arose between those loyal to the Catholic Church and those loyal to the newly established state religion — the Church of Ireland.

== Siege and treaty ==
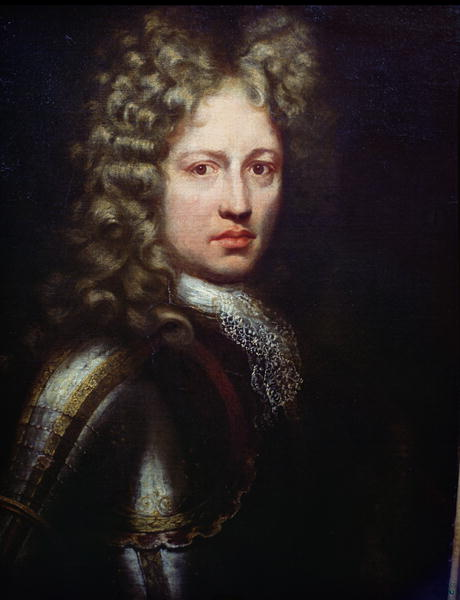
Patrick Sarsfield, 1st Earl of Lucan

Limerick was besieged several times in the 17th century. The first was in 1642, when the Irish Confederates took the King John's Castle from its English garrison. The city was besieged by Oliver Cromwell's army under Henry Ireton in 1651. The city had supported Confederate Ireland since 1642 and was garrisoned by troops from Ulster. The Confederates supported the claims of Charles II to the English throne, and the besiegers fought for a parliamentary republic. Famine and plague led to the death of 5,000 residents before heavy bombardment of Irishtown led to breach and surrender in late October of that year.

In the Williamite war in Ireland, following the Battle of the Boyne in 1690, French and Irish forces (numbering 14,000) regrouped in behind Limerick's walls. Time and war had led to a terrible decay of the once proud fortifications. The occupying armies are recorded as claiming that the walls could be knocked down with rotten apples. The Williamite besiegers, while numbering 20,000, were hampered by the loss of their heavier guns to an attack by Patrick Sarsfield. In fierce fighting, the walls were breached on three occasions, but the defenders prevailed. Eventually, the Williamites withdrew to Waterford.

William's forces returned in August 1691. Limerick was now the last stronghold of the Catholic Jacobites, under the command of Sarsfield. The promised French reinforcement failed to arrive from the sea, and following the massacre of 850 defenders on Thomond Bridge, the city sued for peace. On 3 October 1691 the famous Treaty of Limerick was signed using a large stone set in the bridge as a table. The treaty allowed the Jacobites to leave under full military honours and sail to France. Two days later French reinforcements finally arrived. Sarsfield was urged to continue the fight but refused, insisting on abiding by the terms of the treaty. Sarsfield sailed to France with 19,000 troops and formed the Irish Brigade (see also the Flight of the Wild Geese). From 1693 the Papacy supported James II again, and so the treaty was repudiated by the Williamites, for which the city became known as The City of the Violated Treaty and is a point of bitterness in the city to this day.

== Georgian Limerick and Newtown Pery ==
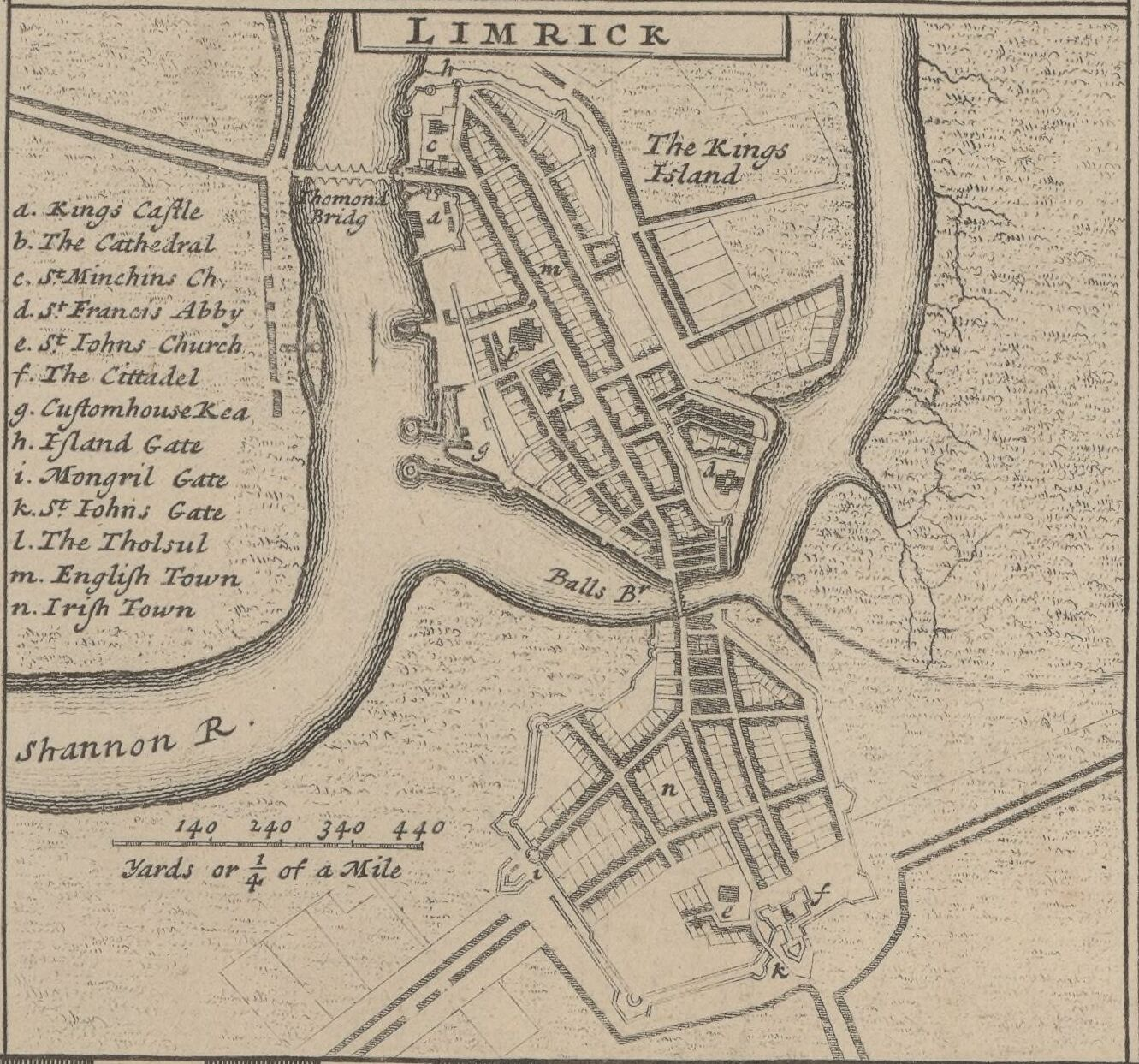
Herman Moll's map of Limerick c. 1714

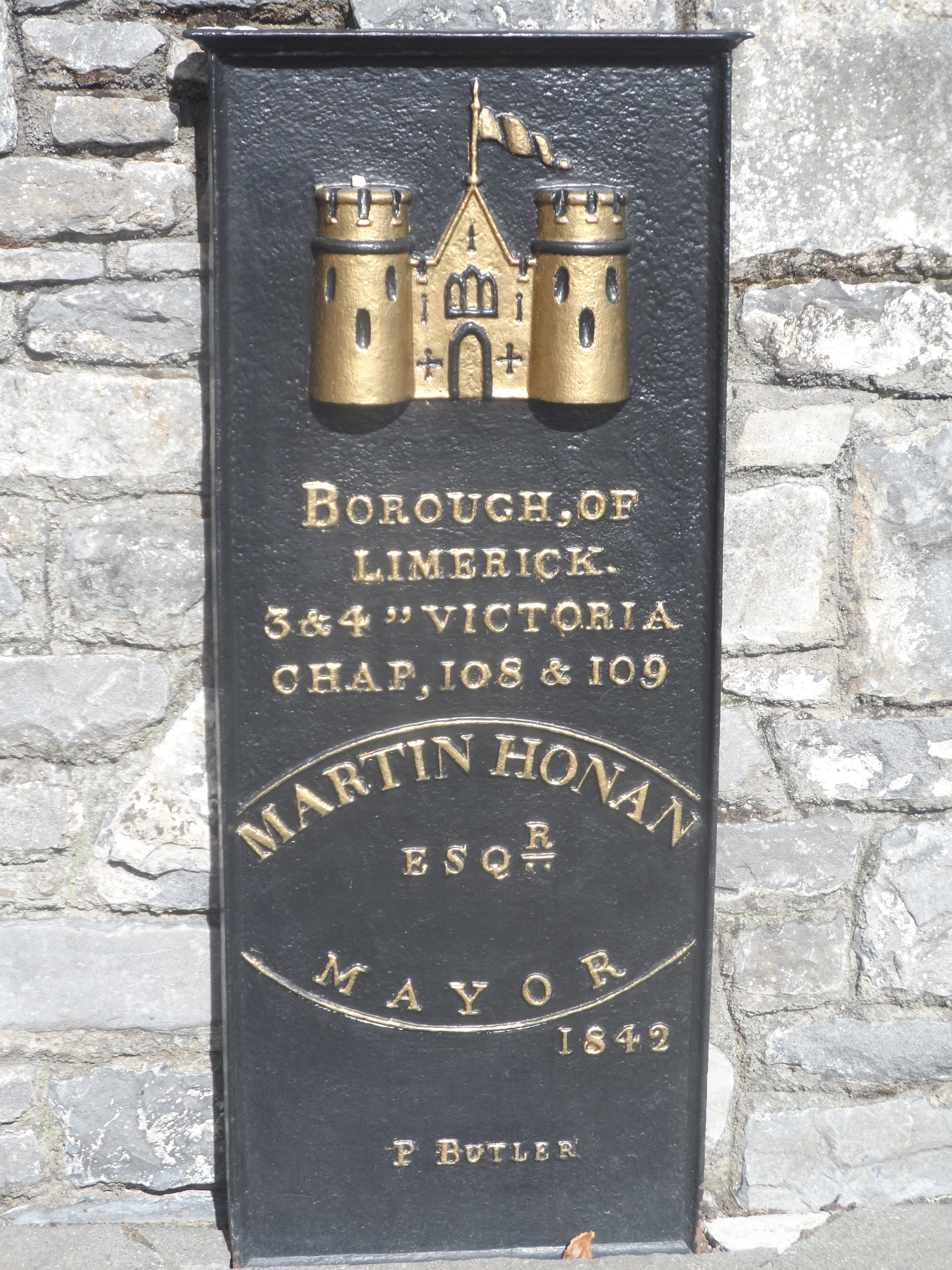
Borough boundary marker, erected 1842

While in 1695 the repressive penal laws were introduced that banned Catholics from public office, buying freehold land, voting or practising their religion in public, Limerick's position as the main port on the western side of Ireland meant that the city, and the Protestant upper class and the Catholic merchant class, began to prosper. The British version of mercantilism required a great deal of trans-Atlantic trade, and Limerick profited somewhat by this. Many significant public buildings and infrastructure projects were paid for with local trade taxes. The first infirmary was founded by the surgeon Sylvester O'Halloran in 1761. The House of Industry was built on northern bank of the river in 1774, in part as a poorhouse and infirmary. The late 17th and early 18th century saw a rapid expansion of the city as Limerick took on the appearance of a Georgian City. It was during this time that the city centre took on its present-day look with the planned terraced Georgian Townhouses a characteristic of the city today. Georgian Limerick dates from this period as part of Edmund Sexton Pery's plan for the development of a new city on lands he owned to the south of the existing medieval city. In 1765, he commissioned the Italian engineer Davis Ducart to design a town plan on those lands which have since become known as Newtown Pery. The town was built in stages as Pery sold off leases to builders and developers who built four- and five-story townhouses in the Georgian fashion with long wide and elegant streets in grid plan design with O'Connell Street (previously Georges street) being laid out at this time also and forming the centre of the new town. The earliest Georgian houses are located in John's Square in the Irishtown district of medieval Limerick and along Bank Place, Rutland Street & Patrick Street in the Newtown Pery district which were built by the Arthur family — a prominent Limerick family during the 18th century. Some of Ireland's finest examples of Georgian Architecture can be seen at the Crescent area and Pery Square. A basic sewer system was built in Newtownpery in the reign of George III by simply closing over the gutters. By the time of George's reign, Limerick had 17 gates in the city walls, most of whose names continue in modern city placenames. St. Joseph's Hospital was completed in the south-side by 1827. Wellesley Bridge (later, Sarsfield Bridge) and new wet docks were also built during this time. Chief imports through the port included timber, coal, iron and tar. Exports included beef, pork, wheat, oats, flour and emigrants bound for North America. Exports of food continued during the Great Famine, often requiring the deployment of troops to protect the port.

The new, broad wide and elegant streets of Newtown Pery quickly attracted the city's wealthiest families who left the old overcrowded narrow lanes and streets of medieval Limerick (Englishtown & Irishtown) and marked the decline of the ancient and medieval quarter of Limerick. These parts of the city were left to the poorer citizens of Limerick and became characterised by poverty and squalor. Some tangible links to Limerick's eventful past were lost as historically important buildings were lost due to lack of maintenance such as the Exchange, Ireton's Castle (from the siege of Limerick), and a collection of Flemish and Dutch styled housing that started after the Glorious Revolution (with some surviving up to the mid 20th Century) that fronted onto Nicholas Street, Mary Street, Broad Street & Mungret Street that were eventually knocked due to poor condition.

== Great Famine ==
No statistics exist on how many people in the Limerick area died during the famine. Nationally, the population declined by an average of 20%, half of whom died and half emigrated. While the Great Famine reduced the population of County Limerick by 70,000, the population of the City actually rose slightly, as people fled to the workhouses.

Ships berthed on the Limerick quaysides ready to transport produce from one of the most fertile parts of Ireland, the Golden Vale, to the English ports. Francis Spaight, a Limerick merchant, farmer, British magistrate and ship owner, recorded 386,909 barrels of oats, and 46,288 barrels of wheat being shipped out of Limerick between June 1846 and May 1847. Giving evidence to a British parliament select committee inquiring into the famine, Spaight said that:

I found so great an advantage of getting rid of the pauper population upon my own property that I made every possible exertion to remove them ... I consider the failure of the potato crop to be the greatest possible value in one respect in enabling us to carry out the emigration system.

The same quaysides were the departure point for many emigrant ships sailing over the Atlantic. One week in April 1850 saw four ships, Marie Brennan, Congress, Triumph, an 1849 Youghal built ship, and Hannah, the smallest emigrant ship, glide down the Shannon towards the Americas. The latter three ship had 357 people aboard mostly comprising young men and women, depriving Ireland of their vigour and prosperity which they would bring to other nations instead. The Hannah at 59 feet long could barely hold the 60 passengers and eight crew, yet made eight trans-Atlantic voyages.

== Boycott against Limerick Jews ==
Census returns record one Jew in Limerick in 1861. This doubled by 1871 and doubled again by 1881. Increases to 35, 90 and 130 are shown for 1888, 1892, and 1896 respectively. A small number of Lithuanian Jewish tradespeople, fleeing persecution in their homeland, began arriving in Limerick in 1878. They initially formed an accepted part of the city's retail trade, centred on Collooney St. The community established a synagogue and a cemetery in the 1880s. Easter Sunday of 1884 saw the first of what were to be a series of sporadic violent antisemitic attacks and protests. The wife of Lieb Siev and their child were injured by stones and their house damaged by an angry crowd for which the ringleaders were sentenced to hard labour for a month. In 1892 two families were beaten and a stoning took place on 24 November 1896. Many details about Limerick's Jewish families are recorded in the 1901 census that shows most were peddlers, though a few were described as drapery dealers and grocers.

In 1904 a young Catholic priest, Father John Creagh, of the Redemptorist order, delivered a fiery sermon castigating Jews for rejecting the divinity of Jesus Christ, usury alliance with the Freemasons then persecuting the Catholic Church in France, taking over Limerick's economy, selling shoddy goods at inflated prices paid in instalments. He urged Catholics "not to deal with the Jews." Later, after 32 Jews left Limerick due to the agitation, Fr. Creagh was disowned by his superiors who said that: religious persecution had no place in Ireland. The Limerick Boycott was the economic boycott waged against the small Jewish community for over two years. Keogh suggests the name derives from their previous Lithuanian experience even though no Jews in Limerick were killed or even seriously injured. Limerick's Protestants, many of whom were also traders, supported the Jews throughout the pogrom, but ultimately five Jewish families left the city and 26 families remained.

Some went to Cork, intending to embark on ships from Cobh to travel to America. The people of Cork welcomed them into their homes. Church halls were opened for the refugees, many of whom remained. Gerald Goldberg, a son of this migration, became Lord Mayor of Cork in 1977, and the Marcus brothers, David and Louis, grandchildren of the pogrom, would become hugely influential in Irish literature and Irish film, respectively.

== Struggle for independence ==
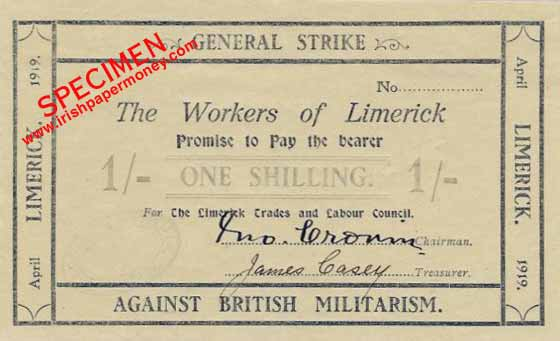
Money printed by the Limerick Soviet in 1919

The IRA and the independence movement of Sinn Féin gained popular support in Limerick following the repressions and executions of 1916. Royal Irish Constabulary carried out violent raids on the homes of suspected Sinn Féin sympathisers. Prisoners were interned without trial in Frongoch camp in North Wales. Following the arrest and death of Robert Byrne, a local republican and trade unionist, most of Limerick city and a part of the county were declared a "Special Military Area under the Defence of the Realm Act". Special permits, to be issued by the RIC, would now be required to enter the city. In response, the Limerick Trades and Labour Council called for a general strike and boycott of the troops. A special strike committee was set up to print their own money and control food prices. The Irish Times referred to this committee as a Limerick Soviet; however, the high degree of involvement of the Catholic Church shows that it was in fact quite different from the recent Bolshevik uprising. An American army officer arriving in Limerick had to appear before the permits committee to get a lift to visit relatives outside Limerick, following which he said,

I guess it is some puzzle to know who rules these parts. You have to get a military permit to get in and be brought before a committee to get a permit to leave.

After 14 days the strike ended with a compromise on the permits issue.

Open conflict erupted on Roches Street in April 1920 between the Royal Welch Fusiliers and the general population, involving bayonets on the one side and stones and bottles on the other. The troops fired indiscriminately, killing a publican and an usherette from the Coliseum Cinema. The British Government organised a new force to quell the population. The Black and Tans, known as "the sweepings of English jails", were formed of ex-servicemen. On the night of 6 March 1921, Limerick's Mayor, George Clancy, and his wife were shot in their home by three Tans. On the same night the previous Mayor, Michael O'Callaghan, and Volunteer Joe O'Donoghue were murdered in their own homes after curfew. These assassinations became known as the Curfew Murders. IRA reprisals included the unsuccessful attack on six RIC men leaving a pub on Mungret Street and the shooting dead of a Black and Tan on Church Street. A truce between the IRA and the British forces came into effect on 9 July 1921.

== Free State ==
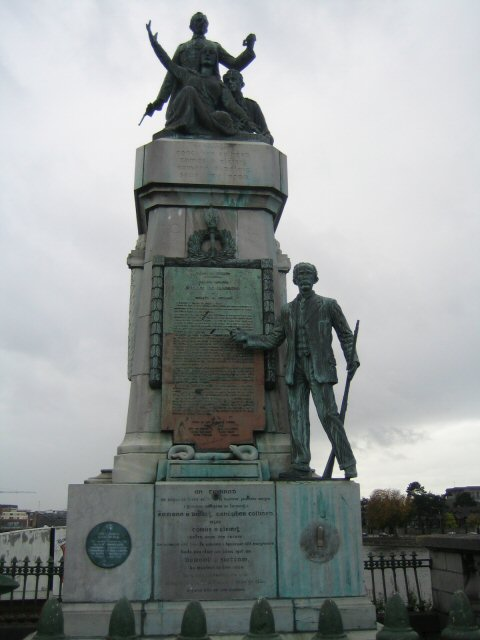
Monument to the 1916 Rising, Sarsfield Bridge sculpted by James Power in 1956

On 5 December 1921 Éamon de Valera gave a speech (in what is now The Strand Hotel on the Ennis Road) cautioning against optimism in the peace process. A few hours later in London, Michael Collins signed the Anglo-Irish Treaty, granting limited independence to the southern portion of Ireland as the Irish Free State, while retaining the six counties of Northern Ireland. The treaty also gifted the ports of Berehaven, Cobh and Lough Swilly to the United Kingdom as UK sovereign bases, while annuities would continue to be paid to the British government in lieu of money loaned to Irish tenants under various land acts. De Valera and others virulently opposed the treaty's compromises. The scene was set for the civil war.

In Limerick, the first signs of trouble came when the British forces withdrew early in the New Year. Three separate Irish factions rushed in to fill the vacuum: The pro-Treaty Claremen of the First-Western Division under General Michael Brennan, who was asked by the new Free-State government to occupy the city because of doubts about the loyalty of Liam Forde's Mid-Limerick Brigade. In the event the Brigade split into pro- and anti-Treaty factions, the latter led by Forde.

William St. became a battle zone by 7 p.m. on 11 July 1922, when the Free State troops opened fire on the Republican garrison holding the Ordnance Barracks. In the chaos, Roches Stores, which still stands on Sarsfield St, was looted. On 17 July, Eoin O'Duffy arrived in the city as part of a nationwide offensive, in command of 1,500 Free State reinforcements equipped with artillery.

The Free State forces brought up an 18-pounder gun on the 19th and blasted a breach in walls of the Ordnance Barracks, which they then stormed. The Castle Barracks was captured the following day. The Republicans then abandoned the city, burning the barracks still in their hands. Limerick Prison, designed to hold 120, contained 800 prisoners by November. The fighting in the city in July 1922, left six Free State soldiers and 12 civilians dead, with a further 87 wounded. The press reports stated that about thirty Anti-Treaty IRA men had been killed but a recent study puts their fatalities at just five.

The Civil War ended the following May in victory for the Free State. De Valera and the Republicans would refuse to take their seats in the new Dáil Éireann until 1927.

The Free State government set about rebuilding the county in the spirit of the times, with grand plans and schemes. The Shannon Scheme, the plan to build a Hydroelectric power station utilising the energy of Ireland's largest river, was begun in 1925. The German electric company Siemens-Schuckert (today Siemens) was awarded the 5.2 million pound contract, providing employment for 750 people. The Electricity Supply Board set up to manage the project gradually oversaw the electrification of rural Ireland.

== The Emergency ==
Almost from the moment that de Valera and his new Fianna Fáil party were elected in 1932, Ireland was plunged into a series of "emergencies". De Valera fulfilled an election promise to suspend the payment of land annuities to Britain, and Britain retaliated by raising import duties on agricultural products to 40%. De Valera swept through the Dáil the "Emergency Imposition of Duties order" imposing reciprocal taxes. The Anglo-Irish Trade War had begun.

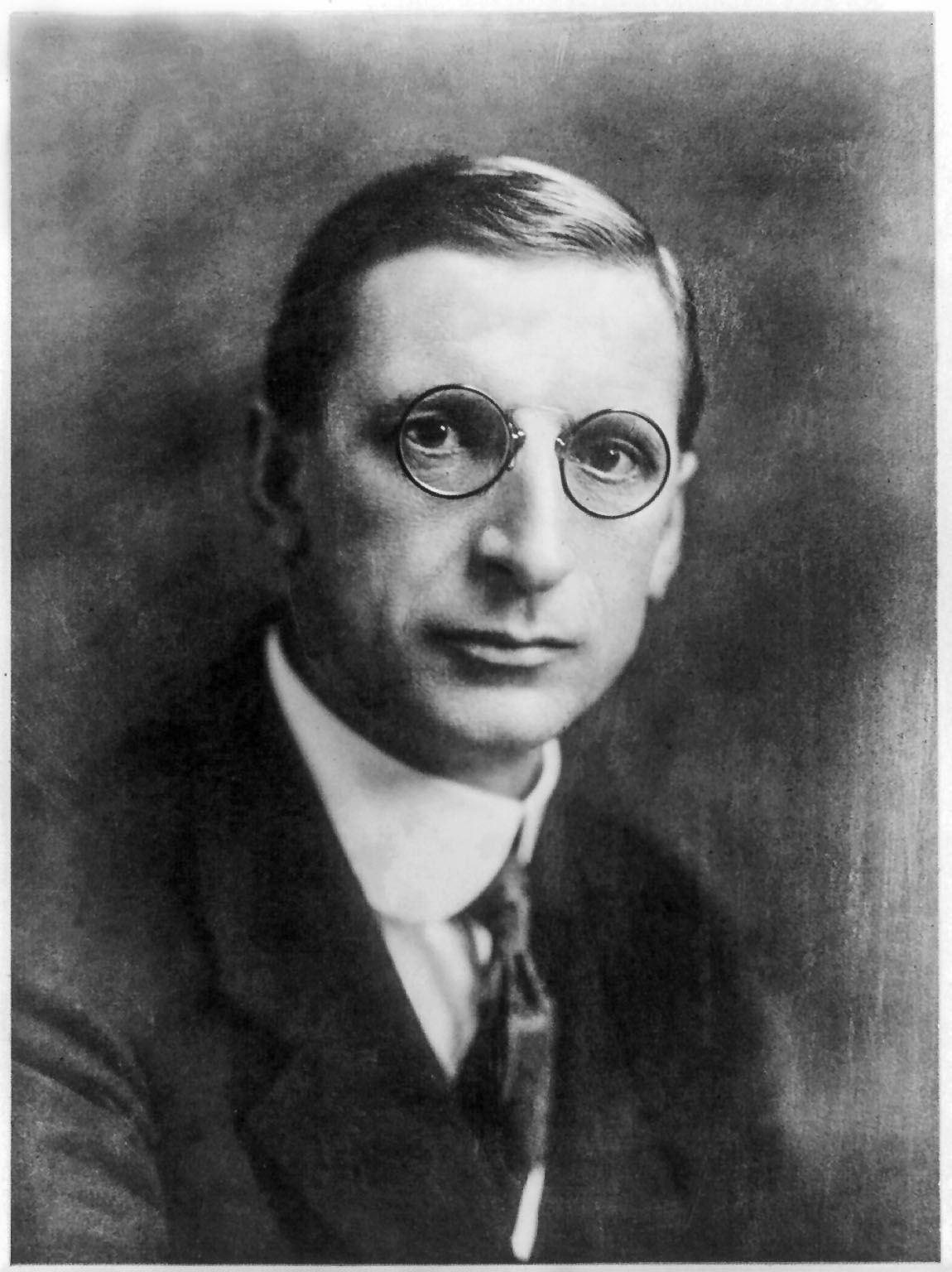
Éamon de Valera (1882–1975)

Limerick's farm-based economy was reduced to a state of barter. This was the period during which Ireland's interventionist, control economic style was developed. The Laissez-faireism of the 1920s was abandoned in the face of skyrocketing unemployment, poverty and emigration. The state set up non-agricultural industries such as Turf Development Board (Later Bord na Móna) and Aer Rianta (airports authority). In 1935 Charles Lindbergh was consulted on the building of an airport on the Shannon Estuary at Rineanna (later renamed Shannon Airport), and in 1937 Foynes was developed as a stopping point on the flying boat route across the Atlantic. During this time, the de Valera government introduced several emergency laws to suppress the IRA and General Eoin O'Duffy's Blueshirt Anti-Fianna Fáil supporters.

This first Emergency ended in 1938 with the Anglo-Irish Free Trade Agreement, when Neville Chamberlain's appeasement policy allowed a climb down. The UK would end economic sanctions and return the treaty ports in exchange for a once-off payment of £10m.

The following year, the outbreak of World War II forced the introduction of the Emergency Powers Act 1939 to control communications, media, prices and imports. Ireland, with no native merchant fleet, and no coal, gas, or oil supplies faced hard times indeed. An army officer named Captain McKenna described it as the day "Realisation dawned on Ireland that the country was surrounded by water, and that the sea was of vital importance to her." Towards the end of the war, shortages of rubber and petrol particularly ended all non-emergency motorised transport, including rail, to and within the city. Lord Adare restarted a four-horse stagecoach route to his hotel in Co. Limerick, a sight not seen since the 19th century.

The army was expanded massively to over 300,000 in preparation for the expected invasion by either Germany, attempting a stepping-stone approach to the invasion of Britain, or Britain herself, seeking use of the ports. Knockalisheen barracks (later Knockalisheen Refugee Camp) was built near Limerick at Meelick to house the new defence forces.

== Post war ==
The economy of the Limerick area was largely neglected in the post war period and the city and county became characterised by extremely high emigration and unemployment. With the exception of Shannon Airport and a few related businesses and a few clothing factories, Limerick had no industry. The economy was based on farming and services, fuelled in no insignificant part by remittances from the extensive diaspora. A few of the many who left became successful abroad, including the actor Richard Harris, the BBC presenter Terry Wogan, and the school teacher turned memoirist, Frank McCourt.

Limerick also had a few famous visitors during this time. In 1963 Irish-American US President John F. Kennedy visited Limerick as part of his tour of Ireland. He was presented with a locally produced christening robe made of Limerick Lace. From 1956, about 500 Hungarian refugees were housed in Knockalisheen, near Meelick a few kilometres from the city, following the failed uprising in their country. A few settled, but the majority moved on within a few years to new lives in the UK and North America due to the bad economic situation in Limerick.

Shannon Airport also attracted a varied crowd. At this time nearly all transatlantic flights stopped at the airport, the most westerly in Europe, to refuel. Irish Times journalist Arthur Quinlan who was based at Shannon boasts at having interviewed every US president from Harry Truman to George H. W. Bush and many Soviet leaders, including Andrey Vyshinsky and Andrei Gromyko. He also famously taught Fidel Castro how to make an Irish coffee and interviewed Che Guevara. On 13 March 1965, Guevara suddenly arrived at the airport when his flight from Prague to Cuba developed mechanical problems, and Quinlan was on hand to interview him. Guevara talked of his Irish connections through the name Lynch and of his grandmother's Irish roots in Galway. Later, Che, and some of his Cuban comrades, went to Limerick city and adjourned to the Hanratty's Hotel on Glentworth Street. According to Quinlan, they returned that evening all wearing sprigs of shamrock, for Shannon and Limerick were preparing for the Saint Patrick's Day celebrations.

In 1968, the government published the Buchanan Report on the regional dimension to economic planning which had largely been ignored. The report recommended on the social and economic sustainability of industry in the regions, which gradually lead to investment and improvement in the Limerick area.

== Celtic Tiger ==
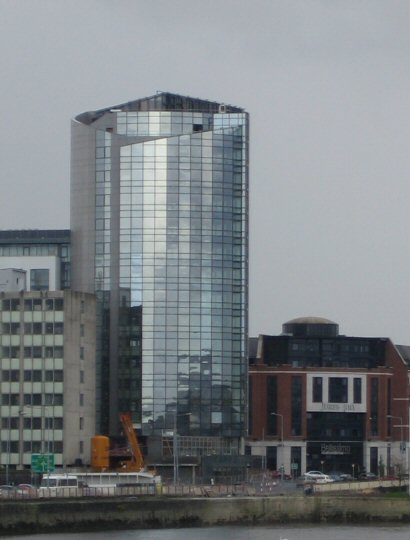
Riverpoint

The seemingly sudden economic growth of the 1990s, termed the Celtic Tiger, making Ireland one of the richest countries in the world, had deep foundations stretching back through the 1980s and 1970s. Shipping in Shannon estuary was developed extensively during the period with more than two billion pounds investment. A tanker terminal at Foynes and an oil jetty at Shannon Airport were built. In 1982 a massive alumina extraction plant was built at Aughinish. Now, 60,000-ton cargo vessels carry raw bauxite from West African mines to the plant, where it is refined to alumina. This is then exported to Canada, where it is further refined to aluminium. In 1985, a huge power plant began operating at Moneypoint, fed by regular visits by 150,000-tonne tankers. European Economic Community funding was poured into infrastructure. Industrial estates at Raheen and Plassey (Castletroy), and energetic government intervention, brought in numerous foreign firms, notably Analog Devices, Wang Laboratories and Dell Computers. A science and engineering focused third-level college called NIHE, Limerick, elevated in 1989 to university status as the University of Limerick, and the establishment of Limerick Institute of Technology (now the Technological University of the Shannon) furthered the area's reputation as Ireland's Silicon Valley. Thomond College of Education, Limerick was a successful teacher training college and was integrated into LIT (now TUS) in 1991.

In 1996, the city had a brief moment of world attention when the Irish writer Frank McCourt published Angela's Ashes for which he won the Pulitzer Prize. The book tells of the author's childhood in a rundown and dirty slum of the 1930s and 40s, In 1999, it was made into a feature film. The slums spoken of in the book had long since been removed, and local people were embarrassed by the sudden unflattering discussion of the city. When McCourt wrote the book's sequel, 'Tis, it was answered with the locally written Tisn't, which painted a better face on the city.

The appearance of the city has been undergoing a gradual face-lift: two new bridges over the Shannon, and a newly opened tunnel complete the orbital road; many of the older buildings have been replaced, some controversially such as the ancient Cruises Hotel (see Architecture of Limerick). Former city architect, Jim Barrett, led the way in turning Limerick around to face the river. Ireland's third tallest building, the 58-meter-high (190 ft) Riverpoint, was completed in 2008 near the Bishop's Quay, overlooking the Shannon. The new wealth not only halted the high levels of emigration chronic through the 1980s, but led to the first large-scale immigration for centuries. The city now boasts a Russian delicatessen, a Chinese supermarket and several South Asian, African and Caribbean food shops. Near the Crescent Shopping Centre, and down the road from the LDS Church, is Limerick's first Mosque.

== Post-2008 financial crisis ==
The 2008 financial crisis, and the resulting Post-2008 Irish economic downturn caused economic damage to Limerick. Like other cities in Ireland, house prices collapsed by 50% from the pre-crash highs and took more than a decade to recover. As of 2017, the economy is recovering at a steady rate.

Today, Limerick has lifted itself to become the capital of the Mid-west region of Ireland. The city hosts many large US Multinational companies such as Johnson & Johnson Vision Care (Ireland) in Castletroy, Regeneron and Eli-lily in Raheen and Verizon in the city centre. The University of Limerick has established a campus on Sarsfield Street in the city and the city's main thoroughfare, O'Connell Street, has received a major facelift. The city remains a centrepoint for retail, hospitality and services.

== Annalistic references ==
See Annals of Inisfallen (AI)

- AI927.2 A slaughter of the foreigners of Port Láirge [was inflicted] at Cell Mo-Chellóc by the men of Mumu and by the foreigners of Luimnech.
- AI930.1 Kl. A naval encampment [made] by the foreigners of Luimnech at Loch Bethrach in Osraige, and Derc. Ferna in Osraige was ravaged by them.
- AI967.2 A defeat of the foreigners of Luimnech by Mathgamain, son of Cennétig, at Sulchuait, and Luimnech was burned by him before noon on the following day.
- AI969.3 Beólán Litil and his son were killed by Ímar of Luimnech.
- AI972.1 Bissextile. Kl. The burning of the house of Dubchrón Ua Longacháin, in which 70 fell; and the banishment of [Norse] officials from Mumu; and the three ordinances, viz., the banishment of the [Norse] officials, the banishment of the foreigners from Luimnech, and the burning of the fortress, were enacted by the counsel of the nobles of Mumu, namely, Mathgamain and Faelán and the son of Bran, and others.
- AI974.5 The son of Bran took the hostages of Mumu from Luimnech southwards, and marched against Mathgamain.
- AI975.1 Kl. Death of Cormac, son of Faelán, by the army of Mathgamain.
- AI975.2 Ímar escaped over sea, and Inis Ubdan was captured again.
- AI972.3 The capture of Mathgamain son of Cennétig, king of Caisel. He was treacherously seized by Donnuban and handed over to the son of Bran in violation of the guarantee and despite the interdiction of the elders of Mumu, and he was put to death by Bran's son.
