= Gofraid mac Amlaíb meic Ragnaill =

- King of Dublin
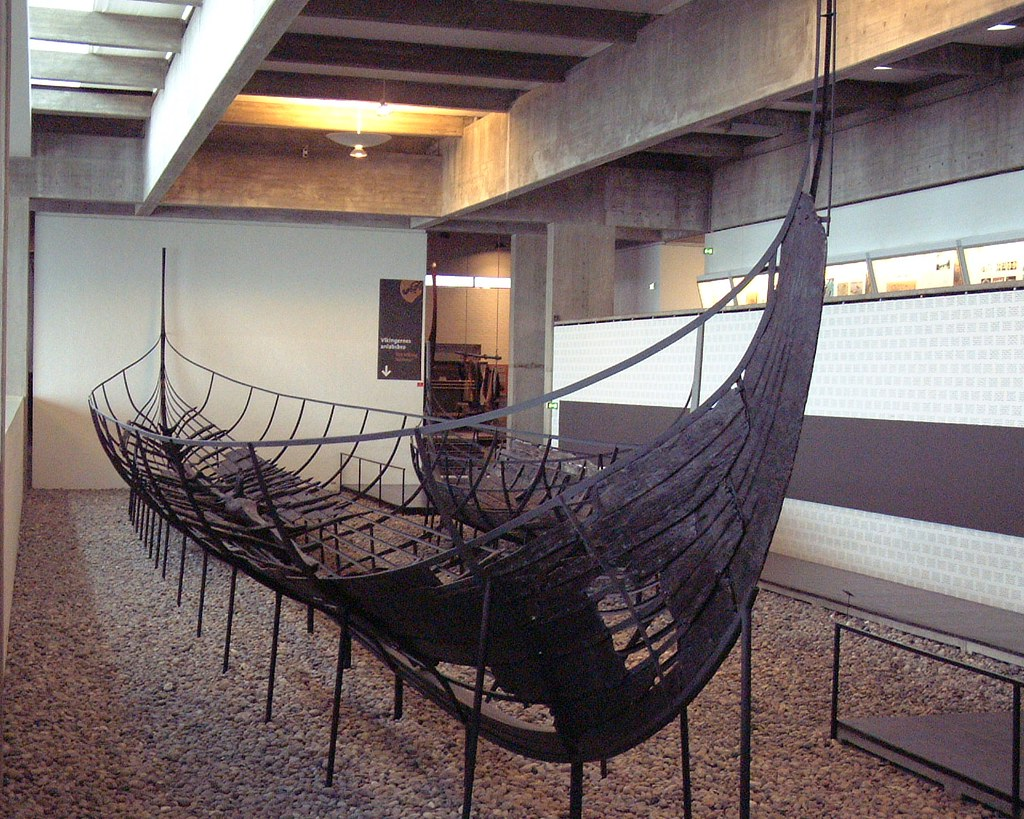
- The remains of Skuldelev II may be evidence that Gofraid aided Anglo-Danish forces against the Norman King of England.
- Reign: 1072–1075
- Predecessor: Toirdelbach Ua Briain
- Successor: Domnall mac Murchada
- Died: 1075
- House: probably Uí Ímair

Gofraid mac Amlaíb meic Ragnaill (died 1075) was a late eleventh-century King of Dublin. (Note: Since the 2000s, academics have accorded Gofraid various patronyms in English secondary sources: Godfrey Olafsson, Godred Olafsson, Goffraid mac Amlaíb meic Ragnaill, Gofraid mac Amlaíb meic Ragnaill, Gofraid mac Amlaíb, Gofraid mac Amlaim meic Ragnaill, Gofraid ua Ragnaill, and Guðrøðr Óláfsson. Likewise, since the 1980s, academics have accorded Gofraid various personal names in English secondary sources: Godfrey, Godred, Goffraid, Gofraid, Gofraidh, Gothric, Guðrøðr, and Guthric.) Although the precise identities of his father and grandfather are uncertain, Gofraid was probably a kinsman of his royal predecessor, Echmarcach mac Ragnaill, King of Dublin and the Isles. Gofraid lived in an era when control of the Kingdom of Dublin was fought over by competing Irish overlords. In 1052, for example, Echmarcach was forced from the kingdom by the Uí Chennselaig King of Leinster, Diarmait mac Maíl na mBó. When the latter died in 1072, Dublin was seized by the Uí Briain King of Munster, Toirdelbach Ua Briain, a man who either handed the Dublin kingship over to Gofraid, or at least consented to Gofraid's local rule.

Gofraid appears to have had little independence from his Uí Briain overlord, as evidence by surviving correspondence between him, Toirdelbach, and Lanfranc, Archbishop of Canterbury. Gofraid's reign came to an end in 1075, when Toirdelbach drove him overseas from Ireland, perhaps to the Kingdom of the Isles, after which he died within the year. On one hand, it is possible that Gofraid was ejected for involving himself in the Anglo-Danish insurrection against the recently established Norman regime of the Kingdom of England. On the other hand, another possibility is that Gofraid was plotting with the Uí Chennselaig against their Uí Briain overlords. Whatever the case, Gofraid was succeeded in Dublin by Domnall mac Murchada, an Uí Chennselaig dynast. Whether the later ruled with Toirdelbach's consent is likewise uncertain. There is reason to suspect that Gofraid may be identical to Gofraid mac Sitriuc, King of the Isles.

== Background ==
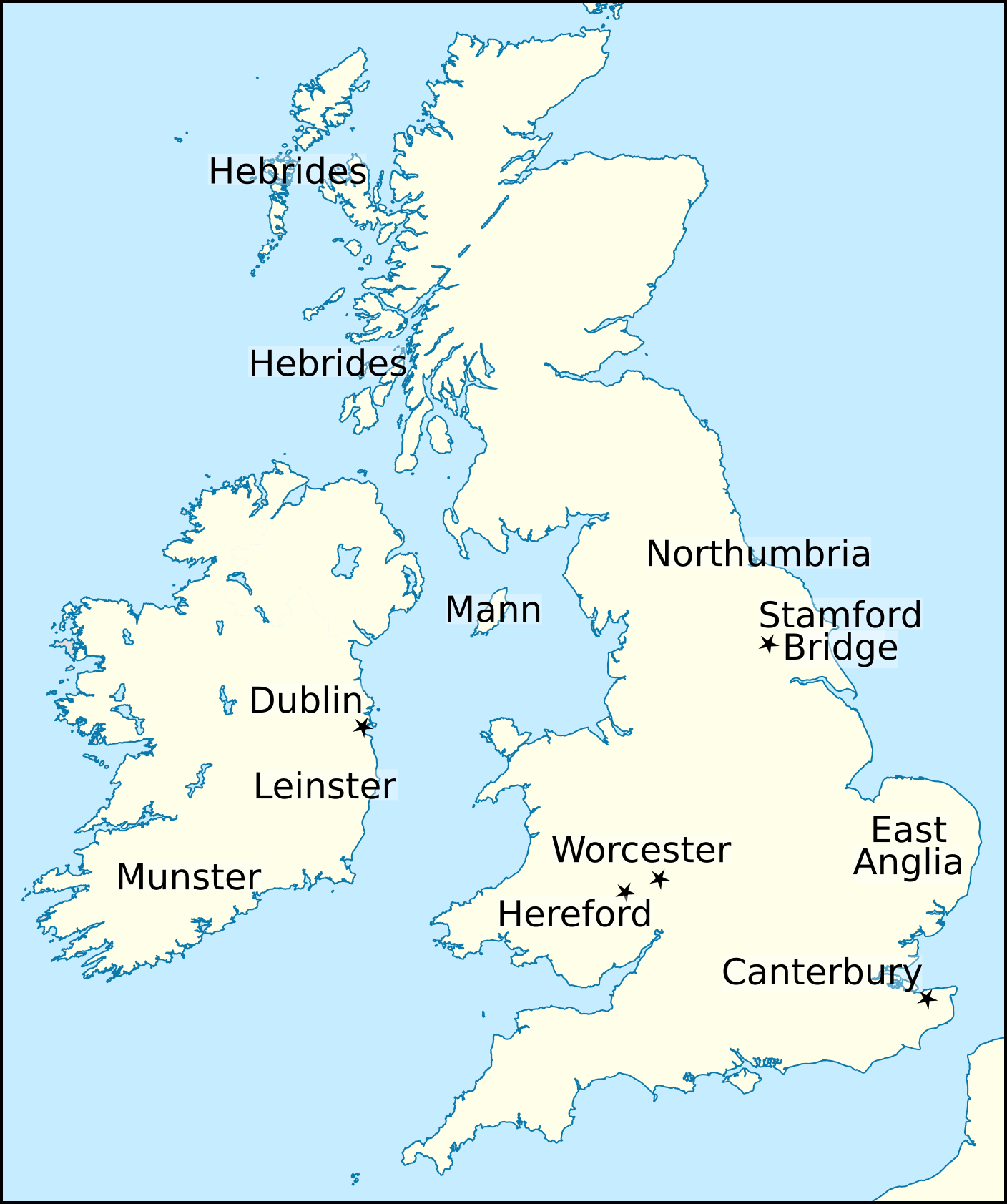
Locations relating to Gofraid's life and times.

Gofraid seems to have been a close kinsman of Echmarcach mac Ragnaill, King of Dublin and the Isles. The familial background of the latter is uncertain. He could have been a member of the Waterford dynasty descended from Ímar, King of Waterford, and thus a descendant of Ímar's son, Ragnall, or the latter's son, Ragnall. Alternately, Echmarcach could have been a member of the Meic Arailt dynasty, and a descendant of Ragnall mac Gofraid, King of the Isles.

In the eleventh- and twelfth-centuries, four candidates to the high-kingship of Ireland managed to gain control of the Kingdom of Dublin, and appoint their intended heirs as its rulers. In effect, control of this Norse-Gaelic coastal kingdom, and the exploitation of its military strength and remarkable wealth, had become a prerequisite for any Irish ruler wishing to stake a claim to the high-kingship.

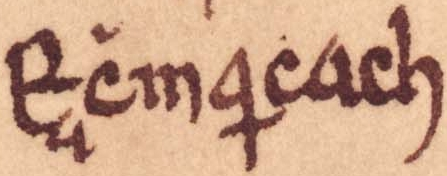
The name of Echmarcach mac Ragnall as it appears on folio 42v of Oxford Bodleian Library Rawlinson B 489 (the Annals of Ulster).

In 1052, Echmarcach was driven overseas from Ireland by Diarmait mac Maíl na mBó, King of Leinster, who thereupon assumed the kingship of Dublin. For the next twenty years, Diarmait controlled the realm, and the town itself served as his capital. About ten years after Diarmait's victory in Dublin, Echmarcach apparently fell prey to Diarmait again, as Mann was raided by Diarmait's son, Murchad, who received tribute from a defeated mac Ragnaill, perhaps Echmarcach himself. Echmarcach eventually died in Rome, in 1064 or 1065. On his death, the contemporary chronicler Marianus Scotus described him in Latin as "rex Innarenn", a title that could either mean "King of the Isles", or "King of the Rhinns". If it represents the latter, it could be evidence that Echmarcach's once expansive sea-kingdom had gradually eroded to territory in Galloway only.

On Diarmait's unexpected death in 1072, Toirdelbach Ua Briain, King of Munster gained overlordship of Leinster, and took control of Dublin. The eleventh- to fourteenth-century Annals of Inisfallen claims that the kingship of Dublin was offered to Toirdelbach by the Dubliners. Although this record may be mere Uí Briain propaganda, it could instead be evidence of the Dubliners' preference for a distant overlord from Munster rather than one from neighbouring Leinster.

== King of Dublin ==
Simplified family tree illustrating possible lines of kinship between Gofraid and other contemporaries. It is not certain whether the three Ragnalls were the same individual. Whilst this is possible, the fathers of Echmarcach and Cacht could have been any of three known contemporaries with the name. Also shown is a possible line of kinship between Gofraid and Sitriuc mac Amlaíb. Also shown is a possible line of kinship between Gofraid and two "sons of the son of Ragnall" slain in 1087; alternately, these unnamed men could have been sons of Echmarcach or Gofraid himself.

Ragnall	Ragnall	Ragnall	Brian Bóruma; K of Ireland (d. 1014)
Echmarcach (d. 1064/1065); K of Dublin and the Isles	Amlaíb	Cacht (d. 1054)	Donnchad (d. 1064); K of Munster	Tadc (d. 1023)
Gofraid (d. 1075); K of Dublin	Sitriuc (d. 1073)	unnamed (died 1087)	Toirdelbach (d. 1086); K of Munster
Mór	Tadc (d. 1086)

=== Accession and attempted consolidation ===
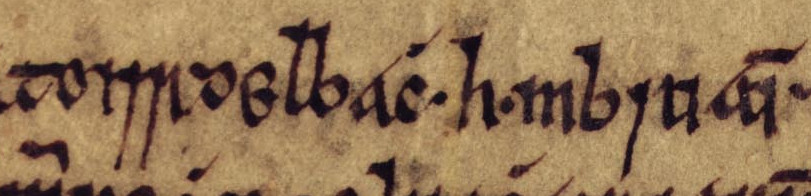
The name of Toirdelbach Ua Briain as it appears on folio 18v of Oxford Bodleian Library Rawlinson B 488 (the Annals of Tigernach): "Toirrdelbach h-Úa m-Briain". Toirdelbach was Gofraid's predecessor in Dublin.

Within the year of Toirdelbach's takeover, the Annals of Inisfallen reveals that Gofraid himself held the kingship of Dublin. Toirdelbach evidently consented to this arrangement, or may have even appointed Gofraid himself, perhaps on account of the considerable distance between the kingdoms of Dublin and Munster.

Uí Briain involvement in the Kingdom of the Isles soon followed their acquisition of Dublin. In 1073, an unsuccessful Irish-based invasion of Mann was apparently repulsed by Fingal mac Gofraid, King of the Isles. The incursion is recorded by the sixteenth-century Annals of Loch Cé and the fifteenth- to sixteenth-century Annals of Ulster, the latter of which states that the expedition was led by a certain Sitriuc mac Amlaíb and two grandsons of Brian Bóruma, High King of Ireland. The precise identity of these three slain raiders is uncertain, as are the circumstances of the expedition itself. It is very likely, however, that the incursion was closely connected to the recent Uí Briain takeover of Dublin.

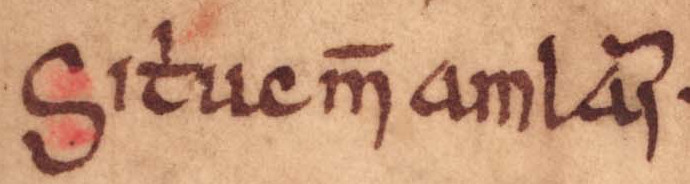
The name of Sitriuc mac Amlaíb as it appears on folio 43v of Oxford Bodleian Library Rawlinson B 489.

There is reason to suspect that Sitriuc was a brother of Gofraid. It is further possible that these two were not only closely related to Echmarcach, but that their family also included Cacht ingen Ragnaill, wife of Donnchad mac Briain, King of Munster. Certainly, Echmarcach's daughter, Mór, married Toirdelbach's son, Tadc. If the Uí Briain were indeed bound to a kindred comprising Gofraid, Sitriuc, Cacht, and Echmarcach, it is possible that—following the Dublin ascendancy of the Uí Briain—Sitriuc and his Uí Briain allies attempted to take what they regarded as his family's patrimony in the Isles.

=== Ecclesiastical affairs ===
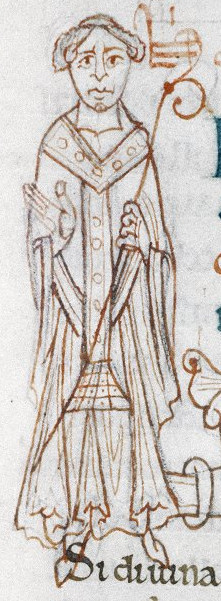
Lanfranc as depicted on folio 1r of Oxford Bodleian Library Bodleian 569.

Significant ecclesiastical appointments in Ireland were generally subject to the endorsement of local kings. Therefore, when Dúnán, Bishop of Dublin died in 1074, Lanfranc, Archbishop of Canterbury was petitioned by Gofraid, on behalf of the clergy and people of Dublin, to consecrate Gilla Pátraic as Dúnán's successor. Lanfranc seems to have used Gilla Pátraic as an intermediary with the Irish, since when he sent Gilla Pátraic to Ireland, Lanfranc dispatched a letter to Gofraid which urged the king to correct moral laxities among his people (practices such as divorce, remarriage, and concubinage). The archbishop also sent a similar letter to Toirdelbach. These Latin letters call Gofraid gloriosius Hiberniae rex ("the glorious King of Ireland"), and Toirdelbach magnificus Hiberniae rex, and appear to indicate that Lanfranc was aware Gofraid had little independence during his kingship, and that the latter was closely bound to the authority of his Uí Briain overlord. At the time, Lanfranc seems to have envisioned Dublin as a metropolitan see, subject to the authority of Canterbury, but with jurisdiction over the entire Irish Church. In the eyes of contemporary Gregorian reformers, the eleventh- and twelfth-century Irish Church was remarkably old-fashioned. One such reformer was Lanfranc, who proceeded to reorganise the Church in the Norse-Gaelic enclaves of Ireland—Dublin in particular. Although the Synod of Cashel, convened in 1101 by Toirdelbach's son Muirchertach, has sometimes been regarded as the first of the reforming Irish synods, it is likely that there were earlier such assemblies. The deliberations concerning the appointment of Gilla Pátraic, a monk with links to Worcester, may well have been one such congregation. Whatever the case, Gofraid's endorsement of Gilla Pátraic, and the ecclesiastical actions of Toirdelbach and Muirchertach, indicate that—in comparison to other contemporary rulers in Scotland and Ireland—the rulers of the Irish Sea region were remarkably receptive to religious reforms.

=== Expulsion overseas ===
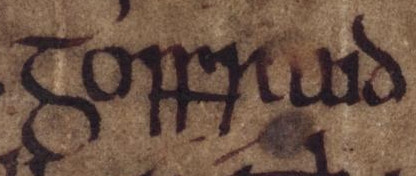
Gofraid's name as it appears on folio 27v of Oxford Bodleian Library Rawlinson B 503 (the Annals of Inisfallen): "Goffraid".

Unfortunately for Gofraid, his reign appears to have been rather brief, as the Annals of Innisfallen, the fourteenth-century Annals of Tigernach, the Annals of Ulster, the Annals of Loch Cé, and the twelfth-century Chronicon Scotorum reveal that his reign and life came to an end in 1075. (Note: The notice of Gofraid's death preserved by the Annals of Ulster appears to be the earliest notice of the title rí Atha Cliath ("king of Dublin"). This title is uncommon in primary sources, and the men regarded by historians as kings of Dublin are more usually styled rí Gall ("king of the foreigners").) Specifically, the Annals of Innisfallen relates that he was banished overseas by Toirdelbach, and that he died "beyond sea", having assembled a "great fleet" to come to Ireland. Gofraid, therefore, appears to have fled to the Isles, and died whilst gathering a fleet to invade Dublin. At some point after his departure, the kingship was taken up by the Uí Chennselaig, in the person of Diarmait's grandson, Domnall mac Murchada. Whether Domnall ruled with the consent of the Uí Briain is uncertain. What is certain is that he died of illness within the year, after which Toirdelbach appointed his eldest son, Muirchertach, as King of Dublin.

== Anglo-Danish insurrections in England ==
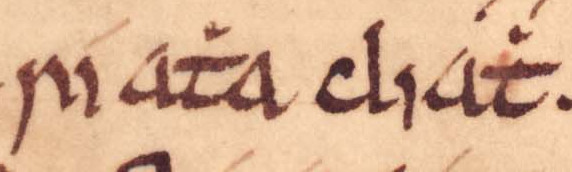
Gofraid's title as it appears on folio 43v of Oxford Bodleian Library Rawlinson B 489.

The precise reason for Gofraid's ejection from Dublin is uncertain. Domnall's brief rise to power immediately after Gofraid's fall could suggest that the latter was involved with the Uí Chennselaig in a revolt against the Uí Briain. Another possibility is that Gofraid may have been involved in the ongoing native resistance to the regime of William I, King of England. In 1066, the latter had toppled the regime of Harold Godwinson, King of England, and dramatically consolidated his control throughout the kingdom. In effect, the Norman Conquest of England resulted in the virtual extirpation of the native Anglo-Danish aristocracy. Even before Harold had succeeded to the throne, Diarmait—Gofraid's predecessor in Dublin—had acted as a close ally of Harold's family. With the fall of Anglo-Saxon England, Diarmait continued to support the Godwinsons, and sheltered several of his sons. From Ireland, the sons launched two significant sea-borne assaults on England's south-western coast. One in 1068, and one 1069. The later attack coincided with a northern English revolt and Danish invasion in the same year. (Note: Specifically, in regards to the latter Irish-based invasion, Diarmait is stated by Orderic Vitalis to have supplied a fleet of sixty-six ships. Of this, only two small boatloads are said to have come back alive.)

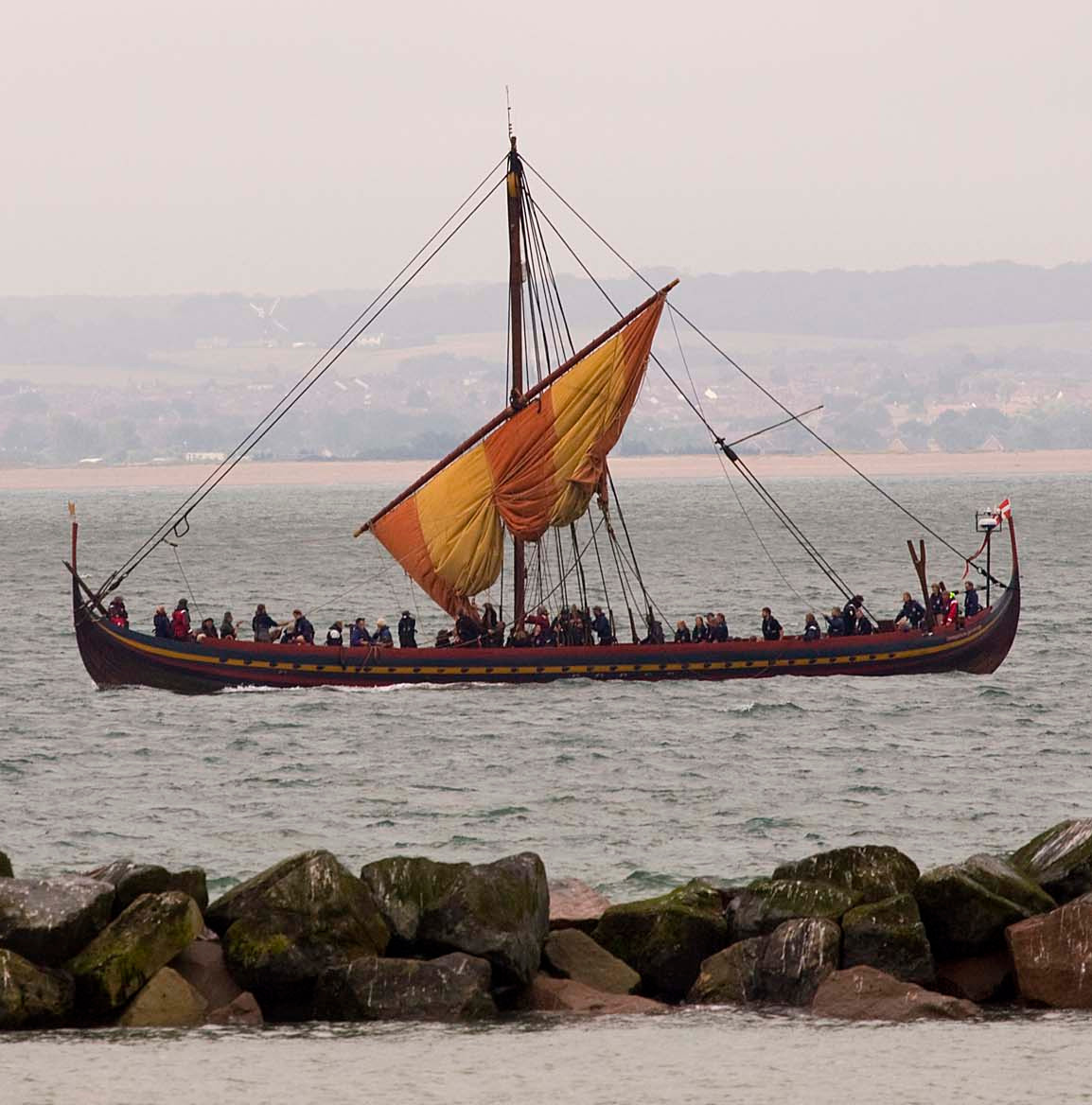
Havhingsten fra Glendalough, a modern Danish reconstruction of Skuldelev II. The original warship, built in Dublin and deliberately sunk in Denmark, dates to Gofraid's floruit.

In 1075, an English revolt against the Norman regime was led by Roger de Breteuil, Earl of Hereford, Ralph de Gael, Earl of East Anglia, and Waltheof, Earl of Northumbria. The uprising was timed to take place when William was away on the continent. The revolt was also strengthened by Danish support, in the form of a fleet of two hundred ships, led by Knútr Sveinsson, brother of Haraldr hein Sveinsson, King of Denmark. Unfortunately for the rebels, the uprising was quelled, largely due to the actions of Wulfstan, Bishop of Worcester, and by the time Knútr's fleet reached the English coast, the revolt was utterly crushed. The Irish dimension in previous insurrections against the Norman regime suggests that Gofraid may have been involved in the revolt of 1075. A twelfth-century eulogy composed for Knútr states that Knútr's fame was known as far as Ireland, and could be evidence of relations between Ireland and Denmark during Toirdelbach's overlordship. In fact, there may be physical evidence of Gofraid's involvement in the form of an eleventh-century longship, Skuldelev II, recovered from Roskilde Fjord in Denmark. Apparently built in Dublin in about 1042, and later repaired in about 1060 or 1075, the ship may be evidence that Gofraid was at least supplying the Danes with warships. (Note: Another possibility is that Skuldelev II arrived in Denmark in the context of the Godwinsons' preparing the Danish and Dublin-based invasion of England in 1069. The ship was originally about thirty metres (98 ft) long, with thirty pairs of oars, and a crew of about sixty to eighty men. The remarkable size of the ship suggests it was the property of a pre-eminent lord, and was likely a class of warship known in Old Norse as skeið (scegð in Old English). The ship may have been commissioned during the reign of Ímar mac Arailt, King of Dublin.)

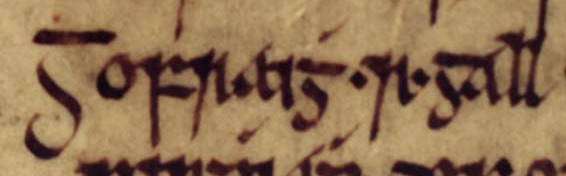
Gofraid's name and title as it appears on folio 18v of Oxford Bodleian Library Rawlinson B 488: "Gofraidh rí Gall".

Whilst Diarmait supported William's English opponents, Toirdelbach appears to have ushered in an era of close co-operation with William's regime. If Dubliners were indeed involved in the English revolt of 1075, this may well have led to Gofraid's expulsion by his Uí Briain overlord. In fact, it may be relevant that Wulfstan, who played a leading role in repelling the uprising of 1075, was a close associate of the recently consecrated Gilla Pátraic, who was in turn on good terms with Toirdelbach. Whatever the case, the record of Gofraid's supposed "great fleet" of 1075 may actually refer to Knútr's assembled fleet of the same year—an armada which may have been regarded by the Irish annalist to have been affiliated with the exiled Gofraid.

== Gofraid mac Sitriuc ==
The name of Gofraid mac Sitriuc as it appears on folio 32v of British Library Cotton Julius A VII (the Chronicle of Mann): "Godredus filius Sytric rex Manniæ".

A like-named contemporary of Gofraid was Gofraid mac Sitriuc, King of the Isles. The latter is attested in 1066 by the thirteenth- to fourteenth-century Chronicle of Mann, which states that he gave sanctuary to Gofraid Crobán following the Norwegian rout at the Battle of Stamford Bridge. According to the chronicle, Gofraid mac Sitriuc died in 1070, and was succeeded in the Isles by his son, Fingal. Not long after the latter's accession, Gofraid Crobán conquered Mann and seized the kingship for himself. Whether he accomplished this feat at the expense of Fingal is uncertain.

If Gofraid is identical to Gofraid mac Sitriuc, it could be evidence that Gofraid succeeded Echmarcach in Dublin and the Isles. If this identification is correct, and these men were furthermore descendants of Ragnall mac Gofraid, it would mean that the latter's family—the Meic Arailt—controlled the Isles in the 1070s. If that was indeed the case, it would mean that Sitriuc—slain in the ill-fated invasion of Mann in 1073—was unlikely a member of this kindred, and more likely a member of the Meic Amlaíb, a rival family descended from Amlaíb Cuarán, King of Northumbria and Dublin. Furthermore, if Gofraid and Gofraid mac Sitriuc are indeed identical, it would mean that Gofraid almost certainly fled to Mann after his expulsion from Dublin, and that Gofraid Crobán—an apparent member of the rival Meic Amlaíb—seized the kingship of the Isles at some point after his death. Nevertheless, there is reason to suspect that Gofraid and Gofraid mac Sitriuc were in fact different individuals, and that the latter was a Meic Amlaíb kinsmen of Gofraid Crobán.
