= Domnall mac Murchada =

- King of Leinster; King of Dublin
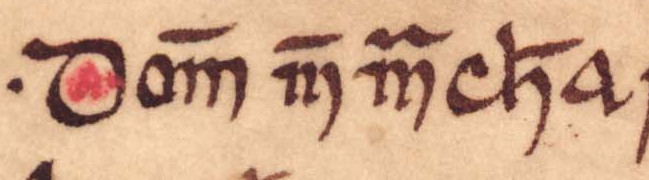
- Domnall's name as it appears on folio 43v of Oxford Bodleian Library Rawlinson B 489 (the Annals of Ulster).

King of Leinster
- Reign: 1072–1075
- Predecessor: Diarmait mac Máel na mBó
- Successor: Donnchad mac Domnaill Remair

King of Dublin
- Reign: 1075
- Predecessor: Gofraid mac Amlaíb meic Ragnaill
- Successor: Muirchertach Ua Briain
- Died: 1075
- House: Meic Murchada (Uí Chennselaig)
- Father: Murchad mac Diarmata

Domnall mac Murchada (died 1075), also known as Domnall mac Murchada meic Diarmata, was a leading late eleventh-century claimant to the Kingdom of Leinster, and a King of Dublin. As a son of Murchad mac Diarmata, King of Dublin and the Isles, Domnall was a grandson of Diarmait mac Máel na mBó, King of Leinster, and thus a member of the Uí Chennselaig. Domnall was also the first of the Meic Murchada, a branch of the Uí Chennselaig named after his father.

In 1071, the year before his grandfather's death, Domnall and an Uí Chennselaig kinsman, Donnchad mac Domnaill Remair, battled for control of Leinster. Although Domnall is accorded the title King of Leinster in one mediaeval king-list, Donnchad was evidently a more powerful claimant, and Domnall appears to have held the Leinster kingship in name only.

Domnall's rise to power in the Kingdom of Dublin took place in 1075, after the expulsion of the reigning Gofraid mac Amlaíb meic Ragnaill, King of Dublin by the latter's overlord, Toirdelbach Ua Briain, King of Munster. The circumstances surrounding Domnall's accession are uncertain. He may have collaborated with Gofraid to wrench the kingdom from the grip of the Uí Briain, or he may have been installed in the kingship by Toirdelbach himself, and ruled under the latter's overlordship. Whatever the case, Domnall died within the year, and Toirdelbach placed his own son, Muirchertach, upon the throne.

== Background ==
Simplified family tree of the Uí Chennselaig, displaying Domnall's degree of kinship with his immediate Uí Chennselaig predecessors, and his main rival, Donnchad mac Domnaill Remair. (Note: Domnall's father was the eponymous founder of the Meic Murchada branch of the Uí Chennselaig, whilst Donnchad mac Domnaill Remair's father was the eponymous father of the Uí Domnaill branch.)

Donnchad died 1006
Domnall Remar died 1041	Diarmait died 1072
Donnchad died 1089	Glún Iairn died 1070	Murchad died 1070	Énna Bacach died 1092
Donnchad died 1115	Domnall died 1075	Énna

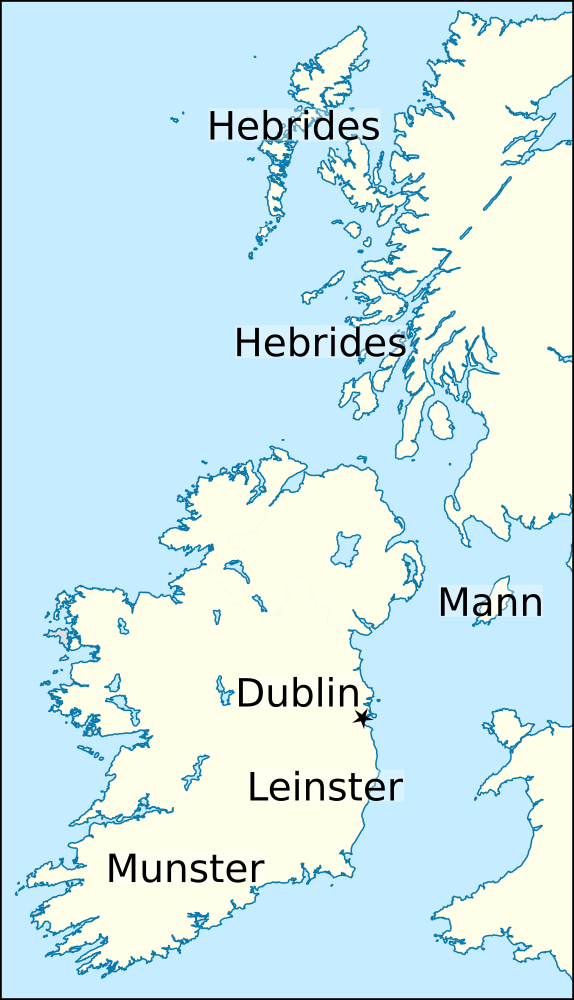
Locations relating to Domnall's life and times.

Domnall was a son of Murchad mac Diarmata, King of Dublin and the Isles, who was himself a son of Diarmait mac Máel na mBó, King of Leinster. Domnall was, therefore, a member of the Uí Chennselaig; as well as the first of the Meic Murchada, a branch of the Uí Chennselaig named after his father. Domnall had two brothers: Donnchad, a later King of Leinster, and Énna.

In 1052, Domnall's aforesaid grandfather conquered the Kingdom of Dublin from Echmarcach mac Ragnaill, King of Dublin and the Isles, and soon after appointed Murchad as King of Dublin. About a decade later, Murchad appears to have driven Echmarcach from Mann, after which he gained the kingship of the Isles. Diarmait's deep-rooted authority in Norse-Gaelic Dublin lasted for two decades, and was a remarkable achievement that no other Irish king had ever accomplished. Unfortunately for the Uí Chennselaig, two of Diarmait's sons—Murchad and Glún Iairn—unexpectedly predeceased their father in 1070, and Diarmait himself fell in battle two years later.

== Kingship of Leinster ==
Even before Diarmait's demise, the Uí Chennselaig began to fight amongst themselves in a struggle that was almost certainly an after-effect of Diarmait's sons' untimely deaths. Specifically, the seventeenth-century Annals of the Four Masters, and the eleventh- to fourteenth-century Annals of Inisfallen reveal that Domnall battled against the forces of his own first cousin once removed, Donnchad mac Domnaill Remair, before Diarmait's ally, Toirdelbach Ua Briain, King of Munster, was able to intervene and restore order in the Kingdom of Leinster.

Up until about the time of his death, Diarmait had been the most powerful king in southern Ireland. In consequence of the void left by his demise, Diarmait's erstwhile ally Toirdelbach seized the initiative, and moved to enforce his own claim to the high-kingship of Ireland. He immediately imposed his overlordship on Leinster—a task almost certainly expedited by the aforesaid infighting amongst the Uí Chennselaig—and took control of Dublin. Whilst the imposition of authority upon rival provincial kingdoms was a fundamental part in gaining the high-kingship, Toirdelbach's decision to march-on Dublin reveals that the acquisition of this coastal kingdom had also become an essential part of the process.

The drinking horns of Cualann, who in the province holds possession of them?
It is to Domnall that the set of goblets is allotted.

— a piece of eleventh-century praise poetry concerning Domnall's apparent kingship in Leinster. (Note: The ale of Cuala, a so-called "drink of sovereignty", was an ancient symbol of kingship, and one of the prerogatives of the kings of Leinster. According to Scéla Cano meic Gartnáin, a ninth-century tale about a seventh-century prince, no one shall become king of Ireland without attaining this ale, meaning that to attain the Irish kingship one must first gain the subjection of Leinster.)

Toirdelbach's subsequent capture of Donnchad in Dublin suggests that the latter was not only the leading Uí Chennselaig dynast, but was also in the process of using the town as the capital of Leinster. Although the list of Leinster kings in the twelfth-century Book of Leinster declares that Domnall had succeeded his grandfather as King of Leinster, it is apparent that Donnchad was indeed the more powerful claimant. In fact, the king-list of Uí Chennselaig in the same source makes no notice of Domnall, and states that it was Donnchad who succeeded Diarmait as King of Uí Chennselaig. Domnall, therefore, may not have reigned in Leinster, and could well have been King of Leinster in name only.

If the Annals of Inisfallen is to be believed, Toirdelbach acquired possession of Dublin when the Dubliners themselves offered him its kingship. Although this record may be mere Uí Briain propaganda, it could instead reveal that the Dubliners preferred a distant overlord from Munster rather than one from neighbouring Leinster. Within the year, the kingship was held by Gofraid mac Amlaíb meic Ragnaill. The latter appears to have been a kinsman of Echmarcach, and may well have been handed the kinship by Toirdelbach, perhaps on account of the considerable distance between the kingdoms.

== Kingship of Dublin ==
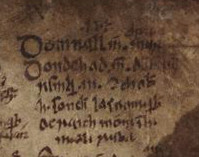
Excerpt from Trinity College Dublin 1339, page 39 (the Book of Leinster) concerning Domnall and Donnchad, and the succession of the kingship of Leinster. Despite Domnall's inclusion here, it is uncertain how much authority he had in Leinster.

In 1075, Toirdelbach drove Gofraid from the kingship and Ireland itself. There is uncertainty concerning the circumstances of Gofraid's expulsion, and of Domnall's accession. On one hand, it is possible that Gofraid was involved in lending assistance to Anglo-Danish resistance against the Norman regime in the recently conquered Kingdom of England. If correct, Gofraid would appear to have been at odds with Toirdelbach, a monarch who appears to have cultivated close links with the Norman regime. Domnall, therefore, may have had Toirdelbach's consent to rule in Dublin as Gofraid's replacement. In fact, Toirdelbach's placement of Domnall in Dublin, and his allowance of the latter's aforesaid cousin in Leinster, may have been a way in which the Uí Briain exploited the fractured Uí Chennselaig. Certainly, Domnall's cooperation would have been a valuable asset to Toirdelbach, considering the prominence of his father amongst the Dubliners, and the likelihood that Domnall himself may have lived most of his life there. (Note: The Annals of the Four Masters preserve twenty lines of poetic verse in accompaniment to the record of Murchad's death in 1070. The first line reads: "Cumha áird-righ i n-Ath Cliath" ("There is grief for a chief king at Dublin").) On the other hand, it is possible that Gofraid was driven from the kingship because he had aligned himself with the Leinstermen against the Uí Briain. If such a sequence of events is correct it could mean that, even though Gofraid was unable continue on with the revolt, it was his Uí Chennselaig confederates who succeeded in securing Dublin from the Uí Briain.

Whatever the circumstances of Domnall's accession, the Uí Chennselaig regime in Dublin was short-lived. The Annals of Inisfallen, the Annals of the Four Masters, and the fifteenth- to sixteenth-century Annals of Ulster, all reveal that, within the year, Domnall died after a brief illness, with the latter two sources specifying that he succumbed after three nights of sickness. The Annals of Inisfallen and the Annals of Ulster accord him the title King of Dublin, and make no mention of any connection with the Leinster kingship. Upon Domnall's demise, Toirdelbach had his own son, Muirchertach, appointed King of Dublin. In so doing, Toirdelbach reinforced his authority in Dublin, and followed a precedent started by Domnall's grandfather, in which a claimant to the high-kingship of Ireland installed his own heir to the kingship of Dublin.

== Ancestry ==
Ancestors of Domnall mac Murchada

16. Diarmait mac Domnaill, King of Uí Chennselaig (died 996)
8. Donnchad mac Diarmata, King of Uí Chennselaig (died 1006).
4. Diarmait mac Máel na mBó, King of Leinster (died 1072)
18. Gilla Pátraic mac Donnchada, King of Osraige
9. Aífe ingen Gilla Pátraic
2. Murchad mac Diarmata, King of Dublin and the Isles (died 1070)
1. Domnall mac Murchada, King of Dublin (died 1075)

== Citations ==
Domnall mac Murchada Meic Murchada Cadet branch of the Uí Chennselaig
Regnal titles
Preceded by Diarmait mac Máel na mBó	King of Leinster; 1072–1075	Succeeded by Donnchad mac Domnaill Remair
Preceded by Gofraid mac Amlaíb meic Ragnaill	King of Dublin; 1075	Succeeded by Muirchertach Ua Briain
