= Domnall Gerrlámhach =

- King of Dublin
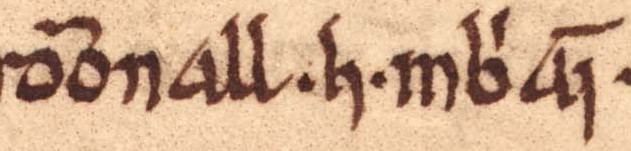
- Domnall's name as it appears on folio 48r of Oxford Bodleian Library Rawlinson B 489 (the Annals of Ulster)
- Died: 1135; Lismore
- House: Uí Briain
- Father: Muirchertach Ua Briain
- Mother: Derb Forgaill ingen Uí Laidcnén

Domnall Gerrlámhach (died 1135), also known as Domnall Gerrlámhach Ua Briain, Domnall mac Muirchertaig, and Domnall Ua Briain, was an obscure twelfth-century Uí Briain dynast and King of Dublin. He was one of two sons of Muirchertach Ua Briain, High King of Ireland. Domnall's father appears to have installed him as King of Dublin in the late eleventh or early twelfth century, which suggests that he was his father's successor-designate. Although Domnall won a remarkable victory in the defence of the Kingdom of Dublin in the face of an invasion from the Kingdom of Leinster in 1115, he failed to achieve the successes of his father. After his final expulsion from Dublin at the hands of Toirdelbach Ua Conchobair, King of Connacht, and the death of his father, Domnall disappears from record until his own death in 1135. He was perhaps survived by two sons.

== Background ==
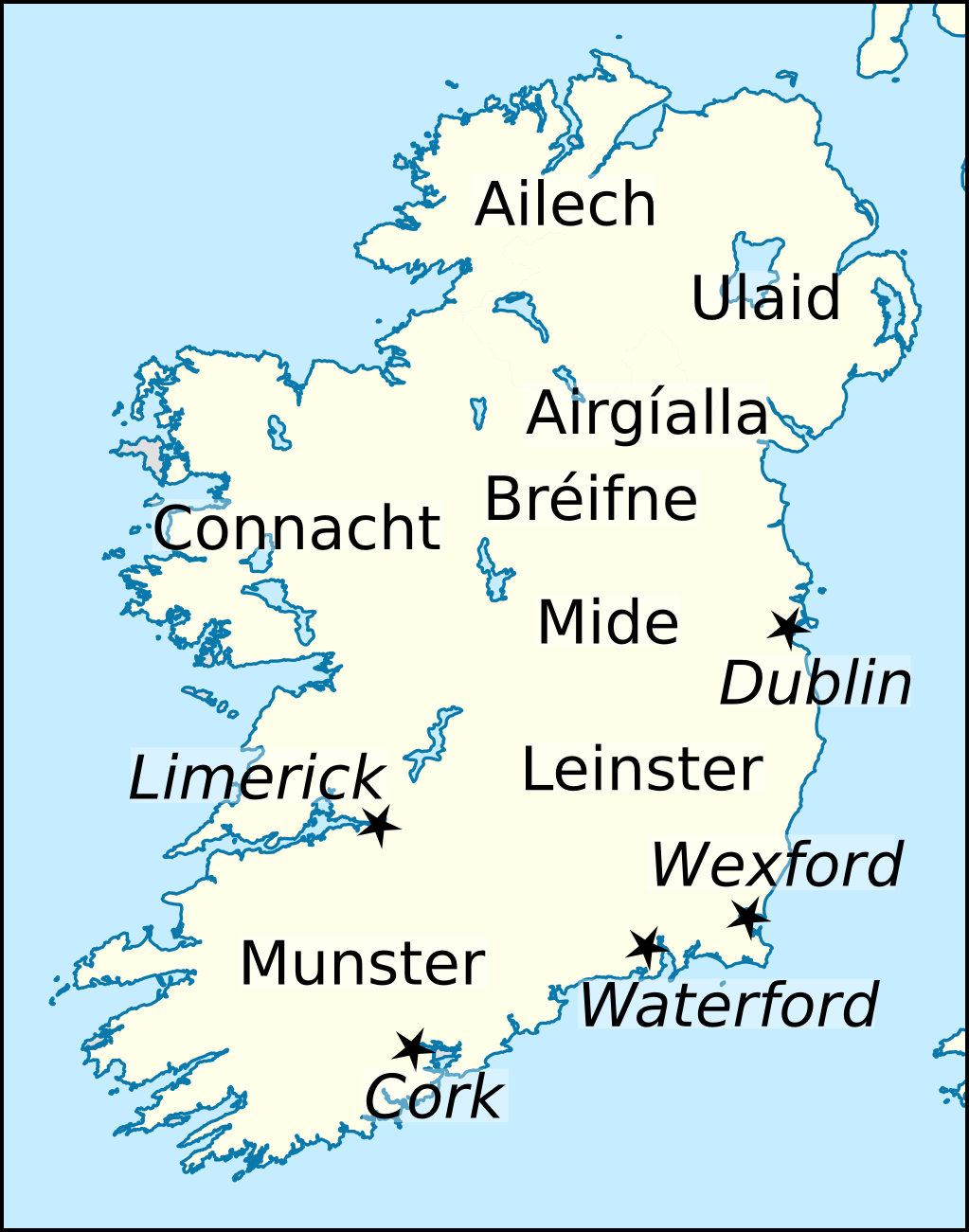
Locations of significant Norse-Gaelic settlements, including the Kingdom of Dublin, and major Irish kingdoms, including Kingdom of Munster.

Domnall was one of two recorded sons of Muirchertach Ua Briain, High King of Ireland; the other being Mathgamain. Domnall was a member of the Uí Briain, a branch of the Dál Cais, descended from the eponymous Brian Bóruma mac Cennétig, High King of Ireland. Domnall's mother was Derb Forgaill, daughter of Lethlobar Ua Laidcnén, King of Airgíalla. The fourteenth-century Annals of Tigernach accord Domnall the epithet gerrlámhach ("short-armed") which may indicate—if the term is taken literally—that he suffered some sort of deformity.

Muirchertach Ua Briain was one of three sons of Toirdelbach Ua Briain, High King of Ireland, a man who secured control of the Kingdom of Munster in the 1060s before gaining the high-kingship of Ireland less than a decade later. In 1075, in an act of overlordship over the Kingdom of Dublin, Toirdelbach Ua Briain appointed Muirchertach Ua Briain King of Dublin, following a precedent set by Diarmait mac Maíl na mBó, King of Leinster, a previous claimant to the Irish high-kingship who had done the same to his own eldest son, Murchad, in 1052. When Toirdelbach Ua Briain finally died in 1086, his sons bitterly contested the kingship of Munster before Muirchertach Ua Briain succeeded in securing it for himself. By 1091, the latter appears to have regained control of the Dublin, only to lose it to Gofraid Crobán, King of the Isles, who united it with the Kingdom of the Isles. Gofraid's reign in Ireland was short-lived, as Muirchertach Ua Briain forced him from Dublin in 1094. After the Gofraid's death the following year, Muirchertach Ua Briain appointed his own nephew, Domnall mac Taidc, as King of the Isles. Uí Briain influence in the Isles was similarly short-lived, however, as Domnall mac Taidc was apparently forced from the region, and Magnús Óláfsson, King of Norway seized control of not only the Isles, but perhaps even Dublin itself, before falling in battle in 1103. Later in 1111, Domnall mac Taidc temporarily seized the kingship of the Isles in an act that may have been opposed by his aforesaid uncle. The reasons for Domnall mac Taidc's exit from the Isles are uncertain. Although he may have been forcibly ejected by the Islesmen, he may well have returned to Ireland to take advantage of Muirchertach Ua Briain's rapidly failing health.

== Kingship of Dublin ==
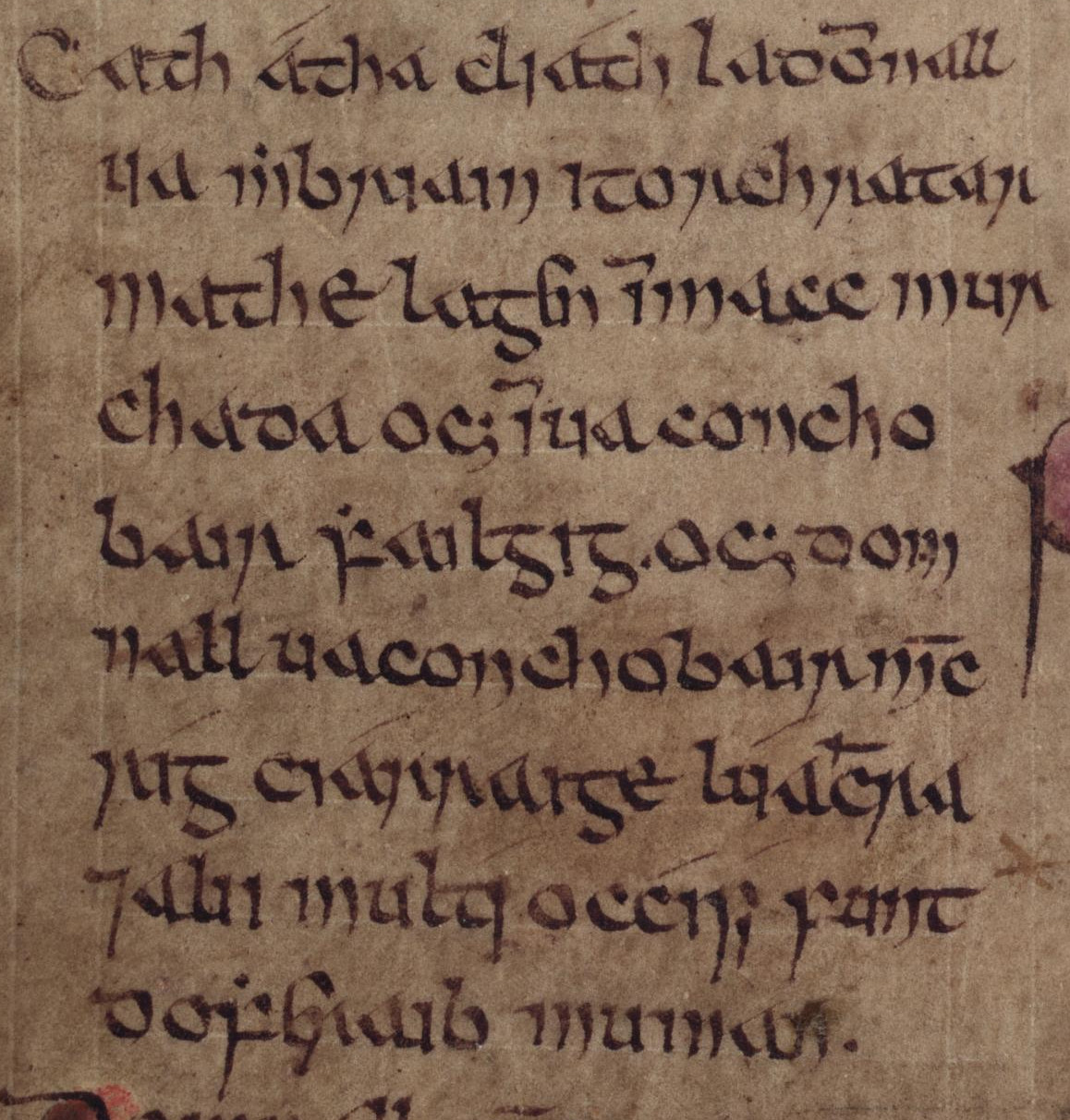
Excerpt from folio 34r of Oxford Bodleian Library Rawlinson B 503 (the Annals of Inisfallen) concerning Domnall's participation in the defence of Dublin in 1115. Domnall's name appears in the top two lines of script.

In 1114, the power of a now-gravely ill Muirchertach Ua Briain's began to waver. The kingship of Munster was temporarily seized by Muirchertach Ua Briain's half-brother, Diarmait Ua Briain. The record of a grant to Christ Church Cathedral, in which Domnall is styled "King of Ireland", appears to suggest that he attempted to assert a claim to the kingship as well. In fact, the fifteenth-century Mac Carthaigh's Book specifically states that Domnall was installed in the kingship of Dublin by his father in 1114. Although Muirchertach Ua Briain's problems were lessened with the death Domnall mac Taidc in 1115, within the year the co-kings of Leinster—Donnchad mac Murchada and Conchobar Ua Conchobair Failge, King of Uí Failge—took advantage of his own decline, and attempted to gain control of Dublin by way of a major assault upon the town. In fact, Domnall's father and grandfather had excluded the Kingdom of Leinster from overlordship of Dublin for the last forty years. Furthermore, not only was Conchobar an unremitting opponent of Domnall's father, but Donnchad possessed several links to the kingship of Dublin as he was married to Domnall mac Taidc's sister, and further had a claim of his own, as both his father and grandfather—Murchad and Diarmait mac Maíl na mBó—held the kingship during their own careers. (Note: Donnchad's wife was Bé Binn ingen Taidc. Both she and her aforesaid brother were maternal grandchildren of Echmarcach mac Ragnaill, King of Dublin and the Isles.)

The prospect of overlordship from nearby Leinster, as compared to the more distant and anaemic overlordship of Munster, appears to have compelled the Dubliners to oppose the Leinstermen. The ensuing battle itself is recorded by both the fifteenth- to sixteenth-century Annals of Ulster and the eleventh- to fourteenth-century Annals of Inisfallen, which reveal that it was Domnall himself who marshalled the forces of Munster to victory. Considering Munster's weakened state, his triumph in Dublin was a remarkable achievement. Unfortunately for Donnchad, however, he lost his life in the encounter; and according to the thirteenth-century ecclesiast Giraldus Cambrensis, the Dubliners added insult to injury by burying his corpse with that of a dog as a show of contempt to the Leinstermen. There is uncertainty as to when Domnall originally gained the kingship of Dublin. His father could have installed him as such upon assuming the Irish high-kingship, or perhaps following the aforesaid ousting of Gofraid Crobán in 1094—although it is not impossible that Domnall mac Taidc was installed as king at this point instead. Another possibility is that Domnall had been appointed king not long before his victory over the Leinstermen—perhaps upon his father's failing health in 1114—or else not long after his successful defense of Dublin. Whatever the case, the evidence of Domnall's kingship indicates that Muirchertach Ua Briain was the third consecutive claimant to the high-kingship to appoint an intended successor to the kingship of Dublin.

Although Muirchertach Ua Briain recovered enough to regain power in Munster within the year, Dublin was later lost to Donnchad's kinsman and Leinster successor, Diarmait mac Énna meic Murchada, King of Leinster, who died there in 1117. Meanwhile, as Muirchertach Ua Briain's power continued to evaporate, the authority of Toirdelbach Ua Conchobair, King of Connacht ever increased. In 1118, several sources, such as the sixteenth-century Annals of Loch Cé, the seventeenth-century Annals of the Four Masters, the twelfth-century Chronicon Scotorum, and the Annals of Tigernach, indicate that Toirdelbach Ua Conchobair gained control of Dublin. In fact, the later source specifies that he had driven Domnall from the kingship once and for all, revealing that Domnall had regained the kingship following Diarmait mac Énna's death in 1117. Although this source also relates that hostages from the "northern half of Ireland" were recovered from Dublin by Toirdelbach Ua Conchobair, a statement perhaps indicative of the power that Domnall managed to preserve over northern realms once firmly under his father's suzerainty, at his height Domnall's father had been one of the most successful Uí Briain monarchs, and Domnall was unable to match his accomplishments. Domnall's victory in Dublin marked the beginning of the end of Munster domination of Norse-Gaelic Dublin. Before the frail Muirchertach Ua Briain finally died in 1119, he was forced to resign the kingship of Munster in favour of his half-brother. When the latter died in 1118, Toirdelbach Ua Conchobair had the realm partitioned between Tadc Mac Carthaig in the Kingdom of Desmond, and the sons of Diarmait Ua Briain in the Kingdom of Thomond. Domnall himself was excluded from the kingship.

== Death ==
Excerpt from folio 486v of Dublin Royal Irish Academy C iii 3 (the Annals of the Four Masters), a seventeenth-century manuscript documenting Domnall's death in 1135. The annal entry literally calls Domanall a lord of "the foreigners" and of Leinster.

Thereafter Domnall disappears from record until his death, as an old man at Lismore, dated by the Annals of the Four Masters to 1135. The annal entry itself describes him as a one-time lord of Leinster, which could be evidence that he had tried to seize Leinster at some point in his career. The Annals of Tigernach apparently also record Domnall's death, although the annal entry identifies him as a grandson of Muirchertach Ua Briain. Long afterwards in 1157, Muirchertach Mac Lochlainn, King of Cenél nEógain, a contender to the Irish high-kingship, invaded the partitioned Munster and forced the submission of Diarmait Mac Carthaig, and further drove out Toirdelbach mac Diarmata Uí Briain—the son of Domnall's aforesaid uncle, Diarmait Ua Briain—and replaced him with another Uí Briain dynast, Conchobar mac Domnaill Uí Briain, King of Ormond. The latter was likely a brother of Lughaid mac Domnaill Uí Briain who was slain in the battle of Móin Mhór in 1151. Both men—Conchobar and Lughaid—could well have been sons of Domnall himself.

== Primary Source Data ==
Excerpt from folio 486v of Dublin Royal Irish Academy C iii 3 (the Annals of the Four Masters), a seventeenth-century manuscript documenting Domnall's death in 1135. The annal entry literally calls Domanall a lord of "the foreigners" and of Leinster.

This entry in the Annals of the Four Masters speaks the battle of 1115 between Domnall Gerrlámhach (aka Domhnall Ua Briain) and Donnchad mac Murchada (aka Donnchadh Ua Mael-na-mbo)

- M1115.5 "A battle was gained by Domhnall Ua Briain and the foreigners of Ath-cliath over the Leinstermen, wherein fell Donnchadh Ua Mael-na-mbo, lord of Ui-Ceinnsealaigh, and Conchobhair Ua Conchobhair, lord of Ui-Failghe, with his sons, and many others besides them."

This entry in the Annals of Ulster speaks the battle in 1115 mentioned above between Domnall Gerrlámhach (aka Domnall ua Briain) and Donnchad mac Murchada (aka Donnchad grandson of Mael na mBó):

- U1115.4 "A defeat was inflicted by Domnall ua Briain and the foreigners of Áth Cliath on the Laigin, and in it fell Donnchad grandson of Mael na mBó king of Uí Cheinnselaigh, and Conchobor ua Conchobuir, king of Uí Fhailgi, with their sons and many others besides."

== Ancestry ==
Ancestors of Domnall Gerrlámhach

16. Brian Bóruma mac Cennétig, High King of Ireland (died 1014)
8. Tadc mac Briain (died 1023)
17. Echrad ingen Carlusa
4. Toirdelbach Ua Briain, High King of Ireland (died 1086)
18. Gilla Brigte Ua Máel Muaid, King of Cenél Fiachach (died 1071)
9. Mór ingen Gilla Brigte
2. Muirchertach Ua Briain, High King of Ireland (died 1119)
20. Gilla Pátraic
10. Tadc mac Gilla Pátraic, King of Osraige
5. Derb Forgaill ingen Taidc (died 1098)
1. Domnall Gerrlámhach Ua Briain (died 1135)
6. Lethlobar Ua Laidcnén, King of Airgíalla
3. Derb Forgaill ingen Lethlobair
