= Donnchad mac Domnaill Remair =

- King of Leinster and Dublin
- Reign: 1086-1089
- Died: c. 1089
- Dynasty: Uí Cheinnselaig
- Father: Domnall Remar

Donnchad mac Domnaill Remair (died 1089), also known as Donnchadh mac Domhnall Reamhair, was a late-eleventh-century ruler of the kingdoms of Leinster and Dublin. He was a son of Domnall Remar mac Máel na mBó. Donnchad was slain in 1089.

== Life ==
In 1071, the Annals of the Four Masters reveal conflict amongst the Uí Cheinnselaig, as this source states that Donnchad fought his first cousin once removed, Domnall mac Murchada meic Diarmata.

The following year, in the immediate aftermath of the death of Donnchad's uncle, Diarmait mac Máel na mBó, King of Leinster, Toirdelbach Ua Briain, King of Munster overran Leinster, and attacked Dublin. There, in the coastal kingdom, he captured the sons of Domnall Remar, included Donnchad himself. If the Annals of Inisfallen are to be believed, the Dubliners then handed the kingship over to Toirdelbach. For a time Toirdelbach apparently tolerated Dublin to be ruled on his behalf by Gofraid mac Amlaíb meic Ragnaill, King of Dublin. However, in 1075 the former expulsed the latter once and for all. Toirdelbach then appointed Domnall to the kinship of Dublin, and allowed Leinster to be ruled by Donnchad. Unfortunately for Toirdelbach, however, Domnall died soon afterwards, and Toirdelbach replaced him with his own son, Muirchertach.

Donnchad seized control of Dublin in 1086, following the death of Toirdelbach, and proceeded to rule both Dublin and Leinster until 1089. In 1087, Muirchertach, now King of Munster, made moves to regain Uí Briain control of Dublin, and won a battle at Ráith Etair, north of the River Liffey. Two years later Muirchertach succeeded in gaining the town, as the Annals of the Four Masters records Donnchad's death at the hands of Conchobar Ua Conchobair Failge, King of Uí Failge. Muirchertach himself was unable to hold the town for long, losing it to Gofraid Crobán, King of the Isles about two years later.
