= Domnall mac Murchada (disambiguation) =

Domnall mac Murchada or Domhnall mac Murchada may refer to:

- Domhnall Caomhánach, (died 1175), king of Leinster
- Domnall mac Murchada, (died 1075), king of Leinster and Dublin
- Domnall Midi, (died 763), high king of Ireland
