= Battle of Móin Mhór =

12th century battle in Ireland

The Battle of Móin Mhór was fought in 1151 between the kingdoms of Leinster and Thomond in Ireland. The Kingdom of Leinster was victorious.

== Background ==
The entire Province of Munster was under the control of the O'Brien (Ua Briain) clan under the leadership of Toirrdelbach Ua Briain and his son Muirchertach from 1072-1114. Their capital was located in Limerick. In a bid to secure the High Kingship of Ireland for the clan, Muirchertach encouraged ecclesiastical reform in 1111 with the creation of territorial dioceses over the entire island. They had support for their bid from several foreign connections including the Norwegian king Magnus Bareleg and the Anglo-Norman baron Arnulf de Montgomery, who were both united to the clan through marriage in 1102. Their claim to the High Kingship was countered by the O'Neill (Uí Néill) clan in Ulster under the leadership of Domnall MacLochlainn of Ailech. Though Muirchertach campaigned hard in the north, he was unable to obtain submission. When he fell ill in 1114 he was deposed by his brother Diarmait. Muirchertach did briefly regain power of the clan but after his death in 1119 his brother's sons took control of the clan.

MacLochlainn's plans to restore the High Kingship to the north was thwarted by his ally Tairrdelbach Ua Conchobair of Connaght who formed an alliance with the O'Brien's. In 1118 Conchobair partitioned Munster between the sons of Diarmait and Tagh Mac Carthaig. The northern section of the province became the O'Brien Kingdom of Thomond and the southern became the Mac Cathaig Kingdom of Desmond.

== Battle ==
The forces of Ó Briain under the leadership of Toirdelbhach MacDiarmaida Ó Briain met the combined forces of Tairrdelbach Ua Conchobair and Diarmait Muirchertach. Conchobair and Muirchetach came to the aid of Mac Carthaig, the leading family of the Eóganacht Caisil dynasty. It was a disastrous defeat for the Ó Briain army with a loss of over 3,000 men and Toirdelbhach was forced to flee Munster. Although he was later restored, his power was greatly diminished.

== Aftermath ==
The defeat of the Ó Briain left a power vacuum that resulted in many changes. These changes are evident in the diocesan records from the Kells-Mellifont synod in 1152. In north Tipperary/south Offaly a see was established by the ancient kingdom of Éile. Similarly a church was established at Ardmore by the Déise Muman for their patron St Declan. The diocese of Ross was taken by the seafaring kingdom Corco Loígde. Attempts were also made to establish sees in Mungret and Inis Cathaig (Scatterly Island) but these were largely unsuccessful.
