= Donnchad mac Briain =

- King of Munster
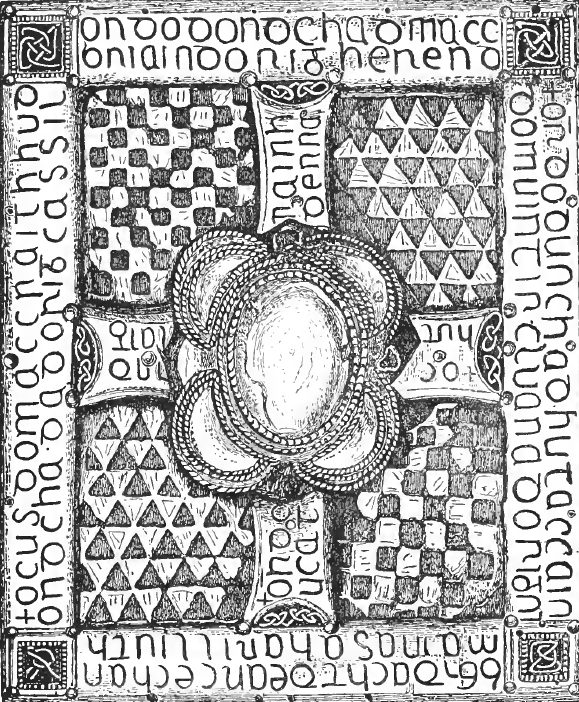
- Book shrine for the Stowe Missal; the top panel reads: Pray for Donnchad mac Brian, [Pray] for the King of Ireland
- Predecessor: Brian Bóruma
- Successor: Toirdelbach Ua Briain
- Died: 1064; Rome
- Burial: Santo Stefano al Monte Celio, Rome
- Wives: Cacht ingen Ragnaill; Driella of Wessex ?
- Issue: Lorcán, Murchad, Derbforgaill, others
- Dynasty: Dál gCais
- Father: Brian Bóruma
- Mother: Gormflaith ingen Murchada

Donnchadh mac Briain (old spelling: Donnchad mac Briain) (died 1064), son of Brian Bóruma and Gormflaith ingen Murchada, was King of Munster.

== Background ==
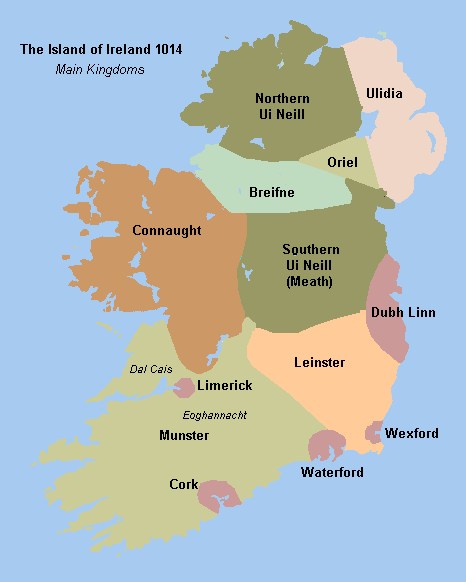
Regional overkingdoms and major kingdoms in Ireland, circa 1014 AD

Brian Bóruma was the first man to establish himself as High King of Ireland by force of arms alone in many centuries. Previous men reckoned High King had belonged to the great Uí Néill kindred, that large group of families who traced their descent from Niall of the Nine Hostages, which dominated much of central and northern Ireland from the 7th century onwards. No king from the south, where Brian's kindred, the hitherto rather obscure Dál gCais of the region of Thomond, had come close to dominating Ireland since the time of Feidlimid mac Crimthainn in the early 9th century, and none had been included in the more widely accepted lists of high kings in historic times. The last effective high king of Ireland from Munster was Cathal mac Finguine (d. 742), and likely before him the prehistoric Crimthann mac Fidaig.

Brian, building on his own resources, and those of the Viking towns of the south such as Limerick and Cork first took control of Munster, overthrowing the domination of the Eóganachta, a kindred which had dominated the kingship of Munster as effectively as the Uí Néill had dominated the High Kingship, and for just as long. With the Uí Néill disunited, and the resources of Munster, Brian first brought the Uí Néill High King Máel Sechnaill mac Domnaill to recognise him as an equal, and then as the master of Ireland. Brian met his death at the Battle of Clontarf on 23 April 1014, Good Friday, fighting against the King of Leinster and his allies. In myth and medieval pseudohistory this battle would become the last and greatest between the Irish and the Vikings and Brian the greatest of all Irish kings.

== Life ==
Donnchad was the son of Brian (king of Munster) and his wife Gormflaith (daughter of Murchad, king of Leinster). His year of birth is unknown, but a date in the 980s is likely, as it would accord with the political policy of his father at the time and mean that Donnchad was old enough to be militarily active in the 1010s, when he first appears in historical records. Brian's son Murchad, Donnchad's half-brother, died with his father at Clontarf. Another brother or half-brother, Domnall, had died in 1011. Two other half-brothers, Conchobar and Flann, are mentioned in some sources but leave no trace in the Irish annals. So, of Brian's sons, only Donnchad and his half-brother Tadc are known to have survived their father. According to Geoffrey Keating's account in Foras Feasa ar Éirinn, an account which is not backed by any annalistic evidence, Donnchad, leading the survivors of the Dál gCais back from Clontarf, faced down armies from Osraige and Munster.

The Munster king lists have Brian followed by Dúngal Ua Donnchada of the Cashel branch of the Eóganachta rather than by one of his sons. Dúngal did not die until 1025, at about the time that Donnchad started to make his presence felt outside Munster. His half-brother Tadc was assassinated in 1023—the Annals of Tigernach add that this was done on Donnchad's order—while he had himself lost his right hand in what may have been a failed assassination attempt in 1019.

== Reign ==
Beginning in the late 1050s, Donnchad came under attack from his neighbours. His nephew, Tadc's son Toirdelbach Ua Briain, may have been the force behind these attacks.

Donnchad's main rivals were Diarmait mac Maíl na mBó, King of Leinster from 1042, and Áed in Gaí Bernaig, King of Connacht from 1046. Diarmait in particular was a serious threat; allied with Niall mac Eochada, King of Ulster, he installed his son Murchad as ruler of Dublin in 1052, driving out Donnchad's brother-in-law and ally Echmarcach mac Ragnaill. Toirdelbach first joined with Áed in the early 1050s, raiding into Tuadmumu in 1052 and inflicting a heavy defeat on Donnchad's son Murchad in Corco Mruad, the north-west of modern County Clare in 1055. By 1058 Toirdelbach had gained Diarmait's support, for he was present when Diarmait, the Leinstermen and the Osraige drove Donnchad from Limerick, which he burned so that it would not fall into the hands of his enemies, and defeated him at Sliabh gCrot in the Galtee Mountains.

== Pilgrimage, death and legends ==
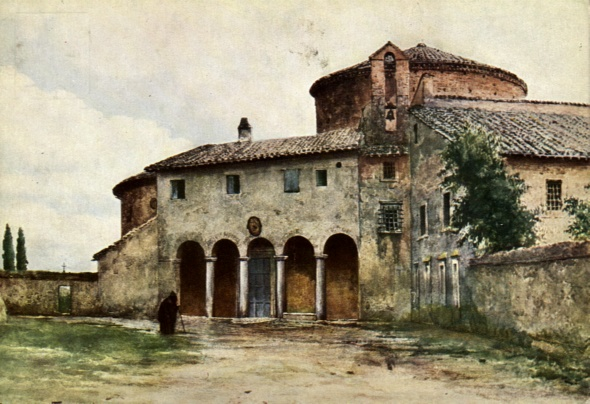
Santo Stefano on the Caelian Hill, painted by Ettore Roesler Franz

Donnchad was finally deposed in 1063 and went on pilgrimage to Rome. He died there the following year and was buried in the basilica of Santo Stefano al Monte Celio.

Geoffrey Keating's Foras Feasa ar Éirinn (Volume III, Chapter XXXIII) recounts that Donnchad granted the crown of Ireland to the Pope—Pope Urban II according to Keating, who places these events in 1092—and asked for papal aid to return him to power. This story is repeated in many 19th century and earlier works of popular history and is given as an explanation of how the English Pope Adrian IV came to issue the papal bull Laudabiliter granting rule of Ireland to King Henry II of England. Elsewhere (Volume III, Chapter XXVII) Keating is more skeptical regarding other stories associated with Donnchad's time in Rome. He disbelieves claims that Donnchad took up with a daughter of a Holy Roman Emperor and had at least two sons from whom some later Old English families were descended. Keating writes that "this story cannot be true, for before setting out on that expedition [Donnchad] was a very old decrepit man of over eighty years of age, and it is not likely that an emperor's daughter would covet intercourse with such a veteran".

Domnall's descendants were excluded from the succession in Munster. His grandsons Conchobhar and Cennétig, sons of Lorcan, became kings of Tulach Óc in east Tyrone and operated against their cousins in the 1070s and 1080s.

== In fiction ==
- In Morgan Llywelyn's novel Pride of Lions (1996), Donnchad mac Briain is the main protagonist. It deals with the aftermath of Brian Boru's death and is the sequel to Lion of Ireland, the story of Brian Boru, High King of Ireland.
