= Donnchadh mac Murchada =

Irish king (1065–1115)

Donnchad mac Murchada (aka 'Donnchadh Ua Mael-na-mbo' and 'Donnchad grandson of Mael na mBó'; Leinster, 1065 - 8 December 1115) was a King of Leinster and Dublin from 1098 until 1115.

== Family ==
He was the third son of Murchad mac Diarmuid, King of Leinster, and Sadb MacBricc.

== Marriage and issue ==
He married an unknown wife and Orlaith ingen O'Braenain (Dublin, 1090-?), daughter of Gilla Michil Cinaed O'Braenain (Dublin, 1053-?) and wife (1078) Uchdelb O'Gairbita (1058-?), daughter of Cearnachen O'Gairbita (1040-?), King of Uí Feilmeda (Ban Senchus 193, 198, 231.), and had two sons by first marriage, Enna Mac Murchada (?-1126), King of Leinster in 1117 (some lineages do not show Enna as in line), and Murchad Mac Murchada (?-1172), King of Osraige between 1123 and 1126, deposed, and one son by second marriage, Diarmait Mac Murchada, King of Leinster.

== Death ==
He died in battle while fighting Domnall Gerrlámhach, the King of Dublin, and the Danes. A near contemporary account by Gerald of Wales, suggests that the King of Dublin lured him to Dublin under false pretence of peace, killed him and then buried him with a dog as an insult. "A battle was gained by Domhnall mac Briain and the foreigners of Ath-cliath over the Leinstermen, wherein fell Donnchadh mac Mael-na-mbo, lord of Ui-Ceinnsealaigh, and Conchobhair mac Conchobhair, lord of Ui-Failghe, with his sons, and many others besides them." [Annals of the Four Masters, Vol 2. p. 1001]

== Primary source data ==
This entry in "The Conquest of Ireland" was written by Gerald of Wales, who was appointed Archdeacon of Brecon in 1174, though whose work on Ireland is widely dismissed for his poor sources and overt attempts to paint the Irish as uncivilized and barbaric:

- "Dermitius (Diarmaid mac Murchadha) had a mortal hatred for the citizens of Dublin, and not without reason; for they had murdered his father (Donnchadh mac Murchada), while sitting in the hall of the house of one of the chief men, which he used for his court of justice; and they added insult to the foul deed by burying his corpse with a dog."

This entry in the Annals of the Four Masters speaks the battle of 1115 between Domnall Gerrlámhach (aka Domhnall Ua Briain) and Donnchad mac Murchada (aka Donnchadh Ua Mael-na-mbo):

- M1115.5 "A battle was gained by Domhnall Ua Briain and the foreigners of Ath-cliath over the Leinstermen, wherein fell Donnchadh Ua Mael-na-mbo, lord of Ui-Ceinnsealaigh, and Conchobhair Ua Conchobhair, lord of Ui-Failghe, with his sons, and many others besides them."

This entry in The Annals of Ulster speaks of the battle in 1115 mentioned above between Domnall Gerrlámhach (aka Domnall ua Briain) and Donnchad mac Murchada (aka Donnchad grandson of Mael na mBó):

- U1115.4 "A defeat was inflicted by Domnall ua Briain and the foreigners of Áth Cliath on the Laigin, and in it fell Donnchad grandson of Mael na mBó king of Uí Cheinnselaigh, and Conchobor ua Conchobuir, king of Uí Fhailgi, with their sons and many others besides."
