= Toirdelbach Ua Briain =

High King of Ireland

Toirdhealbhach ua Briain (old spelling: Toirdelbach ua Briain), anglicised Turlough O'Brien (1009 – 14 July 1086), was King of Munster and effectively High King of Ireland. A grandson of Brian Bóruma, Toirdelbach was the son of Tadc mac Briain who was killed in 1023 by his half-brother Donnchad mac Briain.

For the first forty years of his life nothing is known of Toirdelbach. It was not until the 1050s that he found allies in Connacht and in Leinster, particularly the powerful King of Leinster Diarmait mac Maíl na mBó, who would aid his claims to be ruler of Munster. It took perhaps ten years of sustained attack to remove his uncle Donnchad from power, and send him into exile, and to place Toirdelbach in power in Munster as Diarmait's faithful ally.

On Diarmait's death Toirdelbach took over the reins of power, establishing himself as ruler of more than half of Ireland. While not a great military leader, he was a capable politician whose influence extended as far north as Ulaid and who made and unmade Kings of Connacht. He died after more than two decades in power, following a lengthy illness, still in control of events. Both his son, Muirchertach Ua Briain, and grandson, Toirdelbach Ua Conchobair, would go on to be influential Irish kings.

== Family quarrels ==
Toirdelbach was the son of Tadc mac Briain, son of Brian Bóruma, and Mór, daughter of Gilla Brigte Ua Maíl Muaid of Cenél Fiachach. His father was killed in 1023, probably on the orders of his half-brother Donnchad mac Briain who thereby made himself king of Munster. Donnchad, while he successfully retained control of Munster for four decades, was never able to achieve the same success as Brian. Epigraphic evidence shows that he aimed to be king of Ireland, and perhaps considered himself to be such, but the annalists and later historians recognised no such pretensions.

As for Toirdelbach, the annals record nothing of him until the 1050s, at which time he was seeking, and finding, outside assistance against his uncle. Donnchad's main rivals were Diarmait mac Maíl na mBó, King of Leinster from 1042, and Áed in Gaí Bernaig, King of Connacht from 1046. Diarmait in particular was a serious threat; allied with Niall mac Eochada, King of Ulster, he installed his son Murchad as ruler of Dublin in 1052, driving out Donnchad's brother-in-law and ally Echmarcach mac Ragnaill. From the beginning of the 1050s onwards, Donnchad came under sustained attack from both Áed and Diarmait. Toirdelbach first joined with Áed in the early 1050s, raiding into Tuadmumu in 1052 and inflicting a heavy defeat on Donnchad's son Murchad in Corco Mruad, the north-west of modern County Clare in 1055. By 1058 Toirdelbach had gained Diarmait's support, for he was present when Diarmait, the Leinstermen and the Osraige drove Donnchad from Limerick, which he burned so that it would not fall into the hands of his enemies, and defeated him at Sliabh gCrot in the Galtee Mountains.

In 1060 Donnchad attempted to divide his enemies by submitting to Áed. This was unsuccessful as Áed attacked again in 1061, razing the Dál gCais fortress at Kincora and burning their church at Killaloe. Injury was added to insult when Diarmait brought an army, and Toirdelbach in his train, to Munster in 1062. Donnchad's son Murchad led the unsuccessful resistance, and even when Diarmait returned to Leinster, Toirdelbach defeated his kinsmen. By 1063, Donnchad was beaten. Deposed, he went on pilgrimage to Rome where he died the following year. Diarmait installed Toirdelbach as a puppet king in Munster.

== Diarmait mac Maíl na mBó ==
Following Donnchad's deposition, Toirdelbach was one of Diarmait's key allies, particularly in Diarmait's final years when his authority was challenged within Leinster. In 1066 Diarmait and Toirdelbach each paid 30 ounces of gold to the king of Ciarraige Luachra of West Munster for his help in assassinating their enemies. In 1067 they campaigned together to defeat and kill the king of Ciarraige Luachra. Toirdelbach's nephew Murchad son of Donnchad was killed in 1068 while raiding in the midlands.

The Annals of Innisfallen record Toirdelbach as a lawmaker, reporting that in 1068: "A law and ordinance was made by Tairdelbach Ua Briain-and no better law was enacted in Mumu for a long time—with the result that neither cow nor horse was housed [at night] but allowed to wander at will." In the same year, and perhaps related to this law-making, Máel Ísu mac Amalgada, comarba Pátraic or abbot of Armagh and successor of Saint Patrick, visited Munster for the first time and received "his full visitation, both in tribute and offerings".

Toirdelbach's ally and protector Diarmait mac Maíl na mBó faced increasing difficulties in his final years, difficulties which led Toirdelbach to intervene on Diarmait's behalf against his enemies in Leinster. Diarmait's sons Murchad and Glúniairn died in 1070, leaving the succession uncertain and disputed. Later in 1070 Toirdelbach took an army into Leinster, carrying off hostages, and receiving the submission of the king of Osraige. Toirdelbach had to return to Leinster again in 1071, when open warfare broke out between Diarmait's grandson Domnall, Murchad's son, and his nephew Donnchad, son of Domnall Remair. The annal states that the hostages Toirdelbach took were handed over into the keeping of Diarmait mac Maíl na mBó. Toirdelbach was not idle on his own account in these years. He led an army on a raid into the midlands in 1071, and had his soldiers build wooden bridges across the Shannon, evidently for military purposes, at Áth Caille (perhaps modern O'Briensbridge) and Killaloe.

Diarmait visited Munster in 1071, distributing gifts. Diarmait had earlier given Toirdelbach treasures which included Brian Bóruma's sword, and "the standard of the king of the Saxons". This was among Diarmait's last recorded acts before his death in battle on 7 February 1072.

Toirdelbach was the chief beneficiary of Diarmait's death, the Annals of Innisfallen recording that:

Toirdelbach Ua Briain went to Osraige and Leinster, burned Uí Cheinnselaig and brought away much booty and cows, and took hostages from it as well as from Leinster. And the foreigners gave him the kingship of Dublin, and he made prisoner the sons of Domnall, son of Máel na mBó, in Dublin, and brought back the hostages of Osraige on that occasion.

Conchobar Ua Máel Shechnaill, king of Mide, was murdered the next year, and Toirdelbach took advantage of this to ravage the midlands, followed by an expedition to Connacht where he obtained hostages from both the Uí Conchobair and the Uí Ruairc. He divided Leinster between various rivals, a policy of divide and rule which would serve him well. In Dublin he installed one Gofraid mac Amlaíb meic Ragnaill, perhaps a kinsman of Echmarcach, as his client king.

A campaign in 1075 directed against the Uí Néill and their allies in the north turned out less well. Toirdelbach's son Muirchertach was defeated by the Airgíalla near Áth Fhirdia (modern Ardee, County Louth) with heavy loss. At more or less the same time Gofraid was banished from Dublin by Toirdelbach, seemingly replaced by Domnall son of Murchad son of Diarmait mac Maíl na mBó, who ruled for only a short time before he died, and was replaced by Toirdelbach's son Muirchertach. With Muirchertach securely installed in Dublin, and another son, Diarmait, ruling over Waterford, Toirdelbach was master of half of Ireland.

== The wider world ==
While Toirdelbach's son Diarmait, ruler of Waterford, raided Wales in 1080, in general Toirdelbach is seen as less interested in matters outside Ireland than his protector Diarmait mac Maíl na mBó, or his son Muirchertach.

It was during Gofraid's short reign over Dublin, on 6 May 1074, that Donatus, first archbishop of Dublin died. This led the archbishop of Canterbury, Lanfranc of Pavia, to take an interest in Irish matters. Lanfranc, basing himself, he said, on Bede's writings, had already assured Pope Alexander II that Dublin formed part of the province of Canterbury and that it was for him to consecrate the new bishop. He also wrote to the Irish kings concerned, being careful not to cause offence. His letter to Toirdelbach calls him "magnificent king of Ireland", a title which might seem the more impressive had Lanfranc not also addressed Gofraid of Dublin as "glorious king of Ireland".

The Annals of Innisfallen report that "five Jews came from over sea with gifts to Toirdelbach, and they were sent back again over sea". The meaning and significance of this event is unclear. Hudson remarks that "[i]f the delegation wanted [Toirdelbach]'s approval for settling in Ireland they were disappointed". Bracken suggests that if this was the intention of the delegation, the otherwise astute Toirdelbach missed a significant opportunity to strengthen his position.

== Divide and rule ==
Toirdelbach employed the policy of divide and rule to maintain control of Leinster and to prevent the emergence of a rival in Connacht. In the north, he supported the Ulaid to weaken the Cenél nEógain kings of Ailech. This policy was successful in keeping Leinster pacified, but was less successful in dealing with the Cenél nEógain of the north and the kings of Connacht in the west.

The Cenél nEógain, who appear to have had no widely accepted candidates for the kingship, hit upon a candidate in the person of Conchobar Ua Briain, grandson of Toirdelbach's uncle Donnchad mac Briain and Toirdelbach's most obvious rival for the kingship of Munster. Conchobar was king for only a short time when he was murdered, along with his wife, which resulted in the killer put put to death. His brother Cennétig was chosen to succeed him.

In Connacht, three rival branches of the Uí Briúin, the Ua Conchobair, the Ua Flaithbertaig, and the Ua Ruairc, were in competition. Ruaidrí na Saide Buide of the Ua Conchobair was king of Connacht when he submitted to Toirdelbach in 1076. Toirdelbach deposed Ruaidrí in 1079 and replaced him with an Ua Ruairc, Áed son of Art Uallach.

The Ua Ruairc proved to be a threat to Toirdelbach and to their neighbours. Máel Sechnaill, king of Mide, submitted to Toirdelbach in 1080, perhaps for fear of Ua Ruairc. War broke out in 1084 between Toirdelbach and the Ua Ruairc, joined by Cennétig Ua Briain. Toirdelbach raided Mide, but while he was absent the Conmaicne, clients of the Ua Ruairc, raided Munster. A battle was fought at Monecronock, near modern Leixlip, on 19 October 1082 where Toirdelbach's sons Muirchertach and Tadc won, killing Domnall Ua Ruairc and Cennétig Ua Briain.

== Death ==
Toirdelbach fell seriously ill in 1085 and lost his hair. The Annals of the Four Masters, a late and not always reliable source, state that he had been ill for many years. He may never have fully recovered from his earlier illness. The Annals of Ulster report that he "died in Kincora [near Killaloe] after great suffering and long repentance, and after receiving the Body of Christ and His Blood, on [14 July] in the seventy-seventh year of his age [1086]". Rarely given to over-praising southern kings, this northern annal calls him "king of Ireland". The Annals of Tigernach, another northern record, styles Toirdelbach rí urmóir Erenn, "king of the greater part of Ireland".

== Marriages ==
Toirdelbach was probably married three times. Dubchoblaig of the Uí Cheinnselaig, who died in 1088, was the mother of Diarmait, perhaps named for her kinsman and Toirdelbach's protector Diarmait mac Maíl na mBó. Derbforgaill of Osraige was the mother of Tadc and Muirchertach. No children of Gormlaith of Ua Fógarta are named and the mother of Toirdelbach's daughter Mór is not recorded.

Mór married Ruaidrí na Saide Buide. Her son Toirdelbach Ua Conchobair was one of the greatest kings of medieval Ireland. She died in 1088, perhaps coincidentally the year in which a gloss to the Annals of Ulster records Toirdelbach's birth. Toirdelbach apparently planned to divide his lands between his three sons. Tadc survived him by only weeks, dying of natural causes at Kincora, after which Muircheartach and Diarmait disputed the succession. Diarmait was the loser, banished by his half-brother, and exiled with his mother's kin in Leinster.
