= Tadc mac Briain =

Irish noble (died 1023)

Tadc mac Briain (died 1023) was the son of Brian Boru and Echrad, daughter of Carlus mac Ailella of Uí Áeda Odba. Tadc had one son, Toirdelbach Ua Briain (Turlough O'Brien), with his wife Mór, daughter of Gilla Brigte Ua Maíl Muaid of Cenél Fiachach.

After Brian Boru's death at the battle of Clontarf in 1014, Tadc was a serious contender to the kingship of Munster, rivalling his half brother Donnchad mac Briain. Tadc was assassinated at the instigation of Donnchad in 1023.
