= Niall mac Eochada =

Niall mac Eochada (died 1063), was king of Ulaid from 1016.

His father, Eochada mac Ardgair, died in 1004. His early military ventures were against members of his own sept, Dál Fiatach. He defeated a cousin in 1012 at the ‘battle of the Summits’ and in 1020 defeated and blinded Flaithbertach Ua Eochada.

In 1022 he defeated the Dublin Norse at sea. He then defeated the Cenél nEógain client kingdom of Airgialla. In 1024 he invaded Dublin and took hostages; a success he repeated two years later.

In 1044 mac Eochada raided the southern Uí Néill kingdom of Brega, but was defeated, losing 200 men.

In 1047 he made an alliance with Diarmait mac Maíl na mBó which helped to put pressure, from both north and south, on the kingdoms of Mide, Brega and Dublin

In 1056 the southern Uí Néill took 3,000 cows and 60 captives from his client Kingdom Dál nAraidi which was also raided by the Cenél nEógain in 1059.

Niall's son Eochaid (died 1062) was considered co-king of Ulaid with his father. Eochaid's son Donn Sléibe Ua hEochada (died 1091) was also a king of Ulaid, as were many of his descendants.
