= Cacht ingen Ragnaill =

- Queen of Ireland
- Reign: 1032–1054
- Spouse: Donnchad mac Briain

Cacht ingen Ragnaill was the queen of Donnchad mac Briain, from their marriage in 1032 to her death in 1054, when she is styled Queen of Ireland in the Irish annals of the Clonmacnoise group: the Annals of Tigernach and Chronicon Scotorum. Her husband himself, though King of Munster, is not widely regarded as having been High King of Ireland and so the extent of Cacht's influence is uncertain. That her style is superior to his presents an obviously strange situation in medieval Gaelic Ireland's male-dominated politics.

Of Norse-Irish descent, Cacht almost certainly belonged to the dynasty of the Uí Ímair, and is usually assumed to have been a sister of Donnchad's ally Echmarcach mac Ragnaill, whose precise parentage is uncertain. He is regarded by scholars either as a descendant of Ivar of Waterford, or of Gofraid mac Arailt, but since both had children named Ragnall and both dynasties were in alliance with the Dál Cais, Cacht's father need not be identical with his.
