= Muirchertach Ua Briain =

- King of Munster and High King of Ireland
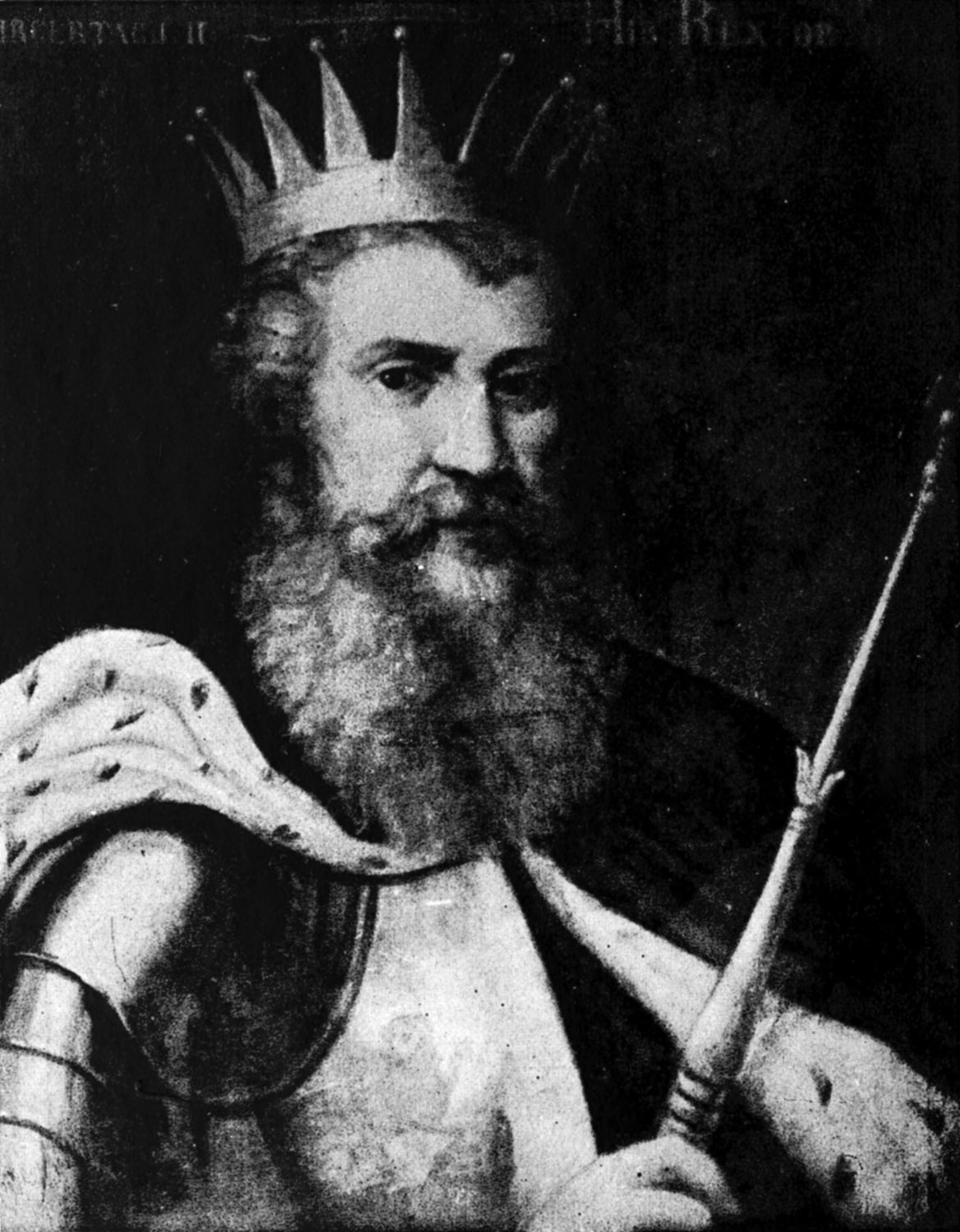
- Fanciful depiction
- Reign: c. 1075 – 1086
- Predecessor: Toirdelbach Ua Briain
- Successor: Tairrdelbach Ua Conchobair
- Born: c. 1050
- Died: 1119
- Issue: Mathgamain; Domnall; Bjaðmunjo; Lafracoth
- House: Uí Briain
- Father: Toirdelbach Ua Briain
- Mother: Derbforgaill, daughter of Tadhg Mac Giolla Pádraig of Osraige

Muirchertach Ua Briain (anglicised as Murtaugh O'Brien; c. 1050 – c. 10 March 1119, son of Toirdelbach Ua Briain and great-grandson of Brian Boru, was King of Munster and later self-declared High King of Ireland.

== Background and early career ==
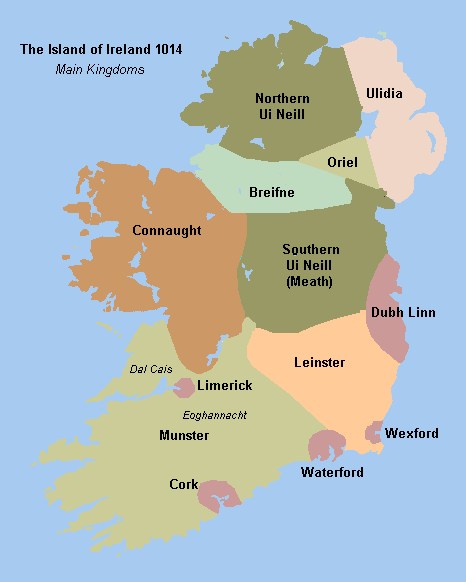
Major political divisions of Ireland similar to those in Muirchertach's time

Muirchertach Ua Briain was a son of Toirdelbach Ua Briain, the previous Dalcassian King of Munster and de facto High King of Ireland. As a descendant of Brian Boru, he was part of the powerful O'Brien dynasty who ruled Ireland at the time. His mother was Derbforgaill, daughter of Tadhg Mac Giolla Pádraig of Osraige, who also bore Muirchertach's brother Tadhg.

His early life is largely unknown. The Annals of Tigernach give his birth date as 1050. Afterwards, he is not mentioned in any of the annals of Ireland until the year 1075 when he was defeated by the Kingdom of Airgíalla in battle near modern Ardee in County Louth, taking heavy losses. This was part of a series of campaigns undertaken by his father Toirdelbach against rebellious lesser kings in the north of the country. He was later appointed as king or governor of the city-state of Dublin by his father.

== Governor of Dublin ==
Background: Importance of Dublin

Despite the victory of Muirchertach's great-grandfather Brian Boru over the Vikings at the Battle of Clontarf in 1014 and the breaking of Norse power in Ireland, Dublin remained under the rule of Norse–Gael kings and had links with other Viking Kingdoms. They paid tribute to their Irish overlords, but otherwise the Irish rarely interfered, mainly because of the trade the Norse brought to the area.

However, in 1052, the King of Dublin, Echmarchach mac Ragnaill, was removed by the King of Laigin (Leinster), Diarmuit mac Maíl ma mBó. Echmarchach was replaced by Diarmuit's son, Murchad. As a prince of Leinster, Murchad acted as a sort of governor of the city on behalf of his father, the King. Diarmuit seemed to appreciate the importance of Dublin which, even back then, was recognised as a sort of national capital city and was important for a number of reasons, including trade and its military forces, particularly its navy.

Appointment of Muirchertach

Following the death of the King of Leinster in the year 1075, Dublin came under the control of Muirchertach's father, Toirdelbach mac Tadhg Ua Briain, King of Munster and High King of Ireland, as he expanded his power throughout Ireland. Toirdelbach at first appointed Godfraid mac Ragnaill as king but he was later expelled by Toirdelbhach. He then placed a man by the name of Domnall as governor but he was himself replaced by Muirchertach later that same year after the former's sudden death. This was probably Muirchertach's first major political appointment as it was in this year that he was first mentioned in the Annals of Tigernach, signifying the power and the importance of the position he held.

As governor, he would have had frequent contact with the Archbishop of Dublin, Patrick. Patrick had previously held various positions within the Catholic Church in England and would have been very familiar with the politics of England following the Norman Conquest in 1066. Patrick possibly influenced Muirchertach's great interest in affairs outside Ireland later in his career.

On 19 October 1084, Muirchertach led a large army consisting of the armies of the Kingdoms of Dublin, Leinster, Osraige and Munster against the forces of Donchad ua Ruairc of Breifne, in a battle at Moin Croinnioce, near modern Leixlip in County Kildare. Over 4,000 men were killed in the battle, with Muirchertach heavily defeating the forces of Ua Ruairc. After the battle, Muirchertach cut off Ua Ruairc's head and brought it to his father's palace in Kincora.

== King of Munster ==
In 1086, following the death of his father Toirdelbach, Muirchertach claimed the Kingship of Munster. Initially, Toirdelbach had divided the Kingdom among his three sons Muirchertach, Diarmuit and Tadc. However, Tadc died the following year and Muirchertach banished Diarmuit, claiming the entire province for himself. Diarmuit, however, was evidently not going to let Muirchertach take the Kingship so easily and made an alliance with the King of Leinster. The forces of Diarmuit and Leinster met with the forces of Muirchertach at Raith Etair, possibly the promontory fort on Howth Head in northern County Dublin. The forces of Muirchertach were victorious, and Muirchertach's claim to the Kingship was no longer under any threat.

In 1088, Muirchertach led a number of naval campaigns against Ruadhrí na Saide Buide Ua Conchobhair, King of Connacht. The first fleet sailed up the River Shannon as far as Clonfert, but the crews were slaughtered by the Connachtmen. Another fleet was sent around the western coast of Ireland on the Atlantic Ocean, but this fleet was also defeated by the forces of Connacht. Ruadhrí then attacked Munster when he invaded northern County Clare, near the homeland of the Dál gCáis.

However, a new rival emerged in the form of Domnall Mac Lochlainn, King of the Northern Uí Néill, who later in 1088 invaded Connacht and successfully gained the submission of Ruadhrí na Saide. Ruadhrí and Domnall formed an alliance and together they attacked Munster. At the time, Muirchertach was away campaigning in Leinster. They burned and looted Limerick, Killaloe and Emly, and took over 160 hostages. Muirchertach was forced to buy back these hostages with gold, silver, cattle and meat.

According to a source from Munster, Muirchertach avenged himself by attacking the Kingdoms of Meath and Leinster, the latter presumably having fallen into enemy hands since the time Muirchertach had been governor of Dublin. He gained the submission of both provinces, killing the King of Leinster in the process. He also fought around Dublin, burning a building in Lusk, County Dublin killing over 160 people inside. He then headed west and cut down the sacred inaugural tree of the Kings of Connacht. Muirchertach was involved in further naval actions against Connacht the next year in 1089 when he was looting islands in Lough Ree, but Ruadhrí na Saide blocked the path home on the River Shannon around the settlement of Clonmacnaoise, forcing Muirchertach to hand over his ships to the forces of the Kingdom of Meath after retreating to Athlone. He marched with his army back home to Munster on foot, but using Muirchertach's confiscated ships, the Meathmen and Connachtmen sailed southward on the Shannon and plundered the plains around Cashel.

Four kings now battled for supremacy in Ireland: Muirchertach Ua Briain of the Kingdom of Munster, Domnall Ua Maél Sechnaill of the Kingdom of Mide, Ruadhrí na Saide Buide Ua Conchobhair of the Kingdom of Connacht, and Domnall Mac Lochlainn of the Northern Uí Néill. The four kings met in 1090, where Mac Lochlainn was acknowledged as High King of Ireland and he received hostages from the other three kings. Following this conference, Muirchertach went on campaign in Leinster again, but while he was away, Munster was attacked by Ua Maél Sechnaill who was joined by Ruadhrí na Saide. Although he was defeated by the Meath forces, he was able to drive the armies of Connacht back, and then received assistance from Mac Lochlainn in the north in defeating Ua Maél Sechnaill.

Ruadhrí na Saide again invaded Munster two years later in 1091, but he was blinded the following year in 1092 by Flaithbertaigh Ua Flaithbertaigh, throwing the Kingdom of Connacht into a state of political turmoil. Muirchertach took advantage of this situation by invading the province and gaining the kingship, in the process possibly taking in and grooming his nephew Tairrdelbach Ua Conchobhair for the day he would become king of Connacht. These events left Muirchertach in the south and Mac Lochlainn in the north the most powerful kings in Ireland. He continued expanding his power with further campaigns in Mide, more or less gaining the overlordship of the region, and he reconciled with his brother Diarmuit at Cashel in 1093.

== King of Ireland ==
In 1094, Muirchertach fought the kings of Leth Cuinn and Gofraid Crobán, King of Dublin and the Isles. He went with his army to Dublin and banished Gofraid, and brought about the killing of Domnall Ua Maíl Shechnaill. He asserted supremacy over the Southern Uí Néill of the Kingdom of Meath, dividing the province between two rival clans, applying a policy of divide and rule, which had been used very effectively by his father before him.

The Irish Sea and Magnus Barefoot

Since the Kingdom of Dublin had fallen to the Irish of Leinster in the year 1052, Irish influence in the Irish Sea, particularly the Kingdom of Man and the Isles, had greatly increased. Diarmuit mac Maíl na mBó, King of Leinster and High King of Ireland, was also King of the Isles through capturing Dublin as Dublin was part of this Kingdom. Having ousted the Norse–Gael king, he was in a very powerful position. After Diarmuit's death, Muirchertach's father, Toirdelbach, became High King of Ireland and had control of Dublin. He was involved in the Isle of Man as well, more or less controlling the island, possibly through one his sons, Tadc, brother of Muirchertach, marrying a woman from the Manx royalty.

Upon Toirdelbhach's death and the accession of Muirchertach to the throne, the Manx may have used the opportunity to assert some form of independence from Irish rule, lasting until 1095, when Muirchertach was able to assert control, again through a political marriage into Manx Royalty, who had requested a king from the Irish royal bloodline. This time, the alliance was made through his nephew Diarmuit, Tadc's son, who married a Manx princess. By gaining overlordship of the Isles, Muirchertach was able to access the manpower and large naval fleets of the Isles, and he had a base from which to launch assaults on Ulster in the Hebrides, which would prove useful in his war against Domnall Ua Lochlainn.

However, this attracted the attention of the King of Norway, Magnus III, better known as Magnus Barefoot, who wanted to retain Norwegian power in the area and bring the Norse Kingdoms such as Orkney, the Isles and Dublin. With a fleet of around sixty ships and several thousand men, he re-established Norse power in the area, garrisoning the islands of Orkney and Man. Although some sources say he did want to conquer Ireland, there was not much contact between the Norwegians and the Irish, apart from an incident when three Norwegian ships were sunk by the Ulaid (who were under Muirchertach's overlordship), probably while cattle raiding in the area. Some sources do say Magnus planned a full assault on Ireland, but the Irish gathered a large army on the coast, and Magnus did not attack.

Earlier, Muirchertach had sent a fleet to Wales to help the Welsh fight the Normans who were encroaching on their territory on the island of Anglesey. However, the Normans were able to buy off the Irish ships to their side, and the Welsh were defeated. The Norman victory celebrations were interrupted by Magnus, however, who landed and routed the Norman army, reputedly shooting Hugh de Montgomery, brother of Arnulf, through the eye. Later, when the Irish fleet returned home, they were punished by Muirchertach for their treachery. After this event, Anglesey was considered the southernmost point of the Kingdom of Norway. After these campaigns, Magnus went home to Norway to campaign against Sweden, but he would return later.

In 1101, Muirchertach declared himself High King and travelled the island provinces. He is first named as High King in the Annals of Tigernach in this year. It was in this year that he gave the fortress on the rock of Cashel to the Church. He commissioned the piece of propaganda, Cogad Gaédal re Galliab, "the War of the Irish with the Foreigners" between 1103 and 1113. The work was intended to romanticize the accounts from the annals, in a bid by Muirchertach to secure the O'Brien Dynasty's claim to the High Kingship, in a time when the throne was fiercely contested by the Northern Uí Néill in Ulster and later, the Ua Conchobhairs of Connacht.

An Sligeadh Timcheall

In 1101, officially High King of Ireland and with the Church on his side, Muirchertach planned his largest and most ambitious campaign yet, called An Sligeadh Timcheall ("The Circular Hosting"). He gathered the armies of the various kingdoms, save those of Ulster, and marched northwards. The six-week long campaign began with his army marching north to the River Erne at Assaroe, then to the Inis Eoin Peninsula, burning Ardstraw and Fahan on the way. The offensive culminated with the destruction of Grianan an Aileach, an important fort of the Northern Uí Néill, in revenge for Ua Lochlainn's earlier burning of towns in Munster. Muirchertach famously ordered his men to bring back one stone from the walls of the fort for every sack of provisions they had. They marched home to Munster along the ancient route of Slige Midluachra.

For the first time during his reign, he had successfully subdued the Ulaid. The Northern Uí Néill had been severely weakened, but did not capitulate. Muirchertach would lead several campaigns against Ua Lochlainn over the next few years, but was unable to gain their submission, with the campaign almost always ending in stalemate in southern County Armagh. With the Ulaid now under his control, however, he had another angle from which to attack the Uí Néill from in the Northeast, and easier access to the Hebrides and other areas of the Isles, and parts of Scotland.

== Campaigns in the North and Second War in the Irish Sea ==
Like many of the High Kings of Ireland from the South had found, including Muirchertach's great-grandfather Brian Boru, the last place to recognise their authority was Ulster, namely the Kingdoms of Ulaid and the Northern Uí Néill. At the turn of the century, Muirchertach led annual campaigns against Domhnall Ua Lochlainn and the other northern kings, with mixed success. Muirchertach's armies consisted of soldiers from every Irish Kingdom apart from Ulster. The fighting was often heavily concentrated in what is now modern southern County Armagh, but Muirchertach would often be halted by the intervention of the comrade Patraic, the abbot of Armagh, who would organise truces between the two kings.

Muirchertach attempted a campaign against the Cenél Chonaill, with naval support from the fleet of Dublin, but he was forced to retreat following the destruction of the Dublin fleet. Around the same time, Muirchertach was also under threat from Magnus Barefoot of Norway, who had returned with a larger force than his first Irish Sea campaign, possibly with the intention of invading Ireland. Magnus had earlier raided Inis Cathaigh (Scattery Island) at the Shannon estuary in 1101, possibly testing the situation and defenses of Ireland.

Magnus agreed to provide military support for the High King in his war against the men of Ulster. They forged an alliance, cemented by the marriage of Muirchertach's daughter, Bjaðmunjo, to Magnus's son, Sigurd. The treaty also saved Ireland from Norse raids, but the Irish lost most of their control in the Isles to the Norwegians. Muirchertach also recognised Norwegian control over Dublin and Fingal, with the western lands of the Kingdom of Norway under the control of Sigurd, who was announced as co-king alongside Magnus on the day of his wedding.

Muirchertach and Magnus campaigned together in Ulster throughout late 1102 and early the next year. Contrary to the Norse sagas, the Irish Annals describe the campaigns as largely unsuccessful. Norse sources say Magnus spent the winter in the High King's palace at Kincora in Killaloe with Muirchertach, but it is also possible that he wintered in Dublin. In the summer of 1103, Muirchertach launched an offensive against Domnall Ua Lochlainn, but was defeated on 5 August at the Battle of Mag Coba. After this, with enemies to the north and Magnus threatening his throne, it is possible Muirchertach wanted Magnus out of the way.

There is confusion surrounding the death of Magnus. Norwegian sources say Muirchertach was supposed to bring Magnus provisions for his return to Norway. When Muirchertach did not show up at the agreed time, Magnus became suspicious the Irish were going to attack. On 24 August 1103, St. Bartholomew's Day—or the day before, according to one source—Magnus gathered his army and landed on the coast of northeastern Ireland. It is possible he made an incautious cattle raid, and the Ulaid mistook the Norwegians for cattle-raiding Hebrideans. Alternatively, it is possible that Muirchertach ordered the Ulaid to bring Magnus supplies, but the Ulaid took this is an order to ambush him. It is also possible that powerful men in Norway wanted Magnus removed from the throne, and bribed a contingent of his forces to desert back to their ships during the battle. As Magnus landed on the shore, a large Irish force emerged from the thick bush. In the ensuing battle, Magnus was killed, and the Norwegian force was destroyed.

Afterwards, Sigurd returned home to Norway without his bride. Norwegian influence remained in the area, but no Norwegian king would set foot in the region for another 150 years after the death of Magnus, which was during the Scottish–Norwegian War of 1266.

== The de Belleme family and England ==
Following the death of William II of England in the year 1100, the throne was seized by Henry I of England. However, the crown was also claimed by William's older brother, Robert, the Duke of Normandy. Some of Robert's supporters included the de Belleme family, "one of the most powerful non-royal families in Europe." Robert de Belleme was Duke of Shrewsbury, and his brother Arnulf was Earl of Pembroke.

Robert of Normandy invaded the Kingdom of England to secure the throne, but he and Henry quickly came to an agreement before there was any major bloodshed. But Henry turned against Robert's supporters, namely the two de Belleme brothers. Robert de Belleme sought assistance from the Welsh and from Magnus Barefoot, but received none from the latter (matters were complicated as Magnus had killed Robert's brother, Hugh, which Magnus apparently later regretted).

Arnulf meanwhile sought assistance from Muirchertach. Arnulf sent his steward, Gerald of Windsor, to negotiate with the High King. As part of their agreement, Arnulf was to marry Muirchertach's daughter Lafracoth. The High King agreed, and he dispatched Lafracoth with a fleet to assist the de Bellemes. However, Robert and Arnulf were defeated by Henry before the fleet could arrive to assist them.

According to a Welsh chronicle, Arnulf "thought to make peace with the Irish and to obtain help from them. And he sent messengers to Ireland, that is Gerald the Steward (Gerald of Windsor) and many others, to ask for the daughter of King Murtart for his wife. And that he easily obtained; and the messengers came joyfully to their land. And Murtart sent his daughter and many armed ships along with her to his aid. And when the earls had exalted themselves with pride because of those events, they refused to accept any peace from the king."

De Montgomery and his brother Robert were defeated by Henry, however, and fled to Ireland. The Montgomery brothers fought under Muirchertach during his campaign with Magnus Barefoot, but when de Montgomery attempted to seize the kingship for himself, Muirchertach "took his daughter away from Arnulf and gave the wanton girl in an unlawful marriage to one of his cousins. He resolved to kill Arnulf himself as a reward for his alliance, but the latter ... fled to his own people and lived for twenty years afterwards with no fixed abode."

According to Orderic Vitalis, Muirchertach only allowed the Normans to stay in case he needed their support to fight Magnus if he were to violate their treaty and attack the Irish. However, after the Norwegian King's death at the hands of the Ulaid, Muirchertach turned against the English rebels and forced them out of Ireland, possibly in an attempt to make amends with Henry. Indeed, Henry had imposed sanctions on Irish trade for their assistance in helping the rebels, but Muirchertach was able to negotiate the lifting of the embargo (possibly by handing Arnulf over to the English), while also again demonstrating his skill in diplomacy.

However, it does seem unlikely that Muirchertach would have turned against the Normans. It is possible Arnulf was not even in Ireland at the time of Magnus's death. The marriage between Muirchertach's daughter and Arnulf went ahead regardless, and later, the High King wrote to the English bishop Anselm of Canterbury, thanking him for intervening with Henry on behalf of his son-in-law. It is possible Henry would have executed Arnulf otherwise. Although Arnulf was pardoned, the de Belleme family was never really forgiven by Henry for the rebellion.

== Scotland and the Isles ==
Following the death of Magnus Barefoot in 1103 and the withdrawal of Norwegian military forces from the Irish Sea area, Muirchertach successfully resumed his attempts to expand Irish power in the region at the expense of the Norse. He was able to re-install his nephew Diarmuit as King of the Isle of Man in the year 1111. With direct control of the Isle of Man, he also exercised control over the other Islands close to the Scottish mainland. At the time, Scotland was ruled by King Edgar.

In 1105, Muirchertach received the gift of a camel from Edgar. This is seen by modern historians as significant as camels were very rare in the British Isles. There are several possible explanations for this gift, but this period of Scottish history is not very well-documented in comparison with other areas of the British Isles. Even the details of Edgar's reign are relatively unknown. It has been noted that there would have been many Irish clerics in the court of Edgar, so it is likely he was in contact with the King of Scotland.

Furthermore, the possibility has been raised that Edgar sent the gift as either a reward or thanks, or in an effort to make peace. Muirchertach's fleets were documented to be active in the area at the time. It is possible Muirchertach supported rebels fighting against the King, or the other way around, supporting Edgar as he fought against rebellious subjects.

Other potential reasons for this gift are that Muirchertach's fleets were plundering the Scottish coast, and Edgar wanted to make peace, or some lesser Irish Kings from Ulster were raiding the coast of Scotland and Edgar requested Muirchertach's assistance in stopping them. Either way, it is evident Muirchertach's influence reached as far as Scotland, that Edgar viewed the High King as either a valuable ally or a serious threat, and that peace with him was the best option.

== Later life and death ==
By 1100, Muirchertach controlled almost all of the island, apart from the north-western territory of the Northern Uí Néill who, under the leadership of King Domnall Ua Lochlainn continued to remain defiant. However, as the conflict between Muirchertach and Domnall was reduced to a stalemate, Muirchertach became less committed to war and began focusing on other aspects of his rule.

In the period of 1101–1112, he, like his father Toirdelbach Ua Briain, presided over the Synod of Cashel, and was able to influence reforms in the Church, notably relating to marriage. He also enacted more laws, and reformed aspects of the justice system. He presented more gifts to the Church. Like many rulers, not only in Ireland but throughout Europe, he seemed to realise having the Catholic Church on his side was important to a successful reign.

However, conflict with Ua Lochlainn flared again in 1112 when Domnall defied Muirchertach by marching south to Dublin, where he burned Fingal and carried away many captives and herds of cattle. This led Muirchertach to return once more to the North to deal with Domnall, but a peace was again organised by the abbot of Armagh. After a month-long stand-off, matters were settled, and Muirchertach returned home to Munster.

In 1114, the King became "sick to the point of a living skeleton", and his brother Diarmuit took advantage of the High King's misfortune to steal the Kingship and banish Muirchertach. However, the next year, Muirchertach miraculously regained his strength and returned to his home, from whence he launched campaigns against Diarmuit. He finally managed to capture his rebellious brother in 1115, but his High Kingship seemed to be disintegrating.

The young Toirdelbach Ua Conchobhair, King of Connacht, son of Muirchertach's old rival Ruadhrí na Saide Buide, and Muirchertach's nephew, at only twenty-seven years of age, was making quite a name for himself in the political landscape of Ireland. He launched repeated invasions of Munster, which Muirchertach struggled to repel in his weakened position. Muirchertach was further weakened by rebellions by the MacCarthy Mór dynasty in southern Munster, who had been living under the rule of the O'Brien dynasty for over a century. These rebellions were supported by Ua Conchobhair, who managed to successfully invade and partition the Kingdom of Munster in 1118. Muirchertach died in 1119 and the Annals of Ulster call him 'king of Ireland and tower of the honour and dignity of the western world."

Munster was divided into three Kingdoms: the Kingdom of Thomond under the O'Brien dynasty, the Kingdom of Desmond under the MacCarthy Mór dynasty, and the Kingdom of Airgíalla under the Kennedys, although the last was short-lived. Muirchertach apparently went into retirement having lost his High Kingship, and died at Lismore, modern County Waterford, a year later in 1119. He was succeeded by Toirdelbach Ua Conchobhair as High King of Ireland, who would prove to be one of the greatest High Kings in the history of Ireland. Although the O'Briens never reclaimed the High Kingship, the Kingdom of Thomond remained a powerful kingdom for the next few centuries.

== Assessments ==
Anthony Candon (1979, p. 398) remarked of Ó Briain:

Muirchertach Ó Briain was an ambitious, modernising and outward-looking king whose goal was to make himself king of Ireland as much as William Rufus and Henry I were kings of England; in reality his position was, perhaps, more analogous to that of Philip I in France ... but his actual authority in Ireland, especially at the height of his power in the first years of the twelfth century, greatly exceeded that of Phillip in France. ... Ua Briain ... pursued a vigorous foreign policy which was to carry his activities beyond his own shores.

In the latter regard, Candon (1979, p. 415) views

Ua Briain's activities in the Irish Sea area [as] a mixture of old and new, of pragmatism and idealism ... But they are invested with a modern purpose. Ua Briain makes one marriage with the king of Norway, and another with one of the most powerful non-royal families in Europe; he treats with the king of Scotland; his aid to the Welsh princes acts as a stabilising influence in Welsh politics; he incurs trade sanctions from the king of England, and negotiates their suspension. Altogether, Muirchertach Ó Briain lifted his head above the domestic power struggle and sought to involve Ireland in the international politics of Europe, so that some sixty years later, these activities were still well remembered, and are reflected in the vitae of St. Flannan of Killaloe.
