= Uí Ceinnselaig =

Irish dynastic family

- Parent house: Laigin
- Country: Ireland
- Founded: 5th century
- Founder: Énnae Cennsalach
- Titles: King of Leinster; High King of Ireland; King of Dublin; King of the Isles; King of Uí Ceinnselaig

The Uí Ceinselaig (also Uí Ceinselaig, Anglicized as Kinsella), from the Old Irish "grandsons of Cennsalach", are an Irish dynasty of Leinster who trace their descent from Énnae Cennsalach, a supposed contemporary of Niall of the Nine Hostages. Énda was said to be a grandson of Bressal Bélach and a first cousin of Dúnlaing mac Énda Niada, eponymous ancestor of the rival Uí Dúnlainge.

The earliest associations of the Uí Ceinnselaig are with the region around Rathvilly, County Carlow, and the headwaters of the River Slaney, but in time the centre of their power was pushed southwards, later being found around Ferns, County Wexford, site of the monastery of the saint Máedóc of Ferns (d. 626 or 632).

In early times the kings of Leinster came from the Uí Ceinnselaig and the Uí Dúnlainge, but the Uí Dúnlainge came to dominate the kingship of the province, and after Áed mac Colggen (d. 738) it was three hundred years until the next Uí Ceinnselaig king of Leinster, Diarmait mac Máel na mBó (see list of Kings of Uí Cheinnselaig).

A branch of the family, the descendants of the Uí Ceinnselaig dynast Murchad mac Diarmata meic Máel na mBó, took the surname mac Murchada (from which modern Irish Mac Murchadha, anglicised as MacMurrough, Murphy, Morrow, etc.). From this branch descended Domhnall Caomhánach, founder of the Caomhánach family. Another segment of the Uí Ceinnselaig family, the descendants of the Uí Ceinnselaig dynast Domnall Remar mac Mael na mBó, took the Irish surname Ua Domnaill. Both branches—the Meic Murchada and the Uí Domnaill—were bitter rivals over the kingship of Uí Ceinnselaig.

Notable kings of the Uí Ceinnselaig and related kindreds included:

- Brandub mac Echach (died 603)
- Áed mac Colggen (died 738)
- Diarmait mac Máel na mBó (died 1072)
- Murchad mac Diarmata (died 1070)
- Diarmait Mac Murchada (died 1171)
- Aoife MacMurrough (died 1188)
- Art Mór Mac Murchadha Caomhánach (died 1417)

== See also ==
- List of Kings of Uí Cheinnselaig
- Kinsella
- Caomhánach
- Laigin
- Gaelic nobility of Ireland
- Chief of the Name
- Irish royal families
