= Murchad mac Diarmata =

11th century King of Leinster, Dublin, and the Isles

Murchad mac Diarmata (English: Murrough MacDermot) (died 1070) was a late eleventh-century ruler of the kingdoms of Leinster, Dublin, and the Isles. He was a member of the Uí Chennselaig, and a son of Diarmait mac Máel na mBó, King of Leinster (died 1072). Murchad had three sons: Domnall (died 1075), Donnchad (died 1115), and Énna. He is the eponymous founder of the Meic Murchada, a branch of the Uí Chennselaig who adopted the surname Mac Murchada (MacMurrough, MacMorrow, Morrow).

Murchad led an army into the Kingdom of Meath in July 1069 "where he burned territories and churches", he was however badly wounded by Feichin, a defender. It was probably these injuries, or complications, that led to Murchad's death in 1070. He was then buried in Áth Cliath, near what is now Dublin.

== Murchad's death in the Annals of the Four Masters ==
Murchadh, son of Diarmaid, son of Mael-na-mbo, lord of the foreigners and of Leinster, under his father, died at Ath-cliath, precisely on Sunday, the festival of Mary, in winter. It was in lamentation of him the poet composed these quatrains:

There is grief for a chief king at Ath Cliath,
Which will not be exceeded till the terrible Judgment Day;
Empty is the fortress without the descendant of Duach,
Quickly was the vigour of its heroes cut down.
Sorrowful every party in the fortress
For their chief, against whom no army prevailed;
Since the body of the king was hidden from all,
Every evil has showered ever constant.
For Murchadh, son of Diarmaid the impetuous,
Many a fervent prayer is offered;
In sorrow for the death of the chief is every host
That was wont to defeat in the battle,
Great the sorrow that he was not everlasting;
Pity that death hath attacked him.
Too early it was that he removed from him his complexion,
That he removed one like him from his body.
Liberal of wealth was the grandson of Mael-na-mbo;
He bestowed horses, and he distributed cows,
For the sake of his going to God.
Who is it to whom 'tis best to give fleeting wealth?

== Sources ==
- https://www.ucc.ie/celt/published/T100005B/index.html
- "Irish Kings and High Kings", Francis John Byrne, Dublin, 1973.
- Ancestral Roots of Certain American Colonists Who Came to America Before 1700 by Frederick Lewis Weis, Line 175–4.

Regnal titles
Preceded by Echmarcach mac Ragnaill	King of Dublin; 1052–1070	Succeeded by Diarmait mac Maíl na mBó
Preceded by Echmarcach mac Ragnaill	King of the Isles; 1061–1070	Succeeded by Gofraid mac Sitriuc
