= Diarmait mac Máel na mBó =

- King of Leinster, King of Ireland with opposition
- Predecessor: Murchad mac Dúnlainge
- Successor: Domnall mac Murchada
- Died: 7 February 1072; Odba (near Navan, County Meath)
- Wife: Derbforgaill, daughter of Donnchad mac Briain
- Issue: Murchad, Glúniairn,
- Dynasty: Uí Cheinnselaig
- Father: Donnchad Máel na mBó [mac Domnaill]
- Mother: Aife, daughter of Gilla Pátraic mac Donnchada of Osraige

Diarmait mac Máel na mBó (died 7 February 1072) was King of Leinster, as well as High King of Ireland (with opposition). He was one of the most important and significant kings in Ireland in the pre-Norman era.

== Background ==
Diarmait belonged to the Uí Cheinnselaig, a kin group of south-east Leinster centred on Ferns. His father, Donnchad mac Diarmata, became known more commonly by the epithet Máel na mBó ("Baldy of the Cattle"), hence Diarmait's patronym. The last of Diarmait's ancestors to have been counted as king of all Leinster, Crimthann mac Énnai, died in the late 5th century; but Diarmait's more immediate forebears, most recently his great-grandfather Domnall mac Cellaig (died 974), had been counted among the kings of the Uí Cheinnselaig. Diarmait's mother was Aife, daughter of Gilla Pátraic mac Donnchada, king of Osraige. He had at least one sibling, a brother named Domnall whose son Donnchad mac Domnaill Remair later became king of Leinster.

The Uí Cheinnselaig had been prominent in earlier times, but their power had been broken at the battle of Áth Senaig in 738. The rival Uí Dúnlainge, based in northern Leinster around Naas and Kildare, who also enjoyed the support of the powerful Clann Cholmáin kings of Mide, dominated Leinster until the time of Brian Bóruma. The decline of Clann Cholmáin, and the defeat inflicted on the Uí Dúnlainge, led by Máel Mórda mac Murchada, at the battle of Clontarf in 1014, changed the political landscape to favour the Uí Cheinnselaig once more.

The return of the Vikings to Ireland in the early 10th century occasioned the development of new towns on the coasts. The towns, centres of trade and manufacture, would give significant political power to those who could control their wealth. Kings of Leinster found themselves in a particularly advantageous position to exploit this new wealth as three of the five principal towns lay in or near Leinster. In Leinster proper, in the south-eastern corner dominated by the Uí Cheinnselaig, lay Wexford. To the west of this, in the smaller kingdom of Osraige, which had been attached to Leinster since the late 10th century, was Waterford. Finally, the most important Viking town in Ireland, Dublin, lay at the north-eastern edge of Leinster. Compared to this, kings in the north and west of Ireland had easy access to no towns, while those in the south, in Munster, had access to two: Cork on the south coast and Limerick on the west coast.

== Biography ==
He made an alliance with Niall mac Eochada, king of Ulaid, which helped to put pressure both from the north and south on the kingdoms of Mide, Brega and Dublin — ruled by the High King.

In 1042 he was able to claim the title "King of Leinster" and install his son, Murchad, as King of Dublin. Thus ruler of two of the most powerful and wealthy towns on the island, he was able to make a bid for the High-Kingship. It was during a battle against the king of Mide, Conchobar Ua Maelsechalinn, that he was killed, near to Navan. County Meath, on 7 February 1072.

The surviving sons of King Harold Godwinson of England escaped to Leinster after the Battle of Hastings in 1066 where they were hosted by Diarmait. In 1068 and 1069 Diarmait lent them the fleet of Dublin for their attempted invasions of England. In 1068 Diarmait presented another Irish king with Harold's battle standard.

He is also famous as the ancestor of Diarmait MacMurrough.

== Diarmait's Death in the Annals of the Four Masters ==
"Diarmaid, son of Mael-na-mbo, King of Leinster, of the foreigners of Ath-cliath, and of Leath-Mogha-Nuadhat, was slain and beheaded in the battle of Odhbha, on Tuesday, the seventh of the Ides of February, the battle having been gained over him by Conchobhar O'Maeleachlainn, King of Meath. There were also slain many hundreds of the foreigners and Leinstermen, along with Diarmaid, in that battle. In it was killed Gillaphadraig O'Fearghaile, lord of the Fortuatha, &c. Of the death of Diarmaid was said:"

Two, seven times ten above one thousand,
From the birth of Christ is reckoned,
To this year, in which Diarmaid,
First man in Leinster, fell.
Diarmaid, of the ruddy-coloured aspect,
A king who maintained the standard of war,
Whose death brought scarcity of peace,
The loss of the heroes of Ladhrann, with their ships.
Comely youths were cut down there,
Together with the head of Claire and Cualann.
It caused in the breeze an unpleasant noise,
The loss of the King of Riada of great valour.
Until at Muillenn-Chul was slain
A brave chieftain of a strong fortress,
Until the furious fire-brand fell by treachery,
They found no hero who dared with him contend.
It is a red wound through my firm heart;
For the host from Caindruim it was not just
To destroy our noble chief they had no right,
It has quenched their spirit greatly,
Diarmaid of the laughing teeth under violent sorrow;
There is not on account of his death banquet or feast;
There will not be peace, there will not be armistice.

== Sources ==
- Annals of the Four Masters
- Annals text
- Bracken, Damian (2004), "Mac Briain, Donnchad (d. 1064)", Oxford Dictionary of National Biography, Oxford: Oxford University Press
- Bracken, Damian (2004), "Ua Briain, Toirdelbach [Turlough O'Brien] (1009–1086)", Oxford Dictionary of National Biography, Oxford: Oxford University Press
- Byrne, Francis John (1973), Irish Kings and High-Kings, London: Batsford, ISBN 0-7134-5882-8
- Hudson, Benjamin (2004), "Diarmait mac Máel na mBó (d. 1072)", Oxford Dictionary of National Biography, Oxford: Oxford University Press
- Hudson, Benjamin (2005), Viking Pirates and Christian Princes: Dynasty, Religion and Empire in the North Atlantic, Oxford: Oxford University Press, ISBN 0-19-516237-4
- Ó Cróinín, Dáibhí (1995), Early Medieval Ireland: 400–1200, The Longman History of Ireland, London: Longman, ISBN 0-582-01565-0
