= Uí Ímair =

Medieval Norse-Gael royal family

Ivar Dynasty
- Founded: 9th century?
- Founder: Ímar
- Titles: King of the Foreigners; Queen of Ireland; Queen of Norway; King of Northumbria; (King of Scotland); Queen of Leinster; King of Dublin; King of Limerick; King of Waterford; King of the Isles; King of Mann; King of the Rhinns
- Cadet branches: Crovan dynasty

The Uí Ímair (Irish: [iː ˈiːwəɾʲ]; meaning ‘scions of Ivar’), also known as the Ivar dynasty or Ivarids, was a Norse-Gael dynasty which ruled much of the Irish Sea region, the Kingdom of Dublin, the western coast of Scotland, including the Hebrides and some part of Northern England, from the mid 9th century.

The dynasty lost control of York in the mid 10th century, but reigned over the other domains at variously disputed times, depending on which rulers may be counted among their descendants. This has proved a difficult question for scholars to determine, because reliable pedigrees do not survive. Additionally, for between three and four decades, the Uí Ímair were overkings of the Kingdom of Scotland itself, distinct from the Kingdom of Strathclyde, of which they may also have been overkings, and later briefly the Irish province of Munster, dominated from Waterford, and later still, briefly the English kingdom of Mercia. In the west of Ireland, the Uí Ímair also supplied at least two kings of Limerick, from which they may have attempted to conquer Munster again.

Some historians believe Ímar and Ivar the Boneless to be identical, others claim they are two different individuals. According to Irish annals, Ímar was the son of Gofraid (also Goffridh, Gothfraid or Guðrøðr), who was the king of Lochlann. The Norwegians at this point were often referred to as Lochlanns by the Irish. Lochlann was widely accepted among scholars as being identical to Norway; recently, however, this has been questioned by Donnchadh Ó Corráin and other. His and others' theory is that Lochlann was the "viking Scotland" (Norse/Norwegian settlements on the Scottish islands and northern mainland). Whether the Irish annals used the term Lochlann to refer to Norway or to the Norse settlements in Scotland is still a matter of debate; however, by the 11th century the term had come to mean Norway. According to Donnchadh Ó Corráin, there is no evidence that any branch of the royal Danish dynasty ruled in Ireland. He also claims that Ímar's brother, Amlaíb Conung (the name "Conung" is from the Old Norse konungr and simply means "king"), who often has been identified as part of the royal Norwegian dynasty (Ynglingene), was in fact not. He argues that both Ímar and his brothers were part of a Norse dynasty centered in and around the Scottish mainland.

The Norwegian historian Kim Hjardar and archaeologist Vegard Vike claim that Ímar is the same person as the Dane Ivar the Boneless, and that he and the Norwegian chieftain Amlaíb Conung (Olaf the White) arrived in Ireland as leaders of a coalition of Vikings whose goal was to take control over the Viking settlements in Ireland. When the Irish annals describe Ímar and Amlaíb Conung as brothers, Hjardar and Vike claims that this has to be interpreted as a metaphor for "warrior brothers" or "brothers in arms".

Alex Woolf points out it would be a mistake to view the lordship as a "unitary empire"; it was, rather, a collection of lordships ruled by the same kindred, with only varying degrees of unity depending on the political circumstances of the moment and the charisma of individual leaders. Especially in the early period, a great portion of the dynasty's wealth, probably the majority, came from the international slave trade, both as slavers themselves and from the taxation of it, for which they were infamous in their time. In this role they star as the principal antagonists in the early 12th-century Irish epic political tract The War of the Irish with the Foreigners, although the account is exaggerated.

One of the greatest dynasties of the Viking Age, the Uí Ímair were at their height a fearsome and wide-reaching power in the British Isles and perhaps beyond. Like the contemporary Rurikids in the East they ultimately integrated with the native population; further, their impact on the histories of Scotland and Ireland are still visible through the cities they founded and the Norse-Gael descendants they left behind.

== Ancestral homeland ==
Some historians believe Ímar and Ivar the Boneless to be identical, others claim they are two different individuals. According to Irish annals, Ímar was the son of Gofraid (also Goffridh, Gothfraid or Guðrøðr), who was the king of Lochlann. The Norwegians at this point were often referred to as Lochlanns by the Irish. Lochlann was widely accepted among scholars as being identical to Norway; recently, however, this has been questioned by Donnchadh Ó Corráin and other. His and others' theory is that Lochlann was the "viking Scotland" (Norse/Norwegian settlements on the Scottish islands and northern mainland). Whether the Irish annals used the term Lochlann to refer to Norway or to the Norse settlements in Scotland is still a matter of debate; however, by the 11th century the term had come to mean Norway. According to Donnchadh Ó Corráin, there is no evidence that any branch of the royal Danish dynasty ruled in Ireland. He also claims that Ímar's brother, Amlaíb Conung (the name "Conung" is from the Old Norse konungr and simply means "king"), who often has been identified as part of the royal Norwegian dynasty (Ynglingene), was in fact not. He argues that both Ímar and his brothers were part of a Norse dynasty centered in and around the Scottish mainland.

The Norwegian historian Kim Hjardar and archaeologist Vegard Vike claim that Ímar is the same person as the Dane Ivar the Boneless, and that he and the Norwegian chieftain Amlaíb Conung (Olaf the White) arrived in Ireland as leaders of a coalition of Vikings whose goal was to take control over the Viking settlements in Ireland. When the Irish annals describe Ímar and Amlaíb Conung as brothers, Hjardar and Vike claims that this has to be interpreted as a metaphor for "warrior brothers" or "brothers in arms".

== Dynasts ==
The following list contains only members mentioned in the Irish annals and other reliable and semi-reliable sources, such as the Cogad Gáedel re Gallaib, and among those only the ones who can be placed in the pedigree with relative confidence. Thus it is by no means complete. Among recent developments in scholarship it has been argued that the historical king of Northumbria contributing to the character of Eric Bloodaxe was actually an Uí Ímair dynast.

First proposed by James Henthorn Todd in 1867, and most recently considered by Alex Woolf and Clare Downham, it is possible the Uí Ímair were peculiar in that some early members, and possibly the entire known later dynasty, descended from the founder via the female line.

After various authors. Birthdates are unknown. mac = son of; ingen = daughter of; ua = grandchild of; Ua (h)Ímair = surname (descendant of Ímar).

Pedigree of the Dynasty of Ivar
- Ímar/Ívar/Ivar/Ívarr (died 873)
  - Bárid mac Ímair (died 881)
  - Sichfrith mac Ímair (died 888)
  - Sitriuc mac Ímair (died 896)
  - Sigríð ingen Ímair, and/or among the above sons
    - Amlaíb ua Ímair (died 896)
    - Sitric Cáech (died 927)
    - Ímar mac Ímair (died 904)
    - Ragnall ua Ímair (died 920/1)
      - ? mac Ragnaill (died 942)
      - Ímar mac Ragnaill (died 950)
        - probably Ímar of Waterford (died 1000)
          - Gilla Pátraic mac Ímair (died 983)
          - Ragnall mac Ímair (died 995)
          - Donndubán mac Ímair (died 996)
          - Ragnall mac Ímair II (died 1018)
            - ? mac Ragnaill (died 1015)
            - Ragnall mac Ragnaill (died 1035)
          - Sihtric mac Ímair (died 1022)
    - Sitric Cáech (died 927)
      - Sichfrith mac Sitric (died 937)
      - Ausle mac Sitric (died 937)
      - Aralt mac Sitric (died 940)
        - probably Maccus mac Arailt (died 984/7)
        - probably Gofraid mac Arailt (died 989)
          - Ragnall mac Gofraid (died 1005)
          - Lagmann mac Gofraid (died ?)
            - Amlaíb mac Lagmann (died 1014)
              - ? Donnchadh mac Amlaíb (died 1014)
          - Máel Muire ingen Gofraid (died ?)
      - Gofraid mac Sitriuc (died 951)
      - Amlaíb Cuarán (died 981)
        - Ragnall mac Amlaíb (died 980)
        - Glúniairn (died 989)
          - Gilla Ciaráin mac Glúniairn (died 1014)
          - Sitric? mac Glúniairn (fl. 1036)
        - Aralt mac Amlaíb (died 999)
          - Ímar mac Arailt (died 1054)
        - Dubgall mac Amlaíb (died 1014)
        - Ragnailt ingen Amlaíb (died ?)
        - Máel Muire ingen Amlaíb (died 1021)
        - Gytha ingen Amlaíb (died ?)
        - Sigtrygg Silkbeard (died 1042)
          - Artalach mac Sitric (died 999)
          - Amlaíb mac Sitric I/II (died 1013)
          - Glúniairn mac Sitric (died 1031)
          - Amlaíb mac Sitriuc II/I (died 1034)
            - Ragnailt ingen Amlaíb (died ?)
          - Gofraid mac Sitric (died 1036)
          - Cellach ingen Sitric (died 1042)
    - Gofraid ua Ímair (died 934)
      - Alpdann mac Gofraid (died 927)
      - Amlaíb mac Gofraid (died 941)
        - Cammán mac Amlaíb (fl. 962)
      - Ragnall mac Gofraid (fl. 943)
      - Blácaire mac Gofraid (died 948)
    - Ímar ua Ímair (Ivarr Ivarrsson)
      - Ímar Ua hÍmair, of Limerick (died 977)
        - Cú Allaidh mac Ímair (died 977)
        - Dubcenn mac Ímair (died 977)
          - Osli mac Dubceinn (died 1012)
          - Amond mac Dubceinn (died 1014)
        - Aralt mac Ímair (died 978)

The precise lineage of one of the last widely agreed upon members of the dynasty, Echmarcach mac Ragnaill, is uncertain. He was either a descendant of Ivar of Waterford (died 1000) or Gofraid mac Arailt (died 989). That of Cacht ingen Ragnaill, Queen of Donnchad mac Briain, may or may not depend upon Echmarcach's.

=== Family tree ===
Family tree of the Uí Ímair

Ímar
Bárid	Sichfrith	Sitriuc	Unknown (Note: The parentage of Ímar's grandsons is unknown)
Uathmarán	Sitric Cáech	Ímar	Ragnall	Amlaíb	Gofraid
Sichfrith	Aralt	Sichfrith	Auisle	Gofraid	Amlaíb Cuarán	Mac Ragnaill	Ragnall	Blácaire	Amlaíb	Albann
Gofraid	Maccus	Ragnall	Glúniarran	Sitric Silkbeard	Aralt	Dubgall	Máel Muire	Ímar	Cammán	Gofraid

== Later Waterford and Limerick ==
The independent dynasty of Waterford founded or continued by Ivar of Waterford (died 1000) cannot be linked genealogically to the 'central' line of Dublin kings, but James Henthorn Todd gave him a descent from Ragnall ua Ímair, who never ruled there. Their claim to Dublin and the names of their dynasts suggest they did belong to the dynasty.

Like in the case of the late Waterford dynasty, the pedigree of the last Norse to rule in Limerick is also uncertain. Ivar of Limerick (died 977), and surnamed Ua hÍmair, features prominently in the early 12th century saga Cogad Gáedel re Gallaib, although he appears less in the annals, which are lacunose and in general poorer for western Ireland. In any case he and/or the Waterford dynasty are probably survived today through intermarriage with the O'Donovan family, verifiably associated with both and known for their use of Uí Ímair dynastic names in medieval times. A notable sept of the O'Donovans known as the Sliocht Íomhair or "Seed of Ivor" survived into early modern times. It is also periodically claimed that some of the family may even be male line descendants of Ivar of Waterford, a variant of which (through his son Donndubán) actually appeared in the Encyclopædia Britannica for a few decades. This remains unverified and the family do not make this last claim themselves. All (surviving) septs profess a Gaelic lineage.

== Loss of Dublin ==
How long the Uí Ímair remained in Dublin after losing it to the Uí Cheinnselaig in 1052 is unknown. Following the death of Diarmait mac Maíl na mBó in 1072 the kingship appears to have been held by one Gofraid mac Amlaíb meic Ragnaill, who may or may not have been a candidate supported by Toirdelbach Ua Briain. While it has been argued he was installed by Toirdelbach, the annals themselves make no such statement, which but for one only briefly report Gofraid's death in 1075, and variously style him King of the Foreigners and King of Dublin. But according to the Annals of Inisfallen "Gofraid grandson of Ragnall, king of Áth Cliath, was banished over sea by Tairdelbach Ua Briain, and he died beyond the sea, having assembled a great fleet [to come] to Ireland." So Gofraid, regardless of how he took the throne, thought he had some chance of reestablishing the dynasty independent in Dublin in spite of the Gaels. Godred Crovan may have been successful for a period after him.

== Later Ireland in general, and intermarriage ==
The Uí Ímair dynasty was the precursor of a number of families in Ireland, both Gaelic and Norse speaking.

However, the Norman invasion of Ireland led to the destruction of a vast majority of the medieval Norse-Irish and Gaelic aristocracy alike. This destruction was completed with the later Tudor conquest.

Nevertheless, dense clusters of given names strongly associated with the Norse dynasty can be found in notionally Gaelic families, in the great genealogical compilations of Dubhaltach Mac Fhirbhisigh and Cú Choigcríche Ó Cléirigh, and in various other sources. And, while the dynasty was concentrated in Dublin, Waterford and Limerick, and thus in the southern half of Ireland, Gaelic families later using their given names with great frequency are found mainly in the northern half of Ireland: their pedigrees associate them with the Connachta, Uí Maine, and Northern Uí Néill. None of these northern dynasties have a documented history of willing association with the Uí Ímair, or in the case of the first two any association at all. Of the Irish dynasties, the Uí Ímair are documented intermarrying only with the Osraighe (the FitzPatricks), Laigin, O'Brien dynasty, the Southern Uí Néill Clann Cholmáin and Síl nÁedo Sláine and the aforementioned O'Donovans. In any event, the one long surviving source that might have contained pedigrees of surviving septs of the Uí Ímair themselves was a section in the Great Book of Lecan. This section, specifically focused on the pedigrees and doings of the Norse families of Ireland, was still in existence in the 17th century, as reported by Mac Firbis himself, but has since become lost.

== Later Mann and the Isles ==
=== Crovan dynasty ===
Descendants of the Dublin Uí Ímair most likely persisted into the 13th century in the line of Godred Crovan, King of Dublin and King of Mann and the Isles, even though his ancestry is not completely agreed upon. He was most likely the grandson of Ímar mac Arailt above, one of the last certain Uí Ímair kings of Dublin and a grandson of Amlaíb Cuarán. Godred's descendants, although vassals of the Kings of Norway, continued to rule into the 1260s, the last being Magnús Óláfsson (to 1265), or briefly his son Guðrøðr (1275).

=== Clann Somhairle ===
Although their descent from Godred Crovan is through the female line, Alex Woolf believes the Clann Somhairle (Clan Donald and Clan MacDougall) or the Lords of the Isles can be regarded as a "cadet branch" of the Uí Ímair, as they apparently based their claim to the Isles on this descent (according to Woolf). Their founder Somerled married Ragnhild, daughter of Olafr Godredsson, King of Mann and the Isles and son of Godred Crovan. This of course assumes these dynasts belonged to the Uí Ímair. Sir Iain Moncreiffe attempted to reconstruct a male line descent from Echmarcach mac Ragnaill himself to Somerled, but Peter Kurrild-Klitgaard has demonstrated that the proposed line is problematic in several respects.

== Gwynedd ==
Amlaíb mac Sitriuc (Ólafr son of Sigtrygg Silkbeard, King of Dublin) became an ancestor of the Kings of Gwynedd through his daughter Ragnhild, wife of Cynan ab Iago and mother of the famous Gruffudd ap Cynan.

== See also ==
- House of Munsö
- Scandinavian York
- Kingdom of Dublin
- Norse–Gaels
