= Eachmarcach =

Eachmarcach, Eachmharcach, and Echmarcach (English: Afferty or Affery) are variants of a masculine Gaelic given name. The name is composed of two elements: each meaning "horse", and marcach meaning "rider", "knight".

The patronym Mac Eachmarcach, meaning "son of Afferty", has been anglicised as McCaffery and McCafferty.

== People ==
- Eachmarcach Ó Catháin (died 1790), Irish harper
- Eachmarcach MagUidhrín (died 1120), Chief of Cenél Fearadhaigh
- Echmarcach mac Ragnaill (died 1064 or 1065), Norse-Gaelic king
