= Suibne =

Suibne, modern spelling Suibhne (Irish: [ˈsˠɪvʲnʲə]), is a Gaelic male name from which the surname Sweeney is derived.

== People ==
- Suibne mac Colmáin (died c. 598), Irish king
- Suibne Menn (died c. 628), Irish king
- Suibne moccu Fir Thrí (died c. 657), abbot of Iona
- Suibne son of Maclume (died c. 891), medieval scribe of Clonmacnoise
- Suibne mac Cináeda (died 1034), King of the Gall Gaidheil
- Suibne Geilt ("Sweeney the Wild"), protagonist of the Irish language tale Buile Shuibhne (The Madness of Sweeney)
- Suibhne mac Duinnshléibhe, early 13th century Scottish magnate, eponym of Castle Sween and the MacSweens of Argyll and Ireland
- Suibne of Skellig, a monk and saint associated with Skellig Michael
