= Ímar mac Arailt =

King of Dublin (died 1054)

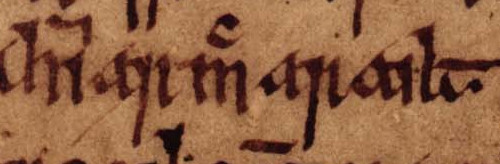
- Ímar's name it appears on folio 17r of Oxford Bodleian Library Rawlinson B 488 (the Annals of Tigernach): "h-Imar mac Arailt".

King of Dublin
- Reign: 1038–1046
- Predecessor: Echmarcach mac Ragnaill
- Successor: Echmarcach mac Ragnaill
- Died: 1054
- House: Uí Ímair
- Father: Aralt mac Amlaíb

Ímar mac Arailt (died 1054) was an eleventh-century ruler of the Kingdom of Dublin and perhaps the Kingdom of the Isles. (Note: Since the 1990s, academics have accorded Ímar various patronyms in English secondary sources: Imar mac Arailt, Ivar Haraldsson, Ivarr Haraldsson, Ivar mac Arailt, Ímar mac Arailt, Ímar mac Arallt, Ívarr Haraldarson, and Ívarr Haraldsson.) He was the son of a man named Aralt, and appears to have been a grandson of Amlaíb Cuarán, King of Northumbria and Dublin. Such a relationship would have meant that Ímar was a member of the Uí Ímair, and that he was a nephew of Amlaíb Cuarán's son, Sitriuc mac Amlaíb, King of Dublin, a man driven from Dublin by Echmarcach mac Ragnaill in 1036.

Ímar's reign in Dublin spanned at least eight years, from 1038 to 1046. Although he began by seizing the kingship from Echmarcach in 1038, he eventually lost it to him in 1046. As king, Ímar is recorded to have overseen military operations throughout Ireland, and seems to have actively assisted the family of Iago ab Idwal ap Meurig, King of Gwynedd overseas in Wales. After Echmarcach's final expulsion from Dublin 1052, Ímar may well have been reinstalled as King of Dublin by Diarmait mac Maíl na mBó, King of Leinster. Whatever the case, Ímar died in 1054. He may have been an ancestor or close kinsman of Gofraid Crobán, King of Dublin and the Isles, the progenitor of a family that ruled in the Isles until the mid thirteenth century.

== Familial background ==
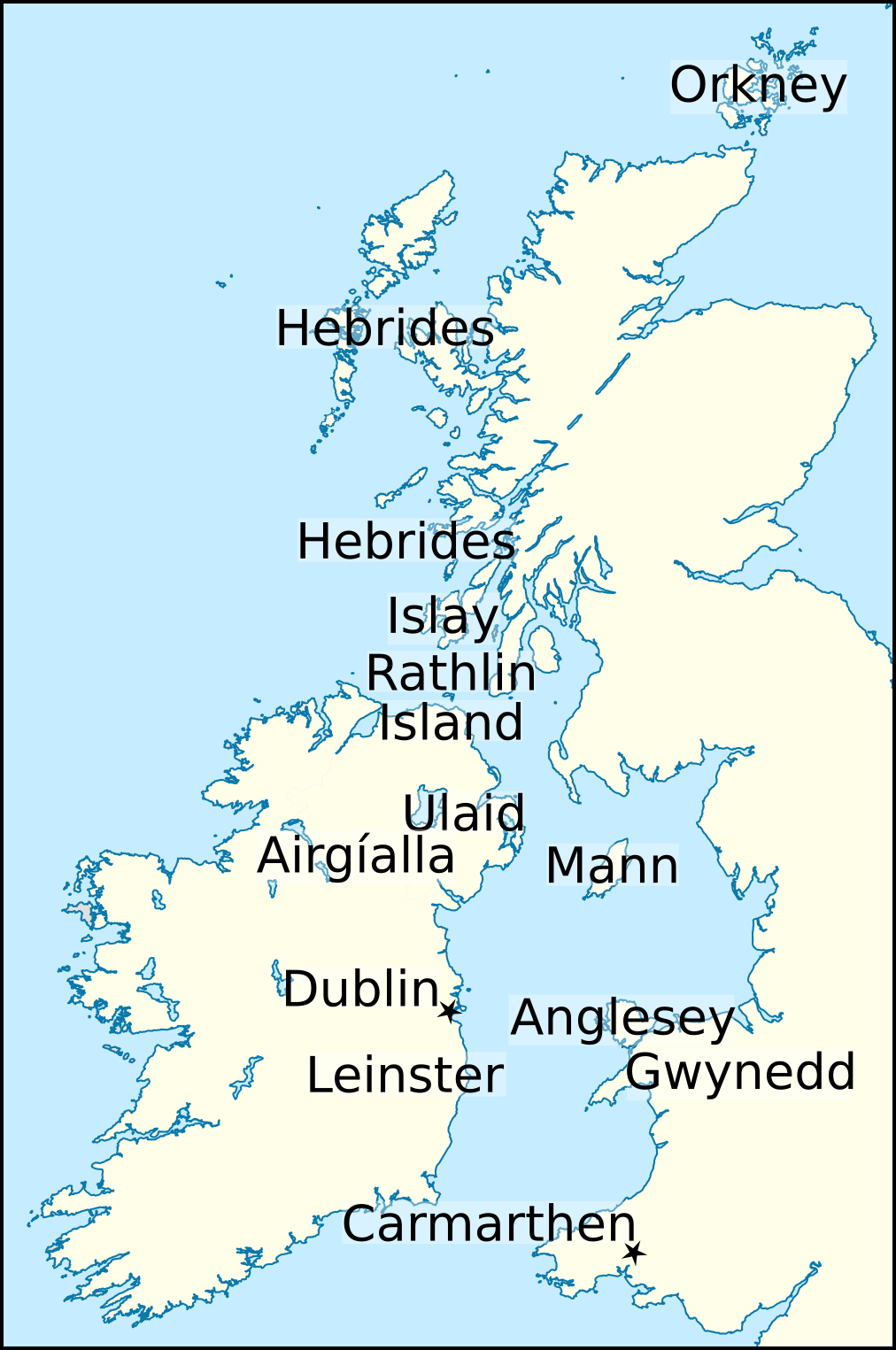
Locations relating to Ímar and his contemporaries in Britain and Ireland.

Ímar was probably the son of Aralt mac Amlaíb, a man whose death at the Battle of Glenn Máma is recorded by the seventeenth-century texts Annals of Clonmacnoise and Annals of the Four Masters, the fifteenth- to sixteenth-century Annals of Ulster, and the twelfth-century Chronicon Scotorum. (Note: According to local tradition, Aralt's grave is marked by pre-historic standing stone at Crehelp, near Dunlavin, in County Wicklow. In the nineteenth century, the battle was erroneously regarded to have been fought near Dunlavin.) If this identification is correct, Ímar's paternal grandfather would have been Amlaíb Cuarán, King of Northumbria and Dublin, and a paternal uncle of Ímar would have been Sitriuc mac Amlaíb, King of Dublin.

== Struggle for Dublin ==
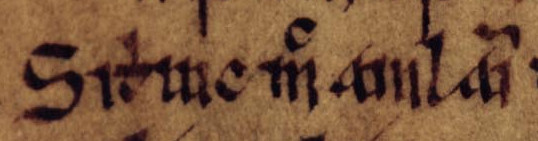
The name of Sitriuc mac Amlaíb as it appears on folio 16v of Oxford Bodleian Library Rawlinson B 488: "Sitriuic mac Amlaim".

Ímar's probable uncle, Sitriuc, ruled Dublin for almost fifty years between 989 and 1036. There is reason to suspect that the latter's realm included Mann by the second or third decade of the eleventh century. His reign in Dublin was finally put to an end by Echmarcach mac Ragnaill, who drove Sitriuc from the coastal town and claimed the kingship for himself. Previously, Sitriuc seems to have been closely aligned with Knútr Sveinnsson, ruler of the kingdoms of England, Denmark, and Norway. Knútr's apparent authority in the Irish Sea region, coupled with Sitriuc's seemingly close connections with him, could account for the remarkable security enjoyed by Sitriuc during Knútr's reign. It is possible that Echmarcach had been bound from taking action against Sitriuc whilst Knútr held power, and that the confusion caused by the latter's death in 1035 enabled Echmarcach to exploit the situation and seize control of the Irish Sea region. Although there is no direct evidence that Echmarcach controlled Mann by this date, Sitriuc does not appear to have taken refuge on the island after his expulsion from Dublin. This seems to suggest that the island was outside Sitriuc's possession, and may indicate that Mann had fallen into the hands of Echmarcach sometime before. In fact, it is possible that Echmarcach used the island to launch his takeover of Dublin.

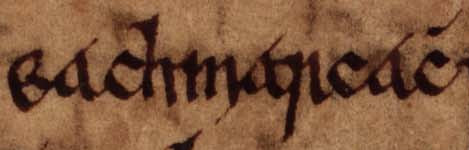
The name of Echmarcach mac Ragnaill as it appears on folio 17r of Oxford Bodleian Library Rawlinson B 488: "Eachmarcach".

Echmarcach's hold on Dublin was short-lived as the fourteenth-century Annals of Tigernach records that Ímar replaced him as King of Dublin in 1038. This annal-entry has been interpreted to indicate that Ímar drove Echmarcach from the kingship. There is reason to suspect that Þórfinnr Sigurðarson, Earl of Orkney extended his presence into the Isles and the Irish Sea region at about this period. The evidence of Þórfinnr's power in the Isles could suggest that he possessed an active interest in the ongoing struggle over the Dublin kingship. In fact, Þórfinnr's predatory operations in the Irish Sea region may have contributed to Echmarcach's loss of Dublin in 1038.

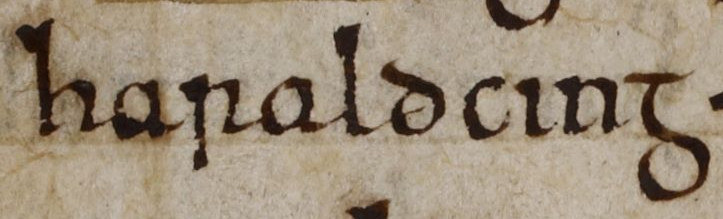
The name and title of Haraldr Knútsson as it appears on 156v of British Library Cotton Tiberius B I (the "C" version of the Anglo-Saxon Chronicle): "Harold cing".

It is conceivable that Ímar received some form of support from Knútr's son and successor in Britain, Haraldr Knútsson, King of England. The latter was certainly in power when Ímar replaced Echmarcach, and an association between Ímar and Haraldr could explain why the Annals of Ulster reports the latter's death two years later. Ímar's reign lasted about eight years, and one of his first royal acts appears to have been the invasion of Rathlin Island within the year. The fact that he proceeded to campaign in the North Channel could indicate that Echmarcach had held power in this region before his acquisition of Mann and Dublin.

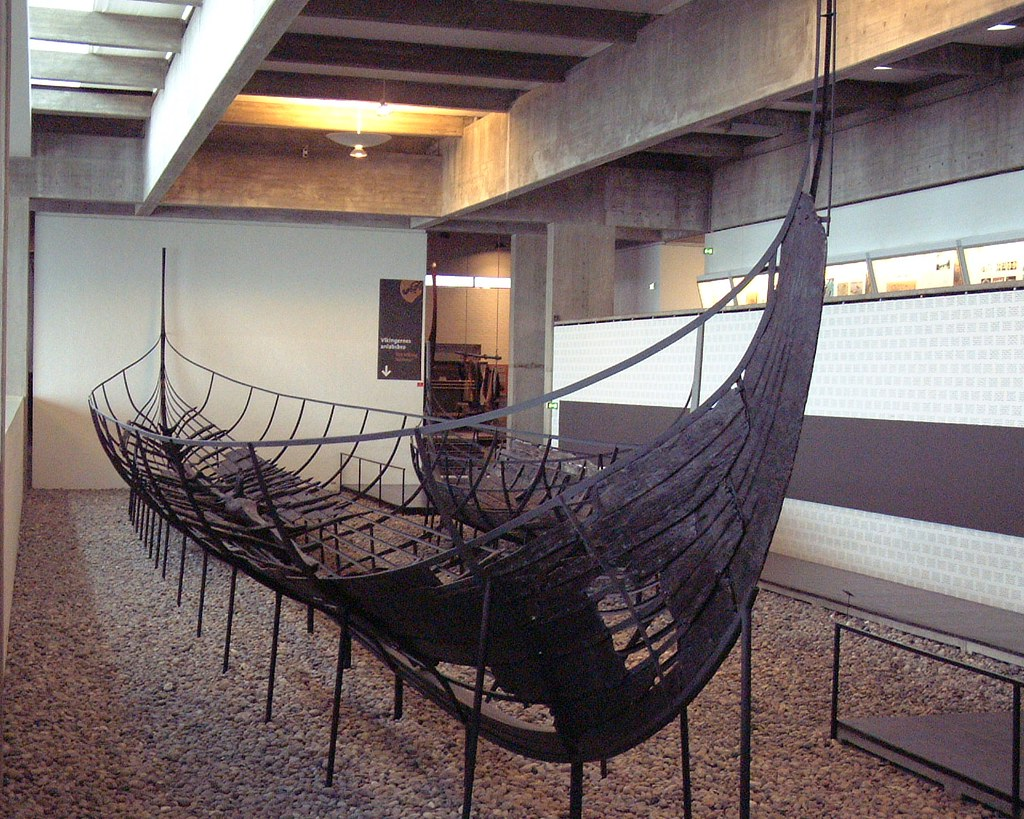
Image a

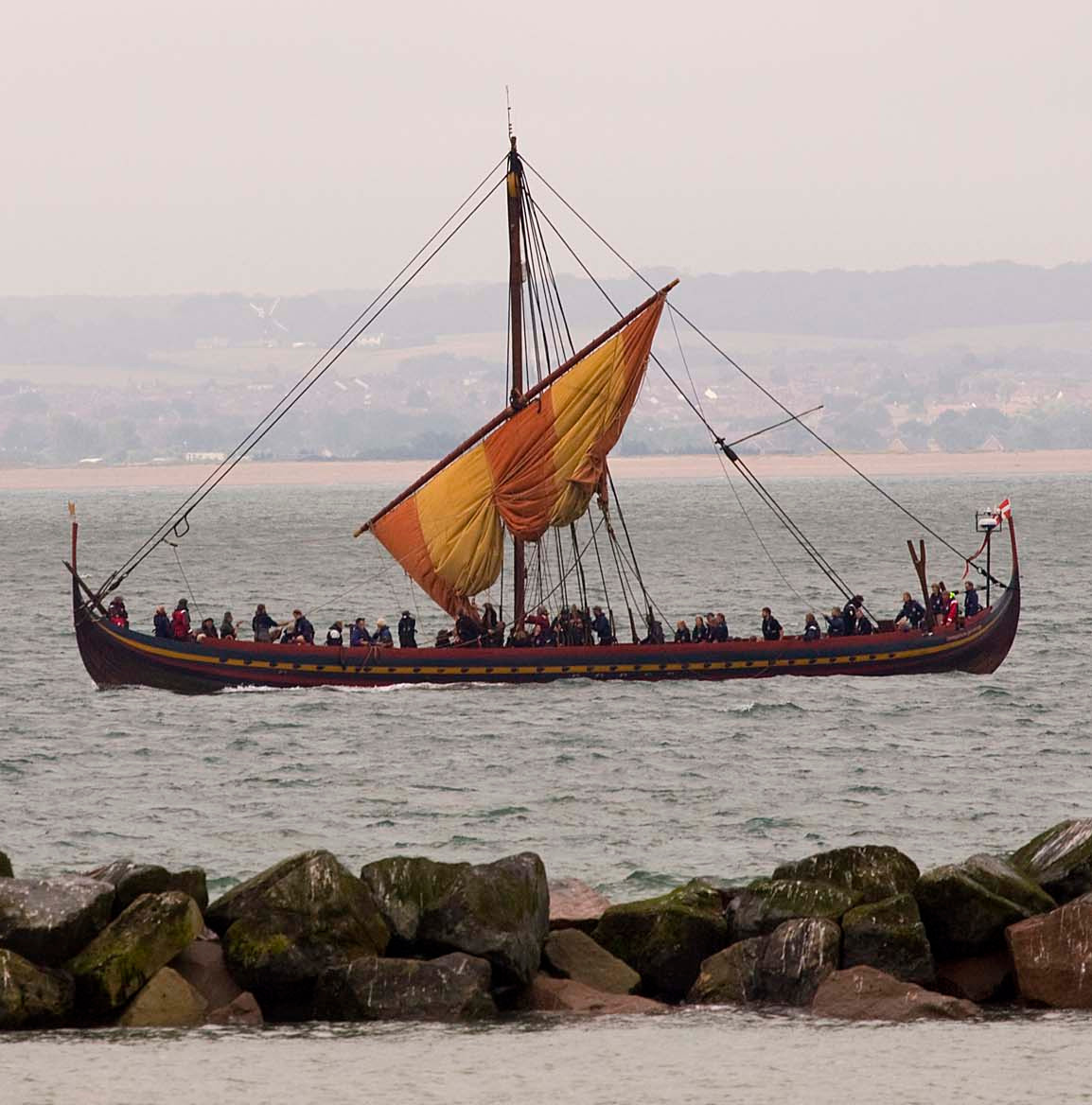
Image b

Skuldelev II (image a), a contemporary Viking longboat uncovered in Denmark, was originally built of Dublin oak. It dates to about Ímar's floruit, and could have been commissioned during his reign. Havhingsten fra Glendalough (image b), a modern Danish reconstruction of Skuldelev II.

In 1044, the Annals of Tigernach records that Ímar penetrated into the domain of the Uí Fhíachrach Arda Sratha and killed their chief. The annal-entry also indicates that Ímar stormed the church of Armagh, and burned Scrín Pátraic (the "Shrine of Patrick") in the attack. (Note: Such shrines or scrína were elaborately decorated boxes, caskets, or containers that held either parts of a saint's body, or items associated with a saint. Scrín Pátraic is noted by various Irish annals between the eighth- and eleventh centuries, and was likely constructed to accommodate some or all of the corporeal remains of Saint Patrick. The scrín was likely the principal insignia of Armagh before its destruction in 1066 by the Uí Briúin Bréifne.) The following year, he again invaded Rathlin Island, and his subsequent slaughter of three hundred noblemen of the Ulaid, including a certain heir apparent named Ragnall Ua Eochada, is documented by the Annals of Clonmacnoise, the Annals of Inisfallen, the Annals of Tigernach, and the Annals of the Four Masters. This remarkable action may indicate that the Dubliners and Ulaid were battling for control of Rathlin Island. If so, it could be evidence that Ímar enjoyed the possession of Mann by this date. The domain of the Ulaid is certainly the closest Irish territory to Mann, and the control of the Manx fleet could account for the Dubliner's ability to challenge the Ulaid. Whatever the case, within the year Niall mac Eochada, King of Ulaid is recorded to have attacked Fine Gall—Dublin's agriculturally-rich northern hinterland—in what may have been a retaliatory raid.

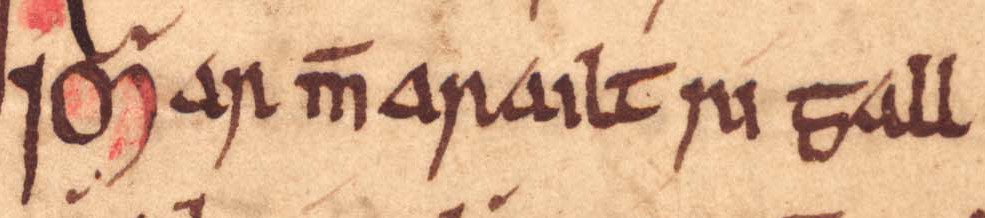
Ímar's name and title as they appear on folio 41r of Oxford Bodleian Library Rawlinson B 489 (the Annals of Ulster).

The following year, the Annals of Tigernach states that Echmarcach succeeded Ímar. (Note: This source erroneously identifies Ímar by his father's name, Aralt.) The Annals of the Four Masters specifies that Ímar was driven from the kingship by Echmarcach, who was then elected king by the Dubliners. After this point in Ímar's life, all that is known for certain is that he died in 1054, as recorded by the Annals of Ulster and the sixteenth-century Annals of Loch Cé. Nevertheless, since these sources style Ímar in Gaelic rí Gall ("king of the foreigners"), there may be evidence to suggest that, when Diarmait mac Maíl na mBó, King of Leinster drove Echmarcach from Dublin in 1052, Diarmait reinstalled Ímar as king.

After Ímar's death, Diarmait appears to have appointed his own son, Murchad, control of Dublin later that decade, as the Annals of the Four Masters accords him the title tigherna Gall, meaning "lord of the foreigners" in 1059. (Note: Although this source styles Murchad merely as a "lord", the original upon which this annal draws likely read "king". The Annals of the Four Masters is otherwise known to relegate royal titles to lordly ones.) In 1061, Murchad invaded Mann and seems to have overthrown Echmarcach. The record of Murchad's actions against Echmarcach could indicate that the latter had seated himself on the island after his expulsion from Dublin. Another possibility is that Echmarcach had only reestablished himself as king in the Isles after Ímar's death in 1054. Whatever the case, both Diarmait and Murchad were dead by 1072, and the Annals of Tigernach describes Diarmait on his obituary as King of the Isles (rí Innsi Gall, literally "king of the isles of the foreigners"), a declaration which seems to indicate that, by the eleventh century at least, the kingship of the Isles was contingent upon control of Mann.

== Involvement in Wales ==
Simplified family tree illustrating the familial connection between Ímar and the family of Cynan ab Iago, an apparent ally. Women are italicised.

Amlaíb Cuarán (died 980/981); King of Northumbria and Dublin
Sitriuc (died 1042); King of Dublin	Aralt (died 999)
Amlaíb	Ímar (died 1054); King of Dublin	Iago (died 1039); King of Gwynedd
Ragnailt	Cynan (fl. 1064)
Gruffudd (died 1137); King of Gwynedd

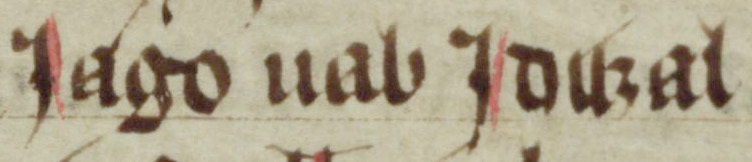
The name of Iago ab Idwal ap Meurig as it appears on folio 60r of Oxford Jesus College 111 (the Red Book of Hergest): "Jago uab Jdwal".

The principal Welsh monarch during Ímar's reign was Gruffudd ap Llywelyn. One of the latter's main rivals was Iago ab Idwal ap Meurig, King of Gwynedd, a man who had killed Gruffudd's father in 1023, and thenceforth ruled Gwynedd until his own demise in 1039. Gruffudd himself may have been responsible for Iago's slaying, and certainly succeeded to the kingship of Gwynedd after his death. It was likely in the context of Iago's fall and this resulting regime change that the latter's son, Cynan, fled overseas and sought refuge in Dublin.

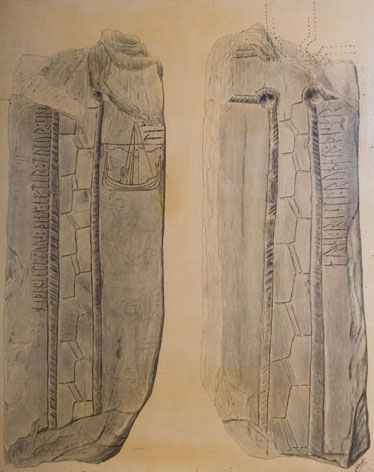
Image a

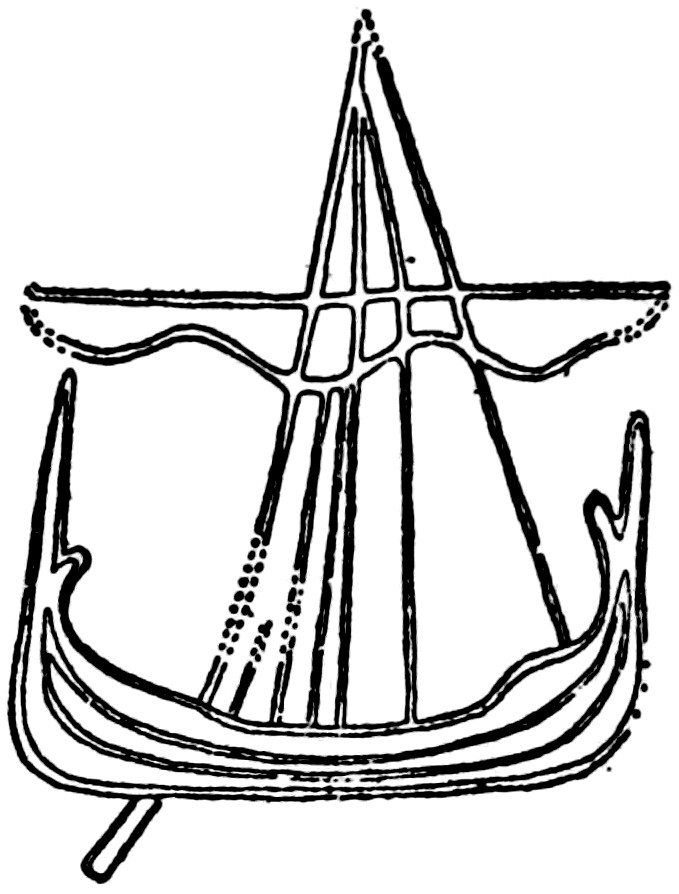
Image b

Maughold IV (image a; detail, image b), a Manx runestone displaying a contemporary sailing vessel. The power of the kings of the Isles laid in their armed galley-fleets. The inscription of the vessel may date from about the eleventh- to the thirteenth century. Surviving sources reveal that the powerful eleventh-century fleet of the kings of Dublin was a much sought-after military commodity.

According to the thirteenth-century Historia Gruffud vab Kenan, the mother of Cynan's son was Ragnailt ingen Amlaíb, a paternal granddaughter of Sitriuc. Further revealed by this source is the fact that this woman's father, Amlaíb mac Sitriuc, built and commanded a Welsh fortress called Castell Avloed. Although it is unknown how long the Dubliners possessed the fortress, in 1036 another son of Sitriuc was slain in Wales by an apparent kinsman, an event which could be evidence of a struggle for control of the site. Echmarcach's aforesaid expulsion of Sitriuc from Dublin in the same year could in turn indicate that this exiled monarch sought refuge in Wales.

Despite the uncertainty of its specific location, Castell Avloed appears to have been situated in territory formerly controlled by Iago, (Note: The precise location of this fortress is uncertain. It could have been situated in on the mainland in Gwynedd, or else on Anglesey at either Moel-y-don or Castell Bryn Gwyn.) and there is reason to suspect that—after Iago's fall and Cynan's flight—Ímar oversaw military actions against Gruffudd. Three years later, for example, the thirteenth- and fourteenth-century Brut y Tywysogyon and the "B" and "C" versions of the eleventh- to thirteenth-century Annales Cambriæ report that this Welsh king was captured by forces from Dublin. The episode is further elaborated upon by a sixteenth-century text compiled by David Powell and a seventeenth-century text by compiled by James Ware. According to these admittedly late versions of events, Gruffudd was captured by the Dubliners in the context of them supporting the cause of Cynan. The accounts further state that Gruffudd managed to escape his captors when the Dubliners were counterattacked by Welsh forces before they could return to Ireland. The evidence of Cynan cooperating with the Dubliners against Gruffudd suggests that, not only was Ímar personally involved as king, but that the Welsh fortress of Castell Avloed was still controlled by the Dubliners.

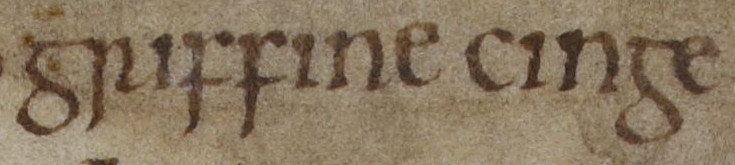
The name and title of Gruffudd ap Llywelyn as it appears on 163r of British Library Cotton Tiberius B I (the "C" version of the Anglo-Saxon Chronicle): "Griffine cinge".

Another conflict that could have involved Ímar and the military forces of Dublin was Gruffudd's final defeat of Hywel ab Edwin, King of Deheubarth. According to Brut y Tywysogyon and the "B" version of Annales Cambriæ this last stand of Hywel took place at the mouth of the River Tywi—perhaps in the vicinity of Carmarthen—and included Vikings from Ireland who supported Hywel's cause. It is apparent that Gruffudd's adversaries generally utilised foreign military support from Ireland's Viking enclaves. Certainly, the twelfth-century Book of Llandaff declares that Gruffudd struggled against English, Irish, and Vikings during his career.

== Ancestral figure ==
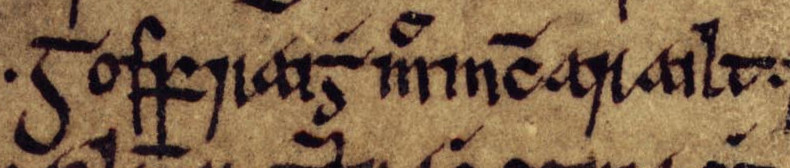
The name of Gofraid Crobán as it appears on folio 19v of Oxford Bodleian Library Rawlinson B 488: "Goffraidh mac Maic Arailt".

Ímar may have been the father, uncle, or possibly even the brother of Gofraid Crobán, King of Dublin and the Isles. In 1091, the Annals of Tigernach reveals that Gofraid possessed the kingship of Dublin in an annal-entry recording his patronym as "... mac Maic Arailt". The thirteenth- to fourteenth-century Chronicle of Mann, on the other hand, gives Gofraid's patronym as "... filius Haraldi nigri de Ysland". Whilst the former source identifies Gofraid as the son of a man named Aralt (Old Norse Haraldr), the latter identifies Gofraid as the paternal grandson of a man so named. (Note: The late mediaeval Welsh genealogical tract Achau Brenhinoedd a Thywysogion Cymru preserves a pedigree concerning an early thirteenth-century descendant of Gofraid, Ragnall mac Gofraid, King of the Isles. The pedigree runs: "Rhanallt m. Gwythryg ap Afloyd m. Gwrthryt Mearch m. Harallt Ddu m. Ifor Gamle m. Afloyd m. Swtrig". The "Gwrthryt Mearch" refers to Gofraid, whilst "Harallt Ddu" conforms to the chronicle's "Haraldi nigri de Ysland" (the Welsh du and Latin niger both mean "black"). The pedigree's "Ifor Gamle" appears to represent the Old Norse Ívarr gamli (the Old Norse gamli is a weak declension of gamall meaning "old"). An historical candidate for the pedigree's "Afloyd m. Swtrig" may be Amlaíb Cuarán, whose father was Sitriuc Cáech, King of Northumbria and Dublin. It is possible that the pedigree's "Ifor Gamle" represents Ímar himself. The fact that his father was named Aralt, however, could be evidence that the compiler of the pedigree either erroneously reversed the order of "Harallt Ddu" and "Ifor Gamle", or else missed an additional Aralt in the lineage.)

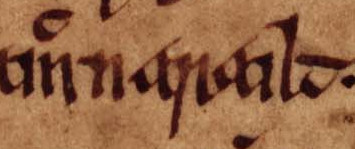
The patronym identifying Ímar on folio 17r of Oxford Bodleian Library Rawlinson B 488: "mac n-Arailt".

In the aforesaid record of the military actions conducted in 1044, Ímar is merely named as the son of Aralt, a fact which could indicate that this was how he was known to his contemporaries. If correct, the patronym preserved by the Chronicle of Mann could merely be a garbled form of this style.

The patronym given by the Chronicle of Mann states that Gofraid's father was from "Ysland", a place which could refer to either Iceland, Islay, or Ireland. Other than this passage, there is no evidence hinting of a connection between Gofraid and Iceland. The chronicle elsewhere states that Gofraid died on Islay, although the island's name is rendered "Ile" in this case. If "Ysland" instead refers to Ireland, the spelling could be the result of influence from a source originating in England, or a source written in Mediaeval French.

== Citations ==
Ímar mac Arailt Uí Ímair Died: 1054
Regnal titles
Preceded by Echmarcach mac Ragnaill	King of Dublin; 1038–1046	Succeeded by Echmarcach mac Ragnaill
