= Suibne mac Cináeda =

- King of the Gall Gaidheil
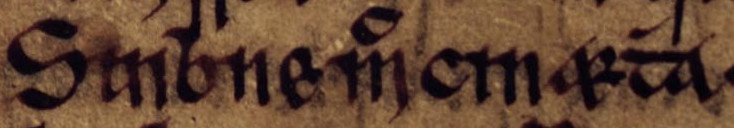
- Suibne's name as it appears on folio 16v of Oxford Bodleian Library MS Rawlinson B 488 (the Annals of Tigernach): "Suibne mac Cinaetha".
- Died: 1034
- House: possibly the Alpínid dynasty
- Father: possibly Cináed mac Maíl Choluim or Cináed mac Duib

Suibne mac Cináeda (died 1034) was an eleventh-century ruler of the Gall Gaidheil, a population of mixed Scandinavian and Gaelic ethnicity. (Note: Since the 1980s, academics have accorded Suibne various patronyms in English secondary sources: Suibhne mac Cináeda, Suibhne Mac Cinaedha, Suibhne mac Kenneth, Suibne mac Cinaeda, Suibne mac Cináeda, Suibne mac Cinaedh, and Sweeney mac Kenneth.) There is little known of Suibne as he is only attested in three sources that record the year of his death. He seems to have ruled in a region where Gall Gaidheil are known to have dwelt: either the Hebrides, the Firth of Clyde region, or somewhere along the south-western coast of Scotland from the Firth of Clyde southwards into Galloway.

Suibne's patronym, meaning "son of Cináed", may indicate that he was a member of the royal Alpínid dynasty. For instance, the patronym could be evidence that he was a brother of the reigning Máel Coluim mac Cináeda, King of Alba, or else a son of Cináed mac Duib, King of Alba. Suibne's career appears to have coincided with an expansion of the Gall Gaidheil along the south-west coast of what is today Scotland. This extension of power may have partially contributed to the destruction of the Kingdom of Strathclyde, an embattled realm which then faced aggressions from Dublin Vikings, Northumbrians, and Scots. The circumstances of Suibne's death are unknown, although one possibility could be that he was caught up in the vicious dynastic-strife endured by the Alpínids.

== Attestation ==
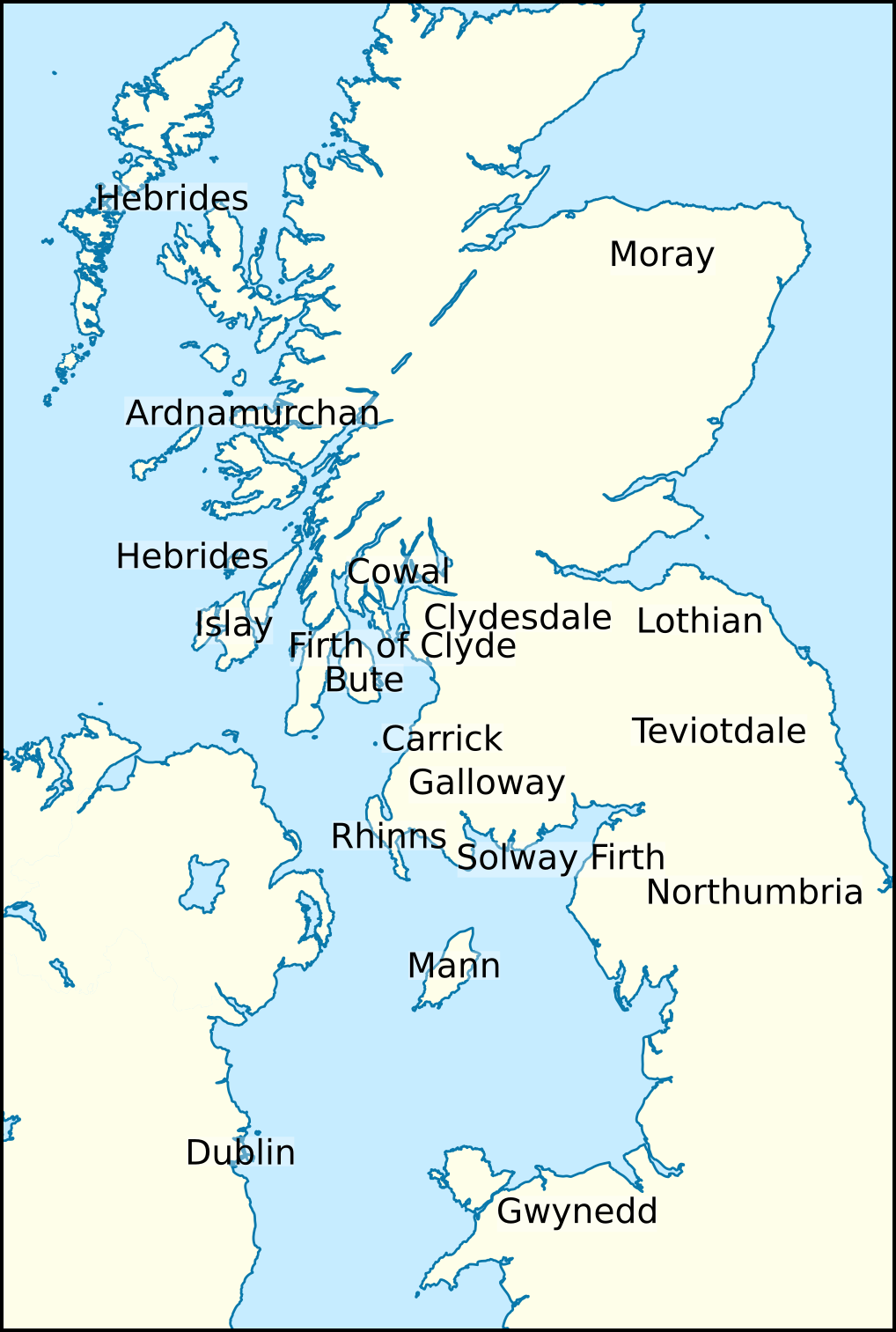
Locations relating to the life and times of Suibne.

Suibne's death is recorded in 1034 by the fifteenth- to sixteenth-century Annals of Ulster, the fourteenth-century Annals of Tigernach, and the sixteenth-century Annals of Loch Cé. These three sources accord him the title "ri Gall-Gaidhel", "rí Gall-Gáedel", and "rí Gall Goeidil". This style which could be evidence that Suibne ruled in either the Isles, Galloway, or somewhere along the south-western coast of Scotland north of the Solway Firth. In fact, little is certain of Suibne, as he is not attested by any other historical source.

The Gaelic Gaidheal (plural Gaidheil) is primarily a linguistic term referring to speakers of Gaelic. The Gaelic term Gall Gaidheil, literally meaning "Stranger-Gaidheil", first appears on record in the mid-ninth century. At this period in time, the term Gall (plural Gaill) referred to Scandinavians, which indicates that Gall Gaidheil should be taken to mean "Scandinavian-Gaidheil". The term appears to have been applied to a population of mixed Scandinavian and Gaelic ethnicity in the Hebrides and part of the former kingdom of Dál Riata. The leader of the Gall Gaidheil in the mid part of the century appears to have been a certain Caittil Find—possibly identical to Ketill Flatnefr of Scandinavian saga tradition—who may have been seated in the Hebrides. If the little that is known of Caittil and his connection with the Gall Gaidheil is correct, it could be evidence that Suibne was a Hebridean chieftain as well.

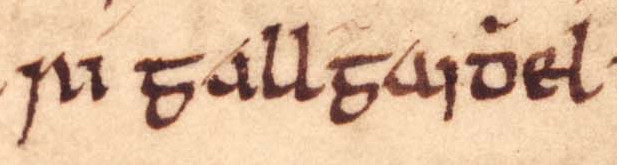
Suibne's title as it appears on folio 39r of Oxford Bodleian Library Rawlinson B 489 (the Annals of Ulster).

The Scottish place name Galloway—rendered in modern Gaelic Gall-Ghaidhealaibh—is derived from the Gaelic i nGall Gaidhealaib ("amongst the Gall Gaidheil"). The thirteenth-century Orkneyinga saga refers to Galloway in Old Norse as Gaddgeðlar, a name clearly derived from Gall Gaidheil. The region was certainly associated with the Gall Gaidheil earlier in the previous century. Specifically, two members of the region's ruling family—Roland fitz Uhtred and Alan fitz Roland—are styled by the Annals of Ulster as "rí Gall Gaidhel" ("King of the Gall Gaidheil") like Suibne himself. Although this title could suggest some sort of connection between Suibne and Galloway, there is no evidence of any familial link between him and the later Gallovidian rulers. In fact, it is only by the twelfth century, during the floruits of that earliest members of the Gallovidian ruling family, that the Gall Gaidheil terminology came to be territorially confined within the boundaries of Galloway.

== Context ==
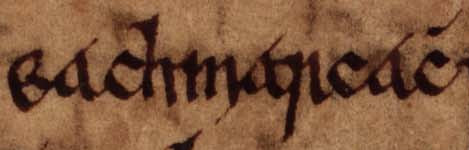
The name of Echmarcach mac Ragnaill, Suibne's contemporary and possible rival, as it appears on folio 17r of Oxford Bodleian Library Rawlinson B 488: "Eachmarcach".

If Suibne nevertheless ruled in Galloway, the notices of his death could be the first known instances of the term Gall Gaidheil in associated with the region. It would also mean that he was a precursor to the similarly styled Gallovidian rulers. A more-contemporary figure, Echmarcach mac Ragnaill, King of Dublin and the Isles, may well have ruled in Galloway as well, if the style "rex Innarenn", accorded to him by Marianus Scottus, means "King of the Rhinns", as opposed to the possible "King of the Isles". In about 1031, Echmarcach was one of several northern kings who convened with, and possibly submitted to, Knútr Sveinnsson, ruler of the Anglo-Scandinavian Empire comprising the kingdoms of Denmark, England, and Norway. If Suibne and Echmarcach were indeed associated with Galloway, Echmarcach's dealings with the English king—only a few years before the Suibne's death—could suggest that Echmarcach and Suibne were rivals within the region.

The original mainland territory of the Gall Gaidheil appears to have been much more expansive than Galloway. The ninth-century Félire Óengusso Céli Dé and the ninth-century Martyrology of Tallaght reveal that Bute, an island of the Firth of Clyde, was encompassed within the territory of the Gall Gaidheil. This evidence could indicate that the original territory of the Gall Gaidheil lay within the Firth of Clyde region and nearby Cowal. In the mediaeval period, the Rhinns appears have also included what is today known as the Machars. The entire region would have thus stretched from the North Channel to Wigtown Bay, and would have likely encompassed an area similar to the modern boundaries of Wigtownshire. The evidence of Echmarcach's authority in the Rhinns may reveal that much of what came to be known as Galloway was originally separate from the Gall Gaidheil territory. This could mean that the Rhinns was not part of the Gall Gaidheil territory during Suibne's floruit, and only came to be incorporated into these lands at a later date, perhaps the twelfth century.

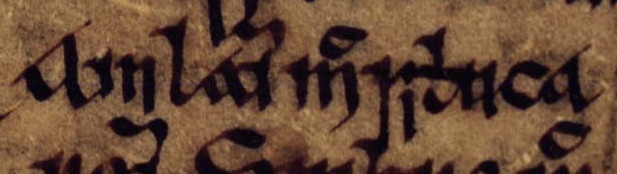
The name of Amlaíb mac Sitriuc, a nearby contemporary of Suibne, as it appears on folio 16v of Oxford Bodleian Library Rawlinson B 488: "Amlaim mac Sitriuca".

Another figure who may have held power in Galloway at about the time of Suibne's floruit was a particular son of Sitriuc mac Amlaíb, King of Dublin. (Note: Sitriuc had two sons named Amlaíb, and it is not certain if either ruled as a king. One of these like-named men died in 1012/1013, whilst the other died in 1034. Either man could have been Ragnailt's father.) According to the thirteenth-century Historia Gruffud vab Kenan, a son of Sitriuc named Amlaíb was the grandfather of Gruffudd ap Cynan, King of Gwynedd. If this source is to be believed, Amlaíb held royal power in the Rhinns and the territory of the Gall Gaidheil (amongst other places). The text makes a clear distinction between the Rhinns and the lands of the Gall Gaidheil, treating them as separate territories. (Note: A cognate text that similarly connects Amlaíb to these regions is the twelfth-century Vita Griffini filii Conani.) This suggests that the region encompassed within present-day Wigtownshire was regarded as distinct from the territory of the Gall Gaidheil in the eleventh century. The account may also be evidence that Amlaíb was a contemporary of Echmarcach and Suibne, and could indicate that he held power in Galloway and the Isles at some point between 1028 (the year his father set out upon a pilgrimage) and 1034 (a possible year of his death).

Simplified pedigree of Clann Custantín meic Cináeda, a branch of the ruling Alpínid dynasty of Alba. Either of the two highlighted men could have been Suibne's father.

Máel Coluim mac Domnaill (died 954)
Dub mac Maíl Choluim (died 966/967)	Cináed mac Maíl Choluim (died 995)
Cináed mac Duib (died 1005)	Máel Coluim mac Cináeda (died 1034)

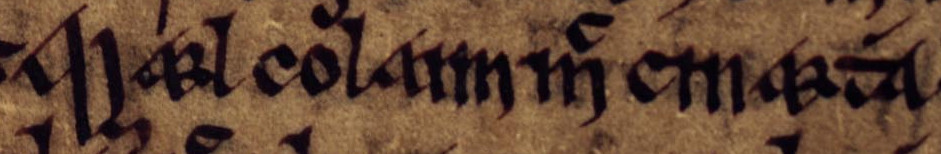
The name of Máel Coluim mac Cináeda, the reigning King of Alba and possible brother of Suibne, as it appears on folio 16v of Oxford Bodleian Library Rawlinson B 488: "Mael Colaim mac Cínaetha".

The patronym borne by Suibne is the same as that of the reigning Máel Coluim mac Cináeda, King of Alba. This patronym could be evidence that he and Máel Coluim were related. One possibility is that Suibne's patronym shows that he and Máel Coluim were brothers, and that Suibne had been placed upon the throne in a region occupied by the Gall Gaidheil. (Note: The name Suibne / Suibhne was borne by the progenitor of the mediaeval Scottish (later Irish) Clann Suibhne, but this man—Suibhne mac Duinn Shléibhe—seems to have been a much later and unconnected figure. Although pedigrees concerning the Scottish Clann Domhnaill note an apparent eleventh-century ancestor with the name, the names that these sources give for this particular man's father are nothing like the personal name Cináed. Potential evidence against the possibility that Suibne was a member of the Scottish royal family is the fact that no other member of this family—the Alpínid dynasty—is known to have borne the personal name Suibne.) In support of such an act is the fact that the twelfth-century Prophecy of Berchán associates Máel Coluim with Islay and Arran, (Note: The text reads "biodhba Bretan, bádhudh Gall, loingseach Íle is Arann". One possible interpretation of this source is that it is evidence that Máel Coluim was forced to flee to the islands by his rival kinsman, Cináed mac Duib, King of Alba. Another interpretation is that it refers to a military campaign conducted against the islands. The initial clause, certainly appears to refer to violence, as it describes Máel Coluim as "enemy of Britons" and "battler of Gaill".) and the claim by Ailred, Abbot of Rievaulx that Gallovidians were vassals of Máel Coluim's eventual successor Máel Coluim mac Donnchada, King of Alba. Máel Coluim certainly extended Scottish royal authority southwards into Lothian, and Strathclyde. If he had indeed managed to insert a brother into Galloway it could suggest that he possessed overlordship there as well, perhaps after his annexation of the former kingdom of Strathclyde. The notices of Suibne's demise, therefore, could be the first record of Scottish control of regions south-west of the River Clyde. If Suibne and Máel Coluim were not brothers, Suibne's patronym could instead be evidence that he was a son of Cináed mac Duib, King of Alba. This could mean that Máel Coluim allowed Suibne to reign over the Gall Gaidheil as a way of restraining him from claiming the kingship of Alba.

Excerpt from folio 131v of GKS 1005 fol (Flateyarbók): "Gaddgedlar". The excerpt refers to eleventh-century Galloway. The Old Norse Gaddgeðlar is derived from Gall Gaidheil.

There is reason to suspect that the eleventh-century decline and demise of the Cumbrian realm of Strathclyde could have been connected with the expansion of the Gall Gaidheil. One of the last recorded members of this kingdom's royal family was Owain Foel, King of Strathclyde, a man who lent military assistance to Máel Coluim against the Northumbrians in 1018. It is conceivable that Gall Gaidheil encroachment into Cumbrian territory was initiated upon Owain Foel's own demise. Máel Coluim could have also seized upon this man's death, claiming the Cumbrian kingship for himself.

One possibility is that Suibne, as King of the Gall Gaidheil, was personally responsible for the conquest of western maritime region of the Cumbrians. In fact, the Annals of Tigernach record a ravaging inflicted upon Britons in 1030 by both the Gaill of Dublin and the English. Since this violent episode receives no corroboration from English and Welsh sources, such as the ninth- to twelfth-century Anglo-Saxon Chronicle and the eleventh- to thirteenth-century Annales Cambriæ, it is possible that the recorded attack relates to the Cumbrians rather than the Welsh. (Note: The Cumbrians and the Welsh were both known as Britons. Although the twelfth-century Historia regum Anglorum states that Eadwulf of Bamburgh attacked Britons in 1038, it is not clear where these Britons were located. It is possible that these particular people were under Gall Gaidheil overlordship. The attack itself may have been the subject of a particular prímscél ("chief tale")—Argain Sratha Cluada—that is mentioned by the thirteenth-century Book of Leinster. Owain Foel, unlike his immediate royal predecessors, is accorded the title "rex Clutinensium" ("King of the Clydesmen"), a style that may reflect the diminishment of his domain at the hands of his neighbours.) The claim by Historia Gruffud vab Kenan—that Sitriuc's son held power in the Rhinns amongst other regions—could be further evidence that the Cumbrians suffered from attacks by the Dubliners. Such incursions could well have been coordinated with the Gall Gaidheil. Alternately, if Suibne and Máel Coluim were indeed brothers, another possibility is that Suibne's title is evidence that Máel Coluim mac Cináeda seized upon the vacated Cumbrian kingship and installed Suibne as king over the Cumbrians. Such a move may explain the Scots' failure to immediately exploit their victory over the Northumbrians, and could indicate that Máel Coluim's resources were instead projected against the vulnerable Cumbrian realm.

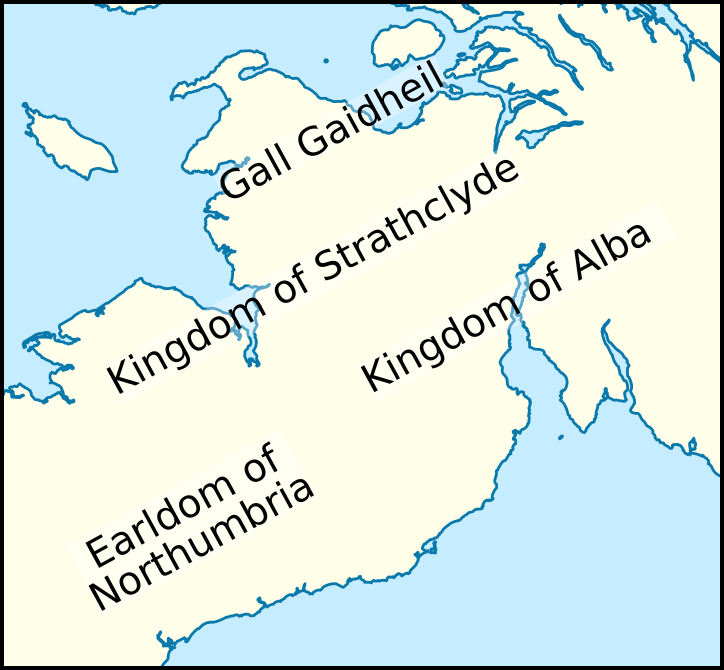
Image a

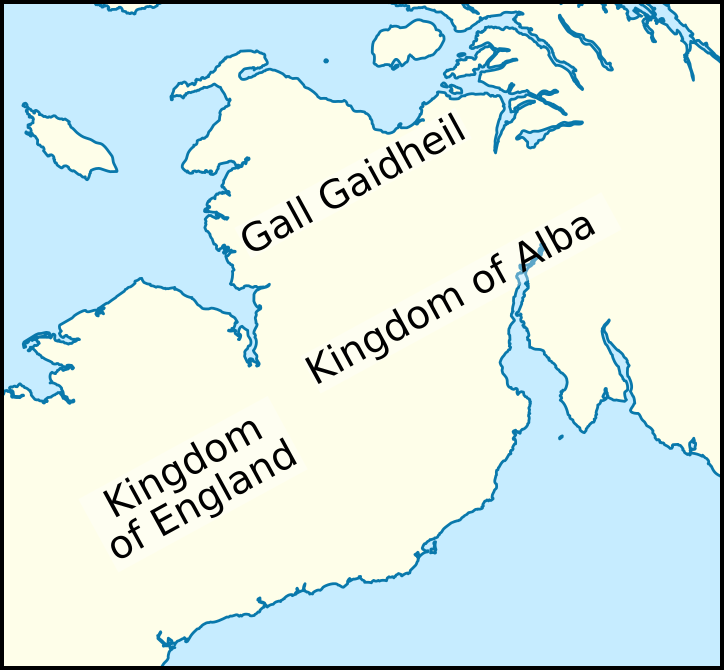
Image b

The Kingdom of Strathclyde in relation to its neighbours in the early eleventh century (image a). The political alignment in the wake of the realm's demise later in the century (image b).

Echmarcach's meeting with Knútr included two other kings: Máel Coluim and the Moravian ruler, Mac Bethad mac Findlaích. Although Máel Coluim and Mac Bethad appear to have been related, the nature of the relationship between Máel Coluim and Echmarcach is uncertain. If Suibne was indeed a brother of the Scottish king, and ruled in Galloway at his behest, it could be evidence that Echmarcach was another client-king of Máel Coluim. In fact, the agreement with Knútr could indicate that Máel Coluim enjoyed overlordship over Mac Bethad and Echmarcach. If so, and if Máel Coluim indeed held power in the southern Hebrides as the Prophecy of Berchán seems to suggest, Echmarcach's realm may have encompassed Mann, the Rhinns, and only the Hebridean islands north of the Ardnamurchan peninsula. If Suibne and Máel Coluim were indeed brothers, and the former owed his authority amongst the Gall Gaidheil to the power of the Scottish Crown, it is even possible that the Scots expelled Echmarcach from the Isles at some point between the concord with Knútr and Suibne's death as king.

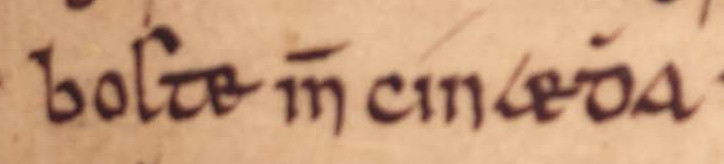
The name of Boite mac Cináeda, a man who may have been a brother of Suibne, as it appears on folio 39r of Oxford Bodleian Library Rawlinson B 489.

Another possibility dependent upon kinship between Máel Coluim and Suibne concerns the fact that both men died within the same year. The former was the final member of the Alpínid dynasty to rule the Kingdom of Scotland, and was succeeded by his maternal-grandson, Donnchad ua Maíl Choluim. In the later stages of his career, Máel Coluim seems to have taken steps to remove potential threats to the royal succession, and in this context appears to have orchestrated the assassination of the son or grandson of a certain Boite mac Cináeda in 1033. Not only is the exact identity of this man uncertain—as he could have been either a brother or cousin of Máel Coluim (Note: For example, Boite could have been a son of Cináed mac Duib, Máel Coluim's first cousin.)—but Máel Coluim himself died under obscure circumstances. If Máel Coluim and Suibne were indeed brothers, the deaths of both men within the same year could well be connected, and could be evidence of conflict between the kings, with Suibne himself dying in battle against Máel Coluim. If Suibne was instead a son of Cináed mac Duib, Máel Coluim's move to eliminate a rival line to the succession could further evince an accommodation between Máel Coluim and Suibne in regard to the kingship. In any event, if Suibne had no familial connection with the later rulers of Galloway, it is possible that his kingdom or sub-kingdom died with him.
