= Ragnall ua Ímair, King of Waterford =

Ragnall ua Ímair
- King of Waterford
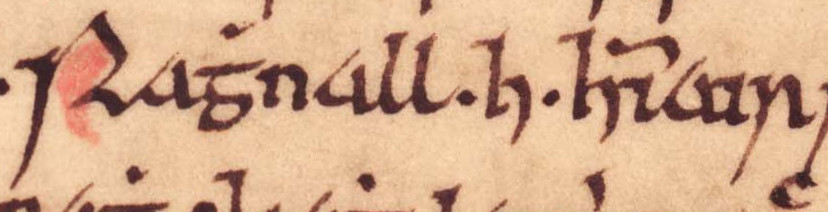
- Ragnall's name as it appears on folio 39r of Oxford Bodleian Library Rawlinson B 489.
- Reign: 1022–1035
- Predecessor: Sitriuc mac Ímair
- Died: 1035
- Dynasty: Uí Ímair (probably)

Ragnall ua Ímair (died 1035), also known as Ragnall mac Ragnaill, (Note: Also known as Ragnall Ua Ímair, and Røgnvaldr Røgnvaldarson.) was an eleventh-century King of Waterford. He appears to have ruled as king from 1022 to 1035, the year of his death.

== Family ==
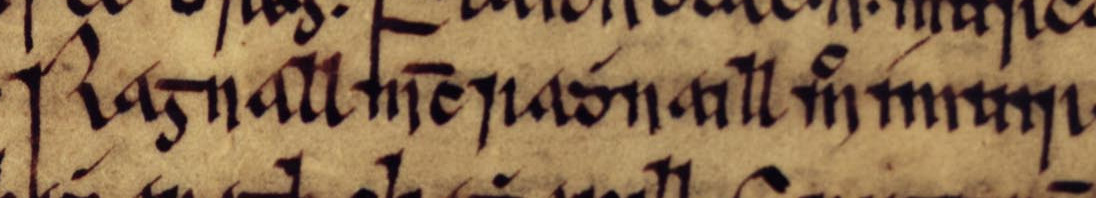
Ragnall's name as it appears on folio 16v of Oxford Bodleian Library Rawlinson B 488 (the Annals of Tigernach): "Ragnall mac Raghnaill meic Ímuir".

Ragnall seems to have been a descendant of Ímar, King of Waterford. Ragnall's father may have been Ragnall mac Ímair, King of Waterford. Such a relationship would indicate that the patronym ua Ímair—accorded to Ragnall by the Irish Annals that note his death—refers to Ragnall mac Ímair's father, the aforesaid Ímar. (Note: If, on the other hand, Ragnall was not a son of Ragnall mac Ímair, another possibility is that he was the son of Ragnall mac Gofraid, King of the Isles.)

== Reign and death ==
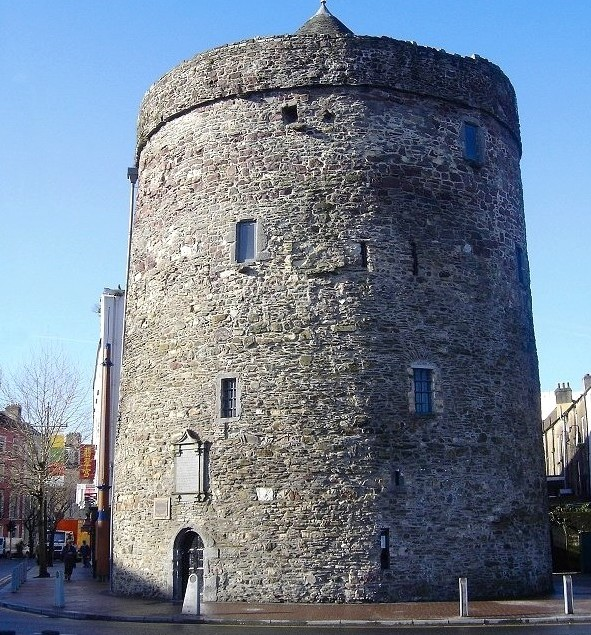
Although Reginald's Tower in Waterford was built by Anglo-Normans, it likely sits upon an earlier Viking Age fort, and seems to be named after one of the rulers of Waterford who bore a form of the name Ragnall.

Very little is known of the Waterfordian kingship in the early eleventh century. Ímar died in 1000. His son, the aforesaid Ragnall mac Ímair, died as king in 1018. Another son of Ímar, Sitriuc mac Ímair, King of Waterford was slain by the King of Osraige in 1022. An apparent brother of Ragnall died in 1015. Ragnall himself appears to have ruled Waterford from 1022 to 1035. The seventeenth-century Annals of the Four Masters, the fourteenth-century Annals of Tigernach, and the fifteenth- to sixteenth-century Annals of Ulster reveal that, in 1035, Ragnall was slain by Sitriuc mac Amlaíb, King of Dublin.

The following year, Sitriuc mac Amlaíb was driven out of Dublin by Echmarcach mac Ragnaill. Whilst the parentage of the latter is uncertain, if he was a related to Ragnall—perhaps as either a brother or son—it could mean that Echmarcach's actions against Sitriuc mac Amlaíb were undertaken in revenge for his death. Against this possibility is the fact that there is no evidence that Echmarcach, or his known family, had any connection with Waterford. Whatever the case, Ragnall's fall appears to have been an important benchmark in Waterford's history, and after this date the enclave increasingly fell prey to the machinations of the Uí Briain and the Uí Cheinnselaig. In fact, two years after the killing, the King of Waterford was Cú Inmain ua Robann, an apparent Irishman.
