= Echmarcach mac Ragnaill =

- King of Dublin and the Isles
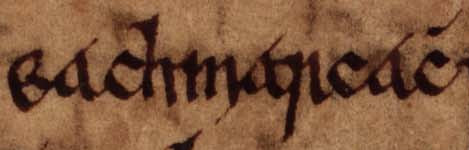
- Echmarcach's name as it appears on folio 17r of Oxford Bodleian Library Rawlinson B 488 (the Annals of Tigernach): "Eachmarcach".

King of Dublin
- Reign: 1036–1038
- Predecessor: Sitriuc mac Amlaíb
- Successor: Ímar mac Arailt

King of Dublin
- Reign: 1046–1052
- Predecessor: Ímar mac Arailt
- Successor: Diarmait mac Maíl na mBó
- Died: 1064/1065; Rome
- Issue: Mór
- House: probably Uí Ímair

Echmarcach mac Ragnaill (died 1064/1065) was a dominant figure in the eleventh-century Irish Sea region. (Note: Since the 1980s, academics have accorded Echmarcach various patronymic names in English secondary sources: Echmarcach mac Ragnaill, Echmarcach Mac Ragnaill, Echmarcach mac Ragnaill mic Gofraid, Echmarcach Ragnallson, Echmarcach Ragnallsson, Echmarcach Rǫgnvaldsson, Echmarcach Rögnvaldsson, and Echmarcach Røgnvaldsson.) At his height, he reigned as king over Dublin, the Isles, and perhaps the Rhinns of Galloway. The precise identity of Echmarcach's father, Ragnall, is uncertain. One possibility is that this man was one of two eleventh-century rulers of Waterford. Another possibility is that Echmarcach's father was an early eleventh-century ruler of the Isles. If any of these identifications are correct, Echmarcach may have been a member of the Uí Ímair kindred.

Echmarcach first appears on record in about 1031, when he was one of three kings in northern Britain who submitted to Knútr Sveinnsson, ruler of the Anglo-Scandinavian Empire. Echmarcach is recorded to have ruled over Dublin in 1036–1038 and 1046–1052. After losing Dublin for the final time, he appears to have been seated in the Isles on Mann. In 1061, about a decade after his final defeat in Dublin, Echmarcach appears to have been expelled from the Isles, and may have then fallen back into Galloway.

Echmarcach appears to have forged an alliance with the powerful Uí Briain. A leading member of this kindred, Donnchad mac Briain, King of Munster, was married to Cacht ingen Ragnaill, a woman who could have been closely related to Echmarcach. Certainly, Echmarcach's daughter, Mór, married one of Donnchad's Uí Briain close kinsmen. Echmarcach's violent career brought him into bitter conflict with a particular branch of the Uí Ímair who had held Dublin periodically from the early eleventh century. This branch was supported by the rising Uí Cheinnselaig, an Irish kindred responsible for Echmarcach's final expulsion from Dublin and apparently Mann as well.

In about 1064, having witnessed much of his formerly expansive sea-kingdom fall into the hands of the Uí Cheinnselaig, Echmarcach accompanied Donnchad—a man who was himself deposed—upon a pilgrimage to Rome. Possibly aged about sixty-five at this point in his life, it was here that Echmarcach died, in either 1064 or 1065. In the decades following his demise, the Uí Briain used Echmarcach's descendants as a means to dominate and control Dublin and the Isles. One of his grandsons eventually ruled as king.

== Uncertain parentage ==
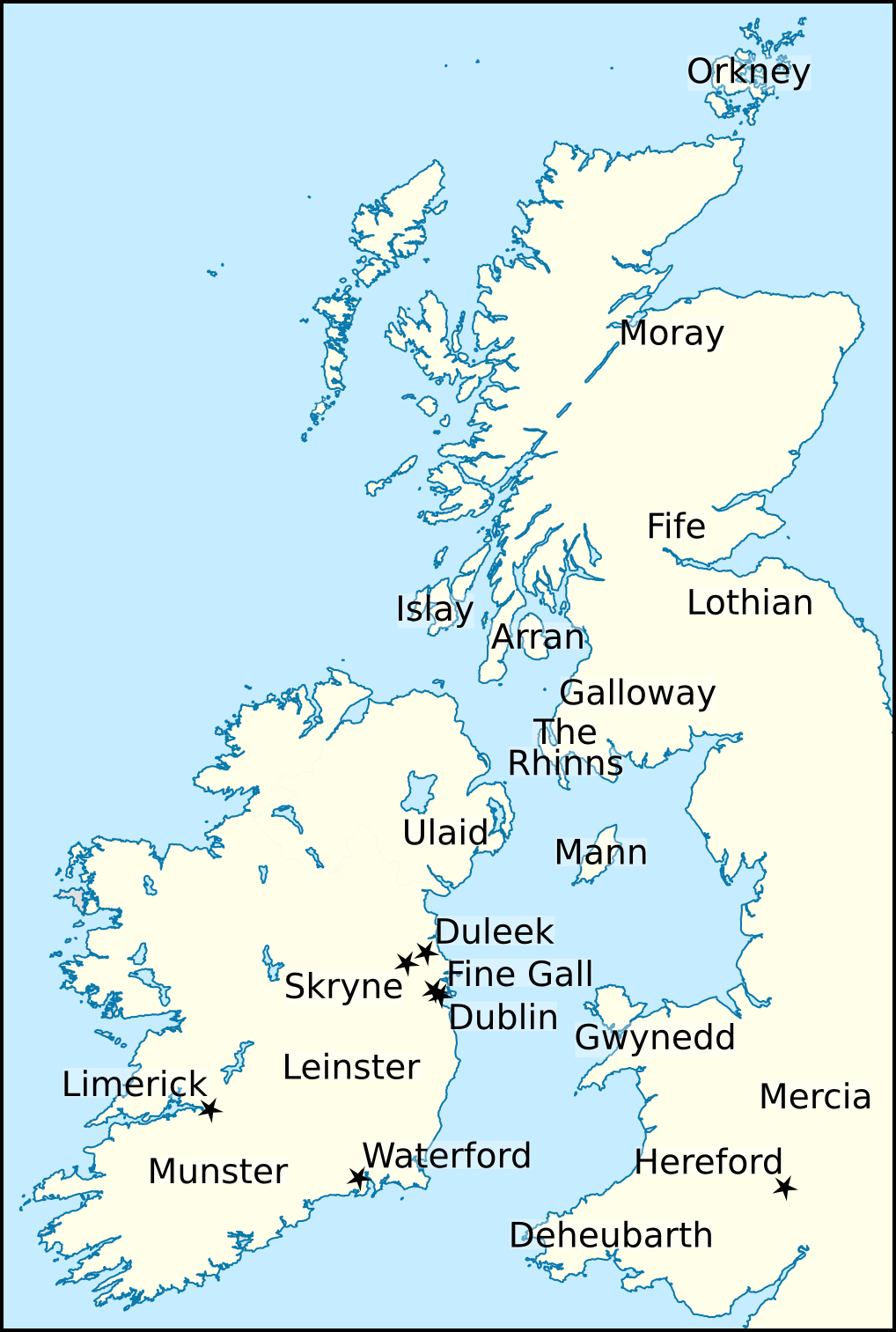
Locations relating to Echmarcach and his contemporaries in Britain and Ireland.

Echmarcach was the son of a man named Ragnall. Whilst Echmarcach bore a Gaelic name, the name of his father is ultimately derived from Old Norse, a fact that serves to exemplify the hybrid nature of the eleventh-century Irish Sea region, The identity of Echmarcach's father is uncertain. (Note: One identification, dating to the nineteenth century, is that Echmarcach's father was Ragnall mac Amlaíb, son of Amlaíb Cuarán, King of Northumbria and Dublin. The fact that Echmarcach was active until the 1060s appears to be evidence against such a relationship.) One possibility is that Ragnall was a member of the dynasty that ruled the Norse-Gaelic enclave of Waterford in tenth- and eleventh centuries. If so, Echmarcach may have been the son of one of two Waterfordian rulers: Ragnall mac Ímair, King of Waterford, or this man's apparent son, Ragnall ua Ímair, King of Waterford. Another possibility is that Echmarcach belonged to a family from the Isles, and that his father was Ragnall mac Gofraid, King of the Isles, son and possible successor of Gofraid mac Arailt, King of the Isles. As a descendant of either of the aforesaid families, Echmarcach would appear to have been a member of the Uí Ímair, (Note: Gofraid mac Arailt's father appears to have been Aralt mac Sitriuc, King of Limerick, great-grandson of the eponymous ancestor of the Uí Ímair. An alternate possibility is that Gofraid mac Arailt's father was Hagroldus, a Danish chieftain from Normandy, unrelated to the Uí Ímair. The Waterford dynasty descended from Ímar, King of Waterford. Although the parentage of this man is unknown, the names borne his kin, and the known events surrounding the dynasty itself, suggest that the family was a branch of the Uí Ímair.) a royal dynasty descended from the Scandinavian sea-king Ímar.

== Echmarcach and the imperium of Knútr Sveinnsson ==
=== Knútr and the three kings ===
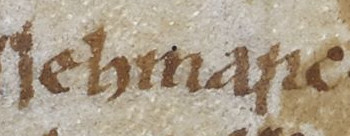
Echmarcach's name as it appears on folio 67r of British Library Cotton Domitian A VIII (the "F" version of the Anglo-Saxon Chronicle): "Iehmarc".

Echmarcach appears to first emerge in the historical record in the first half of the eleventh century, when he was one of the three kings who met with Knútr Sveinnsson, ruler of the Anglo-Scandinavian Empire comprising the kingdoms of Denmark, England, and Norway. The event itself is noted by Knútsdrápa, a contemporary drápa composed by Sigvatr Þórðarson, an eleventh-century Icelandic skald. Although Sigvatr's composition fails to identify the three kings by name, it does reveal that Knútr met them in Fife. The ninth- to twelfth-century Anglo-Saxon Chronicle also notes the meeting. The "D" version of the chronicle records that Knútr went to Rome in 1031, and soon after travelled to Scotland where he received the submission of an unnamed Scottish king. The later "E" version provides more information, stating that, after his return from Rome in 1031, Knútr went to Scotland and received the submission of three kings named: "Mælcolm", "Mælbæþe", and "Iehmarc". The latter name appears to be a phonetic form of the Gaelic Echmarcach, a relatively uncommon name. The three men almost certainly refer to: Máel Coluim mac Cináeda, King of Scotland, Mac Bethad mac Findlaích, and Echmarcach himself. (Note: Iehmarc (Echmarcach) is sometimes mistakenly identified as a figure who appears in mediaeval and early modern genealogies concerning Clan Donald. The confusion results from a nineteenth-century misreading of one such pedigree in the fourteenth-century Book of Ballymote. This misreading gives "Imergi" instead of what actually reads "Indergi".)

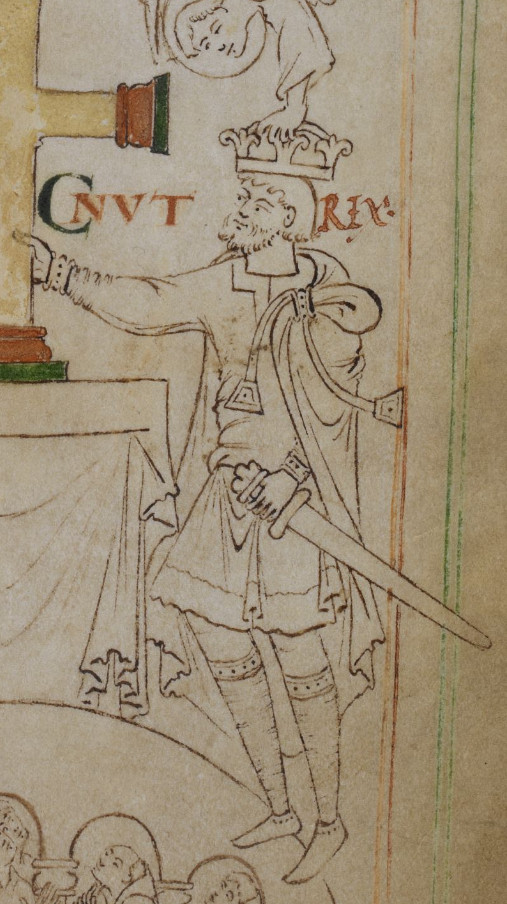
Depiction of Knútr as it appears on folio 6r of British Library Stowe 944.

Of the three kings, Máel Coluim appears to have been the most powerful, and it is possible that Mac Bethad and Echmarcach were underkings or client kings of his. Mac Bethad appears to have become Mormaer of Moray in 1032 after the slaying of his kinsman, Gilla Comgáin mac Máel Brigti, Mormaer of Moray. Previous rulers of Moray are sometimes styled as kings by various Irish annals, a fact which may explain why Mac Bethad was called a king when he met Knútr. Although the apparent date of Mac Bethad's accession to the mormaership (1032) appears to contradict the date of the kings' meeting (1031), this discrepancy can be accounted for in two ways. One possibility is that Gilla Comgáin was actually slain in 1031 but only recorded in 1032. Another possibility is that Knútr merely returned from Rome in 1031, but actually met with the kings in 1032, after Gilla Comgáin's demise and Mac Bethad's accession. There is further evidence that could cast doubt on the date of the meeting. Although the aforesaid versions of the Anglo-Saxon Chronicle date Knútr's pilgrimage to 1031, he is otherwise known to have visited Rome in 1027. Whilst it is possible he undertook two pilgrimages during his career, it is more likely that the chronicle has misdated his journey. In fact, it is possible that the chronicle failed to account for the time in which Knútr spent on the continent and Scandinavia after having visited Rome.

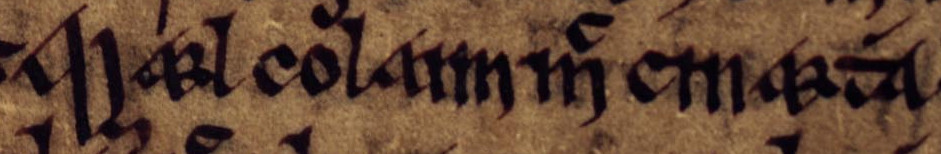
The name of Máel Coluim mac Cináeda as it appears on folio 16v of Oxford Bodleian Library Rawlinson B 488: "Mael Colaim mac Cínaetha". Máel Coluim reigned as King of Scotland from 1005 to 1034, and may have been an overlord or opponent of Echmarcach.

Further confusion about Knútr in Scottish affairs comes from a continental source. At some point before about 1030, the eleventh-century Historiarum libri quinque, by Rodulfus Glaber, records that Knútr fought a long campaign against Máel Coluim, and that hostilities were finally brought to a close by the intervention of Knútr's wife, Emma, and her brother, Richard II, Duke of Normandy. If Rodulfus' account is to be believed, this conflict must have taken place before Richard's death in 1026, and could refer to events surrounding Máel Coluim's violent annexation of Lothian early in Knútr's reign. Despite uncertainties surrounding the reliability of Rodulfus' version of events, unless the Anglo-Saxon Chronicle has misdated Knútr's meeting in Scotland, Rodulfus' account could be evidence that Knútr involved himself with Scottish affairs before and after 1026.

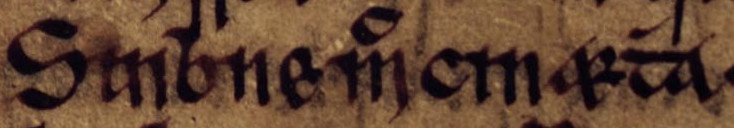
The name of Suibne mac Cináeda as it appears on folio 16v of Oxford Bodleian Library Rawlinson B 488: "Suibne mac Cinaetha". Suibne was a neighbouring contemporary of Echmarcach. The latter's dealings with the three kings could indicate he and Suibne were rivals along the western seaboard of Scotland.

The record of Echmarcach in company with Máel Coluim and Mac Bethad could indicate that he was in some sense a 'Scottish' ruler, and that his powerbase was located in the Isles. Such an orientation could add weight to the possibility that Echmarcach was descended from Ragnall mac Gofraid. As for Máel Coluim, his influence in the Isles may be evidenced by the twelfth-century Prophecy of Berchán, which could indicate that he resided or exerted power in the Hebrides, specifically on the Inner Hebridean islands of Arran and Islay. Further evidence of Máel Coluim's influence in the Isles may be preserved by the fifteenth- to sixteenth-century Annals of Ulster and the fourteenth-century Annals of Tigernach which record the death of a certain Suibne mac Cináeda in 1034. These particular sources style Suibne "ri Gall-Gaidhel" and "rí Gall-Gáedel". The Gaelic Gaidheal (plural Gaidheil) is primarily a linguistic term referring to speakers of Gaelic. The Gaelic term Gall Gaidheil, literally meaning "Stranger-Gaidheil", was attributed to the population of mixed Scandinavian and Gaelic ethnicity in the Hebrides. The fact that Máel Coluim and Suibne died the same year and share patronyms could be evidence that they were brothers. If the two were indeed closely related, Suibne may have been set up by Máel Coluim as a subordinate in an area of Scandinavian settlement. One possibility is that the account of Máel Coluim preserved by the Prophecy of Berchán could be evidence that this region encompassed the lands surrounding Kintyre and the Outer Clyde. This source, combined with the other accounts of Knútr's meeting, could indicate that Máel Coluim was then overlord of the Isles.

=== Context of the concordat with Knútr ===
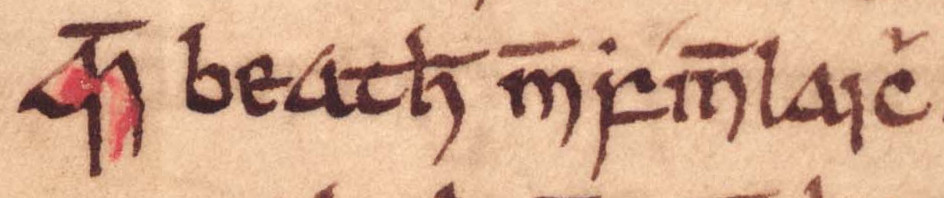
The name of Mac Bethad mac Findlaích as it appears on folio 41v of Oxford Bodleian Library Rawlinson B 489 (the Annals of Ulster). Mac Bethad was a powerful figure in north-eastern Scotland.

The rationale behind the meeting of the four kings is uncertain. One possibility is that it was related to Máel Coluim's annexation of Lothian, a region that likely encompassed an area roughly similar to the modern boundaries of Berwickshire, East Lothian, and possibly parts of Mid Lothian. The considerable span of years between this conquest and Knútr's meeting, however, could suggest that there were other factors. There appears to be evidence that the violent regime change in Moray (which enabled Mac Bethad to assume the mormaership) prompted Knútr to meet with the kings. Echmarcach and Máel Coluim may thus have been bound to keep the peace with Mac Bethad's troubled lordship. Certainly, the accounts of the Anglo-Saxon Chronicle record that Knútr met the kings in "Scotland", a region that likely refers to land north of Firth of Forth. Another possibility is that Máel Coluim aimed to gain Knútr's neutrality in a Scottish campaign against Mac Bethad, and sought naval support from Echmarcach himself. The absence of the King of Strathclyde from the assembled kings, and the possibility that Echmarcach's powerbase was situated somewhere in the Isles beyond Kintyre, could indicate that Knútr's main focus was on the troubled region of Moray, and the rulers whose lands it bordered. Another possibility is that the nonappearance of a Strathclyde representative is evidence that this Cumbrian realm had been recently annexed by the Scots which in turn drew a response from Knútr.

Knútr may have sought the submission of the assembled kings in an attempt to protect his northern borders. (Note: The twelfth-century Gesta regum Anglorum places Knútr's journey to Scotland in the context of subduing a Scottish rebellion.) Additionally, he may have sought to prevent these kings from allowing military aid to reach potential challengers to his authority. If Echmarcach's father was indeed a son of Ragnall mac Gofraid, it would have meant that he was a nephew of Lagmann mac Gofraid. The latter was closely associated with Óláfr Haraldsson, and together both lent military assistance to Richard II in the early eleventh century. There is also evidence to suggest that the predecessors of Ragnall mac Gofraid and Lagmann possessed connections with the Normans. In consequence, there is reason to suspect that Knútr sought to counter a potential association between Echmarcach and Richard II. Knútr and Óláfr were certainly at odds. In 1028, only a few years before the meeting of kings, Knútr seized control of Norway after defeating Óláfr. Knútr proceeded to appoint his own nephew, Hákon Eiríksson, as regent in Norway. Unfortunately for Knútr, Hákon perished at sea in late 1029 or early 1030. About three years later, Knútr's overlordship in Norway was challenged by a certain Tryggvi Óláfsson. This man seemingly possessed connections with Dublin and the Isles, as saga-tradition appears to reveal that his mother, Gyða, was a daughter of Amlaíb Cuarán. Although Tryggvi apparently enjoyed considerable local support when he landed in Norway in about 1033, he was nonetheless overwhelmed by forces loyal to Knútr and killed. Tryggvi is unlikely to have been Knútr's only challenger, and the episode itself evinces the way in which potential threats to Knútr could emerge from the Scandinavian settlements in Britain and Ireland.

The army had to obey the ring-harmer from Þursasker to Dublin;
I tell people truly how Þorfinnr was regarded.

— translated excerpt from Þorfinnsdrápa, composed by Arnórr Þórðarson. Throughout the drápa, Arnórr lists Þórfinnr's military exploits and concludes with this stanza emphasizing the latter's far-reaching influence. The term "ring-harmer" or "harmer of rings" is a kenning for "king", "(generous) ruler", or "generous man", whilst "Þursasker" may refer to rocks off Shetland—perhaps Muckle Flugga or the Outer Skerries—or rocks off Thurso Bay.

Close connections between the rulers of Orkney and the family of Óláfr may well have posed a potential threat to Knútr. The concordat between Knútr and the three kings could, therefore, have been a calculated attempt to disrupt the spread of Orcadian power, and an attempt to block possible Orcadian intervention into Norway. Specifically, Knútr may have wished to curb the principal Orcadian, Þórfinnr Sigurðarson, Earl of Orkney. In fact, Þórfinnr appears to have been in open conflict with Mac Bethad. This violence may be evidenced by (chronologically suspect) saga-tradition, which appears to indicate that Mac Bethad and his father warred with Orcadian earls. (Note: Further evidence of hostilities between Mac Bethad and the Orcadian comital family may be the account of warring between Þórfinnr and a certain Karl Hundason preserved by the thirteenth-century Orkneyinga Saga. The exact identity of Karl is uncertain. One possibility is that this figure represents Mac Bethad himself.) Saga-tradition may also reveal that Echmarcach suffered from Þórfinnr's military advances. For example, the thirteenth-century Orkneyinga saga states that, after Þórfinnr's consolidation of Orkney and Caithness—an action that likely took place after the death of his brother Brúsi—Þórfinnr was active in the Isles, parts of Galloway and Scotland, and even Dublin. The saga also reveals that Brúsi's son, Rǫgnvaldr, arrived in Orkney at a time when Þórfinnr was preoccupied with the after-effects of such campaigns, as it states that he was "much occupied" with men from the Isles and Ireland. Another source, Óláfs saga helga, preserved within the thirteenth-century saga-compilation Heimskringla, claims that Þórfinnr exerted power in Scotland and Ireland, and that he controlled a far-flung lordship which encompassed Orkney, Shetland, and the Hebrides. Further evidence of Þórfinnr's activities in the region may be preserved by Þórfinnsdrápa, composed by the contemporary Icelandic skald Arnórr Þórðarson, which declares that Þórfinnr raided throughout the Irish Sea region as far south as Dublin.

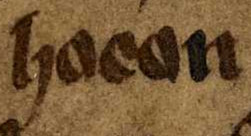
The name of Hákon Eiríksson as it appears on folio 11v of AM 325 II 4to (Ágrip af Nóregskonungasǫgum): "Hǫ́kon".

It is possible that Knútr took other actions to contain Orkney. Evidence that Knútr installed Hákon as overlord of the Isles may be preserved by the twelfth-century Ágrip af Nóregskonungasǫgum. The historicity of this event is uncertain, however, and Hákon's authority in the Isles is not attested by any other source. Be that as it may, this twelfth-century text states that Hákon had been sent into the Isles by Óláfr, and that Hákon ruled the region for the rest of his life. The chronology outlined by this source suggests that Hákon left Norway at about the time Óláfr assumed the kingship in 1016. The former is certainly known to have been in Knútr's service soon afterwards in England. One possibility is that Knútr installed Hákon as overlord of Orkney and the Isles in about 1016/1017, before handing him possession of the Earldom of Worcester in about 1017. If this was the case, Hákon would have been responsible for not only a strategic part of the Anglo-Welsh frontier, but also accountable for the far-reaching sea-lanes that stretched from the Irish Sea region to Norway. It seems likely that Knútr was more concerned about Orkney and the Isles, and the security of the sea-lanes around Scotland, than surviving sources let on. Hákon's death at sea would have certainly been a cause of concern for Knútr's regime, and could have been directly responsible to the meeting between him and the three kings. If Hákon had indeed possessed overlordship of the Isles, his demise could well have paved the way for Echmarcach's own rise to power. Having come to terms with the three kings, it is possible that Knútr relied upon Echmarcach to counter the ambitions of the Orcadians, who could have attempted to seize upon Hákon's fall and renew their influence in the Isles.

== Uí Briain alliance and the conquest of Dublin ==
Simplified family tree illustrating familial connections between Echmarcach and the Uí Briain kindred. Women are italicised. It is uncertain how or if Cacht ingen Ragnaill was related to Echmarcach. Diarmait mac Maíl na mBó and his son Murchad were opponents of Echmarcach, whilst Donnchad mac Briain appears to have accompanied Echmarcach upon a pilgrimage.

Brian Bóruma (d. 1014); K of Ireland
Cacht (d. 1054)	Donnchad (d. 1064); K of Munster	Tadc (d. 1023)	Echmarcach (d. 1064/1065); K of Dublin and the Isles
Toirdelbach (d. 1086); K of Munster	Diarmait (died 1072); K of Leinster and Dublin
Tadc (d. 1086)	Mór	Murchad (died 1070); K of Dublin and the Isles
Donnchad (d. 1113)	Domnall (d. 1115); K of the Isles	Amlaíb (d. 1096)	Bé Binn	Donnchad (d. 1115); K of Leinster

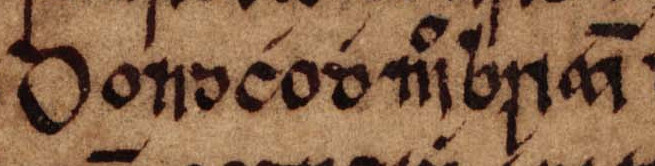
The name of Donnchad mac Briain as it appears on folio 18r of Oxford Bodleian Library Rawlinson B 488: "Dondchod mac Briain".

Following his meeting with Knútr, Echmarcach appears to have allied himself with the Uí Briain, the descendants of Brian Bóruma mac Cennétig, High King of Ireland. In 1032, the eleventh- to fourteenth-century Annals of Inisfallen states that Donnchad mac Briain, King of Munster married the daughter of a certain Ragnall, adding: "hence the saying: 'the spring of Ragnall's daughter'". This woman is elsewhere identified as Cacht ingen Ragnaill. Like Echmarcach himself, Cacht's patronym could be evidence that she was a near relation of the Ragnalls who ruled Waterford, or else a descendant of Ragnall mac Gofraid. She could have therefore been a sister or niece of Echmarcach himself.

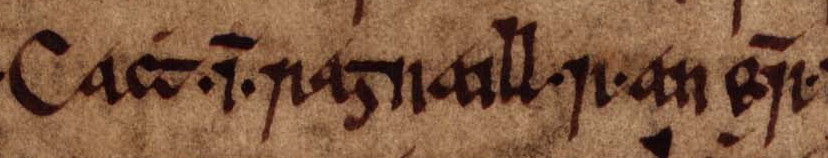
The name and title of Cacht ingen Ragnaill as they appear on folio 18r of Oxford Bodleian Library Rawlinson B 488: ("Cacht ingen Ragnaill, rígan Erenn"). This source styles Cacht "Queen of Ireland", which could reveal the affection that her husband, Donnchad, felt for her. (Note: Although the Irish Annals fail to accord her husband with a comparable title, he is called "King of Ireland" on the cumdach of the Stowe Missal.)

At about the time of his union with Cacht, Donnchad aspired to become High King of Ireland. With powerful maritime forces at his command, Echmarcach would have certainly been regarded as an important potential ally. Clear evidence of an alliance between Echmarcach and the Uí Briain exists in the record of a marriage between Echmarcach's daughter, Mór, and Toirdelbach Ua Briain's son, Tadc, preserved by the twelfth-century Banshenchas, a text which records the marriage of Echmarcach's daughter, Mór, to Tadc, son of Toirdelbach Ua Briain. Annalistic evidence of such an alliance is found well into the late eleventh century. In fact, kinship between Echmarcach's descendants and the Uí Briain even led to the accession of one of Echmarcach's maternal grandsons, Domnall mac Taidc, to the kingship of the Isles at about the turn of the twelfth century. (Note: An alliance with Echmarcach's family could account for the swiftness in which the Uí Briain attempted to regain control of Dublin and Mann immediately following the death of Diarmait mac Maíl na mBó in 1072. Certainly, Toirdelbach seized Dublin within the year, and apparently handed it over to Gofraid mac Amlaíb meic Ragnaill, a man who may well have been Echmarcach's nephew. The following year, the Annals of Loch Cé and the Annals of Ulster reveal that Mann was invaded by two members of the Uí Briain and a certain Sitriuc mac Amlaíb, a man who could have been Gofraid mac Amlaíb meic Ragnaill's brother. In 1087, the Annals of Ulster records an invasion of Mann by the son of the King of Ulaid and at least two descendants of a certain Ragnall. The latter men could have been descendants of Echmarcach's father: perhaps sons of Echmarcach, Gofraid mac Amlaíb meic Ragnaill, or the latter's apparent father (a man named Amlaíb). In 1096, the Annals of the Four Masters indicate that Echmarcach's maternal-grandson, Amlaíb mac Taidc, was slain on Mann. Finally, the thirteenth- to fourteenth-century Chronicle of Mann and the Annals of Inisfallen reveal that Amlaíb mac Taidc's brother, the aforesaid Domnall, ruled as King of the Isles before and after the turn of the twelfth century. In fact, the account of Domnall's appointment in the Isles, preserved by the Chronicle of Mann, seems to indicate that, by the end of the eleventh century, he was the senior male representative of Echmarcach's family. There may be much later evidence of Echmarcach's family in the region, as the chronicle records an invasion of Mann by a certain Ragnall mac Echmarcacha in the 1170s or 1180s. The name of this man, combined with the chronicle's vague identification of him as "apparently a man of royal descent", could indicate that he was a distant relative. From the standpoint of the Uí Briain, the union between Mór and Tadc seems to have been orchestrated in the context of extending Uí Briain authority into the Isles.)

If Echmarcach was a son of Ragnall mac Gofraid, this alliance with the Uí Briain would have been a continuation of amiable relations between the two families. For example, the father of Ragnall mac Gofraid appears to have combined forces with Brian Bóruma in 984, and Ragnall mac Gofraid himself is recorded to have died in Munster, the heartland of the Uí Briain. If, on the other hand, Echmarcach and Cacht were descended from the Waterford dynasty, an alliance between the Uí Briain and this family may have been undertaken in the context of a struggle between the Uí Briain and the Uí Cheinnselaig. The contemporary leader of the latter kindred was Donnchad's principal opponent, Diarmait mac Maíl na mBó, King of Leinster. Whilst the Uí Briain certainly allied themselves to Cacht and Echmarcach, Diarmait appears to have backed the descendants of Amlaíb Cuarán, a man whose family appears to have opposed Echmarcach at a latter date.

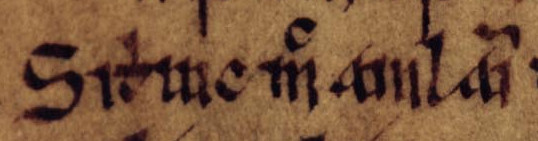
The name of Sitriuc mac Amlaíb as it appears on folio 16v of Oxford Bodleian Library Rawlinson B 488: "Sitriuic mac Amlaim".

In 1036, Echmarcach replaced Amlaíb Cuarán's son, Sitriuc mac Amlaíb, as King of Dublin. The Annals of Tigernach specifies that Sitriuc fled overseas as Echmarcach took control. An alliance with Donnchad could explain Echmarcach's success in seizing the kingship from Sitriuc. Although Donnchad and Sitriuc were maternal half-brothers—as both descended from Gormlaith ingen Murchada—Donnchad's hostility towards Sitriuc is demonstrated by the record of a successful attack he led upon the Dubliners in 1026.

Another factor behind Echmarcach's actions against Sitriuc could concern Knútr. Echmarcach's seizure of Dublin occurred only a year after the latter's death in 1035. There appears to be numismatic evidence, annalistic evidence, and charter evidence indicating that Knútr and Sitriuc had cooperated together in terms of trade and military operations in Wales. In contrast to this apparent congeniality, the relationship between Knútr and Echmarcach appears to have been less amiable. In fact, it is possible that Echmarcach's meeting with Knútr may have bound him from taking action against Sitriuc, and that the confusion caused by Knútr's demise may have enabled Echmarcach to exploit the situation by seizing control of the Irish Sea region.

According to a poetic verse composed by the contemporary Icelandic skald Óttarr svarti, Knútr's subjects included Danes, Englishmen, Irishmen, and Islesmen. (Note: The fact that Óttarr failed to name Norwegians suggests that he composed his poem before Knútr's conquest of Norway in 1028.) These Islanders could refer to either the folk of the Isles or Orkney, whilst the Irish seems to refer to the Dubliners. Although the poet's implication that Knútr possessed authority over Sitriuc is not corroborated by any other source, and may therefore be poetic hyperbole, the fact that Sitriuc had been able to undertake a pilgrimage and return home to an intact kingdom in 1028 may demonstrate the extent of influence that Knútr held over the Irish Sea region. This authority, and Sitriuc's apparent close connections with Knútr, could account for the security Sitriuc enjoyed during Knútr's reign.

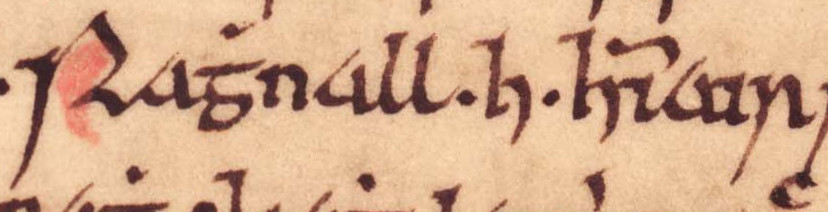
The name of Ragnall ua Ímair, a member of the Waterford dynasty slain in 1035, as it appears on folio 39r of Oxford Bodleian Library Rawlinson B 489.

If Echmarcach was a member of the Waterford dynasty, his action against Sitriuc may have been undertaken in the context of continuous dynastic strife between Dublin and Waterford in the tenth- and eleventh centuries. This could mean that Echmarcach's expulsion of Sitriuc was a direct act of vengeance for the latter's slaying of Ragnall ua Ímair (then King of Waterford) the year before.

Little is known of Echmarcach's short reign in Dublin other than an attack on Skryne and Duleek, recorded by the seventeenth-century Annals of the Four Masters in 1037. This strike could have been undertaken in the context of the Dubliner's gradual loss of power in Brega, and an attempt to regain authority of Skryne. Although there is no direct evidence that Echmarcach controlled Mann at this point in his career, Sitriuc does not appear to have taken refuge on the island after his expulsion from Dublin. This seems to suggest that the island was outside Sitriuc's possession, and may indicate that Mann had fallen into the hands of Echmarcach sometime before. In fact, it is possible that Echmarcach may have used the island to launch his takeover of Dublin. (Note: It is unknown how Mann came into Echmarcach's possession. If Echmarcach was a member of the Waterford dynasty, one possibility is that Sitriuc's maritime strength may have declined due to the back-and-forth warring with Ulaid, and that the erosion of Sitriuc's forces may have enabled Echmarcach and his family to seize control of Mann. Certainly, Niall mac Eochada, King of Ulaid is recorded to have defeated a Dublin fleet in 1022, whilst an attack on Fine Gall by the forces of Ulaid is recorded in 1026. Ulaid is not otherwise known to have been a maritime power, a fact which could suggest that this kingdom had been assisted in its naval victory by Echmarcach and his family.)

== Strife in the Isles, Ireland, and Wales ==
Silver coin hoards and mixed hoards found in regions of Scandinavian Scotland and Mann. The third highest peak, during the 1030s–1050s, may illustrate intense conflict in the Irish Sea region.

The evidence of Þórfinnr's power in the Isles could suggest that he possessed an active interest in the ongoing struggle over the Dublin kingship. Þórfinnr's predatory operations in the Irish Sea region may have contributed to Echmarcach's loss of Dublin in 1038. Just as Echmarcach may have seized upon Knútr's demise to expand, it is possible that the vacuum caused by Knútr's death allowed Þórfinnr to prey upon the Irish Sea region. Certainly, the corresponding annal-entry of the Annals of Tigernach—stating that Ímar mac Arailt succeeded Echmarcach as King of Dublin that year—appears to indicate that Echmarcach had been forced from the kingship. Ímar appears have been a descendant (possibly a grandson) of Amlaíb Cuarán, and thus a close relative of the latter's son, Sitriuc, whom Echmarcach drove from the kingship only two years before. It is possible that Ímar received some form of support from Knútr's son and successor in England, Haraldr Knútsson, King of England. The latter was certainly in power when Ímar replaced Echmarcach, and an association between Ímar and Haraldr Knútsson could explain why the Annals of Ulster reports the latter's death two years later. The fact that Ímar proceeded to campaign in the North Channel could indicate that Echmarcach had held power in this region before his acquisition of Mann and Dublin. Whatever the case, Ímar's reign lasted only eight years. In 1046, the Annals of the Four Masters records that he was expelled by Echmarcach, who was then elected king by the Dubliners. The Annals of Tigernach, on the other-hand, simply state that Echmarcach succeeded Ímar. (Note: The latter source erroneously identifies Ímar by his father's name, Aralt.)

Echmarcach may well have controlled Mann throughout his second reign in Dublin. Silver hoards uncovered on Mann, dated by their coins to the years 1030s–1050s, may well be the by-product of the intense conflict over control of the island. There is evidence indicating that, at some point in the early eleventh century—perhaps in the 1020s–1030s—a mint may have developed and functioned on Mann. Coins that appear to have been minted on the island roughly coincide with Echmarcach's rule. These coins are very similar to those produced in Dublin, and may be evidence that Echmarcach attempted to harmonise the coinage utilised within his realm. The production of coins on Mann appears to be evidence of a sophisticated economy in the Isles. In fact, the wealth and sophistication of commerce in Echmarcach's realm could in part explain why the constant struggle for control of Dublin and the Isles was so bitter, and could account for Þórfinnr's apparent presence in the region.

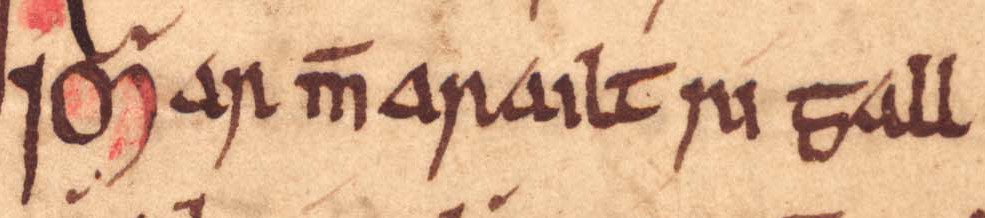
The name and title of Echmarcach's opponent Ímar mac Arailt as they appear on folio 41r of Oxford Bodleian Library Rawlinson B 489.

During his second reign, Echmarcach may have been involved in military activities in Wales with Gruffudd ap Rhydderch. For instance in the year 1049, English and Welsh sources record that Norse-Gaelic forces were utilised by Gruffudd ap Rhydderch against his Welsh rivals and English neighbours. Specifically, the Anglo-Saxon Chronicle, the thirteenth- and fourteenth-century Brut y Tywysogyon, and the twelfth-century Chronicon ex chronicis record that a Norse-Gaelic fleet sailed up the River Usk, and ravaged the surrounding region. These sources further reveal that Gruffudd ap Rhydderch and his Norse-Gaelic allies later surprised and routed the English forces of Ealdred, Bishop of Worcester.

Since Echmarcach's extensive imperium appears to have spanned the Irish Sea region, it is possible that he was regarded as a threat by Siward, Earl of Northumbria. There is reason to suspect that, by the mid-eleventh century, this Anglo-Danish magnate extended his authority into what had previously been the Kingdom of Strathclyde. Echmarcach's apparent descent from the Uí Ímair—a dynasty that once reigned over York as kings—combined with Echmarcach's accumulation of power after Knútr's demise, could well have been a cause of concern to the York-based earl. Such unease could partly account for Siward's extension of power into the Solway region, a sphere of insecure territory which may have been regarded as vulnerable by Echmarcach.

== Downfall in Dublin and Mann ==
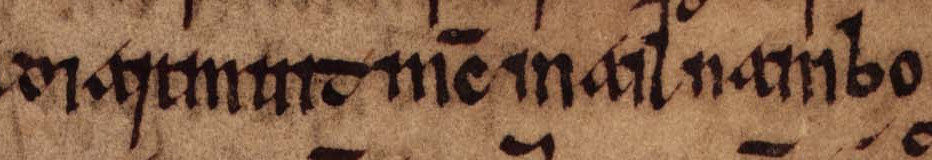
The name of Diarmait mac Maíl na mBó as it appears on folio 18r of Oxford Bodleian Library Rawlinson B 488: "Diarmuit mac Mail na m-Bo".

In 1052, Diarmait drove Echmarcach from Dublin. The event is documented by the Annals of the Four Masters, the Annals of Tigernach, the Annals of Ulster, and Chronicon Scotorum. These annalistic accounts indicate that, although Diarmait's conquest evidently began with a mere raid upon Fine Gall, this action further escalated into the seizure of Dublin itself. Following several skirmishes fought around the town's central fortress, the aforesaid accounts report that Echmarcach fled overseas, whereupon Diarmait assumed the kingship. With Diarmait's conquest, Norse-Gaelic Dublin ceased to be an independent power in Ireland; and when Diarmait and his son, Murchad, died about twenty years later, Irish rule had been exercised over Fine Gall and Dublin in a degree unheard of before. In consequence of Echmarcach's expulsion, Dublin effectively became the provincial capital of Leinster, with the town's remarkable wealth and military power at Diarmait's disposal.

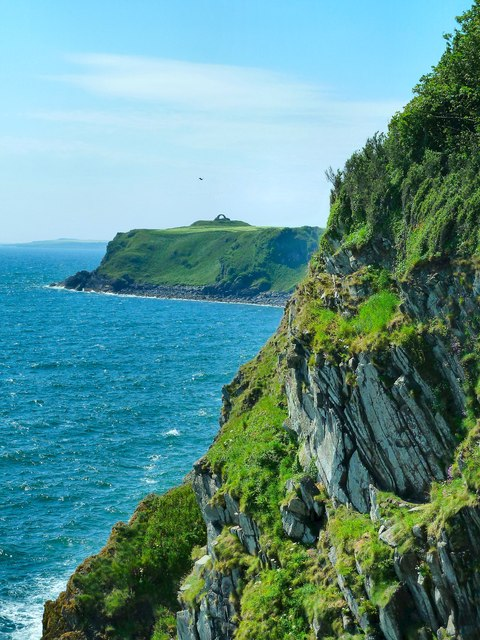
Ruinous Cruggleton Castle from a distance. The fortress was likely a power centre of later Lords of Galloway, and could have been a seat of Echmarcach himself.

The fact that in 1054, Ímar mac Arailt is styled on his death "rí Gall", a title meaning "king of the foreigners", could indicate that Diarmait reinserted him as King of Dublin after Echmarcach's expulsion. Murchad appears to have been granted the kingship by 1059, as evidenced by the title tigherna Gall, meaning "lord of the foreigners", accorded to him that year. (Note: Although this source styles Murchad merely as a "lord", the original from which this annal draws upon likely read "king". The Annals of the Four Masters is otherwise known to relegate royal titles to lordly ones.) Murchad was evidently an energetic figure, and in 1061 he launched a successful seaborne invasion of Mann. The Annals of the Four Masters, and the Annals of Tigernach further reveal that Murchad extracted a tax from Mann, and that the son of a certain Ragnall (literally "mac Raghnaill" and "mac Ragnaill") was driven from the island. The gathering of cáin or tribute was a mediaeval right of kingship in Ireland. In fact, Murchad's collection of such tribute from the Manx could be evidence that, as the King of Dublin, Murchad regarded himself as the rightful overlord of Mann. If the vanquished son of Ragnall was Echmarcach himself, as seems most likely, (Note: Another candidate for the defeated "son of Ragnall" is Echmarcach's apparent brother, Amlaíb, the apparent father of Gofraid mac Amlaíb meic Ragnaill.) the record of Murchad's actions against him would appear to indicate that Echmarcach had seated himself on the island after his expulsion from Dublin. Another possibility is that Echmarcach had only been reestablished himself as king in the Isles after Ímar mac Arailt's death in 1054.

== Magnús Haraldsson and Ælfgar Leofricson ==
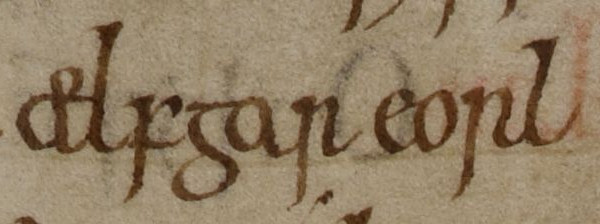
The name of Ælfgar Leofricson as it appears on folio 161v of British Library Cotton Tiberius B I (the "C" version of the Anglo-Saxon Chronicle): "Ælfgar eorl".

In 1055, after being outlawed for treason in the course of a comital power-struggle, English nobleman Ælfgar Leofricson fled from England to Ireland. Ælfgar evidently received considerable military aid from the Irish to form a fleet of eighteen ships, and together with Gruffudd ap Llywelyn, King of Gwynedd and Deheubarth invaded Herefordshire.

Although this campaign ultimately secured Ælfgar's reinstatement, Ælfgar (then Earl of Mercia) was again exiled from England in 1058, and proceeded to ally himself with Gruffudd ap Llywelyn and a Norse fleet. Notwithstanding the fact that Scandinavian sources fail to report this operation, the Annals of Tigernach reveals that the leader of the fleet was Magnús, son of Haraldr Sigurðarson, King of Norway, and further reports that Magnús' forces were composed of Orcadians, Islesmen, and Dubliners.

Exactly who Ælfgar received aid from in the Irish Sea region is uncertain. It is conceivable that, after his flight from England in 1055, Ælfgar was outfitted in Dublin, then ruled by Murchad (with Diarmait as overlord). Likewise, since Diarmait's forces had previously driven Echmarcach from Dublin in 1052, and apparently from Mann in 1061, the joint campaign of Ælfgar and Magnús in 1058—which utilised Islesmen and Dubliners—could well have involved Diarmait's cooperation as well. That being said, there are several reasons to doubt a part played by Diarmait in Ælfgar's military undertakings. For instance, Diarmait seems to have lent assistance to Ælfgar's enemies—the Godwinsons—in the 1050s and 1060s. Diarmait also appears to have previously backed Cynan ab Iago, a man who was a bitter rival and seemingly the eventual slayer of Ælfgar's ally and son-in-law, Gruffudd ap Llywelyn.

The name of Magnús Haraldsson as it appears on folio 22r of AM 47 fol (Eirspennill): "Magnus son Haʀalldz konvngs".

Ælfgar's Irish confederate of 1055 is not identified in any source, and it is not clear that Diarmait had a part to play in the aforesaid events of that year. In fact, it is possible that Ælfgar received aid not from Diarmait, but from Donnchad—Diarmait's enemy and Echmarcach's associate—a man who then controlled the Norse-Gaelic enclaves of Limerick and possibly Waterford. Furthermore, although Diarmait appears to have gained overlordship of Mann by 1061, Echmarcach presumably enjoyed overlordship of at least part of the Hebrides in 1058. Since Magnús utilised Islesmen during his English campaign of that year, it is conceivable that Echmarcach may have played a prominent part in these operations. If Echmarcach was indeed involved in the campaign, the enmity between him and Diarmait could indicate that these two were unlikely to have cooperated as allies.

The prime motivation behind Magnús' cooperation with Ælfgar is uncertain. One possibility is that he was attempting to establish Norwegian authority in the west as a means to prepare an invasion of England. In so doing, Magnús may have backed the cause of a local faction that opposed Echmarcach. Certainly, the thirteenth- to fourteenth-century Chronicle of Mann records that Ímar's apparent son, Gofraid Crobán—a future ruler of Dublin and the Isles—backed the Norwegian invasion of England led by Magnús' father in 1066.

== Pilgrimage and death in Rome ==
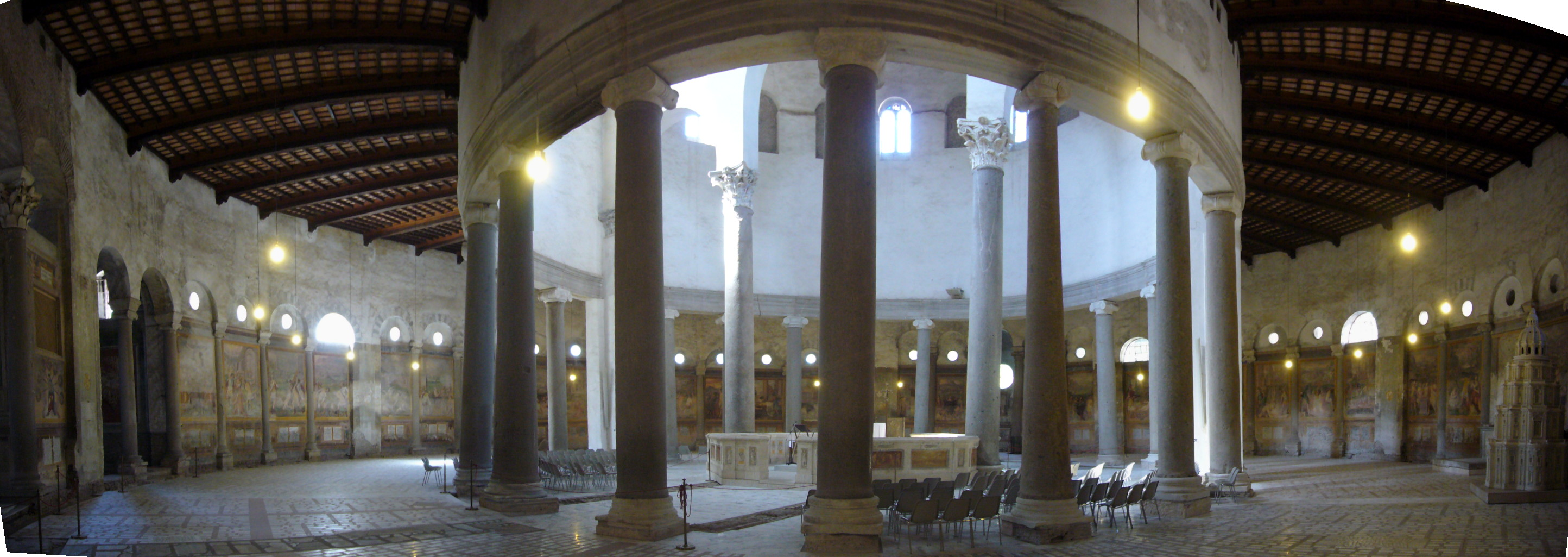
Interior of Santo Stefano Rotondo, an ancient Italian basilica in which Echmarcach and Donnchad may have spent their final days.

In 1064, Echmarcach seems to have been accompanied by Donnchad upon a pilgrimage to Rome. (Note: The year before, in 1063, Donnchad was driven from Munster by Toirdelbach and Diarmait.) By this time the two may well have been of an advanced age, and both appear to have died in the city soon afterwards. Surviving sources give conflicting dates for Echmarcach's passing, and it is uncertain whether he died in 1064 or 1065. The Annals of Inisfallen, the Annals of Loch Cé, and the Annals of Ulster indicate that he died in 1064. The eleventh-century Chronicon of Marianus Scotus records that Echmarcach died in 1065, in a statement which implies that Echmarcach and Donnchad travelled to Rome together. Donnchad himself seems to have died in 1064, as a multitude of sources report his pilgrimage to Rome and demise that year. (Note: Specifically, the seventeenth-century Annals of Clonmacnoise, the Annals of Loch Cé, the Annals of the Four Masters, the Annals of Tigernach, the Annals of Ulster, and Chronicon Scotorum. The Annals of Inisfallen and the thirteenth-century Cottonian Annals record his trek to Rome, but not his death specifically. Another source documenting the pilgrimage of Echmarcach and Donnchad is the fifteenth-century Annla Gearra as Proibhinse Ard Macha.) Several of these sources appear to indicate that Donnchad died at Santo Stefano Rotondo, an ancient basilica on the Caelian Hill. (Note: Specifically, the Annals of Clonmacnoise, the Annals of the Four Masters, the Annals of Tigernach, and Chronicon Scotorum. Within the building, a plaque of unknown provenance (although seemingly centuries old) refers to Donnchad.) This building was an important place of pilgrimage to contemporaries, and apparently housed both Echmarcach and Donnchad before they died. Pilgrimages such as those of Echmarcach and Donnchad were not unheard of amongst high-ranking Gaelic and Norse-Gaelic contemporaries, and several such high-status figures are known to have perished undertaking pilgrimages of their own to Rome. If Echmarcach's father was indeed Ragnall mac Gofraid, and if Echmarcach had been born only a few years before his father's death, Echmarcach would have thus been about sixty-five when he himself was laid to rest. (Note: The pilgrimage undertaken by Echmarcach and Donnchad may have been partly influenced by that undertaken by Knútr.)

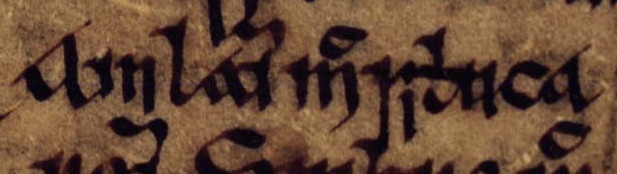
The name of Amlaíb mac Sitriuc as it appears on folio 16v of Oxford Bodleian Library Rawlinson B 488: "Amlaim mac Sitriuca". Amlaíb was the son of Echmarcach's Dublin opponent, Sitriuc, and may have been a neighbouring ruler in Galloway.

Marianus Scotus' account of Echmarcach accords him the Latin title "rex Innarenn". On one hand, this may be a garbled form of the Latin "rex insularum", meaning "King of the Isles". If so, the titles "ri Gall" and "rí Gall" accorded to him by the Annals of Ulster and the Annals of Inisfallen in 1064 could indicate that he was still regarded as ruler of Mann. On the other hand, "rex Innarenn" could instead mean "King of the Rhinns", in reference to the Rhinns of Galloway. During Echmarcach's floruit, the Rhinns appear to have also included what is today known as the Machars. The entire region would have thus stretched from the North Channel to Wigtown Bay, and would have likely encompassed an area similar to the modern boundaries of Wigtownshire. Earlier in the century, the entire region may have formed part of Sitriuc's realm, and various Irish and Welsh sources indicate that it may have been held by one of the latter's two sons named Amlaíb. (Note: The sixteenth-century Irish Annals of Loch Cé records that men from the Rhinns and Mann formed part of the Dublin-led forces at the Battle of Clontarf, which could suggest that a son of Sitriuc controlled these regions before 1013. Another source, the thirteenth-century Welsh Historia Gruffud vab Kenan, states that a son of Sitriuc named Amlaíb was the maternal grandfather of Gruffudd ap Cynan, King of Gwynedd. If this source is to be believed, Amlaíb held royal power in the Rhinns and Galloway (amongst other places). Of Sitriuc's two sons named Amlaíb: one is known to have died in 1013, whilst the other died in 1034. Either man could have been the Amlaíb referred to by the aforesaid source. In fact, it is not certain if either ruled as a king. Nevertheless, if Historia Gruffud vab Kenan refers to the latter Amlaíb, this source could be evidence that this man was a contemporary of Echmarcach and Suibne, and could indicate that this Amlaíb held power in Galloway and the Isles at some point between 1028 (the year his father set out upon a pilgrimage) and 1034 (the year of his death). A cognate text that similarly connects the possession of the Rhinns and Galloway to a son of Sitriuc is the twelfth-century Vita Griffini filii Conani.)

If Echmarcach was indeed the son of Ragnall mac Gofraid, and succeeded his father sometime in the 1030s, Echmarcach may well have first gained control of the Rhinns when he apparently began his domination of the Irish Sea region in 1036 (the year he first seized Dublin). Even if such a chronology is correct it does not necessarily mean that Echmarcach owed his rule in the Rhinns to ancestral connections in the Isles—it could have instead derived from his new-found position in Dublin. Although in practice, the collection of cáin could be undertaken without the displacement of an underking, if "rex Innarenn" indeed refers to the Rhinns it could reveal that, after having been defeated by Murchad on Mann, the defeated Echmarcach fled to this mainland region. Furthermore, if Echmarcach was a native of what is today the south-west of Scotland, the title could be evidence that, on the collapse of Echmarcach's once expansive kingdom, Echmarcach proceeded to entrench himself in the protection of his native home.

== Margaðr and Guthormr Gunnhildarson ==
Margaðr's name as it appears on folio 19v of AM 47 fol: "Margaðr". This name has erroneously been regarded as an Old Norse form of Echmarcach.

Echmarcach has sometimes been identified as a certain Margaðr who appears in various mediaeval sources documenting the contemporary Irish Sea adventures of Margaðr and Guthormr Gunnhildarson. One such source is Haralds saga Sigurðarsonar, within Heimskringla. According to this source, Margaðr was King of Dublin, and a close friend of Guthormr, an accomplished man who was a nephew of the Norwegian kings Óláfr and Haraldr Sigurðarson. (Note: Óláfr was slain in 1030, and proclaimed a saint by his attendant bishop, Grímkell, the following year. According to Óláfs saga helga in Heimskringla, Guthormr's mother, Gunnhildr, was the daughter of Ásta Guðbrandsdóttir, who in turn was the mother of Óláfr and Haraldr Sigurðarson. Other sources concerning the adventures of Margaðr and Guthormr include the thirteenth-century Legendary Saga of St Óláfr, the thirteenth-century Old Norwegian Homily Book, and the twelfth-century Passio et miracula beati Olavi. The latter text exists in two versions, and shorter of these two is called Acta sancti Olavi regis et martyris.) Late one summer, the saga relates that Margaðr and Guthormr took part in a particularly successful raid in Wales. As their loot of silver was being assessed, Margaðr demanded Guthormr's share, forcing the latter to fight for his portion of the plunder. Although outnumbered sixteen ships to five, the saga relates that, through the miraculous intervention of God and Guthormr's saintly uncle (Óláfr), Guthormr was able to defeat and slay Margaðr and all his followers in the ensuing battle.

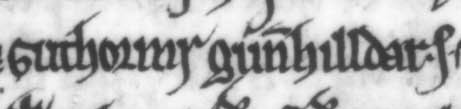
Guthormr's name as it appears on folio 18r of AM 47 fol: "Guthormr Gunnhilldarson".

The fateful encounter between Margaðr and Guthormr is sometimes dated to 1052 on the presumption that Margaðr is identical to Echmarcach, and that the event must have taken place at the conclusion of Echmarcach's second reign in Dublin. In fact, the Old Norse personal name Margaðr is a form of the Gaelic personal name Murchad, (Note: An Old Norse form of the personal name Echmarcach would likely be similar to "Iehmarc", recorded in the Old English Anglo-Saxon Chronicle.) and the aforesaid accounts of Margaðr likely refer to Echmarcach's nemesis Murchad, rather than Echmarcach himself. Although the saga claims that a thankful Guthormr donated a portion of his looted silver to the shrine of his saintly uncle at Niðaróss, it is unlikely that any church would have accepted property known to have been looted from Christians. Instead, it is possible that Guthormr's hoard of silver was actually the tax that Murchad had collected from Mann in 1061 during the expulsion of Echmarcach. Such a date corresponds to the implied date of about 1061 given by Heimskringla. (Note: The payment of silver as a tax in the Irish Sea region is noted in several historical sources. For example, the eleventh- or twelfth-century Cogad Gáedel re Gallaib states that silver was paid for a nose tax. Saga-tradition preserved by the thirteenth-century Njáls saga, and the thirteenth-century Eyrbyggja saga, reveals that Sigurðr Hlǫðvisson, Earl of Orkney extracted a tax of silver from the Isles.)

== Citations ==
Echmarcach mac Ragnaill Uí Ímair Died: 1064/1065
Regnal titles
Preceded by Sitriuc mac Amlaíb	King of Dublin; 1036–1038	Succeeded by Ímar mac Arailt
Preceded by Ímar mac Arailt	King of Dublin; 1046–1052	Succeeded by Diarmait mac Maíl na mBó
