= Suibne of Skellig =

Saint Suibne of Skellig
- Born: unknown
- Died: Skellig Michael
- Feast: 28 April

Saint Suibne, also recorded in the Martyrology of Tallaght as "Suibni in Scelig", was an Irish monk associated with the island of Skellig Michael off County Kerry in Ireland.

One of a number of saints named Suibne, his name is mentioned in the Martyrology of Donegal under 28 April. Some sources suggest that he "may well have been a prominent cleric at Skellig Michael".
