= Guttorm Gunnhildsson =

Guttorm Gunnhildsson was a Norwegian Viking who was active in the Irish Sea region in the eleventh century. He appears as a historical personage in Heimskringla, where it is mentioned that Guttorm, Finn Arnesson and jarl Håkon Ivarsson organized expeditions towards the west. Guttorm became the friend of the king of Dublin Echmarcach mac Ragnaill with whom he took part in some Viking raids towards the south. During the attacks in Wales he quarreled with Echmarcach over the plunder and began hostilities against his former ally Echmarcach by the distribution of the booty among his own men and then commenced a sea battle in Menai Strait consisting of a force of sixteen boats of Echmarcach against five of Guttorm. Guttorm won the battle after praying to Saint Olaf and promising to him a tenth part of the booty; Echmarcach died during the combat in 1052.

== Bibliography ==
- Sturluson, Snorri. Heimskringla: History of the Kings of Norway, trans. Lee M. Hollander. Reprinted University of Texas Press, Austin, 1992. ISBN 0-292-73061-6
