= Eachmarcach Ó Catháin =

Eachmarcach Ó Catháin (a.k.a. Echlin O'Cahan or Ackland Kane), Irish harper and composer, 1720–1790).

== Life ==
Ó Catháin was born at Drogheda in 1720, and was taught to play the harp by Cornelius Lyons, harper to the Earl of Antrim.

He travelled to Rome and played before Prince Charles Edward Stuart there. He then visited France, and went on to Madrid, where he played to the Irish gentlemen living at that court, who praised him to the king. But his uproarious habits did not suit Spanish decorum, and he had to walk to Bilbao with his harp on his back.

After returning to Ireland he went to Scotland, and there made many journeys from house to house. Sir Alexander MacDonald in Skye gave him a silver harp-key, long in the family, and originally left by his kinsman and fellow harper, Ruaidri Dáll Ó Catháin (died 1653).

The gift is mentioned by Boswell in the `Tour to the Hebrides.' O'Kane played all the old native airs, as well as the treble and bass parts of Corelli's correnti in concert with other music.

Captain Francis O'Neill remarked of him:

"His behavior was not at all times so exemplary, for Mr. Gunn relates that the Highland gentry occasionally found it necessary to repress his turbulence by clipping his nails; thereby “putting him out of business” for a time."

"His execution and proficiency were a credit to his teacher, Cornelius Lyons, harper to the Earl of Antrim. Manini often spoke of him at Cambridge with rapture, as being able though blind, to play with accuracy and great effect the fine treble and bass parts of many of Corelli’s concerts, in concert with other music. Had he been but moderately correct in his conduct he might with certainty have raised the character of the wandering minstrel higher than it had stood for a century before."
