= Moel-y-don =

Coordinates: 53.187°N 4.218°W

- Location within Anglesey
- OS grid reference: SH 519 678
  - Cardiff: 126 mi (203 km)
  - London: 208.1 mi (334.9 km)
- Community: Llanddaniel Fab
- Principal area: Anglesey
- Country: Wales
- Sovereign state: United Kingdom
- Post town: Llanfair Pwllgwyngyll
- Police: North Wales
- Fire: North Wales
- Ambulance: Welsh
- UK Parliament: Ynys Môn
- Senedd Cymru – Welsh Parliament: Ynys Môn

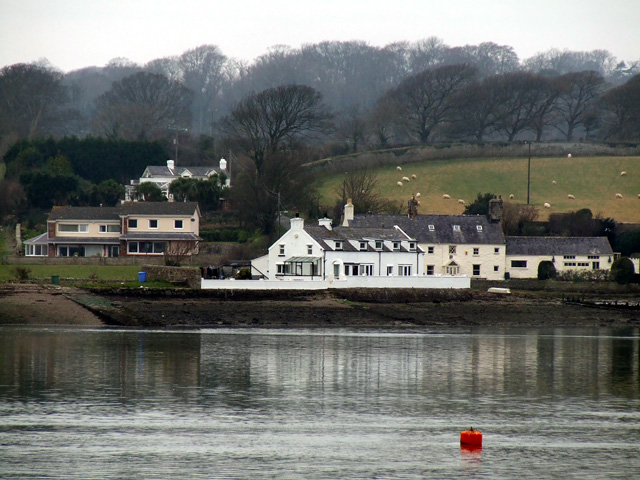
Cottages at Moel y Don

Moel-y-don is a small hamlet in the community of Llanddaniel Fab, Anglesey, Wales, which is 126 miles (202.7 km) from Cardiff and 208.1 miles (334.9 km) from London. It is located on the Menai Strait, opposite Y Felinheli.

== See also ==
- List of localities in Wales by population
