= Suibhne mac Mailchunai =

Irish scribe at the abbey of Clonmacnoise

Suibhne mac Mailchunai (died 891 or 892) was a mediæval Irish scribe at the abbey of Clonmacnoise, described as the "most excellent scribe" by the Annals of Ulster and the "wisest of the Scots" by the Annales Cambriæ. He is believed to be the Suifneh referred to by Florence of Worcester as the most learned doctor of the Scots. His work and the titles of his work are lost.
