= Kingdom of the Rhinns =

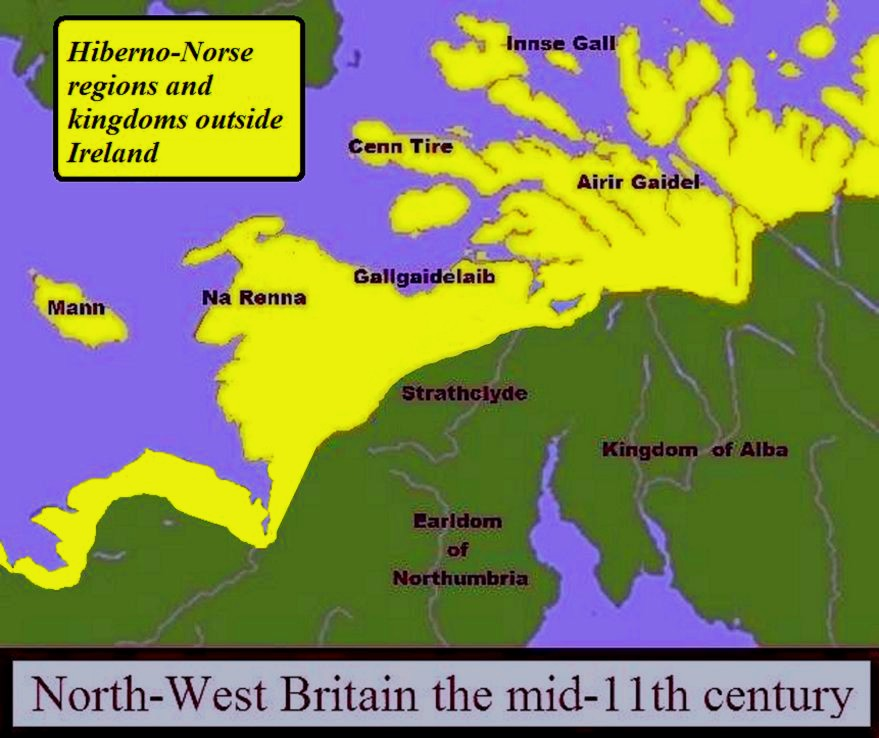
Na Renna in the 11th century Kingdom of the Isles

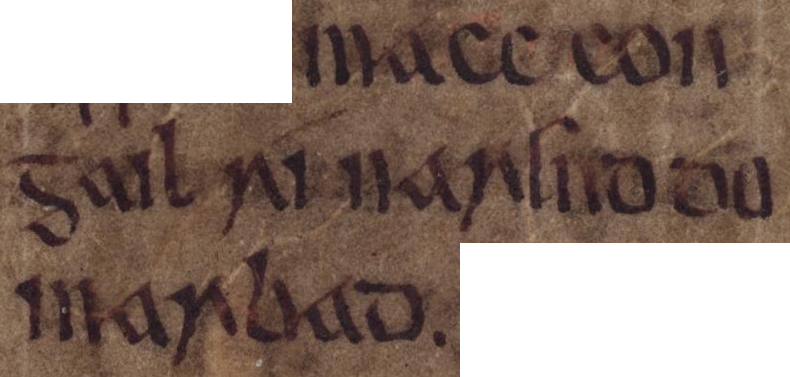
An excerpt from the Annals of Inisfallen. The text refers to an event dated 1094, and reads in Irish Macc Congail, rí na Rend, do marbad, which translates into English as "Congal's son, king of Na Renna, was slain".

Na Renna, or the Kingdom of the Rhinns, was a Norse-Gaelic lordship which appears in 11th century records. The Rhinns (Scottish Gaelic: Na Rannaibh) was a province in Medieval Scotland, and comprised, along with Farines, the later Wigtownshire. The Martyrology of Óengus gives some idea of the kingdom's domain in the 11th century, as Dún Reichet (Dunragit) and Futerna (Whithorn) are said to lie in the kingdom, implying that it embraced the whole of later Wigtownshire.

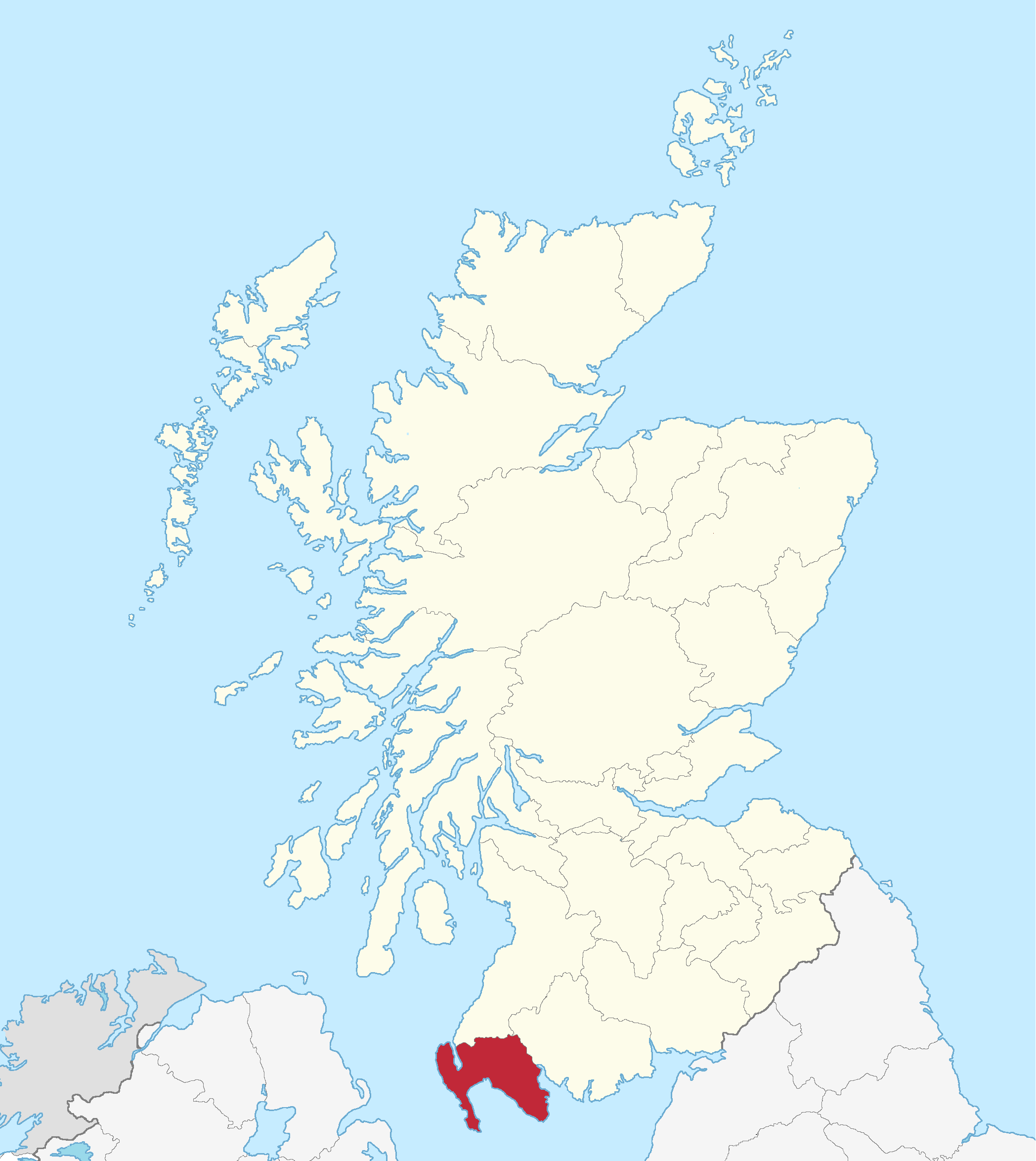
Map of Wigtownshire in which the Kingdom of the Rhinns encompassed.

== List of known rulers ==
Three rulers are explicitly stated in the sources to have ruled this kingdom:

Dates	Name	Styles	Notes
d. 1034	Amlaíb mac Sitriuc (Óláf Sigtryggsson)	This was not Óláf's only kingdom; he was said by the Life of Gruffudd ap Cynan to have ruled "Dublin, Mann, Galloway, the Rhinns, Anglesey and Gwynedd".	Son of Sigtrygg Silkbeard. His daughter Ragnaillt was the mother of Gruffudd ap Cynan.
d. 1065	Echmarcach mac Ragnaill	rex innarenn	Previously king of Dublin and king of Man; on his death, he was merely "King of the Rhinns".
d. 1093	Macc Congail	rí na Rend	Known only by obituary. Possibly a son of Fingal mac Gofraid.

== See also ==
- Diocese of Galloway
- Lord of Galloway
- Mull of Galloway
- Rhins of Galloway
- Stranraer
