= Gofraid mac Fergusa =

Image a

Image b

Forms of Gofraid mac Fergusa's name as they appear on folios 313r (image a) and 320v (image b) of the seventeenth-century Dublin Royal Irish Academy C iii 3 (the Annals of the Four Masters).

Gofraid mac Fergusa is an alleged ninth-century figure attested by the Annals of the Four Masters and various pedigrees concerning the ancestors of Clann Somhairle and Clann Domhnaill. If the pedigrees are to be believed, he was a son of Fergus mac Eirc, and a descendant of Colla Uais. Likewise, the two annal-entries that note Gofraid mac Fergusa claim that he was an Airgíallan ruler, who aided Cináed mac Ailpín in 835, and died sixteen years later as a ruler of the Isles. Gofraid mac Fergusa's place in the aforesaid pedigrees is chronologically impossible. The events associated with him by the annals are not supported by any contemporary or near contemporary source. In fact, the two annal-entries that recount these alleged events are fabricated additions inserted into the chronicle at some point before the mid seventeenth century.

As a genealogical construct, Gofraid mac Fergusa may represent Clann Somhairle's matrilineal descent from Gofraid Crobán. The latter was the eponym of the Crovan dynasty, a family from which Clann Somhairle dynasts derived their claims to the kingship of the Isles. Both kindreds vied for control of the Isles in the twelfth- and thirteenth centuries. Praise poetry pre-dating the first notice of Gofraid mac Fergusa indicates that Clann Somhairle's descent from a man named Gofraid was indeed highly regarded in the thirteenth century. The chronology of the evolution of this Gofraid into Gofraid mac Fergusa is unknown. The latter's constructed descent from Fergus mac Eirc, and fabricated connections with Cináed mac Ailpín, suggest that he was crafted as a means to connect Clann Domhnaill with the earliest history of the Scottish realm.

== Traditional genealogical figure ==
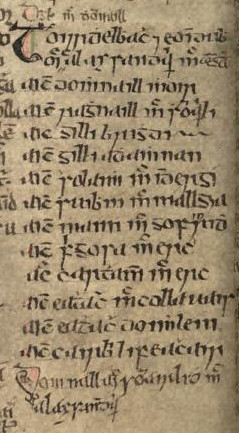
Excerpt from folio 25v of National Library of Ireland G 2 (the Ó Cianáin Miscellany), the earliest source to note Gofraid mac Fergusa. (Note: The excerpt itself is a pedigree pertaining to Toirdhealbhach (died 1366) and Eóin Dubh (died 1349), sons of Alasdair Óg Mac Domhnaill (died 1299?). The text also makes note of the brothers' nephew, Domhnall mac Somhairle. Alasdair Óg was a great-great grandson of Somairle mac Gilla Brigte.)

There are over a dozen sources dating from at least the eighteenth century which outline the traditional ancestry of Somairle mac Gilla Brigte, eponymous ancestor of Clann Somhairle, a mediaeval kindred composed of three main branches: Clann Dubhghaill, Clann Ruaidhrí, and Clann Domhnaill. The earliest source relating to Somairle's ancestry is a pedigree which seems to date to the fourteenth century. Although these sources vary in outlining Somairle's ancestry, many of them refer to a certain Gofraid mac Fergusa (Gofraid, son of Fergus). This man's father, Fergus, is generally presented by these pedigrees as the son of a man named Erc, indicating that this Fergus represents the fifth-century Fergus mac Eirc, a legendary King of Dál Riata. The aforesaid sources generally continue on for several generations reaching to Colla Uais, a legendary Irish king, and traditional ancestor of the Uí Macc Uais lineage of the Airgíalla.

The number of generations between Somairle, Fergus mac Eirc, and Colla Uais are far too few to represent an accurate genealogy, suggesting that the latter two legendary figures were inserted into the lineage. In fact, Somairle's ancestry can only be corroborated as far back as his grandfather. (Note: Somairle's grandfather is consistently identified as a certain Gilla Adamnáin by the pedigrees. This name is corroborated by the Annals of Ulster which names Somairle "Somharlidh Mac Gille Adhamhnain", a patronymic name that evidently refers to his grandfather.) The generations separating this man's father from Gofraid mac Fergusa vary considerably and contain unusual names. Besides Somairle's father and grandfather, the only figures that can be otherwise attested outside of these traditional pedigrees are Colla Uais (and Colla Uais' immediate descendants), Fergus mac Eirc, and Gofraid mac Fergusa.

== Spurious annalistic attestations ==
The name of Somairle mac Gilla Brigte as it appears on folio 447v of Dublin Royal Irish Academy C iii 3. The annal-entry misdates Somairle's death by eighty-one years.

Gofraid mac Fergusa is noted twice by the Annals of the Four Masters. One entry is dated 834. Although the other is dated 851, this entry appears lumped together with entries corresponding to events dated to 853 in other sources. The first entry identifies Gofraid mac Fergusa as a chieftain of the Airgíalla, and states that he went to Alba to support Dál Riata, at the behest of Cináed mac Ailpín (died 858). The second entry styles Gofraid mac Fergusa chief of Innsi Gall whilst reporting his death. There are several reasons to doubt the historical accuracy of these annal-entries. For example, the name Gofraid is a Gaelic form of an Old Norse name, whilst the name Fergus is Gaelic. Although these names could be indicative of mixed ancestry of a bearer, the early ninth century seems to be extremely early for such intermingling amongst the upper classes, especially for an alleged leading member of the Airgíalla, a population group located in north-central Ireland. In fact, the name Gofraid is not attested amongst the Irish or Norse in any uninterpolated Irish source for the ninth century. Certainly, a Gofraid son of Fergus is otherwise unrecorded amongst the Airgíalla, nor is such a figure otherwise attested by any contemporary or near-contemporary source. (Note: Significantly, none of the events presented by the annal-entries are recorded by later traditional clan sources like the Book of Clanranald. This eighteenth-century source details the traditional history of Clann Domhnaill, and credits the family's arrival in Scotland to the actions of Somairle's father.) Furthermore, there is no contemporary or near-contemporary record of Cináed ruling before 842, and it is not until the late thirteenth century when a source—the Chronicle of Huntingdon—erroneously dates the outset of his reign to 834. This particular miscalculation was further propagated in the late fourteenth century by the influential Chronica gentis Scotorum of John Fordun (died 1363). Another issue concerning the entries is the fact that the term Innsi Gall ("the Islands of the Foreigners") is an anachronism during for the period in question, and is otherwise first attested by an historical source in the tenth century.

Yet another spurious entry concerns the aforesaid Somairle. Historically, this king is known to have been killed in 1164. The Annals of the Four Masters misdates his death, reporting it eighty-one years earlier, in 1083. There is evidence indicating that this entry is connected with the two concerning Gofraid mac Fergusa. For instance, all three are single sentences tacked to the end of rather long annal-entries, which could be evidence that they were inserted into the annals together. Furthermore, these three entries appear to be synchronised within eighty-one years of three historical events recorded by other sources. For example, the Annals of Ulster reveals that Gofraid ua Ímair (died 934) died two hundred and thirty years before Somairle's death, whereas the Annals of the Four Masters places Gofraid mac Fergusa's death two hundred and thirty years before its misdated death of Somairle. Additionally, the latter source places Gofraid mac Fergusa's death sixteen years after it reports his arrival in Alba from Ireland, whilst the Annals of Ulster reports Gofraid ua Ímair's death sixteen years after his own arrival in Britain from Ireland.

Synchronisation of three fabricated entries of the Annals of the Four Masters
Annals of the Four Masters	Annals of Ulster
835, Gofraid mac Fergusa to Alba.	918, Gofraid ua Ímair to Britain.
—a span of sixteen years (Note: For the Annals of the Four Masters, this span of years is calculated from the uncorrected date of 851.)—
851 (=853), Gofraid mac Fergusa dies.	934, Gofraid ua Ímair dies.
—a span of two hundred and thirty years (Note: For the Annals of the Four Masters, this span of years is calculated from the corrected date of 853.)—
1083, Somairle mac Gilla Brigte dies.	1164, Somairle mac Gilla Brigte dies.

== Evolution of a genealogical construct ==
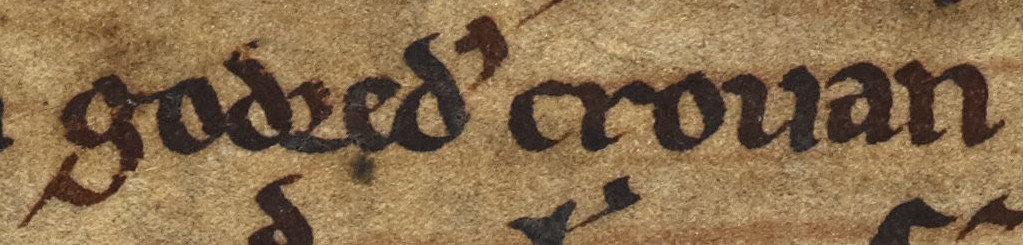
The name of Gofraid Crobán as it appears on folio 50v of British Library Cotton Julius A VII (the Chronicle of Mann): "Godredus Crouan".

Quite how Gofraid mac Fergusa became synchronised with the historical Gofraid ua Ímair is unknown. It could well have taken place between the fourteenth- and the seventeenth centuries. As such, the chronology of Gofraid mac Fergusa's construction may be bounded between the propagation of Cináed's miscalculated accession in the 1380s, and the final compilation of the Annals of the Four Masters in the 1630s. What is more certain is that the twelfth- and thirteenth-century members of Clann Somhairle derived their claim to the kingship of the Isles through their descent from Somairle's wife, Ragnailt, daughter of Amlaíb mac Gofraid (died 1153). Ragnailt and her father were members of the Crovan dynasty, descended from Gofraid Crobán (died 1095), the dynasty's founder. Gofraid Crobán's position at the apex of the Crovan dynasty and Clann Somhairle—two competing kindreds that vied for control of the Isles—could indicate that he is the Gofraid referred to in the earliest evidence of a Clann Somhairle ancestor bearing the name. These references to Gofraid, and the "seed" or "race" of Gofraid, survive in two thirteenth-century compositions of epic praise poetry pre-dating the first attestation of Gofraid mac Fergusa.

The reasons behind Gofraid Crobán's apparent transformation into Gofraid mac Fergusa are uncertain. One possibility is that later unease of a matrilineal descent from the Gofraid of the praise poetry led to the assumption of a patrilineal link with him. Another aspect of the transformation could have concerned a conscious rejection of Gofraid Crobán, which in turn may have led to the adoption of a genealogical link to a similarly-named historical figure like Gofraid ua Ímair. (Note: According to one particular mediaeval pedigree, Gofraid Crobán was—like Gofraid ua Ímair—the grandson of a man named Ímar.) A deliberate disavowal of Gofraid Crobán could have stemmed from a slackening of pride in Clann Domhnaill's supposedly less-than-Gaelic ancestors. Another factor may have concerned the clan's continuous incorporation into the Scottish realm. As such, it is conceivable that Gofraid mac Fergusa was first put forth as an ancestor in the context of Clann Domhnaill's patriotic support of the Bruce cause during the Wars of Scottish Independence. Alternately, the formulation of the doctored annal-entries could date as late as the seventeenth century, and could have been concocted in the context of a legal dispute between Randal MacDonnell (died 1636) and a certain George Crawford. This case concerned claims to Rathlin Island, and featured genealogical evidence designed to bolster this MacDonnell chieftain's defence. In any event, the constructed link with Fergus mac Eirc presented by the pedigrees, and the fabricated connection with Cináed mac Ailpín preserved by the annals, seems to reveal that members of Clann Domhnaill wished to be closely associated with the earliest history of the Scottish realm. As such the kindred could claim a pedigree equal to that of the Scottish kings themselves. (Note: The Clann Domhnall Lordship of the Isles was a successor of the independent Kingdom of the Isles. The earliest reliable evidence of the latter unified realm dates to the tenth century. The annal-entries that note Gofraid mac Fergusa—identifying him as the lord of these islands—seem to reflect later propaganda rather than historical events. Whilst this apparent Gaelic pseudo-history places the origins of the kingdom in the context of association with Cináed mac Ailpín, Scandinavian sagas place its origin in the similarly unhistorical context of association with Haraldr hárfagri in the same century. The traditional claims of Clann Somhairle's descent from Colla Uais may well stem from Clann Domhnaill's settlement in Ireland, and may originate in an attempt to integrate the kindred into local literary tradition and geographical history. For example, an unrelated but similarly-named Irish kindred, the Clann Domhnaill of Clann Ceallaigh, is known to have earlier possessed the kingship of an Airgíallan sub-kingdom, and to have claimed a descent from Colla Uais. This kindred appears in early legal tracts concerning the performance of military service to their Uí Néill overlords. The fact that the Clann Domhnaill of Clann Ceallaigh had lost prominence by the time of Clann Domhnaill's settlement in Ireland, coupled with the fact that Clann Domhnaill was settled in the same vicinity of their Irish namesakes and provided gallowglasses to the Ó Néill kindred, may well explain why Clann Domhnaill was accorded an Airgíallan ancestry like their Irish namesakes.)
