= Roolwer =

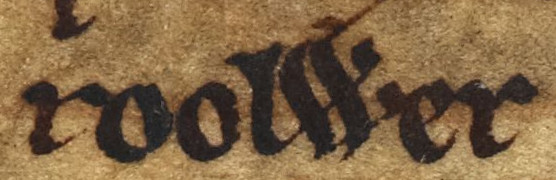
- Roolwer's name as it appears on folio 50v of British Library Cotton Julius A VII (the Chronicle of Mann).
- Church: Roman Catholic Church
- Successor: William

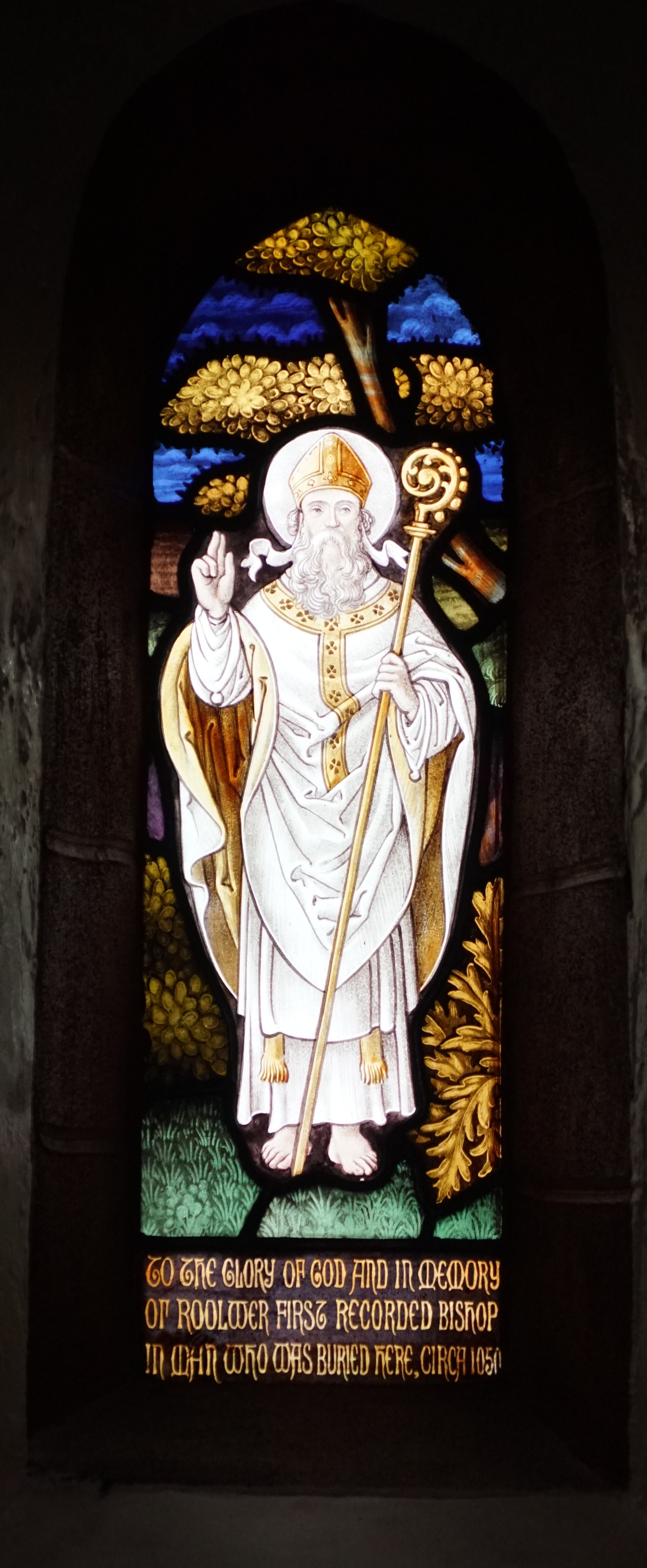
Stained glass in Kirk Maughold depicting bishop Roolwer (circa 1900).

Roolwer, also known as Hrólfr, was an eleventh-century ecclesiast. He is the first named bishop of a jurisdiction which later became the Diocese of the Isles, and appears to have served at his post before, and perhaps during, the reign of Gofraid Crobán, King of Dublin and the Isles. Roolwer's name appears to correspond to the Old Norse Hrólfr, which could mean that he is identical to either of two contemporary like-named bishops of Orkney. Roolwer's predecessor in the Isles may have been Dúnán, whose death in 1074 during the Dublin overlordship of Toirdelbach Ua Briain, King of Munster, may have enabled the ecclesiastical separation of Dublin from the Isles. The site of Roolwer's cathedral is unknown, although Maughold and St Patrick's Isle are possibilities.

== Attestation ==
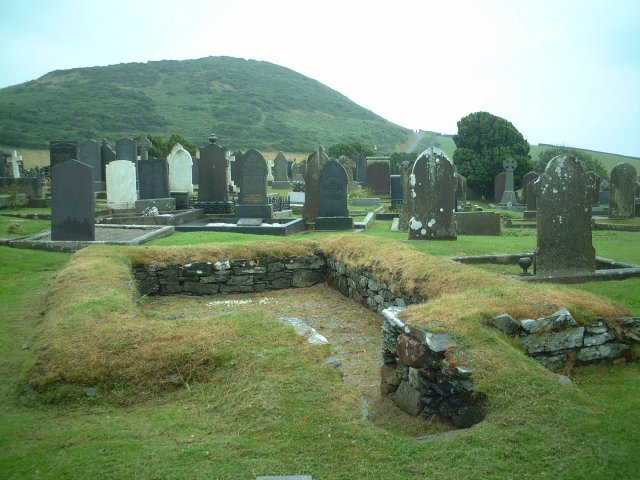
One of several ruinous keeills in the churchyard of Kirk Maughold. According to the chronicle, Roolwer was buried at the "church of St Maughold". Whether this was the site of his cathedral is unknown. (Note: Maughold was also the site of a pre-Viking Age monastery. The Manx Gaelic keeill refers to early Christian dry-stone-walled churches or oratories. Once regarded as pre-Viking Age structures, scholars now date the keeill phenomena between the late ninth- to the late thirteenth centuries.)

The ecclesiastical jurisdiction of the Kingdom of the Isles, from the mid twelfth century at least, was the Diocese of the Isles. Little is known of the early history of the diocese, although its origins may well lie with the Uí Ímair imperium. The episcopal succession of the Isles, as recorded in the Chronicle of Mann, starts its chronology at about the time of the reign of Gofraid Crobán, King of Dublin and the Isles. The first bishop to be named in the chronicle is Roolwer himself, and the form of his name preserved by this source suggests that his name is a garbled form of the Old Norse Hrólfr. The chronicle states that Roolwer was the bishop before Gofraid Crobán's reign, which could either mean that he died before the beginning of Gofraid Crobán's rule, or that Roolwer merely occupied the position at the time of Gofraid Crobán's accession.

== Contemporaries ==
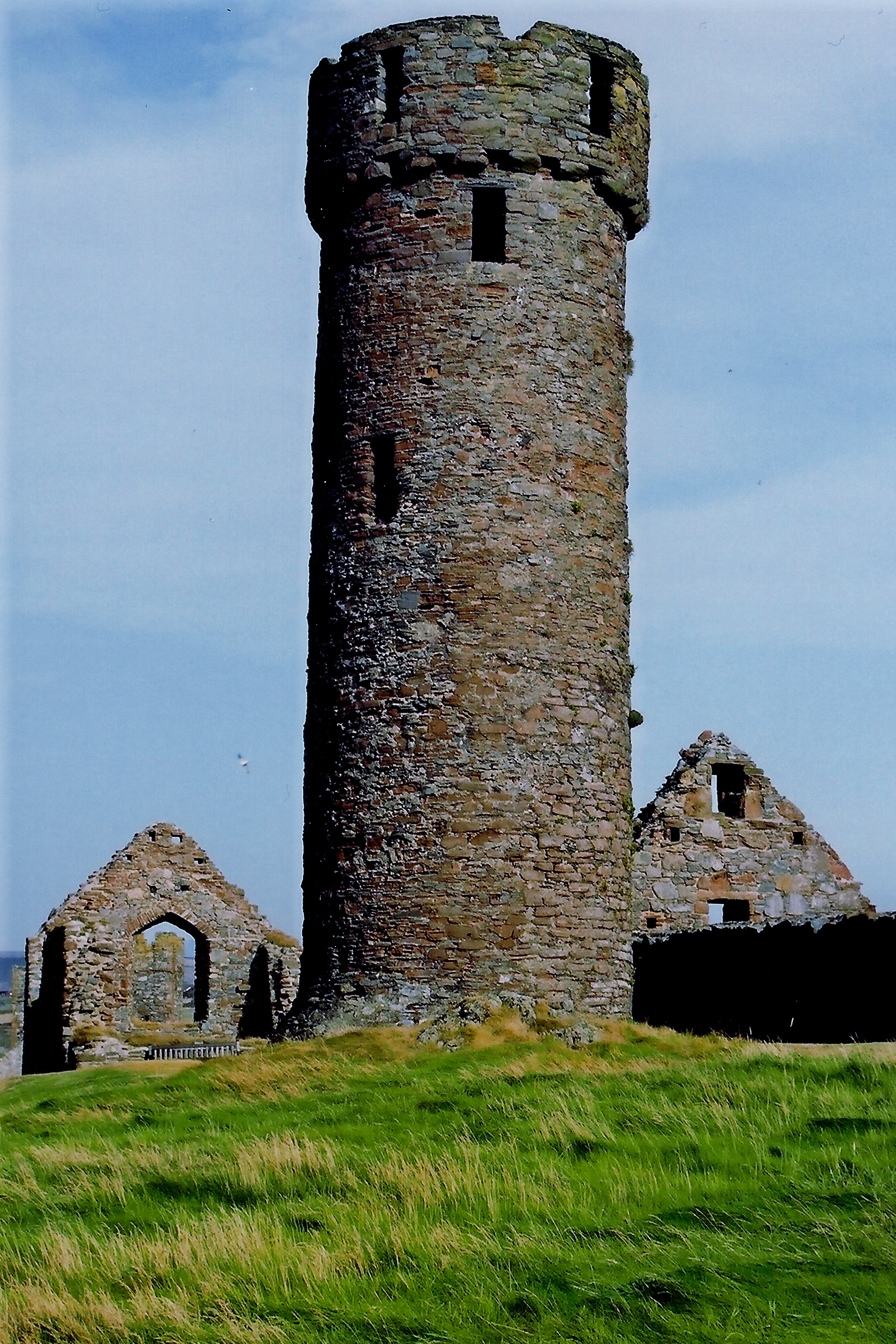
The eleventh-century stone tower on St Patrick's Isle may have been erected by Roolwer, and the island itself may have been site of his episcopal seat.

Roolwer's recorded name may be evidence that he is identical to one of the earliest bishops of Orkney. Specifically, either Thorulf (fl. 1050) or Radulf (fl. 1073). Considering the early eleventh-century Orcadian influence in the Isles, it is not inconceivable that the near contemporaneous Church in the region was then under the authority of an Orcadian appointee.

Another noted contemporary of Roolwer was Dúnán, an ecclesiast generally assumed to have been the first Bishop of Dublin. In fact, the Annals of Ulster instead accords him the title "ardespoc Gall" ("high-bishop of the Foreigners"), and the first Bishop of Dublin solely associated with Dublin is Gilla Pátraic, a man elected to the position by the Dubliners during the regime of Toirdelbach Ua Briain, King of Munster and Gofraid mac Amlaíb meic Ragnaill, King of Dublin. It is unknown if Dúnán or Roolwer himself were consecrated by the Archbishop of Canterbury, although Radulf apparently received consecration from the Archbishop of York in about 1073. The site of Roolwer's cathedral is also unknown, although it may have been seated on St Patrick's Isle. In fact, the surviving stone tower on this island appears to date to the mid eleventh century, and made have been erected by Roolwer himself.

== Separation and succession ==
There is reason to suspect that Dúnán was Roolwer's antecessor in the Isles. This would mean that when Dúnán died in 1074—only a few years after the takeover of Dublin by Toirdelbach—the latter oversaw the ecclesiastical separation of Dublin from the Isles through the creation of a new episcopal see in Dublin. Therefore, like Gilla Pátraic in Dublin, Roolwer's episcopacy in the Isles may well have begun in 1074 after Dúnán's death, and perhaps ended at some point during Gofraid Crobán's reign. The chronicle records that Roolwer was buried at the "church of St Maughold". His successor, according to the chronicle, was a certain William, a man whose Anglo-Norman or French name may cast light on his origins, and may in turn reveal Gofraid Crobán's links with the wider Anglo-Norman world. Indeed, such connections would seem to parallel those between Dublin and the Archbishop of Canterbury, forged by Gofraid Crobán's aforesaid contemporaries in Dublin, Toirdelbach and Gofraid mac Amlaíb meic Ragnaill.
