= William (bishop of the Isles) =

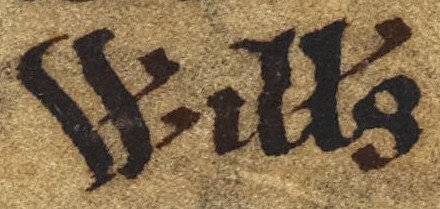
- William's name as it appears on folio 50v of British Library Cotton Julius A VII (the Chronicle of Mann): "Willelmus".
- Church: Roman Catholic Church
- Predecessor: Roolwer
- Successor: Hamond

William (died ×1095) was an eleventh-century ecclesiast. He is the second named bishop of a jurisdiction which later became the Diocese of the Isles.

William is the second named bishop recorded by the thirteenth- to fourteenth-century Chronicle of Mann. According to this source, he was the successor to Roolwer, the first named bishop. The chronicle reveals that William served at his post during the reign of Gofraid Crobán, King of Dublin and the Isles. William's Anglo-Norman or French name may cast light on his origins, and may in turn reveal Gofraid Crobán's links with the wider Anglo-Norman world. Indeed, such connections would seem to parallel those between the Dublin and the Archbishop of Canterbury, forged by Gofraid Crobán's contemporaries in Dublin, Toirdelbach Ua Briain, King of Munster and Gofraid mac Amlaíb meic Ragnaill, King of Dublin. Whatever the case, William appears to have died in or before 1095, as the chronicle states that he was succeeded, during Godred's lifetime, by a Manxman named Hamond, son of "Iole".
