= Godred Crovan =

- King of Dublin and the Isles
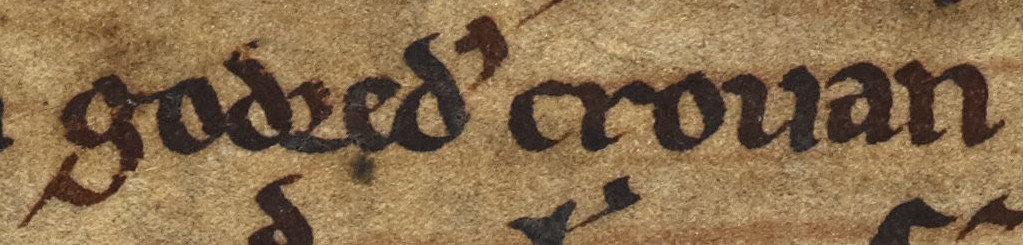
- Godred's name as it appears on folio 50v of British Library Cotton Julius A VII (the Chronicle of Mann): "Godredus Crouan"
- Died: 1095; Islay
- Burial: possibly Iona
- Issue: Lagmann, Aralt, Amlaíb
- House: Crovan dynasty (Uí Ímair)
- Father: Harald "The Black" of Islay (Harallt Ddu)

Godred Crovan (died 1095), known in Gaelic as Gofraid Crobán, Gofraid Meránach, and Gofraid Méránach, (Note: Since the 1980s, academics have accorded Godred various personal names in English secondary sources: Godfred, Godfrey, Godred, Goffraid, Goffraigh, Gofhraidh, Gofraid, Gofraidh, Goraidh, Guðrøð, Guðrøðr, and Guðröðr. Likewise, with various epithets, Godred's name has been rendered: Godfrey Crovan, Godfrey Croven, Godred Cró bán, Godred cróvan, Godred Crovan, Godred Crovan Haraldsson, Godred Crowan, Godred Méránach, Goffraid Méranach, Goffraigh Meranach, Gofhraidh Meranach, Gofraid Crobán, Gofraid Crobhan, Gofraid Meránach, Gofraid Méránach, Gofraidh Crobh-bhán, Gofraidh Mérach, Goraidh Crobhan, Guðrøð Crovan, Guðrøðr Crobán, Guðrøðr Crovan, and Guðrøðr cróvan. Since the 2010s, Godred has also been accorded the following patronyms: Gofraid mac Arailt, and Guðrøðr Haraldsson.) was a Norse-Gaelic ruler of the kingdoms of Dublin and the Isles. Although his precise parentage has not completely been proven, he was certainly an Uí Ímair dynast, and a descendant of Amlaíb Cúarán, King of Northumbria and Dublin.

Godred first appears on record in the context of supporting the Norwegian invasion of England in 1066. Following the collapse of this campaign, Godred is recorded to have arrived on Mann, at the court of Gofraid mac Sitriuc, King of the Isles, a likely kinsman of his. During the 1070s, the latter died and was succeeded by his son, Fingal. Within the decade, Godred violently seized the kingship for himself, although the exact circumstances surrounding this takeover are uncertain. By 1091, Godred attained the kingship of Dublin, and thereby secured complete control of the valuable trade routes through the Irish Sea region. Godred's expansion may be further perceptible in the Clyde estuary and Galloway, and may well have forced the English to consolidate control of Cumberland in an effort to secure their western maritime flank. Godred appears to have drawn his power from the Hebrides; and archaeological evidence from Mann reveals that, in comparison to the decades previous to his takeover, the island seems to have enjoyed a period of relative peace.

During his reign, Godred appears to have lent military assistance to Gruffudd ap Cynan, King of Gwynedd, a probable kinsman, who was then locked in continuous conflicts with Welsh rivals and encroaching English magnates. The earliest known Bishops of the Isles date from about the time of Godred's reign, although it is almost certain that earlier ecclesiastes held this position. It may have been just prior to Godred's accession in the Isles, whilst Dublin was under the ultimate control of Toirdelbach Ua Briain, King of Munster, that Dublin and the Isles were ecclesiastically separated once and for all. Godred's rule in Dublin came to an abrupt end in 1094 with his expulsion at the hands of Muirchertach Ua Briain, King of Munster, a man who may have even driven Godred from Mann as well. Documentary evidence reveals that the last decade of the eleventh century saw an upsurge in plague and famine. According to Irish sources, one quarter of Ireland perished from pestilence in 1095 alone. One of the fatalities was Godred himself, who died on Islay, an apparent power centre in the Isles.

Godred's greatest impact on history may have been his founding of the Crovan dynasty, his patrilineal descendants who ruled in the Isles for almost two centuries. Godred was an important maternal ancestor of Clann Somairle, a family that held power in the Isles centuries after the final extinction of the Crovan dynasty. As such, he may be identical to Gofraid mac Fergusa, an apparent genealogical construct claimed as a Clann Somairle ancestor. Godred may well be identical to the celebrated King Orry of Manx legend, a figure traditionally credited with instituting the Manx legal system. Godred and King Orry are associated with numerous historic and prehistoric sites on Mann and Islay.

== Familial origins ==
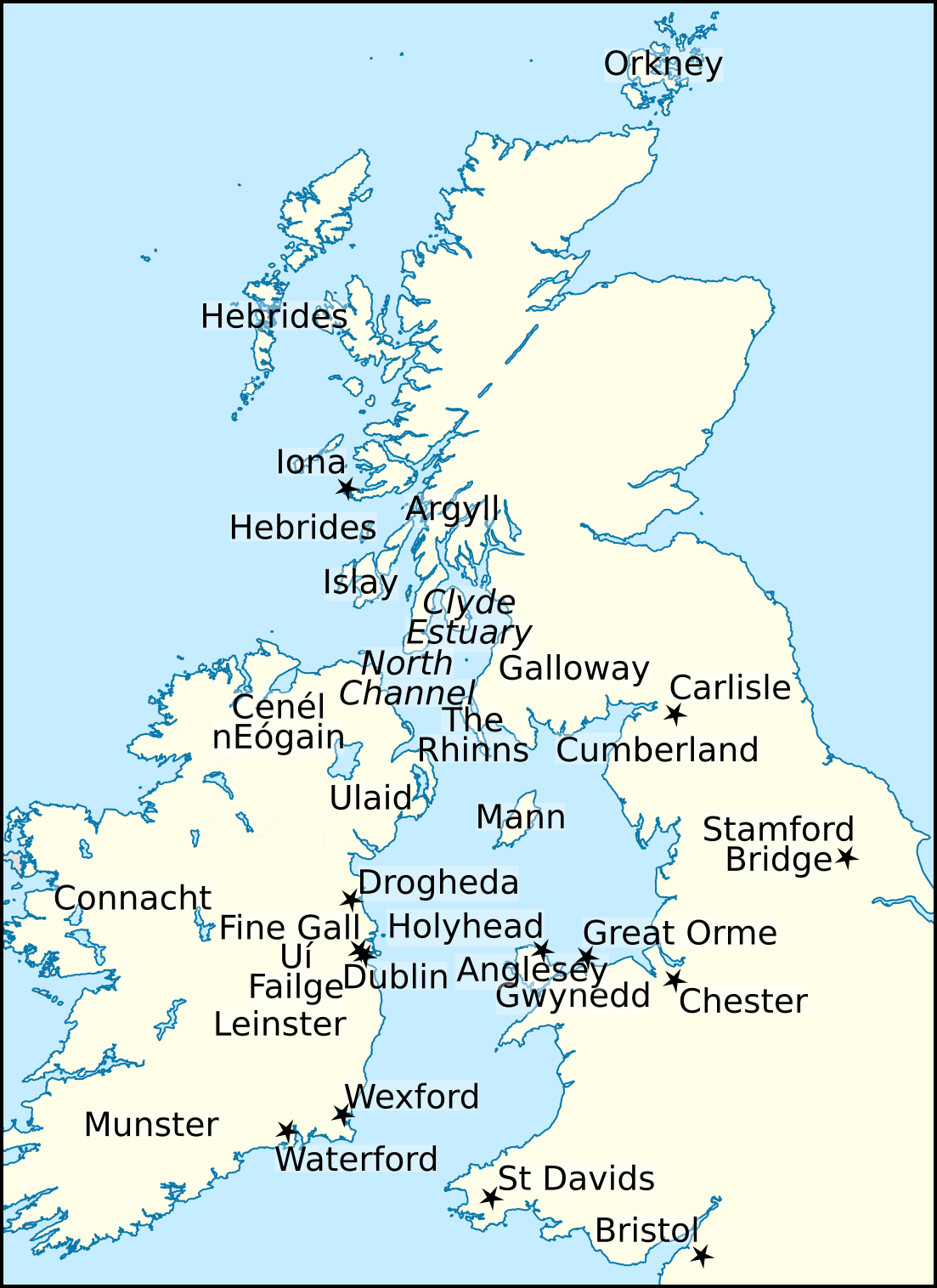
Locations relating to Godred's life and times

While the familial origins of Godred Crovan are not completely proven, it appears certain that he was a direct descendant of Amlaíb Cúarán, King of Northumbria and Dublin. Although the thirteenth- to fourteenth-century Chronicle of Mann calls him in Latin "... filius Haraldi nigri de Ysland", implying that his father was named Aralt, the fourteenth-century Annals of Tigernach instead calls him in Gaelic "... mac Maic Arailt", contrarily implying that it was Godred's grandfather who was named Aralt. Godred, therefore, may have been either a son, nephew, or brother of Ímar mac Arailt, King of Dublin. (Note: In 1044, Ímar launched a devastating raid into Armagh. The Annals of Tigernach, which notes this enterprise, does not call him by his personal name but merely identifies him as a son of Aralt. This could be evidence that Ímar's contemporaries sometimes knew him by his patronym alone. If this was indeed the case, and if Godred was, in fact, Ímar's son, it could also explain how later chroniclers garbled the name of Godred's father.) However, the early-thirteenth-century pedigree Achau Brenhinoedd a Thywysogion Cymru in the Welsh collection of genealogical tracts records "Gwrthryt Mearch" (Godred Crovan) as the son of "Harallt Ddu" (Harald "The Black" of Islay), who in turn was the son of "Ifor Gamle" (Ímar mac Arailt). As such, it appears that Godred was not the son, nephew or brother, but, in fact, the grandson of Ímar mac Arailt, King of Dublin, patrilineal descendant of Amlaíb Cúarán, King of Northumbria and Dublin, and member of the Uí Ímair. The chronicle's passage may further cast light on Godred's familial origins. Although "Ysland" may represent Iceland, there is no other evidence linking Godred to this island. Alternately, the word may instead represent the Hebridean island of Islay, where he is otherwise known to have ended his life. Another possibility is that "Ysland" represents Ireland, which, if correct, would evidence Godred's close familial links with that particular island. (Note: The Old Norse form of Iceland is Ísland, and the usual Latin form is Islandia. The chronicle elsewhere refers to Islay as "Yle".) Whatever the case, according to the same source, he had been brought up on Mann. (Note: The late-mediaeval Welsh genealogical tract Achau Brenhinoedd a Thywysogion Cymru preserves a pedigree concerning an early thirteenth-century descendant of Godred, Ragnall mac Gofraid, King of the Isles. The pedigree runs: "Rhanallt m. Gwythryg ap Afloyd m. Gwrthryt Mearch m. Harallt Ddu m. Ifor Gamle m. Afloyd m. Swtrig". The "Gwrthryt Mearch" refers to Godred, whilst "Harallt Ddu" conforms to the chronicle's "Haraldi nigri de Ysland" (the Welsh du and Latin niger both mean "black"). The pedigree's "Ifor Gamle" appears to represent the Old Norse Ívarr gamli (the Old Norse gamli is a weak declension of gamall, meaning "old"). An historical candidate for the pedigree's "Afloyd m. Swtrig" may be Amlaíb Cúarán, whose father was Sitriuc Cáech, King of Northumbria and Dublin. It is possible that the pedigree's "Ifor Gamle" represents Ímar. The fact that the latter's father is known to have been named Aralt, however, could be evidence that the compiler of the pedigree either erroneously reversed the order of "Harallt Ddu" and "Ifor Gamle", or else missed an additional Aralt in the lineage.)

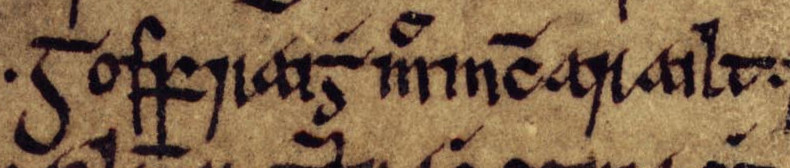
Godred's name as it appears on folio 19v of Oxford Bodleian Library Rawlinson B 488 (the Annals of Tigernach): "Goffraidh mac Maic Arailt"

When Godred is first noted by the Latin Chronicle of Mann, he is accorded the epithet "Crouan" or "Crovan". The origin and meaning of this name are uncertain. It may well be derived from the Gaelic crob bhán ("white-handed"). Another Gaelic origin may be cró bán ("white-blooded"), in reference to being very pale. Alternately, it could originate from the Gaelic crúbach ("claw"). If the epithet is instead Old Norse in origin, it could be derived from kruppin ("cripple"). In several Irish annals, Godred is accorded the epithet meranach. This word could represent either the Gaelic meránach ("mad", "confused", "giddy"); or else méránach (which can also be rendered mérach), a word derived from mér ("finger" or "toe"). If meranach indeed corresponds to the latter meaning, the epithet would appear to mirror Crouan/Crovan, and imply something remarkable about Godred's hands. (Note: The Gaelic epithet Crobán, taken to mean "white-claw", has sometimes been accorded to Godred in recent scholarly secondary sources. Godred's epithet is apparently not unlike that of the later Cathal Crobderg Ua Conchobair, King of Connacht, whose epithet, from the Gaelic crob dhearg, means "red-handed".) Godred and his patrilineal royal descendants, who reigned in the Isles for about two centuries, are known to modern scholars as the Crovan dynasty, a name coined after Godred himself. The combination of Old Norse personal names and Gaelic epithets accorded to Godred, and his dynastic descendants, partly evidence the hybrid nature of the Norse-Gaelic Kingdom of the Isles.

== Background ==
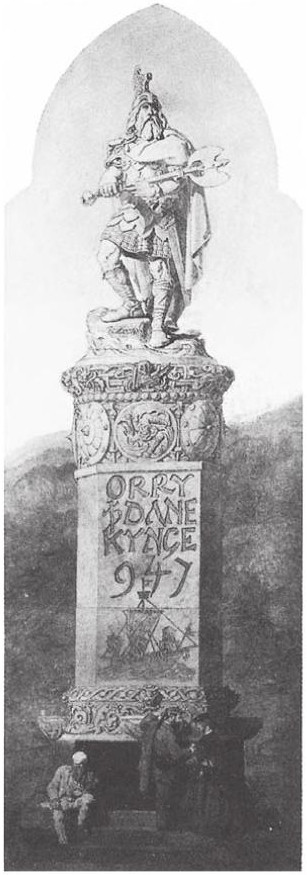
Proposed mid-nineteenth-century monument to King Orry, a legendary figure who may be identical to Godred

One of the foremost leaders of the eleventh-century Norse world was Þórfinnr Sigurðarson, Earl of Orkney, a man whose maritime empire, like that of his father before him, stretched from Orkney to the Isles, and perhaps even into Ireland as well. Þórfinnr died in about 1065, and was succeeded by his two sons, Páll and Erlendr. Unfortunately for the brothers, the expansive island empire that their father had forged appears to have quickly disintegrated under their joint rule. Although there is no record of the brothers conducting military operations in the Isles and Ireland, the thirteenth-century Orkneyinga saga states that the peripheral regions of their father's lordship reverted to the control of local leaders. It was into this power vacuum that Godred first emerges into recorded history.

The ruler of the Isles who appears to have suffered from Þórfinnr's southward expansion was Echmarcach mac Ragnaill, King of Dublin and the Isles. The turn of the mid-eleventh century saw the gradual decline of Echmarcach's authority. In 1052, he was driven from Dublin by Diarmait mac Maíl na mBó, King of Leinster. Although there is evidence to suggest that Diarmait reinstated Ímar as King of Dublin, the latter was dead within two years, and at some point Diarmait appears to have placed his own son, Murchad, upon the throne. About a decade after Diarmait's conquest of Dublin, an invasion of Mann by Murchad appears to have resulted in the submission or expulsion of Echmarcach altogether, effectively giving Diarmait control over the Irish Sea region. When Murchad died in 1070, Diarmait assumed control of Dublin and perhaps Mann as well.

The ruler of Mann in about 1066 was Gofraid mac Sitriuc, King of the Isles, a man who appears to have reigned under Diarmait's overlordship. Like Godred himself, Gofraid mac Sitriuc may have been a descendant of Amlaíb Cúarán. (Note: There is uncertainty in regard to Gofraid mac Sitriuc's ancestry.) On Diarmait's unexpected death in 1072, Toirdelbach Ua Briain, King of Munster invaded Leinster, and acquired control of Dublin. Within a year of gaining lordship over the Dubliners, Toirdelbach appears to have installed, or at least recognised a certain Gofraid mac Amlaíb meic Ragnaill as their king. In fact, this man appears to have been a close kinsman of Echmarcach, possibly his nephew. As such, Gofraid mac Amlaíb meic Ragnaill seems to have been a member of a Norse-Gaelic kindred possessing close marital links with the Uí Briain. (Note: Toirdelbach's son, Tadc, was certainly married to a daughter of Echmarcach. Furthermore, it is possible that Donnchad mac Briain, King of Munster had previously married, Cacht ingen Ragnaill, a sister or niece of Echmarcach.) Such links may well explain the remarkable rapidity with which the Uí Briain struck out at Dublin and the Isles after Diarmait's demise. In 1073, for instance, Mann was raided by a certain Sitriuc mac Amlaíb and two grandsons of the Uí Briain founder, Brian Bóruma, High King of Ireland. Whilst there is reason to suspect that Sitriuc was a brother of Gofraid mac Amlaíb meic Ragnaill, the attack itself was almost certainly a continuation of the Uí Briain's conquest of Dublin the year before.

== Emergence in the Isles ==
Romanticised nineteenth-century depictions of Godred Crovan. Vikings were first associated with unhistorical horned helmets early that century.

Godred seems to have spent his early career as a mercenary of sorts. Certainly the Chronicle of Mann states that he took part in the ill-fated Norwegian invasion of England in 1066. This Norwegian campaign culminated in the Battle of Stamford Bridge, a bloody autumn encounter in which Harold Godwinson, King of England utterly destroyed the forces of Haraldr Sigurðarson, King of Norway in north-eastern England. The slaughter at Stamford resulted in the total destruction of Norwegian military power, and it took almost a generation before a king of this realm could reassert authority in the Norse colonies of the British Isles. If the eleventh-century chronicler Adam of Bremen is to be believed, an Irish king was slain during the battle, which could indicate that Godred formed part of the Irish Sea contingent, a host perhaps led by the slain king. At any rate, it was in the aftermath of this defeat that the chronicle first notes Godred: stating that, following his flight from the battle, Godred sought sanctuary from Gofraid mac Sitriuc, and was honourably received by him. Godred's participation in the Norwegian enterprise, which was also supported by the sons of Þórfinnr, partly evidences the far-flung connections and interactions of the contemporary Norse elite.

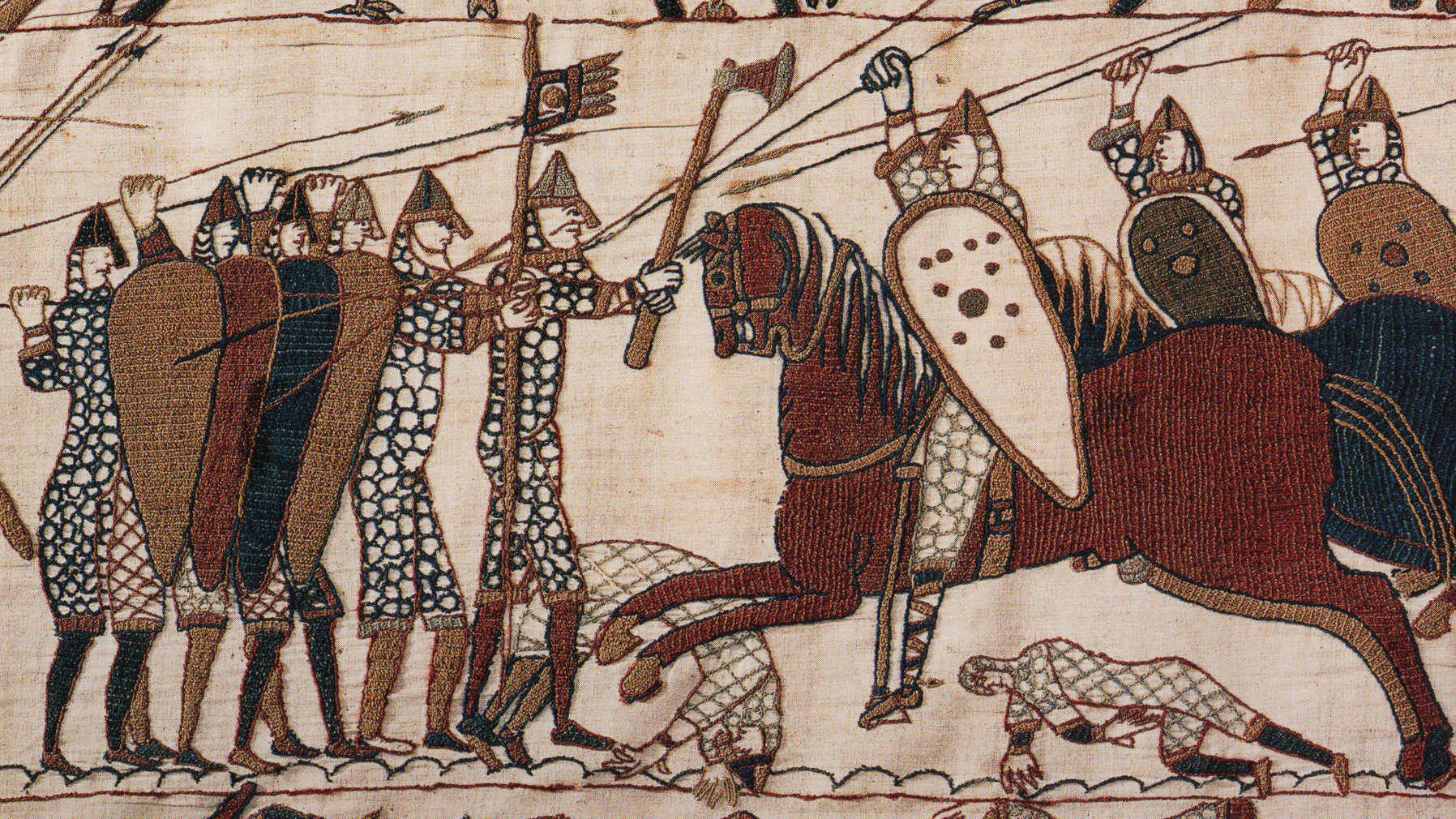
A depiction of English infantry and Norman cavalry on the eleventh-century Bayeux Tapestry. In the course of his career, Godred appears to have battled both Anglo-Saxon and Anglo-Norman forces. The depicted infantry are shown formed in a shield wall, a tactic employed by the Norwegian-backed forces at Stamford Bridge.

Godred's arrival on Mann, rather than Dublin, may well be explained by the varying political alignments in the Irish Sea region. Whilst he had allied himself to the cause of the invading Haraldr, the cause of the defending Harold was clearly adhered to by Diarmait, the contemporary overlord of Dublin. In fact, the latter seems to have lent Harold's family—the Godwinsons—assistance in the decade before the Norwegian invasion. He later sheltered Harold's sons following the eventual English defeat at the hands of the Normans, and further gave the Godwinsons military assistance in their insurrections against the new Norman regime in 1068 and 1069.

Regardless of Godred's possible ancestral links with Ireland, his political leanings could have meant that Dublin was unsafe for him in 1066. Another factor influencing Godred's arrival on Mann may have been the absence of Echmarcach—Gofraid mac Sitriuc's predecessor and Ímar's bitter adversary—at some point earlier in the decade. As for Gofraid mac Sitriuc himself, the generosity that he showed Godred could well be explained if the two were indeed kinsmen. Whatever the case, the former's death is recorded in 1070, after which his son, Fingal, apparently succeeded to the kingship. Possibly in about 1075, or 1079, the chronicle reveals that Godred succeeded in conquering Mann following three sea-borne invasions. On one hand, it is possible that Godred overthrew Fingal, who may have been weakened by the Uí Briain assault on the island in 1073. On the other hand, the amiable relations between Godred and Fingal's father could suggest that, as long as Fingal lived his kingship was secure, and that it was only after his death that Godred attempted to seize control.

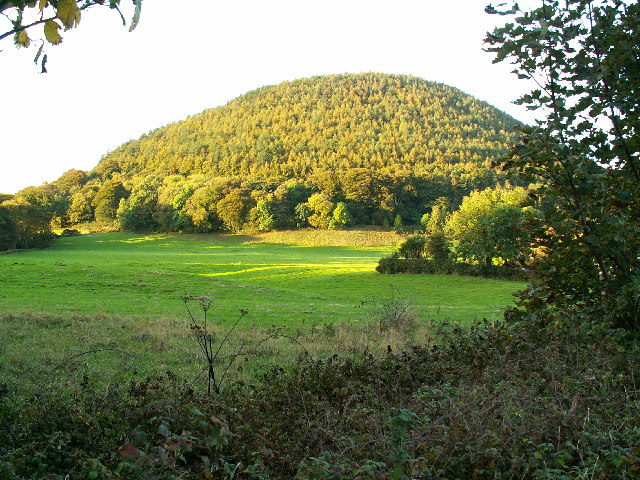
Sky Hill, where Godred is said to have vanquished the Manx once and for all. According to the chronicle, some of his troops hid in the wood surrounding the hill, and his victory was achieved when they ambushed the unsuspecting Manx from the rear.

Godred's power base may have been located in the Hebrides, the northern reaches of the realm. After his takeover of Mann, a conquest that culminated in the Battle of Sky Hill, the chronicle claims that Godred offered his followers the choice of either plundering the island or of settling upon it. Only a few of his Islesmen are stated to have remained with him on Mann. According to the chronicle, Godred granted the incomers lands in the south of the island, and allowed the natives lands in the north, on the condition that they give up all heritable rights to this territory. It was through this act, alleges the chronicle, that Godred's later successors owned the entirety of the island. This portrayal of Godred's takeover—in which a conqueror establishes his dynasty's dominance over the traditional rights of a native landholding populace—parallels the traditional mediaeval accounts of Haraldr hárfagri, a king traditionally said to have deprived Norwegian landholders their heritable óðal rights.

Although several place names on Mann appear to date to the tenth- and eleventh-centuries, stemming from direct settlement from Norway or Norwegian colonies in Scotland and the Isles, many Manx place names that contain the Old Norse element -bý appear to have been coined by later settlers from Denmark or the Danelaw. Some of these settlers would have arrived on the island from the Danelaw in the tenth century, whilst others could have arrived in the course of Godred's conquest. In fact, as late as the sixteenth century some of the island's most considerable lands contained this word element. (Note: English settlement in the early fifteenth century could also have introduced some of these place names. There is uncertainty as to when the Norse first settled on Mann. It is conceivable, however, that colonisation began at some point in the early ninth century, at about the same time that other regions in Scotland and the Isles were being settled. Such a date is supported by archaeological evidence in the form of several grave sites.) Further after-effects of Godred's conquest may perceptible by numismatic evidence. Almost twenty mediaeval silver hoards have been uncovered on Mann. Almost a dozen date between the 1030s and the 1070s. The finds seem to suggest that the island suffered from power struggles until the establishment of Godred and his descendants.

== Domination of Dublin and the Irish Sea ==
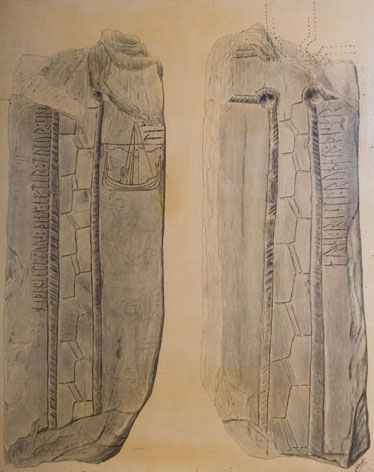
Image a

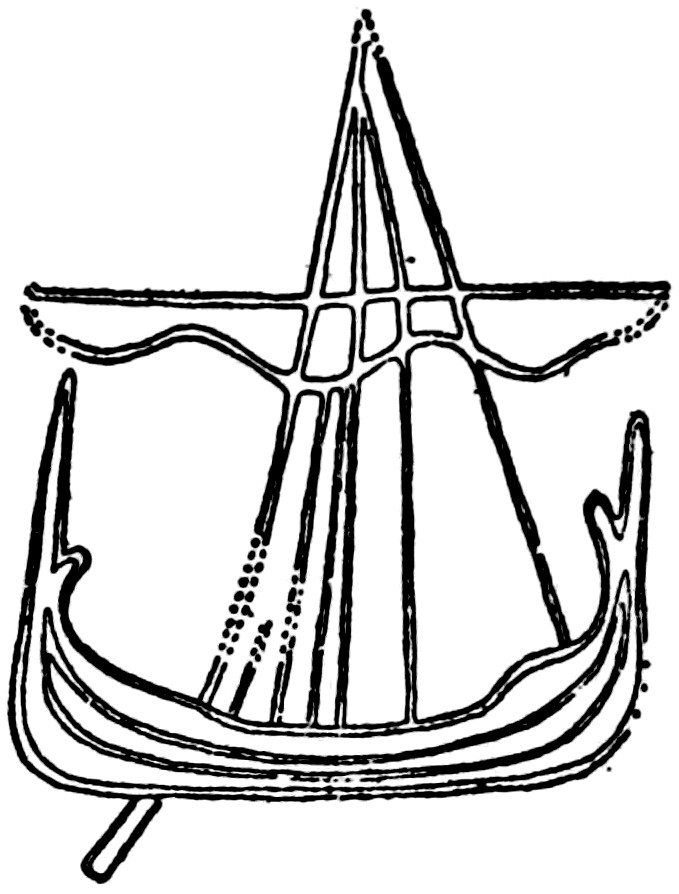
Image b

Maughold IV (image a; detail, image b), a Manx runestone displaying a contemporary sailing vessel. The power of the kings of the Isles laid in their armed galley-fleets (Note: The inscription of the boat may date to about the time of the Crovan dynasty, possibly from about the eleventh- to the thirteenth century. The boat itself appears to be similar to those that appear on seals borne by later members of the dynasty.)

The Annals of Tigernach and the Chronicle of Mann evidence Godred's conquest of the Kingdom of Dublin in about 1091. Specifically, the former source accords him the title "King of Dublin" that year, whilst the latter source claims that he subjugated all of Dublin and much of Leinster. Although the chronicle's statement regarding Leinster is almost certainly an exaggeration, it may well refer to the seizure of the full extent of Fine Gall, and the extension of royal authority over adjoining regions. (Note: Fine Gall formed a distinct part of Dublin's valuable agricultural hinterland, which in turn supplied the town with essential raw materials. As such, Fine Gall was frequently preyed upon by powers wishing to gain dominance over Dublin. The geographical extent of Fine Gall appears to roughly correspond to the boundary of modern Fingal. The place name Fine Gall literally means "kindred of the foreigners", or "territory of the foreigners".) Dublin's political affiliation at about this period in time is uncertain. In 1088, Donnchad mac Domnaill Remair, King of Leinster seems to have utilised troops from Dublin in his attack on Waterford. Whilst within the same year, troops from Dublin, Waterford, and Wexford were repulsed in an attack on Cork by the Uí Echach Mumain. The following year, Donnchad is further accorded the title rí Gall, which suggests that he ruled Dublin by this point. Muirchertach Ua Briain, King of Munster certainly gained authority over Dublin within the year, although the fact that the annal-entry evidencing Godred's kingship there in 1091 contains no verb could suggest that he too reigned in Dublin as early as 1089. Whatever the case, Godred's acquisition of this coastal settlement may well have been a strike of sheer opportunism in which he took advantage of the ongoing conflict between the kingdoms of Munster and Leinster. His probable familial links with Dublin could have contributed to his remarkable success as well, and it is possible that the Dubliners considered this conquest as a restoration of the kingdom's royal family. Certainly his conquests in the Irish Sea region amounted to the reunification of the Uí Ímair imperium, and appear to be evidence that contemporaries regarded Dublin and Mann to be components of a single political entity, with the ruler of one part entitled to that of the other.

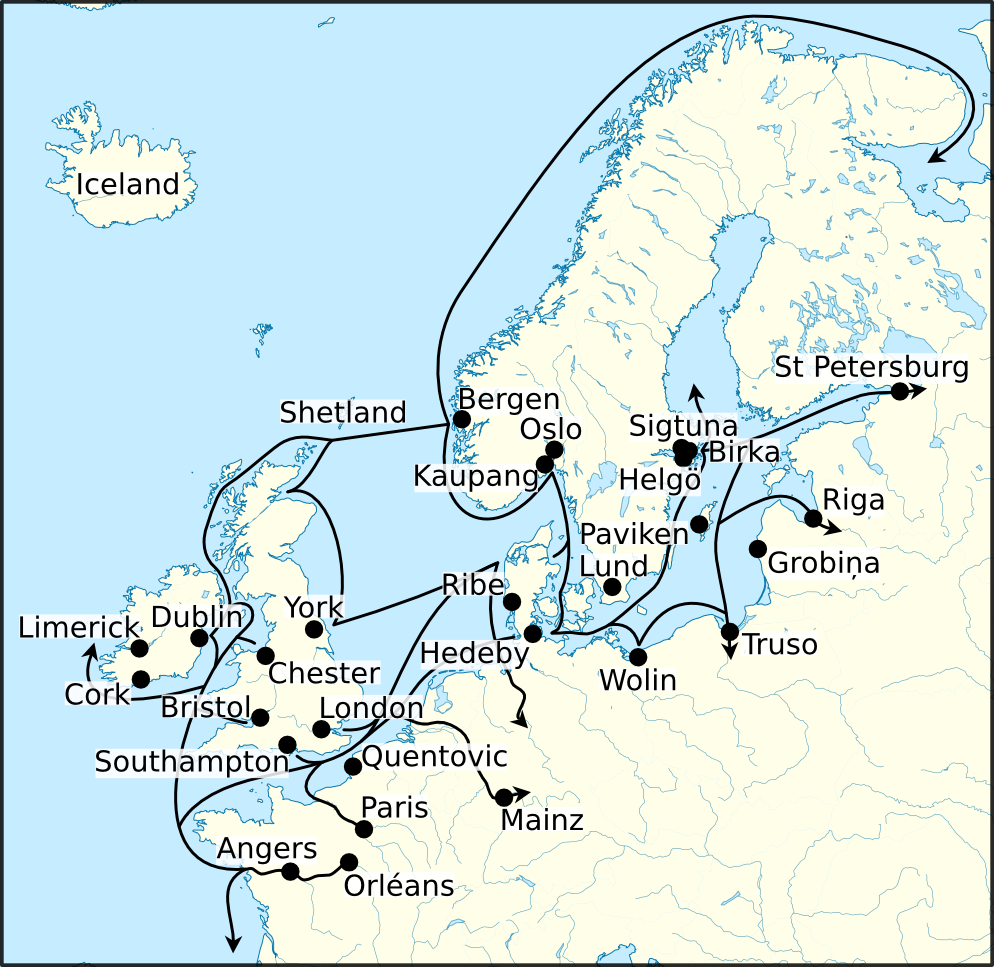
Viking Age trade routes in north-west Europe. As the ruler of Dublin and the Isles, Godred dominated the routes through the Irish Sea region.

Despite Godred's apparent ancestral connections to the kingdoms of Dublin and the Isles, his rise to power could well have been driven by economic realities as much as royal aspirations. Dublin was one of the wealthiest ports in western Europe. By the end of the eleventh century, it was the most important population centre in Ireland. There appear to have been three main routes in the region: one running from southern Wales to south-eastern Ireland (connecting the settlements of Waterford and Wexford in Ireland, with Bristol and St Davids in Wales); another route running from the river Dee in northern Wales to Mann itself, and to the rivers Liffey and Boyne in Ireland (thereby connecting the ports of Chester and Holyhead in Wales, with those of Dublin and Drogheda in Ireland); the third trade route running perpendicular to the aforementioned, extending south to the Continent and north through the Hebrides to Iceland, Orkney, Shetland, Scandinavia, and the Baltic region. Godred's conquest of Dublin, therefore, could have been undertaken in the context of an Islesman securing possession of the region's southernmost routes, thereby giving him total control of the Irish Sea trade nexus. According to the Chronicle of Mann, Godred "held the Scots in such subjection that no one who built a vessel dared to insert more than three bolts", a statement implying his maritime dominance over contemporaries. (Note: The so-called "Scots" in this passage could refer to subjects of either Godred or the Scottish Crown. On the other hand, the passage may concern Irishmen, or possibly to maritime magnates from Galloway and Argyll who potentially could have threatened the Islesmen's communication lines. The specific meaning of the passage is somewhat uncertain. Conceivably, the bolts may have been instrumental in constructing keels that were too large to be made of a single timber. Another possibility is that the bolts fixed stern and stem-pieces to the keel. Either way, the passage appears to refer to the Islesmen restricting the size of the boats built by contemporaries. As such, the record may be evidence that typical naval vessels of the era, such as snekkar and skeiðar, were under royal regulation.) The naval power of the Islesmen is perhaps evidenced in known military cooperation between the Islesmen—perhaps including Godred himself—and Gruffudd ap Cynan, King of Gwynedd, in the last decade of the eleventh century.

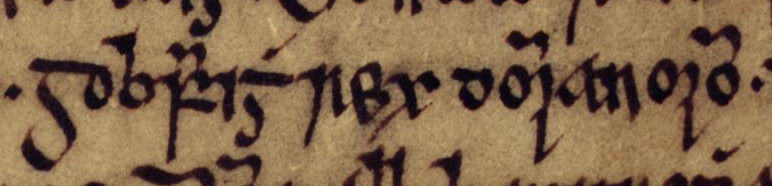
Godred's name and title as it appears on folio 19v of Oxford Bodleian Library Rawlinson B 488: "Goffraidh rex Normannorum"

Further expansion of Godred's authority may be perceptible in the Clyde estuary and Galloway, where place names and church dedications suggest Isles-based Norse-Gaelic influence and rule from the ninth- to eleventh centuries. There is also evidence suggesting that, following Fingal's disappearance from the historical record, Fingal's descendants ruled in parts of Galloway. Specifically, in 1094, the eleventh- to fourteenth-century Annals of Inisfallen record the death of a certain King of the Rhinns named "Macc Congail", whose recorded patronym may represent confusion between the names Fingal and Congal. Whatever the case, it is unknown if Macc Congail was independent from, or dependent upon, Godred's authority. Godred's interference in this part of the Irish Sea region could explain an unsuccessful invasion on Mann in 1087. That year, the fifteenth- to sixteenth-century Annals of Ulster record that an unnamed Ulaid dynast, and two "sons of the son of Ragnall"—perhaps sons of Echmarcach, Gofraid mac Amlaíb meic Ragnaill, or the latter's father—lost their lives in the assault. On one hand, the apparent involvement of Echmarcach's family in this attack appears to evince an attempt to restore themselves on Mann. Additionally, the Ulaid's actions appear to mirror their own response to Dublin-based intrusion into the North Channel earlier in the century, and the fact that the attack took place in the year after Toirdelbach's death could indicate that the Ulaid seized upon the resulting confusion amongst the Uí Briain. On the other hand, it is possible that raid was actually an Uí Briain initiative, conducted in the context of an ongoing internal power struggle within the kindred. If so, the attack could have been undertaken by Echmarcach's family at the connivance of the Meic Taidc—a branch of the Uí Briain matrilineally descended from Echmarcach—who may have used the operation as a means of preventing Mann from falling into the hands of their rival uncle, Muirchertach. Although the latter was certainly in the midst of securing control of Dublin, it is questionable whether he was in any position to contemplate operations in the Irish Sea at this point. In fact, Godred was nearing the height of his own power, and it is unclear if the Meic Taidc enjoyed more amiable relations with the Ulaid than Muirchertach himself. (Note: The Meic Taidc were descended from Muirchertach's brother, Tadc. According to the twelfth-century Banshenchas, Tadc was married to Echmarcach's daughter, Mór, and the two had three sons and a daughter. Toirdelbach's death in 1086 sent the Uí Briain into a succession crisis, and his three sons—Muirchertach, Diarmait Ua Briain, and Tadc himself—divided Munster between themselves. When Tadc died almost immediately afterwards, Muirchertach seized complete control of the kingdom, and drove Diarmait into exile. As for the Ulaid, they certainly possessed familial links with the Uí Briain, albeit through the marriage of Donn Sléibe mac Eochada, King of Ulaid to a daughter of Toirdelbach's bitter rival, Cennétig mac Lorcáin, a great-grandson of Brian Bóruma.) At any rate, Godred's expansion into Dublin could have been undertaken in the aftermath of his successful defence of the island.

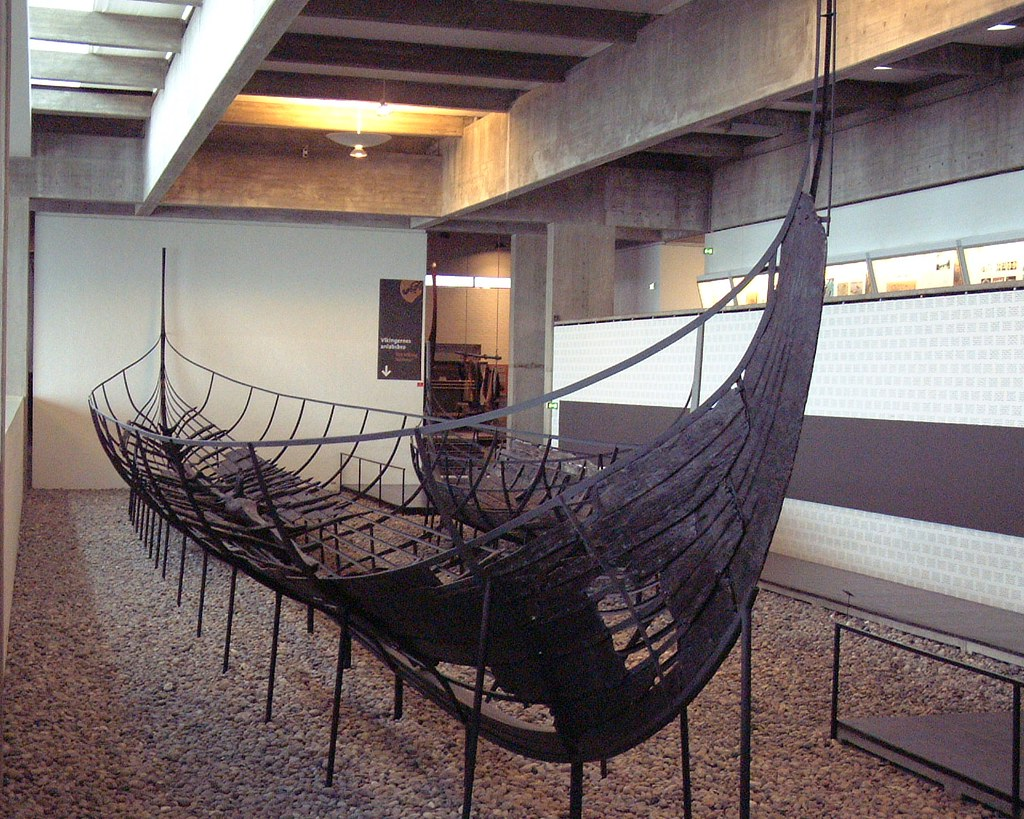
Image a

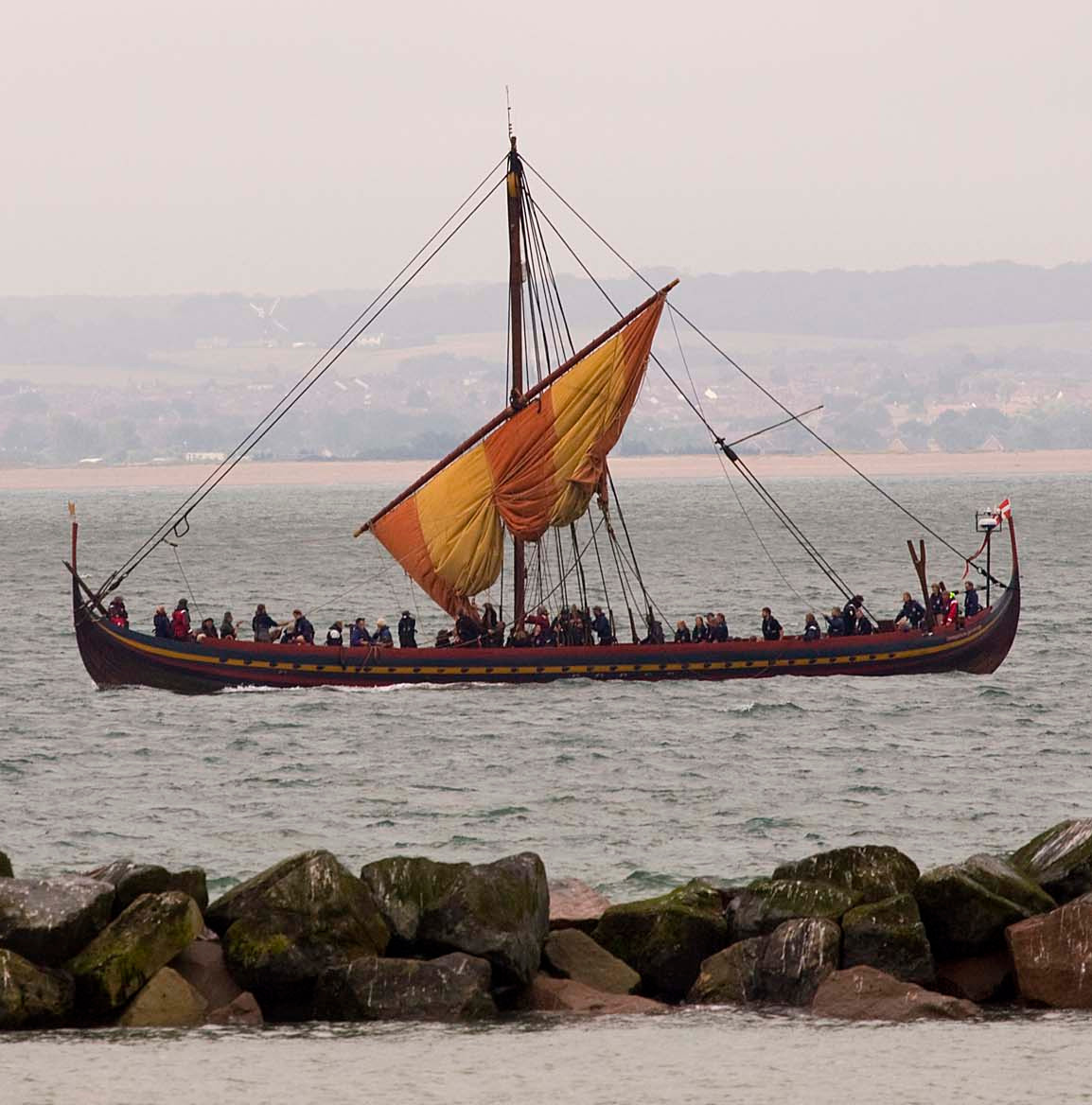
Image b

Skuldelev II (image a), a contemporary Viking longboat uncovered in Denmark, was originally built of oak from Ireland or specifically Dublin, and dates to about Godred's floruit. It may have been commissioned during the reign of Ímar mac Arailt. Havhingsten fra Glendalough (image b), a modern Danish reconstruction of Skuldelev II.

Godred's expansion in the Irish Sea may well have had serious repercussions on mainland politics. Certainly, in the eyes of Máel Coluim mac Donnchada, King of Alba, the prospect of Godred's expansion into the Solway region would have been a threatening development. Furthermore, in the last decades of the eleventh century there was a breakdown in relations between Máel Coluim and William II, King of England. In 1091, Máel Coluim led the Scots across their southern border. Although peace was subsequently restored without bloodshed, the temporary truce fell apart the following year when William seized Cumberland, and established an English colony at Carlisle. Although this northern advance is sometimes regarded as an attempt to keep the Scots in check, the operation also established English control over Norse-Gaelic coastal populations, and further secured England's vulnerable north-western maritime flank. Godred's conquest of Dublin the year before, therefore, may well have influenced William's strategy in the north-west.

== The early dioceses of Dublin and the Isles ==
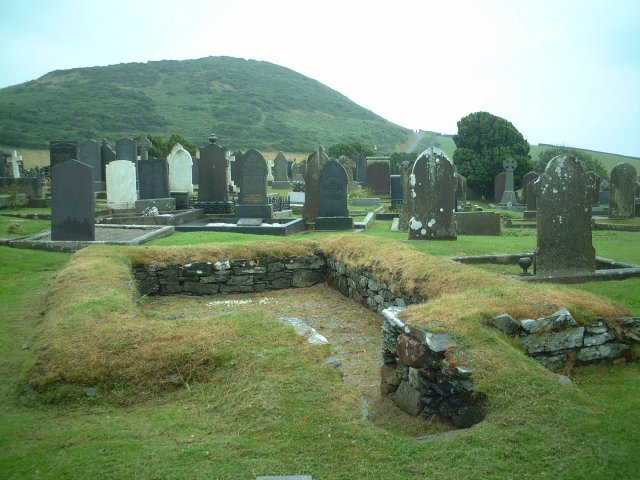
One of several ruinous keeills in the churchyard of Kirk Maughold. According to the chronicle, Roolwer was buried at the "church of St Maughold". Whether this was the site of his cathedral is unknown. (Note: Maughold was also the site of a pre-Viking Age monastery. The Manx Gaelic keeill refers to early Christian dry-stone-walled churches or oratories. Once regarded as pre-Viking Age structures, scholars now date the keeill phenomena between the late ninth to the late thirteenth centuries. Another candidate for the site of Roolwer's cathedral is St Patrick's Isle. The surviving stone tower on this island appears to date to the mid eleventh century, and made have been erected by Roolwer himself.)

The ecclesiastical jurisdiction within the Isles during the reigns of Godred's mid-twelfth-century successors was the Diocese of the Isles. Little is known of the early history of the diocese, although its origins may well lie with the Uí Ímair imperium. Unfortunately, the Chronicle of Mann's coverage of the episcopal succession only starts at about the time of Godred's reign. The bishop first mentioned by this source is a certain "Roolwer", whose recorded name appears to be a garbled form of the Old Norse Hrólfr. The chronicle records that Roolwer was the bishop before Godred's reign, which could either mean that he died before the beginning of Godred's rule, or that Roolwer merely occupied the position at the time of Godred's accession. Roolwer's recorded name may be evidence that he is identical to one of the earliest bishops of Orkney. Specifically, either Thorulf or Radulf. Considering the evidence of early-eleventh-century Orcadian influence in the Isles, it is not inconceivable that the near contemporaneous Church in the region was then under the authority of an Orcadian appointee.

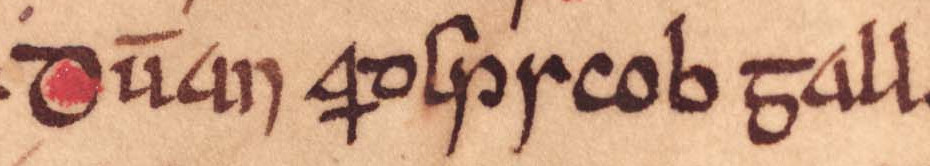
The name and title of Dúnán as it appears on folio 43v of Oxford Bodleian Library Rawlinson B 489 (the Annals of Ulster)

A noted contemporary of Roolwer was Dúnán, an ecclesiast generally assumed to have been the first Bishop of Dublin. In fact, the Annals of Ulster instead accords him the title "ardespoc Gall" ("high-bishop of the Foreigners"), and the first Bishop of Dublin solely associated with Dublin is Gilla Pátraic, a man elected to the position by the Dubliners during the regime of Toirdelbach and Gofraid mac Amlaíb meic Ragnaill. (Note: The fact that, after Gilla Pátraic was consecrated by Lanfranc, Archbishop of Canterbury, the latter sent correspondence to both Gofraid (called "glorioso Hiberniae regi") and Toirdelbach (called "magnifico Hibernie regi"), suggests that Gofraid had little independence from his Irish overlord, Toirdelbach.)

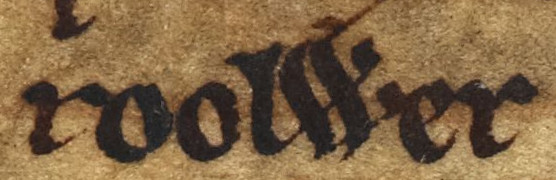
Roolwer's name as it appears on folio 50v of British Library Cotton Julius A VII (the Chronicle of Mann). The name appears to be a form of Hrólfr, which could be evidence that he is identical to one of the earliest-known bishops of Orkney.

Dúnán's title could indicate that he held episcopal authority in the Irish Sea region outwith the bounds of Dublin. As such, there is reason to suspect that he was Roolwer's antecessor in the Isles. When Dúnán died in 1074, only a few years after Toirdelbach's takeover of Dublin, it is possible that the latter seized this opportunity and oversaw the ecclesiastical separation of Dublin from the Isles through the creation of a new episcopal see in Dublin. If so, Roolwer's episcopacy in the Isles may well have begun in 1074 after Dúnán's death—just like Gilla Pátraic's episcopacy in Dublin—and perhaps ended at some point during Godred's reign. The chronicle reveals that Roolwer's successor was a certain William, whose Anglo-Norman or French name may cast light on his origins, and may in turn evince Godred's links with the wider Anglo-Norman world. Indeed, such connections would seem to parallel those between Dublin and the Archbishop of Canterbury, forged by Godred's contemporaries in Dublin, Toirdelbach and Gofraid mac Amlaíb meic Ragnaill. William appears to have died in or before 1095, as the chronicle states that he was succeeded, during Godred's lifetime, by a Manxman named Hamond, son of "Iole".

== Involvement in Wales ==
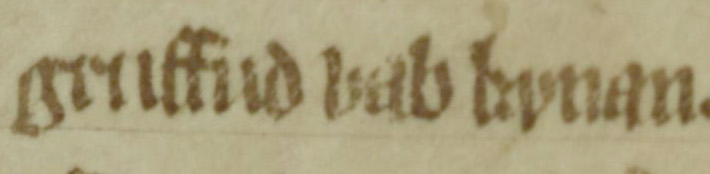
The name of Gruffudd ap Cynan as it appears on folio 254r of Oxford Jesus College 111 (the Red Book of Hergest): "gruffud vab kynan"

One of the most significant eleventh- and twelfth-century Welsh figures was Gruffudd, a man who fended off fellow dynasts and Anglo-Normans alike to establish himself in northern Wales. Throughout much of the last two decades of the eleventh century Gwynedd was occupied by ever encroaching Anglo-Normans; and it is apparent that Gruffudd enjoyed close connections with the Norse-Gaelic world. Specifically, the thirteenth-century Historia Gruffud vab Kenan reveals that, not only was Gruffudd born and raised in Dublin, he was yet another distinguished descendant of Amlaíb Cúarán, and that on several occasions Gruffudd availed himself of Norse-Gaelic military assistance. After an apparent lull of about two decades, there was a remarkable increase in Norse-Gaelic predatory raids upon Wales throughout the 1070s and 1080s. In fact, this resurgence coincides with Gruffudd's struggle for power, and may not be an unrelated coincidence.

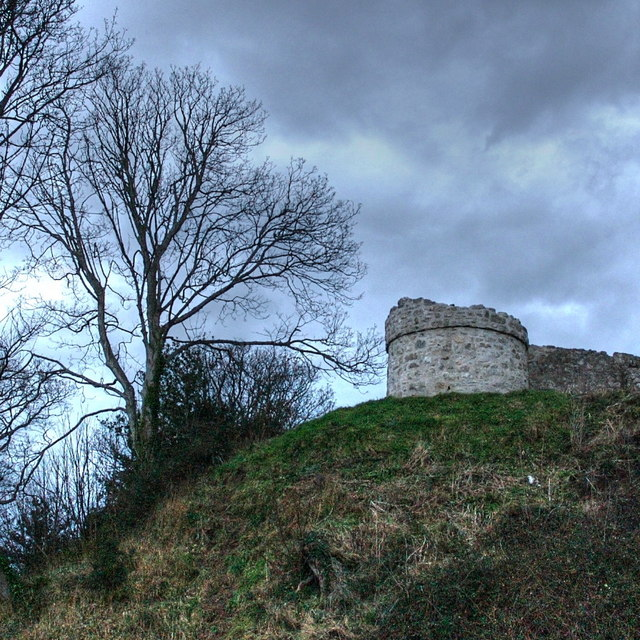
Godred could well have assisted Gruffudd in attacking the Anglo-Norman castle of Aberlleiniog on Anglesey.

At one point in his career, after briefly gaining power in 1081, Gruffudd was captured by Hugh d'Avranches, Earl of Chester, and appears to have been held captive for over a decade, perhaps twelve years. According to Historia Gruffud vab Kenan, Gruffudd managed to escape his captors and sought military aid in the Isles from certain king named "Gothrei", and endured numerous perils together. (Note: Historia Gruffud vab Kenan calls the Isles the "islands of Denmark", and describes the location of them and Ireland as "in the sea side by side with the island of Britain". This source's account of Gruffudd receiving aid from Gothrei may be corroborated by the Life of St Gwynllyw, a twelfth-century source which states that, at some point in his career, Gruffudd received refuge and military aid in Orkney,) In fact, Godred's reign in Dublin and the Isles at about this time suggests that he is identical to the Gothrei whom Gruffudd fled to. If Godred was indeed a descendant of Amlaíb Cúarán like Gruffudd, this shared ancestry could well explain the cooperation between the two. On the other hand, although Gothrei is described as Gruffudd's "friend" or "ally", no specific kinship is acclaimed by the source, which may indicate that Gruffudd's appeal was one of mere expediency. Whatever the case, having gained support from the Isles—in the form of an armed naval force of sixty ships—Historia Gruffud vab Kenan records that Gruffudd invaded Anglesey and defeated a force of Anglo-Normans, before the Islesmen returned home. Gruffudd and Gothrei appear to have directed their efforts against the Anglo-Norman castle of Aberlleiniog, before the former tackled other installations. A significant feature of the encroachment of English power into Gwynedd was the erection of a line of mottes along the northern Welsh coast. The strategic placement of these military sites suggests that they were constructed with the command of the sea in mind. As such, this fortified coastal network could have been perceived as a potential threat to Norse-Gaelic mercenarial operations and raiding expeditions in the region, and may partly explain Gothrei's cooperation with Gruffudd. (Note: It is also possible that the castles were seated along the coast in order to be easily supplied by sea. However, there is no evidence of any seaborne reinforcements when the Welsh successfully campaigned against them, and the record of prolific Norse-Gaelic military activity in the area suggests that the English were not dominating the waves.)

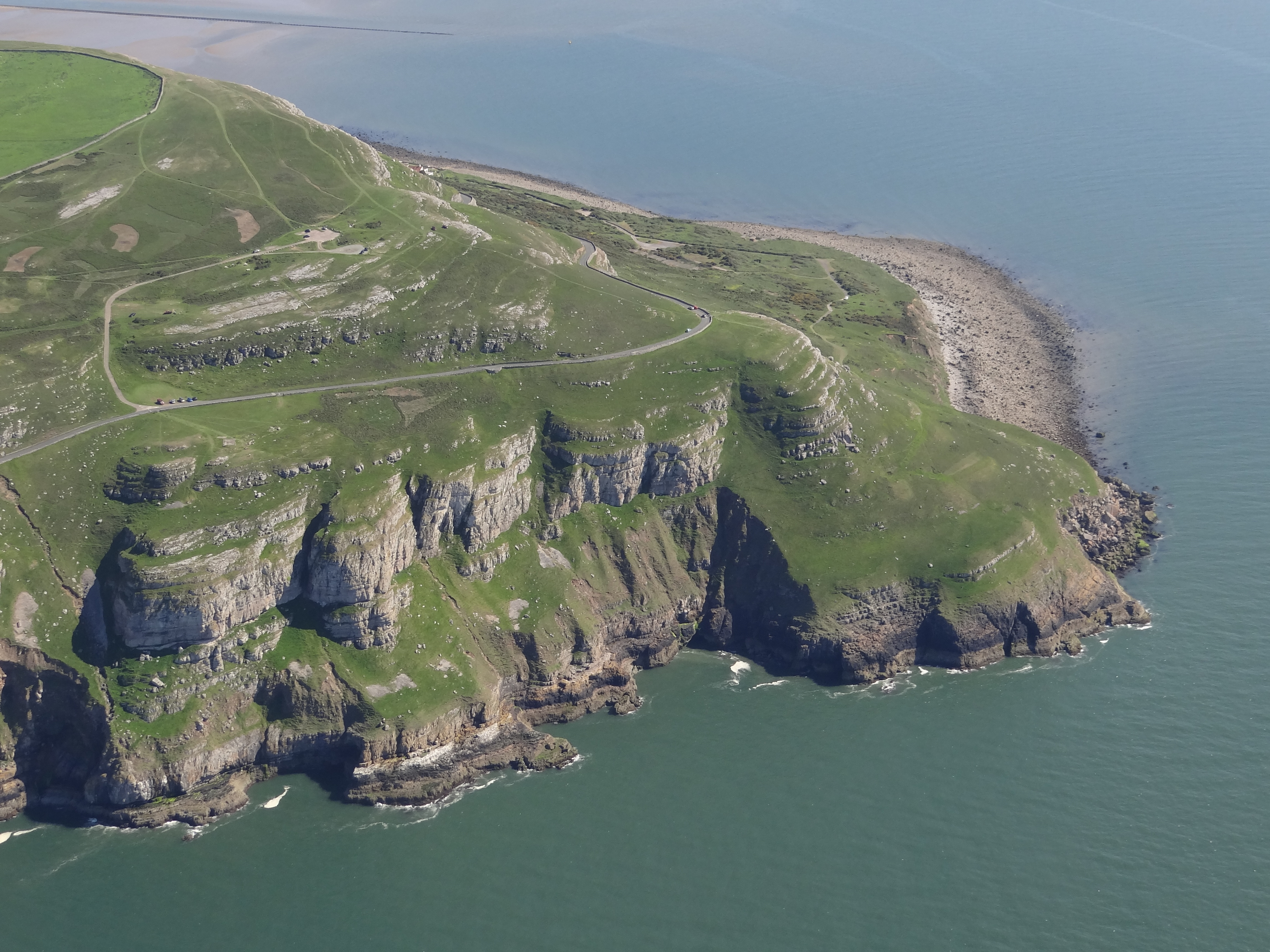
Great Orme, where Grithfridus is said to have made landfall before battling and killing Robert de Tilleul

In 1093, at about the time of this cooperation between Gruffudd and Gothrei, the twelfth-century Historia ecclesiastica records the death of Robert de Tilleul, an eminent Anglo-Norman based in Rhuddlan. According to this source, Robert was slain by a certain king named "Grithfridus". Although there is reason to suspect that the latter is identical to Gruffudd, this identification is by no means certain, as the less than impartial Historia Gruffud vab Kenan makes no mention of this episode at all. In fact, another possibility is that the sea-roving Grithfridus is identical to Gothrei, and thus Godred himself. Whatever the case, Historia ecclesiastica states that Robert was slain during a sea-borne predatory raid in which Grithfridus' three-ship force made landfall under the cliffs of Great Orme. The invaders are further said to have ravished the surrounding countryside, loading their ships with livestock and captives. Having crushed Robert's forces, Grithfridus is stated to have had the former's severed head bound as a trophy to the top of his mast. (Note: During the tenth-, eleventh- and twelfth centuries, Dublin was the heart of the slave trade between Britain and Ireland. According to the account of the sack of Aberlleiniog given by Historia Gruffud vab Kenan, a conflict in which Godred may have assisted Gruffudd, Gruffudd's plunder included French and English captives.)

Just as Godred's rise in the Irish Sea region appears to have provoked William II to protect the north-western reaches of his realm, the participation of the Islesmen in war-wracked northern Wales may have provoked a similar response. The activity of the Islesmen in the region, and the prospect of their consolidation on Anglesey, may well have posed a potential threat to English interests in the area. (Note: According to Historia Gruffud vab Kenan, the Norse-Gaelic father of Gruffudd's mother built and commanded a Welsh fortress called Castell Avloed. The site of this fortress is unknown for certain, although it may have been located at Moel-y-don.) Certainly, Historia Gruffud vab Kenan records that William II launched an utterly unsuccessfully campaign into the region, directed at Gruffudd himself, and that the English were forced to turn back without having gained any plunder. Nevertheless, an alternate possibility is that William II had been lured into the region by the native resurgence throughout the Welsh Marches—an event in which Gruffudd's participation is uncertain. Whatever the reason, the English counter-operation appears to have been undertaken with mainly defensive objectives in mind.

== Downfall and death ==
Late-eleventh-century cross-slab uncovered on Islay

Godred's rule in Dublin lasted until 1094. That year the Annals of Inisfallen reveal that warfare broke out between Muirchertach and a northern Irish alliance that included Godred. This source and the seventeenth-century Annals of Clonmacnoise, the Annals of the Four Masters, and the Annals of Ulster, reveal that Muirchertach marched upon Dublin where he was confronted by the alliance. Godred's maritime force in this campaign is numbered at ninety ships by the seventeenth-century Annals of the Four Masters. Although all these sources indicate that Muirchertach's forces were at first forced to flee, Muirchertach soon returned after the alliance had dispersed, and succeeded in driving Godred from Dublin. The Annals of Inisfallen appears to indicate that warfare between Muirchertach and Godred was wrought throughout the year. The source also reveals that, during Dublin's fall, Muirchertach captured Conchobar Ua Conchobair Failge, King of Uí Failge. Although the Kingdom of Uí Failge had previously enjoyed the patronage of the Uí Briain, it is possible that Godred had forged an alliance with Conchobar. Following the Uí Briain conquest of Dublin, the Ua Conchobair kings of Uí Failge may have been the only Leinster lords who refused to acknowledge Muirchertach's overlordship.

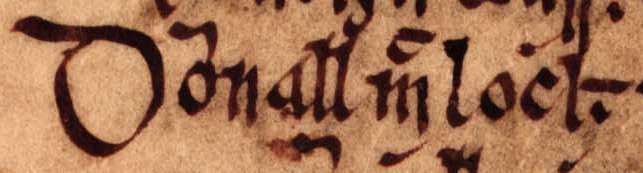
The name of Domnall Mac Lochlainn—Muirchertach's arch-rival and Godred's possible ally—as it appears on folio 19r of Oxford Bodleian Library Rawlinson B 488: "Domnall mac Lochlainn"

From a late-eleventh-century Irish perspective, dominance of Dublin appears to have been a virtual prerequisite of gaining the Irish high-kingship, and Muirchertach's quest for control of this coastal kingdom appears to have been undertaken in such a context. In fact, it is evidence that Godred had allied himself with Muirchertach's fiercest rival for the high-kingship, Domnall Mac Lochlainn, King of Cenél nEógain. It possible that this compact contributed to Godred's successes in Dublin. Just as Godred's seizure of Dublin appears to have taken place at a point when two superior powers were occupied elsewhere, his expulsion from the kingdom appears to have taken place at a time when Muirchertach's hands were free, having temporarily settled matters with his rival half-brother, Diarmait Ua Briain, and having earned some success in extending Uí Briain authority into Connacht.

Contemporary numismatic material concerning Dublin indicates that, starting in 1095, immediately following Godred's demise, the kingdom's coinage became drastically debased in terms of weight and stylistic quality. For about a generation previous, Dublin's coinage had imitated the near contemporary styles of the English and Anglo-Normans, albeit with varying consistency, but immediately after 1095 Dublin's coins dramatically degenerated into poor imitations of nearly century-old designs. This could be evidence that, in comparison to Muirchertach's immediate Norse-Gaelic predecessors in Dublin, his own regime lacked the expertise to ensure the vitality of the kingdom's commerce and currency. (Note: There appears to have been no Manx coinage between the late eleventh and early fourteenth centuries.)

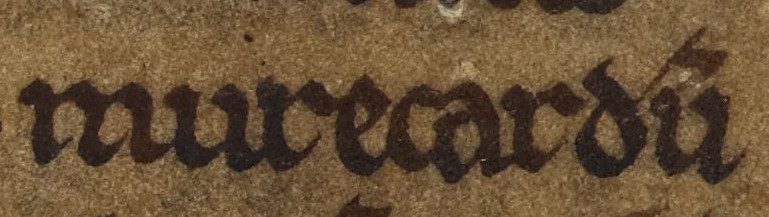
The name of Muirchertach Ua Briain as it appears on folio 33v of British Library Cotton Julius A VII: "Murecardum"

Annalistic evidence from throughout Europe indicates that the continent suffered from a resurgence of plague and famine during the first years of the 1090s. In fact, if the Annals of the Four Masters is to be believed, about a quarter of Ireland's population succumbed to pestilence in 1095. This source, and a host of others—such as the Annals of Clonmacnoise, the Annals of Inisfallen, the Annals of Tigernach, and the Annals of Ulster—all single out Godred as one of the many mortalities. The Chronicle of Mann, which also records Godred's death, reveals that he died on Islay. The fact that he met his end on that island could be evidence that Muirchertach not only drove him from Dublin, but from Mann as well. (Note: The chronicle's notice of Godred's death on Islay is the first documentary source to make mention of the island after the record of an earthquake there in 740.) On the other hand, the possibility that Islay was an important locus of royal power in the Isles, combined with the evidence of his father's links with the island could instead be evidence against such an overthrow. Furthermore, the chronicle itself states that Godred was succeeded by his eldest son, Lagmann.

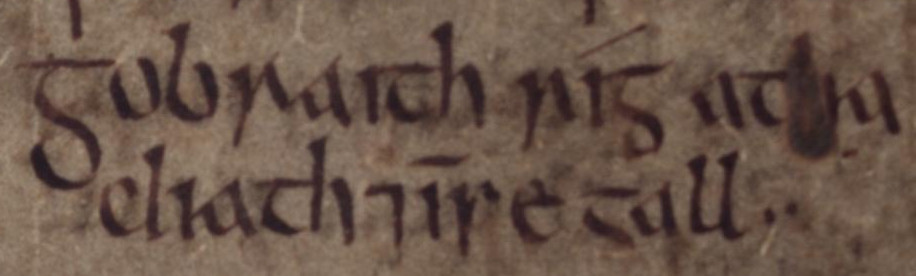
Godred's name and title as it appears on folio 30v of Oxford Bodleian Library Rawlinson B 503 (the Annals of Inisfallen): "Gobraith, ríg Atha Cliath & Inse Gall". This title, describing him as king of both Dublin and the Isles, is quite rare and may further evidence Godred's Irish connections.

On Godred's death, the Annals of Inisfallen accord him the title "ríg Atha Cliath & Inse Gall" (translated variously as "King of Dublin and of the Isles" and "king of Dublin and the Hebrides", a remarkable designation in the fact that it is quite rare, and perhaps only elsewhere accorded to Diarmait mac Maíl na mBó. In the case of the latter, the title may emphasise Diarmait's achievement of stretching his influence from Ireland into the Isles. In Godred's case, the title may instead underscore Godred's expansion into Ireland from the Isles. (Note: The title rí Atha Cliath ("king of Dublin") is uncommon in primary sources, and the men regarded by historians as kings of Dublin are more usually styled rí Gall ("king of the foreigners"). The earliest attestation of a king styled rí Atha Cliath occurs in the record of Gofraid mac Amlaíb meic Ragnaill's death in 1075.) The chronicle's record of Godred's death on Islay could indicate that the island formed a secondary power centre in the Isles. The fact that Historia Gruffud vab Kenan notes that Gruffudd travelled into the Isles to obtain military assistance from Gothrei could also be evidence that Godred's headquarters was located there. The record of Godred's death on Islay further suggests that he may well have been buried on the nearby holy island of Iona, the burial place of his like-named grandson, Gofraid mac Amlaíb, King of Dublin and the Isles.

== Legacy ==
=== Síol nGofraidh and the Crovan dynasty ===
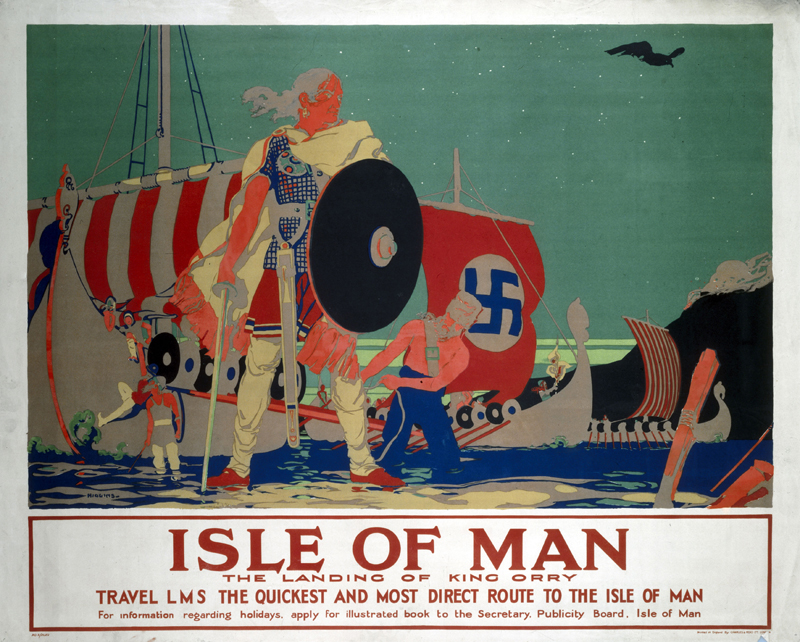
"The Landing of King Orry", an early-twentieth-century railway poster depicting the legendary King Orry

Godred's greatest impact on history may have been his foundation of the Crovan dynasty, a vigorous family of sea-kings that ruled in the Isles for almost two centuries, until its extinction in the mid-thirteenth century, when the remaining kingdom was annexed by Alexander III, King of Scotland. There is uncertainty concerning the political situation in the Isles in the last decade of the eleventh century. It is apparent, however, that the dynasty descended from him soon turned upon itself. Although Godred's eldest son, Lagmann, appears to have succeeded him during the decade, the latter was soon forced to fend off rivals' factions supporting Godred's younger sons, Aralt in particular. Irish power appears to have encroached into the Isles at about this time as well, and it is evident that the political upheaval and dynastic instability in the wake of Godred's demise eventually provoked Magnús Óláfsson, King of Norway to forcibly take control of the Isles before the century's end. (Note: In its account of the reign of Domnall mac Donnchada, King of Alba, the twelfth-century Prophecy of Berchán claims that Domnall left "Scotland to the gentiles" (or "Scotland to Vikings"). Although the meaning of this passage is uncertain, it is possible that it refers to Godred's consolidation of power in the Isles, or perhaps to Magnús' invasion after his death.) It was not until the about the second decade of the twelfth century that the Crovan dynasty re-established firm control, in the person of Amlaíb, Godred's youngest son.

In the mid-twelfth century, the Isles were partitioned between two rival power blocks. One faction, controlling Mann and the northern Hebrides, was led by the representative of the Crovan dynasty, Gofraid mac Amlaíb, Godred's grandson; the other faction, controlling the southern Hebrides, was ruled by Somairle mac Gilla Brigte, Lord of Argyll, husband of Ragnailt ingen Amlaíb, Godred's granddaughter. Somairle eventually forced his brother-in-law from power, and ruled the entire kingdom for almost a decade before the Crovan dynasty regained control of their permanently partitioned domain. (Note: This Ragnailt was a daughter of Godred's son Amlaíb, and should not be confused with the like-named mother of Gruffudd.) Although the dynasty expired in the mid-thirteenth century, Somairle's descendants—Clann Somairle—held power in the Hebrides for centuries to come. In fact, the later mediaeval Clann Somairle Lordship of the Isles, which survived into the late fifteenth century, was a direct successor of Godred's maritime imperium.

Image a

Image b

Forms of Gofraid mac Fergusa's name as they appear on folios 13r (image a) and 320v (image b) of the seventeenth-century Dublin Royal Irish Academy C iii 3 (the Annals of the Four Masters)

The Chronicle of Mann, Orkneyinga saga, and later tradition preserved in the eighteenth-century Book of Clanranald, reveal that it was through Ragnailt's descent that Clann Somairle, and Somairle himself, claimed kingship in the Isles. Godred's place at the royal apex of the two dynasties who contested the kingship of the Isles in the twelfth and thirteenth centuries suggests that he is identical to the like-named man proclaimed as an eminent ancestral figure in two thirteenth-century poems concerning Clann Somairle dynasts. The professed descendants of this Gofraid were poetically conceptualised as Síol nGofraidh ("the seed of Gofraid"), a Gaelic term that, conceivably, originally applied to both the Crovan dynasty and Clann Somairle. Later unease with a matrilineal descendant from Godred may have led to the invention of a patrilineal descent of Clann Somairle from a like-named man with enviable, albeit concocted, Scottish connections. Godred, therefore, may be identical to the anachronistic Gofraid mac Fergusa, an alleged ninth-century figure dubiously noted in the Annals of the Four Masters, and otherwise only specifically attested in later genealogical accounts concerning Clann Somairle. (Note: The annal-entries concerning Gofraid mac Fergusa are derived from entries concerning the historical Gofraid ua Ímair, King of Dublin and Northumbria. The former, unlike the latter, is portrayed as a Gaelic noble who aided the Scottish Crown.)

=== Memory in Manx and Hebridean tradition ===
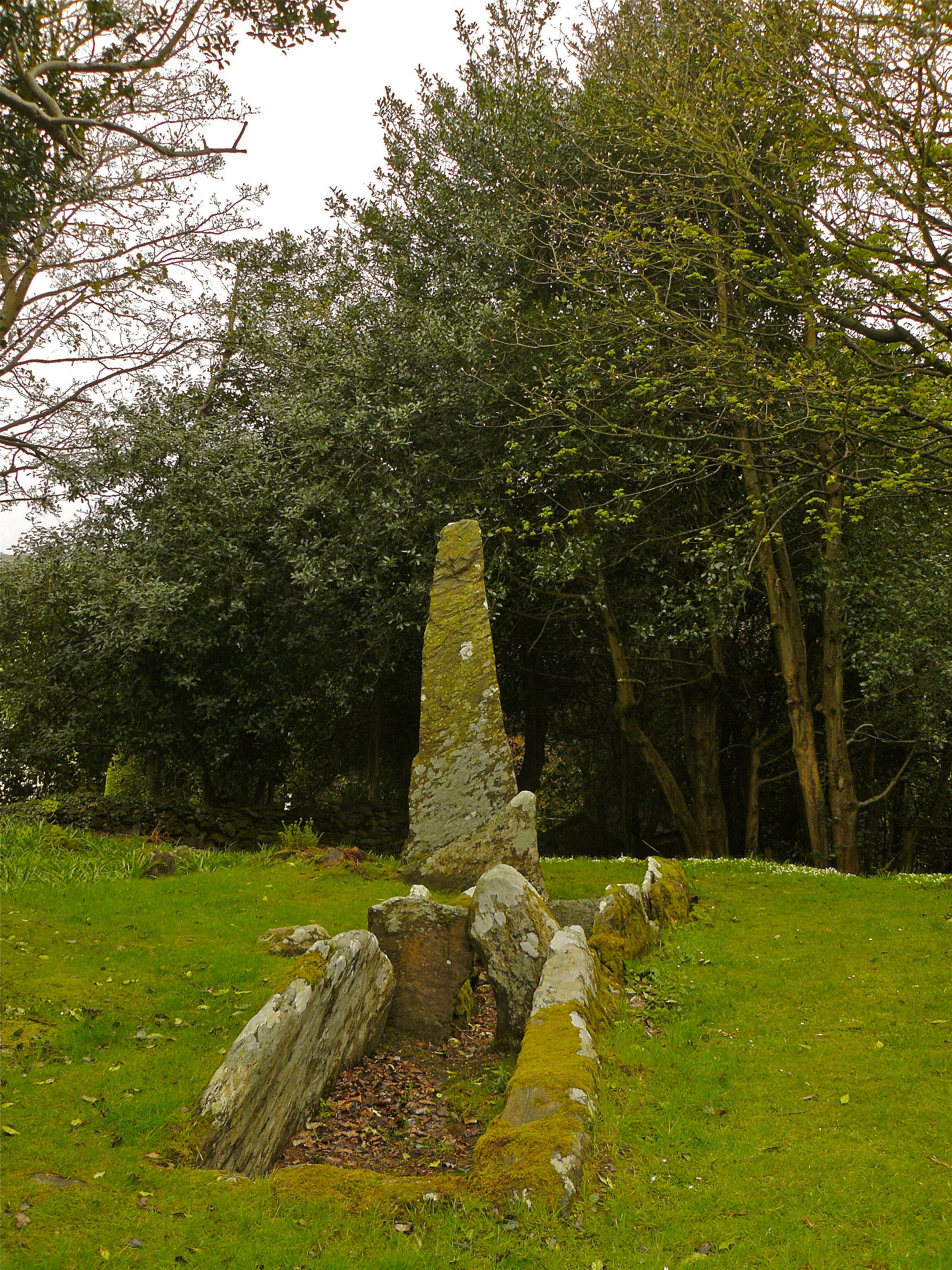
Image a

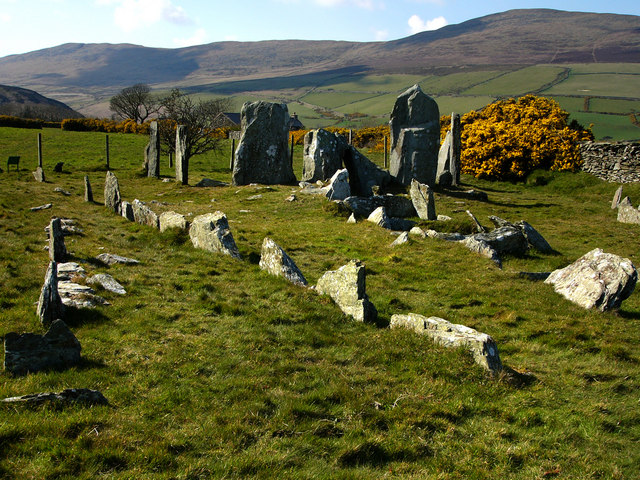
Image b

Prehistoric Manx sites linked to Godred in modern times: King Orry's Grave (image a) and Cashtel yn Ard (image b)

Godred's arrival on Mann is commonly taken as a starting point of Manx history. This elevated place in the island's historiography is partly due to his position as an apical ancestral figure of later kings, and by his preeminent position in the historical account of the Isles preserved by the Chronicle of Mann. In fact, this source appears to have been commissioned by Godred's later descendants as a means to legitimize their claims to the kingship, and the later historiographical emphasis that separates Godred from his predecessors may well be unwarranted. That being said, Godred is possibly the historical prototype of the celebrated King Orry (Manx Gaelic Ree Gorree and Ree Orree) of Manx folklore. (Note: The Manx Gaelic Gorree is a Gaelicisation of the Old Norse Guðrøðr. Another historical candidate for King Orry is Gofraid mac Arailt, King of the Isles.) This legendary figure appears in the earliest example of Manx literature, the so-called Manannan Ballad, an eighteenth-century text that appears to contain content of sixteenth-century provenance. This traditional account of Mann asserts that, following King Orry's arrival, and his subsequent introduction of the island's legal system, thirteen of his descendants ruled in turn as king before Alexander III's takeover. In fact, this tally appears to conform to the number of historical Manx rulers during the Crovan dynasty's floruit. King Orry, and thus Godred himself, is seemingly referred to in Manx legislation dating to the early fifteenth century, as the term "in King Orryes Days" was recorded at the 1422 sitting of Tynwald. This phrase likely equates to "time immemorial", a time beyond memory, once defined under English law as the time before the reign of the celebrated Richard I, King of England.

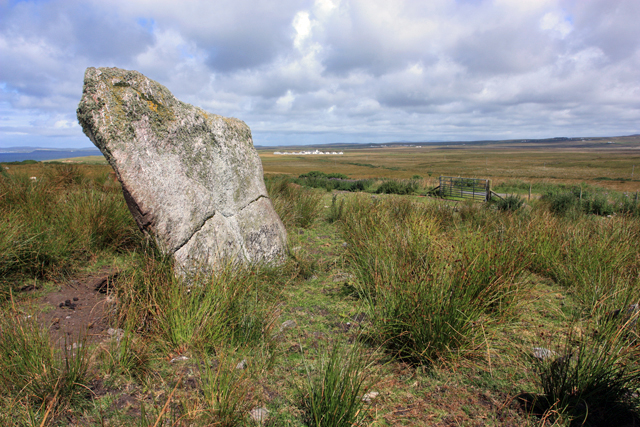
Carragh Bhàn, a prehistoric standing stone on Islay

According to local tradition on Islay, Godred's grave is marked by Carragh Bhàn (grid reference NR32834781), a standing stone situated near the settlement of Kintra, on the island's Oa peninsula. The site itself is likely prehistoric, although there is a legitimate late-eleventh-century cross-slab found on the island, near Port Ellen (grid reference NR357458), that appears to contain motifs from contemporary Scandinavian and Irish art. As with Godred on Islay, supposed burial places of King Orry are traditionally marked by prehistoric burial sites on Mann. One such site is the now-mutilated tomb, known as King Orry's Grave (grid reference SC440844), located near Laxey; another is Cashtal yn Ard (grid reference SC463893), also known as Cashtal Ree Gorree, located near Maughold. The so-called Godred Crovan Stone, a massive granite rock, once located in the Manx parish of Malew but destroyed in the nineteenth century, may have owed its name to eighteenth- or nineteenth-century romanticism.

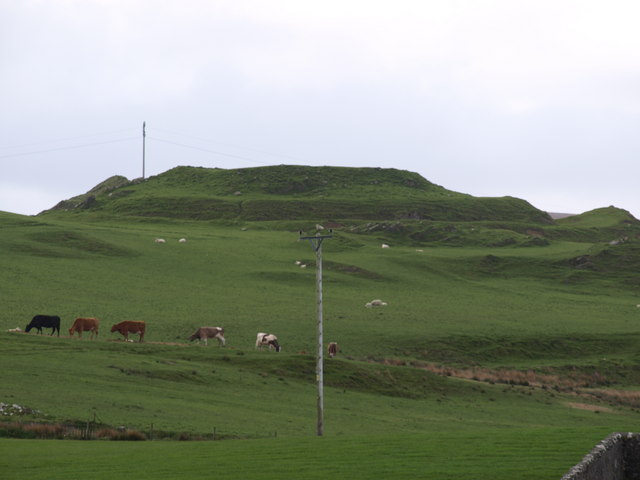
The area surrounding Dùn Ghùaidhre, a ruinous mediaeval fortress traditionally associated with Godred

The area surrounding Dùn Ghùaidhre (grid reference NR38926483), a ruinous mediaeval fortress on Islay, is traditionally associated with Godred, and overlooks some of the island's most fertile lands. The south-east ridge along Dùn Ghùaidhre is named in Gaelic Clac an Righ ("Ridge of the King"). According to local tradition, Godred slew a dragon at Emaraconart, a site only about 2 kilometres (1.2 mi) from the fortress and ridge. Although the present form of the fort's name appears to refer to Godred himself, it is unknown if there is any historical connection between him and the site. A nearby site is Àiridh Ghutharaidh. The etymology of this place name is uncertain. It could be derived from the Gaelic àirigh ("shieling") and *Gutharaidh (a hypothesised Gaelic form of the Old Norse personal name Guðrøðr). The fact that this site is only about 2 kilometres (1.2 mi) from Dùn Ghùaidhre could suggest that the names of both locations refer to Godred. On the other hand, it is possible that the names of the fort, ridge, and shieling are merely the result of folk etymology. Another Islay site associated with Godred is Conisby (grid reference NR262618). This place name is derived from the Old Norse *Konungsbýr ("king's farm"), a prestigious designation that appears to echo the district's not insignificant size and quality of lands. Whether the site was ever owned by a king is unknown, although local tradition certainly associates it with Godred himself.

Detail of a proposed mid-nineteenth-century Manx monument to King Orry

The eighteenth-century poet Thomas Chatterton composed Godred Crovan, a poem that appeared in print in 1769, under the full title Godred Crovan. A poem. Composed by Dopnal Syrric, Scheld of Godred Crovan, King of the Isle of Man, published in the Town and Country Magazine. The poem appears to have influenced the work of the contemporaneous poet William Blake, particularly Blake's first piece of revolutionary poetry, Gwin, King of Norway. Whilst Chatterton's composition tells the tale of an invasion of Mann by a tyrannous Norseman named Godred Crovan, Blake's ballad is about a tyrannous Norse king who is slain by a native giant named Gordred. Chatterton's compositions in Town and Country Magazine were strongly influenced by, and imitative of, the so-called Ossianic poetry of the contemporaneous poet James Macpherson. In fact, it was likely through Chatterton's work that Blake was most influenced by Macpherson. Unlike Macpherson, who deceptively insisted that his epic Ossianic corpus was translated from the work of an ancient Celtic bard, Chatterton did not claim his Ossianic inspired compositions were the remnants of ancient literature. (Note: That being said, Chatterton famously forged a corpus of so-called Rowleian poetry that he claimed was the work of a mediaeval monk named Thomas Rowley.)

In the wake of Macpherson's publications, several examples of Manx folksongs appear to have first come to light. One particular piece, a Manx Gaelic song called Fin as Oshin, is the only example of fíanaigecht existing in Manx musical tradition. (Note: The Gaelic term fíanaigecht refers to literature concerning the legendary Finn mac Cumaill, his fian, and family).) Surviving in several eighteenth-century manuscripts, Fin as Oshin tells a tale similar to other poems recounting the story of the burning of Finn's house. A central character in the song is a certain Gorree/Orree/Orree Beg, a hero who corresponds to Garadh/Garaidh in cognate tales. The spelling of this hero's name in Fin as Oshin suggests that he represents Godred himself, thereby giving the story a native slant. Godred's place in this song probably accounts for its survival in local memory. (Note: In this case, the epithet Beg appears to be a diminutive of affection, rather than a reference to a physical trait.) In Vindication of the Celtic Character, the nineteenth-century Gaelic poet William Livingstone offered imaginative accounts of Viking incursions on Islay. One such tale, alleged by Livingstone to have been "handed down from the Danish mythologists of those days", concerns exploits of Godred in the island's Loch Indaal vicinity. Livingstone's versions of such local traditions appear to be the inspiration behind his epic Gaelic battle-poem Na Lochlannaich an Ile ("The Norsemen in Islay"). The Gaelic folk song Birlinn Ghoraidh Chróbhain, sometimes called Birlinn Ghoraidh Chrobhain and Godred Crovan's Galley, was composed by Duncan Johnston, and released in part one of his 1938 book Cronan nan Tonn. Johnston's song describes the journey of Godred's royal birlinn from Mann to Islay, and commemorates the sea-power of the Crovan dynasty.

Due to Godred's place in Manx history, he is given a role in the fictional history of The Island of Sodor in The Railway Series by Wilbert Awdry (the name Sodor itself being a reference to the title of Bishop of Sodor and Man). The station of Crovan's Gate as depicted in the books and the TV adaption Thomas & Friends is the junction of the North Western Railway and the narrow gauge Skarloey Railway, and in Awdry's writing was the site of a battle between Godred Crovan and the Norman army.
