= Battle of Skyhill =

Battle at Ramsey, Isle of Man in 1079

Coordinates: 54.319°N 4.408°W

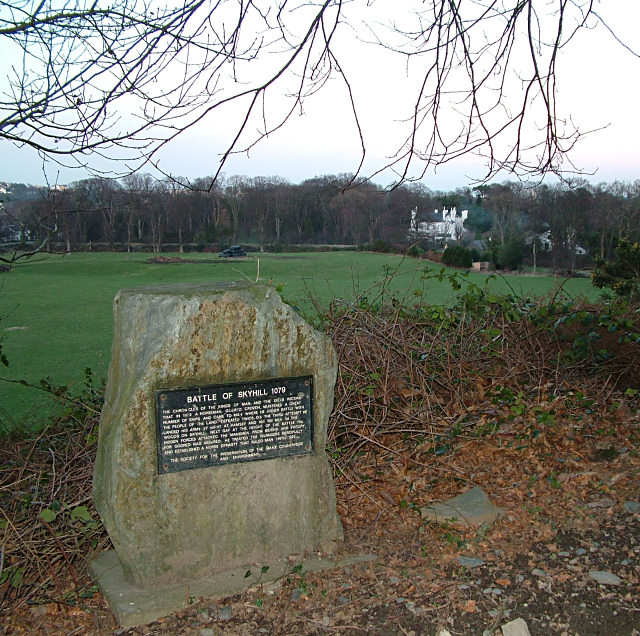
- A stone on the battleground commemorating the conflict
Date	1079
Location	Sky Hill, Ramsey, Isle of Man
Result	Annexation of the island, formation of the Kingdom of Mann and the Isles

Belligerents
Forces of Godred Crovan	The Manx led by Fingal Godredson

Commanders and leaders
Godred Crovan	Fingal Godredson

Strength
300+	?

Casualties and losses
?	?

The Battle of Scacafell or Skyhill took place about one mile (1.5 km) west of Ramsey, Isle of Man in 1079. This was during the third and final time that the Norse-Gael warrior Godred Crovan had invaded the island, finally taking it from the ruling king Fingal Godredson.

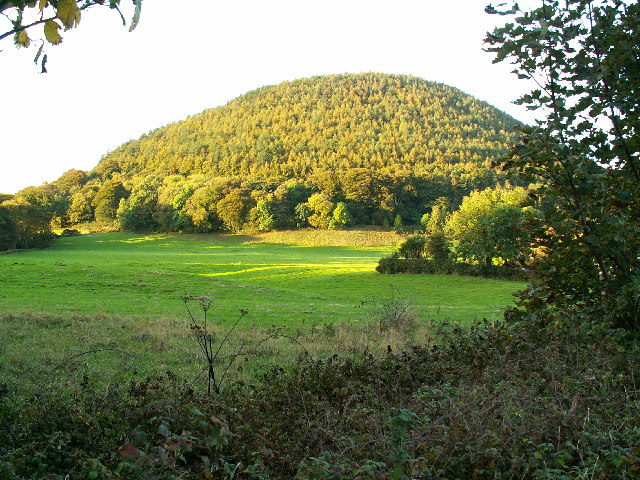
Scacafell

At the time of the battle, the Isle of Man was part of a larger political entity called the Kingdom of the Sudreys, which consisted of Mann and the Hebrides. According to the Chronicles of Mann Godred Crovan's father was "Harald the Black of Ysland" about whom nothing more is known. Other sources suggest he may have been a brother or son of Ivar Haraldsson who died in 1054.

In 1070 King Godred Sitricson died and his throne was passed to Fingal, but he does not seem to have remained there long. In 1079, Godred Crovan assembled a fleet and an army, probably of Norsemen from the Hebrides, and attacked the island. He was repulsed, but was soon back for a second attempt. Again he was repulsed, but later in the same year Godred Crovan came back a third time, and the chronicles are reasonably clear as to what happened next:

A third time he gathered a massive force and came by night to the harbour which is called Ramsey, and three hundred men he hid in a wood which was on the sloping brow of the mountain called Sky Hill. At dawn the Manxmen formed up in battle order and after a massive charge joined battle with Godred. When the battle was raging vehemently, the three hundred rose from their place of hiding at their rear and began to weaken the resistance of the Manxmen and compelled them to flee. Now when they saw themselves defeated without any place for them to escape to, for the tide had filled the riverbed at Ramsey and the enemy were pressing constantly from the other side, those that were left begged Godred with pitiful cries to spare them their lives. Moved with compassion and taking pity on their plight, since he had been reared among them for some time, he called off his army and forbade them to pursue them further.

— Chronica Regum Manniae et Insularum (The Chronicles of the Kings of Man and the Isles)

It has been suggested that Fingal died at this battle, as he disappears from the record from this time, but the otherwise detailed account neglects to mention this.

The result of the battle was that the Manx submitted to Godred’s rule and a sanctioned plundering of the island was carried out by his men. The island was then divided between the north, for rule by the Manx, and the South, for rule by those from the Hebrides whom Godred had brought with him to the battle. Despite Godred then moving on to a conquest of Dublin before returning to the Hebrides, he retained rule of the island until his death in 1095. His descendants continued to rule the island for the next 74 years, until 1153. Again, this is clear in the chronicales:

“Next day Godred gave his army the option of having the country divided amongst them if they preferred to remain and inhabit it, or of taking everything it contained worth having, and returning to their homes. The soldiers preferred plundering the whole island, and returning home enriched by its wealth. Godred then granted to the few islanders who had remained with him, the southern part of the island, and to the surviving Manxmnen the northern portion, on condition that none of them should ever presume to claim any of the land by hereditary right.”

— Chronica Regum Manniae et Insularum (The Chronicles of the Kings of Man and the Isles)
