= Dun Guaidhre =

Iron Age fort in Islay, Scotland

Coordinates: 55.8067°N 6.1707°W

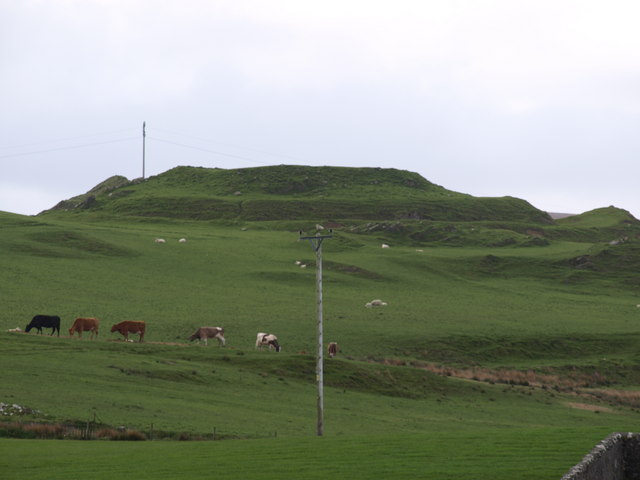
Dun Guaidhre

Dun Guaidhre, also known as Dùn Ghùaidhre, is an Iron Age fort southwest of Kilmeny, Islay, Scotland. It is protected as a scheduled monument.

Local tradition associates the fort with Godred Crovan.
