= Gwenllian ferch Gruffudd =

Welsh noblewoman (died 1136)

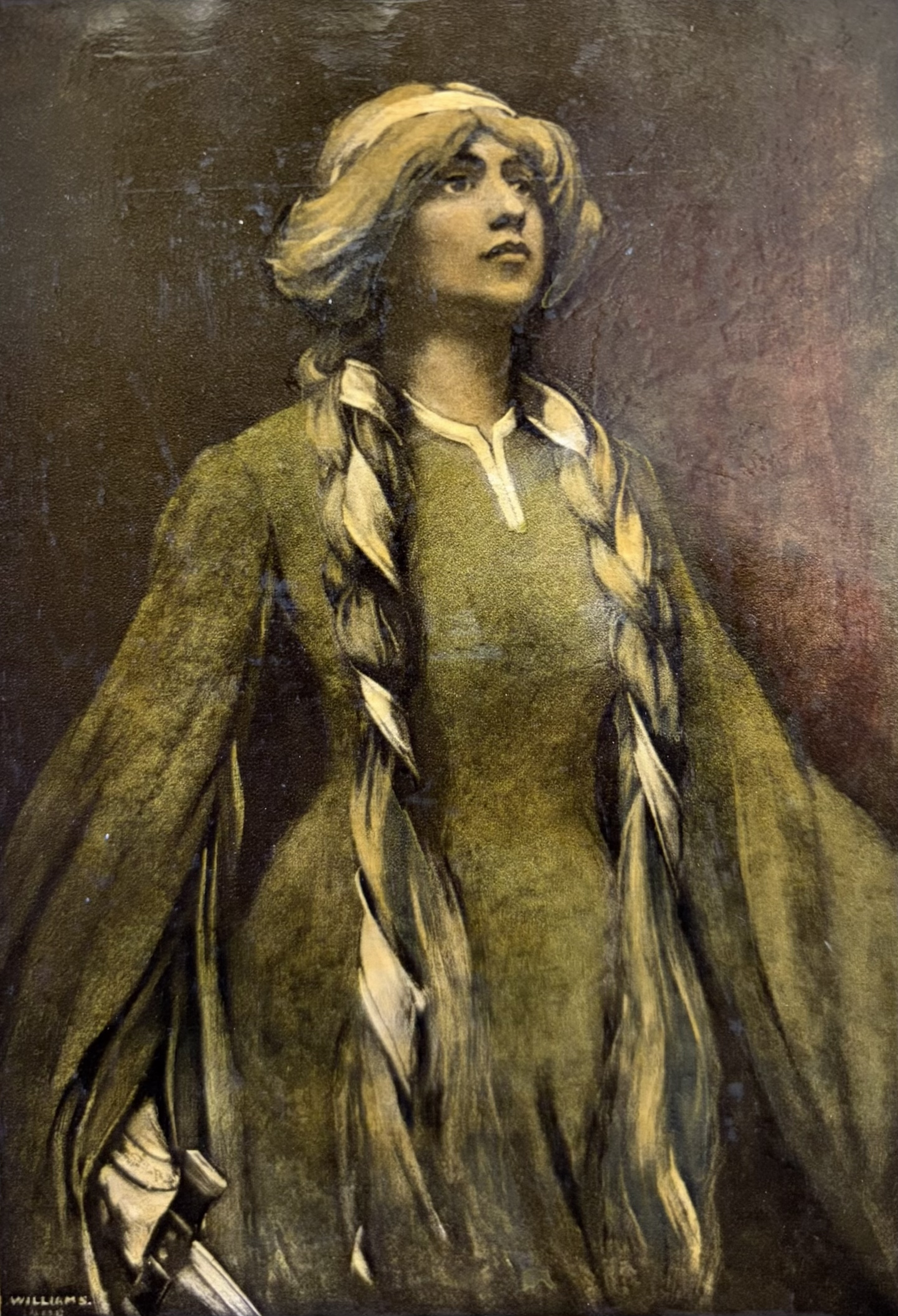
- Imaginary portrait of Gwenllian by Hugh Williams, 1909
- Died: 1136; Maes Gwenllian, Eginog, Wales; 51.7545967°N 4.283018°W
- Spouse: Gruffudd ap Rhys
- Issue: Gwladus ferch Gruffudd; Maredudd ap Gruffudd; Rhys ap Gruffudd
- Dynasty: Second Dynasty of Gwynedd
- Father: Gruffudd ap Cynan
- Mother: Angharad ferch Owain

Gwenllian ferch Gruffudd (Note: Welsh pronunciation: [ɡwɛnˈɬiːan vɛrχ ˈɡrɨ̞fɨ̞ð]) (died 1136) was a 12th-century Welsh noblewoman. The daughter of Gruffudd ap Cynan, who reestablished the rule of Second Dynasty of Gwynedd over the Kingdom of Gwynedd, she would eventually be married to Gruffudd ap Rhys of the Dynasty of Deheubarth, the ruler of what remained of that southern kingdom. Gwenllian was the mother of all the children of Gruffudd ap Rhys, including Rhys ap Gruffudd. She is remembered for leading a battle against the Normans near Kidwelly in 1136.

Gwenllian is remembered for her actions in 1136. Following the Norman conquest of England in 1066, the Normans engaged in campaigns in Wales, and for decades the native Welsh princes and the Normans were engaged in sporadic warfare over land in the country. Gwenllian's own father had been gaoled by Hugh d'Avranches in Chester for over a decade, while the family of her in-laws recovered lands in Deheubarth from the Normans only two decades prior. At the beginning of the twelfth century, Norman power was at a height not seen in Wales until the terms of the treaty ending the war of Edward I in Wales of 1277. In 1135, Henry I of England died, beginning the period known as the Anarchy, when partisans of Henry's successor Stephen of Blois battled those of the Empress Matilda, who drew her support from many Norman lords of Wales. Many spontaneous outbursts of Welsh resistance to Norman rule arose in this vacuum, with Gwenllian's actions among them.

The sole record of Gwenllian's actions is found in the Itinerarium Cambriae of her cousin Gerald of Wales, who recounts that when Gwenllian's husband rode north to seek aid from her father to attack Norman strongholds in south-west Wales, Gwenllian and two of her sons raised an army and attacked Kidwelly Castle. She was defeated by the castle's Norman defenders, and was beheaded. The place of this battle is remembered today as Maes Gwenllian, 'Gwenllian's Field'.

== Ancestry ==
Ancestors of Gwenllian ferch Gruffudd

16. Idwal ap Meurig
8. Iago ab Idwal
4. Cynan ab Iago
18. Gwair ap Pill
9. Afandreg ferch Gwair
2. Gruffudd ap Cynan
20. Sigtrygg Silkbeard
10. Olaf Sigtryggson
21. Sláine ingen Briain
5. Ragnhildr Óláfsdottir
1. Gwenllian ferch Gruffudd
24. Goronwy ab Einion
12. Edwin of Tegeingl
6. Owain ab Edwin
26. Cynfyn ap Gwerystan
13. Iwerydd ferch Cynfyn
27. Angharad ferch Maredudd
3. Angharad ferch Owain
28. Neiniad ap Gwaithfoed
14. Ednywain Bendew
7. Morwyl ferch Ednywain Bendew

== Sources ==
=== Primary sources ===
- Bartrum, P. C., ed. (1976). Welsh Genealogies: AD 300-1400. Cardiff: University of Wales Press. doi:10.20391/40837b6f-1887-4afd-9c6e-9b7e3a122693. ISBN 070830561X. Archived from the original on 6 June 2023.
- Dimock, James F., ed. (1868). Giraldi Cambrensis Opera (in Latin). Vol. VI. London: Longmans, Green, Reader, and Dyer. IA giraldicambrensi06gira.
- Thorpe, Lewis, ed. (1978). Gerald of Wales: The Journey through Wales and The Description of Wales. Translated by Thorpe, Lewis. London: Penguin Books. ISBN 0140443398. IA journeythroughwa00gira.

=== Secondary sources ===
- Davies, R. R. (1991) [1987]. The Age of Conquest: Wales 1063–1415. Oxford: Oxford University Press. ISBN 0198201982. IA ageofconquestwal0000davi.
- Lloyd, J. E. (1912). A History of Wales: from the earliest times to the Edwardian conquest. Vol. 2. London: Longmans, Green & Co. IA historyofwalesfr02lloyuoft.
- Pierce, T. Jones (1959). "GWENLLIAN (died 1136)". Dictionary of Welsh Biography. Aberystwyth: National Library of Wales.
- RCAHMW (2005). "Maes Gwenllian, site of Battle, Mynyddygarreg". Coflein. Aberystwyth: RCAHMW.
