= Cynan ab Iago =

- Prince of Gwynedd
- Born: c. 1014
- Died: c. 1063 (age 48-49)
- Spouse: Ragnhild of Dublin
- Issue: Gruffudd ap Cynan
- House: Second Dynasty of Gwynedd
- Father: Iago ab Idwal ap Meurig

Cynan ab Iago (c. 1014 – c. 1063) was a Welsh prince of the House of Aberffraw. His father, Iago ab Idwal ap Meurig, became King of Gwynedd in 1023, and his son, Gruffudd, later became king.

Iago was King of Gwynedd from 1023 to 1039 but was killed (possibly by his own men) while Cynan was still young. The throne was seized by Gruffydd ap Llywelyn, a member of a cadet branch of the royal dynasty. Cynan fled to Ireland and took refuge in the Kingdom of Dublin. He married Ragnhild (Old Norse: Ragnhildr), (Note: Also named as Irish: Ragnailt or Middle Welsh: Ragnell) the daughter of Olaf Arneid (lit. 'Olaf the Blind'; a.k.a. Olaf Sigtryggsson and Amlaíb mac Sitriuc) and the granddaughter of King Sigtrygg Silkbeard.

His wife was descended from Brian Boru through her father's mother Sláine ingen Briain and his wife's mother was the daughter of a son of King of Leinster Túathal mac Úgaire. The spelling Ragnailt appears on the list of fair women known as Bansenchas recorded in the Book of Leinster and elsewhere.

It can be inferred that he died soon after the birth of his son Gruffudd, as the 12th century work written in Middle Welsh titled "Historia hen Gruffud vab Kenan vab Yago" (lit. 'Ancient History of Gruffudd ap Cynan ap Iago') details Cynan's ancestry but omits him from its account of Gruffudd's youth. Instead, Gruffudd's mother tells him about his father and the patrimony he should claim across the sea. Following two major Saxon invasions under Harold and Tostig Godwinson, Gruffydd ap Llywelyn was killed in 1063: the later Welsh Brut y Tywysogion reported he was done in by his own men, while the Ulster Chronicle states he was killed by Cynan ab Iago in 1064.

The only record referring to Cynan as King of Gwynedd is the Historia hen Gruffud vab Kenan vab Yago. It is believed that the Historia was written from an earlier Latin manuscript written after the death of Gruffudd ap Cynan and during the early reign of Owain Gwynedd. It was first published as Buchedd neu Hanes Gruffud ap Kenan (lit. 'The Life and History of Gruffudd ap Cynan') in The Myvyrian Archaiology of Wales in the 19th century. Gruffudd, his son, was unusually referred to as grandson of Iago rather than the son of Cynan, which suggests Cynan was not well known.

== Children ==
- Gruffudd

== Bibliography ==
- Jones, Owen; Williams, Edward; Owen Pughe, William, eds. (1870). "Buchadd neu Hanes Gruffudd ap Kenan". The Myvyrian Archaiology of Wales: Collected Out of Ancient Manuscripts. Denbigh: Thomas Gee. pp. 721–734.
- Lloyd, John Edward (1901). "Wales and the Coming of the Normans". The Transactions of the Honourable Society of Cymmrodorion. Session 1899–1900. London: The Honourable Society of Commrodorion. pp. 122–179.
- Jones, Arthur (1910). The History of Gruffydd ap Cynan; The Welsh Text. IX. Manchester: Victoria University of Manchester.
- Lloyd, John Edward (1911). A History of Wales from the Earliest Times to the Edwardian Conquest. Vol. 1. Longmans, Green, and Company.
- Slover, Clark Harris (1926). "Early Literary Channels Between Britain and Ireland". University of Texas Bulletin. Austin, Texas: University of Texas. pp. 5–52 – via Google Books.
- Ó Cuív, Brian, ed. (1962). Proceedings of the International Congress of Celtic Studies: Held in Dublin, 6-10 July 1959. Dublin Institute for Advanced Studies – via Google Books.
- Bartrum, Peter C., ed. (1966). Early Welsh Genealogical Tracts. University of Wales Press.
- Jones, Francis (1969a). God Bless the Prince of Wales. Carmarthenshire Community Council (Local History Committee) – via Google Books.
- Jones, Francis (1969b). The Princes and Principality of Wales. University of Wales Press – via Google Books.
- Wynn, Sir John (1990). Jones, J. Gwynfor (ed.). The History of the Gwydir Family, and Memoirs. Gomer Press – via Google Books.
- Evans, Daniel Simon (1990). A Mediaeval prince of Wales: The life of Gruffudd ap Cynan. Felinfach, Lampeter: Llanerch Press.
- Hudson, Benjamin T. (2005). Viking Pirates and Christian Princes: Dynasty, Religion, and Empire in the North Atlantic. United States: Oxford University Press. ISBN 978-0-19-516237-0.
