= Gruffudd ap Cynan =

King of Gwynedd from 1081 to 1137

- King of Gwynedd
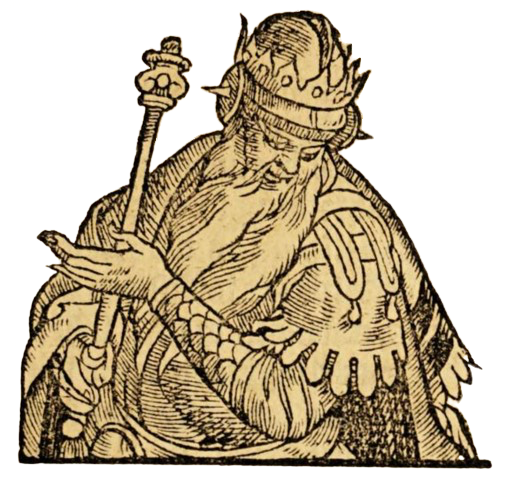
- A fanciful illustration of Gruffudd ap Cynan from the Historie of Cambria (1584)

King of Gwynedd
- Reign: 1081–1137
- Predecessor: Trahaearn ap Caradog
- Successor: Owain Gwynedd
- Born: c. 1055; Dublin, Ireland
- Died: 1137 (aged 81–82); Gwynedd, Wales
- Burial: Bangor Cathedral
- Spouse: Angharad ferch Owain
- Issue: Cadwallon, Owain, Cadwaladr, Susanna, Gwenllian, Mareda, Ranulht, Agnes
- House: Second Dynasty of Gwynedd
- Father: Cynan ab Iago
- Mother: Ragnailt ingen Amlaíb

Gruffudd ap Cynan (c. 1055–1137) was King of Gwynedd from 1081 until his death in 1137. In the course of a long and eventful life, he became a key figure in Welsh resistance to Norman rule.

As a descendant of Rhodri Mawr (Rhodri the Great), Gruffudd ap Cynan was a senior member of the princely House of Aberffraw. Through his mother, Gruffudd had close family connections with the Norse settlement around Dublin and he frequently used Ireland as a refuge and as a source of troops. He three times gained the throne of Gwynedd and then lost it again, before regaining it once more in 1099 and this time keeping power until his death. Gruffudd laid the foundations which were built upon by his son Owain Gwynedd and his great-grandson Llywelyn ab Iorwerth (Llywelyn the Great).

== Life ==
Unusual for a Welsh king or prince, a near-contemporary biography of Gruffudd, The History of Gruffudd ap Cynan, has survived. Much of our knowledge of Gruffudd comes from this source. The traditional view among scholars was that it was written during the third quarter of the 12th century during the reign of Gruffudd's son, Owain Gwynedd, but it has recently been suggested that it may date from the early reign of Llywelyn the Great, around 1200. The author is not known.

Most of the existing manuscripts of the history are in Welsh but these are clearly translations of a Latin original. It is usually considered that the original Latin version has been lost and that existing Latin versions are re-translations from the Welsh. However, Russell (2006) has suggested that the Latin version in Peniarth MS 434E incorporates the original Latin version, later amended to bring it into line with the Welsh text.

=== Ancestry ===
According to the Life of Gruffudd ap Cynan, Gruffudd was born in the Hiberno–Norse Kingdom of Dublin and reared near Swords, County Dublin, in Ireland. He was the son of an exiled Welsh King as per the Life, Cynan ap Iago, who was a claimant to the kingship of Gwynedd but was probably never its king in actuality, though his father, Gruffudd's grandfather, Iago ab Idwal ap Meurig, had ruled Gwynedd from 1023 to 1039. When Gruffudd first appeared on the scene in Wales the Welsh annals several times refer to him as "grandson of Iago" rather than the more usual "son of Cynan", indicating that his father was little known in Wales. Cynan ap Iago seems to have died while Gruffudd was still young, since the History describes his mother telling him who his father was.

According to Historia Gruffud vab Kenan, Gruffudd's mother was Ragnailt ingen Amlaíb, a granddaughter of King Sigtrygg Silkbeard and a member of the Hiberno-Norse Uí Ímair dynasty. The latter had two sons named Amlaíb: one died in 1013, whilst another died in 1034. Either man could have been Ragnailt's father. An anecdote described here about Ragnailt ingen Amlaíb explained a prophecy in which an unnamed monk told her that great power would come to her son. However, this has been rejected by modern scholars as an embellishment by later writers.

During his many struggles to gain the kingship of Gwynedd, Gruffudd received considerable aid from Ireland, from the Hiberno-Norse at Dublin, the Isles and Wexford and from Muircheartach Ua Briain, because he was also descendant through his mother from Brian Boru, High King of Ireland. (Note: Anonymous, The History of Gruffydd Ap Cynan, trans. and ed. by Arthur Jones, Manchester University Press, Manchester, 1910)

=== First bid for the throne ===
Gruffudd first attempted to take over the rule of Gwynedd in 1075, following the death of Bleddyn ap Cynfyn. Trahaearn ap Caradog had seized control of Gwynedd but had not yet firmly established himself. Gruffudd landed on Abermenai Point, Anglesey with an Irish force, and with the assistance of troops provided by the Norman Robert of Rhuddlan first defeated and killed Cynwrig ap Rhiwallon, an ally of Trahaearn who held Llŷn, then defeated Trahaearn himself in the Battle of Gwaed Erw in Meirionnydd and gained control of Gwynedd. Gruffudd then led his forces eastwards to reclaim territories taken over by the Normans, and despite the assistance previously given by Robert of Rhuddlan attacked and destroyed Rhuddlan Castle. However tension between Gruffudd's Danish-Irish bodyguard and the local Welsh led to a rebellion in Llŷn, and Trahaearn took the opportunity to counterattack, defeating Gruffudd at the Battle of Bron yr Erw above Clynnog Fawr the same year.

=== Second bid for the throne and capture by the Normans ===
Coat of Arms retroactively attributed to Gruffudd ap Cynan

Gruffudd fled to Ireland but, in 1081, returned and made an alliance with Rhys ap Tewdwr, prince of Deheubarth. Rhys had been attacked by Caradog ap Gruffudd of Gwent and Morgannwg, and had been forced to flee to St Davids Cathedral. Gruffudd this time embarked from Waterford with a force composed of Danes and Irish and landed near St Davids, presumably by prior arrangement with Rhys. He was joined here by a force of his supporters from Gwynedd, and he and Rhys marched north to seek Trahaearn ap Caradog and Caradog ap Gruffudd who had themselves made an alliance and been joined by Meilyr ap Rhiwallon of Powys. The armies of the two confederacies met at the Battle of Mynydd Carn, with Gruffudd and Rhys victorious and Trahaearn, Caradog and Meilyr all being killed. Gruffudd was thus able to seize power in Gwynedd for the second time.

He was soon faced with a new enemy, as the Normans were now encroaching on Gwynedd. Gruffudd had not been king very long when he was enticed to a meeting with Hugh d'Avranches, Earl of Chester and Hugh of Montgomery, 2nd Earl of Shrewsbury at Rhug, near Corwen. At the meeting, Gruffudd was seized and taken prisoner. According to his biographer, this was by the treachery of one of his own men, Meirion Goch. Gruffudd was imprisoned in Earl Hugh's castle at Chester for many years while Earl Hugh and Robert of Rhuddlan went on to take possession of Gwynedd, building castles at Bangor, Caernarfon and Aberlleiniog.

=== Escape from captivity and third reign ===
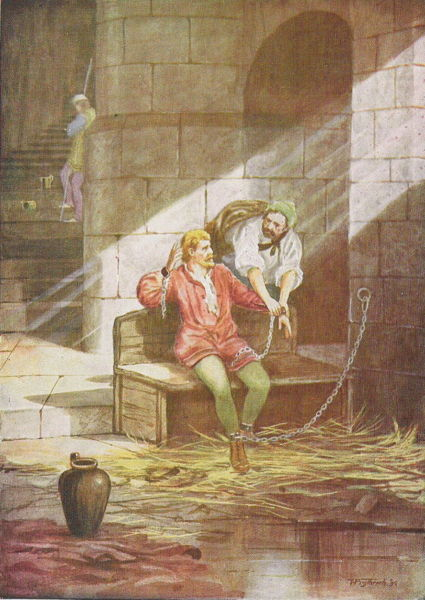
Gruffudd ap Cynan escapes from Chester; Illustration by T. Prytherch, 1900

Gruffudd reappeared on the scene years later, having escaped from captivity, he was free by 1094. (Note: According to his biography he was in fetters in the marketplace at Chester when Cynwrig the Tall, on a visit to the city, saw his opportunity when the burgesses were at dinner. He picked Gruffudd up, fetters and all, and carried him out of the city on his shoulders. There is debate among historians as to the year of Gruffudd's escape. Ordericus Vitalis mentions a "Grifridus" attacking the Normans in 1088. The History in one place states that Gruffudd was imprisoned for twelve years, in another that he was imprisoned for sixteen years. Since he was captured in 1081, that would date his release to 1093 or 1097. John Edward Lloyd favours 1093, considering that Gruffudd was involved at the beginning of the Welsh uprising in 1094. K. L. Maund on the other hand favours 1097, pointing out that there is no reference to Gruffudd in the contemporary annals until 1098. D. Simon Evans inclines to the view that Ordericus Vitalis' date of 1088 could be correct, suggesting that an argument based on the silence of the annals is unsafe.) Gruffudd again took refuge in Ireland but returned to Gwynedd to lead the assaults on Norman castles such as Castell Aberlleiniog. The Welsh revolt had begun in 1094 and by late 1095 had spread to many parts of Wales. This induced William II of England (William Rufus) to intervene, invading North Wales in 1095. However, his army was unable to bring the Welsh to battle and returned to Chester without having achieved very much. King William mounted a second invasion in 1097, but again without much success. The History only mentions one invasion by Rufus, which could indicate that Gruffudd did not feature in the resistance to the first invasion. At this time Cadwgan ap Bleddyn of Powys led the Welsh resistance.

In the summer of 1098, Earl Hugh of Chester joined with Earl Hugh of Shrewsbury in another attempt to recover his losses in Gwynedd. Gruffudd and his ally Cadwgan ap Bleddyn retreated to Anglesey, but were then forced to flee to Ireland in a skiff when a fleet he had hired from the Danish settlement in Ireland accepted a better offer from the Normans and changed sides.

=== King for the fourth time and consolidation ===
The Normans were obliged to evacuate Anglesey, and the following year, Gruffudd returned from Ireland to take possession again, having apparently come to an agreement with Earl Hugh of Chester. The situation was changed by the arrival of a Norwegian fleet under the command of King Magnus Barefoot (Magnus III of Norway) who attacked the Norman forces near the eastern end of the Menai Strait. Earl Hugh of Shrewsbury was killed by an arrow said to have been shot by Magnus himself.

With the death of Hugh of Chester in 1101, Gruffudd was able to consolidate his position in Gwynedd, as much by diplomacy as by force. He met King Henry I of England who granted him the rule of Llŷn, Eifionydd, Ardudwy and Arllechwedd, considerably extending his kingdom. By 1114, he had gained enough power to induce King Henry to invade Gwynedd, one detachment led by King Alexander I of Scotland. Faced with overwhelming force, Gruffudd was obliged to pay homage to Henry and to pay a heavy fine but lost no territory.

The Kingdom was expanded by his sons, (Note: By about 1118, advancing years meant that most of the fighting, which pushed Gwynedd's borders eastward and southwards, was done by his three sons by his wife Angharad daughter of Owain ab Edwin of Tegeingl) Owain Gwynedd and later Cadwaladr, by Gruffudd's last years "Ceredigion, Meirionnydd, Rhos, Rhufoniog and Dyffryn Clwyd were under the rule of Gwynedd". The cantrefs of Rhos and Rhufoniog were annexed in 1118, Meirionnydd captured from Powys in 1123, and Dyffryn Clwyd in 1124. Another invasion by King Henry I in 1121 ultimately ended in military failure. The king had to come to terms with Gruffudd and made no further attempt to invade Gwynedd during Gruffudd's reign. The death of Cadwallon in a battle against the forces of Powys near Llangollen in 1132 checked further expansion for the time being.

Gruffudd was now powerful enough to ensure that his nominee David the Scot was consecrated as Bishop of Bangor in 1120. The see had been effectively vacant since bishop Hervey le Breton had been forced to flee by the Welsh almost twenty years before, since Gruffudd and King Henry could not agree on a candidate. David went on to rebuild Bangor Cathedral with a large financial contribution from Gruffudd.

Owain and Cadwaladr, in alliance with Gruffudd ap Rhys of Deheubarth, gained a crushing victory over the Normans at Crug Mawr, near Cardigan, in 1136 and took possession of Ceredigion. The latter part of Gruffydd's reign was considered to be a "Golden Age"; according to the Life of Gruffudd ap Cynan Gwynedd was "bespangled with lime-washed churches like the stars in the firmament".

== Death and succession ==
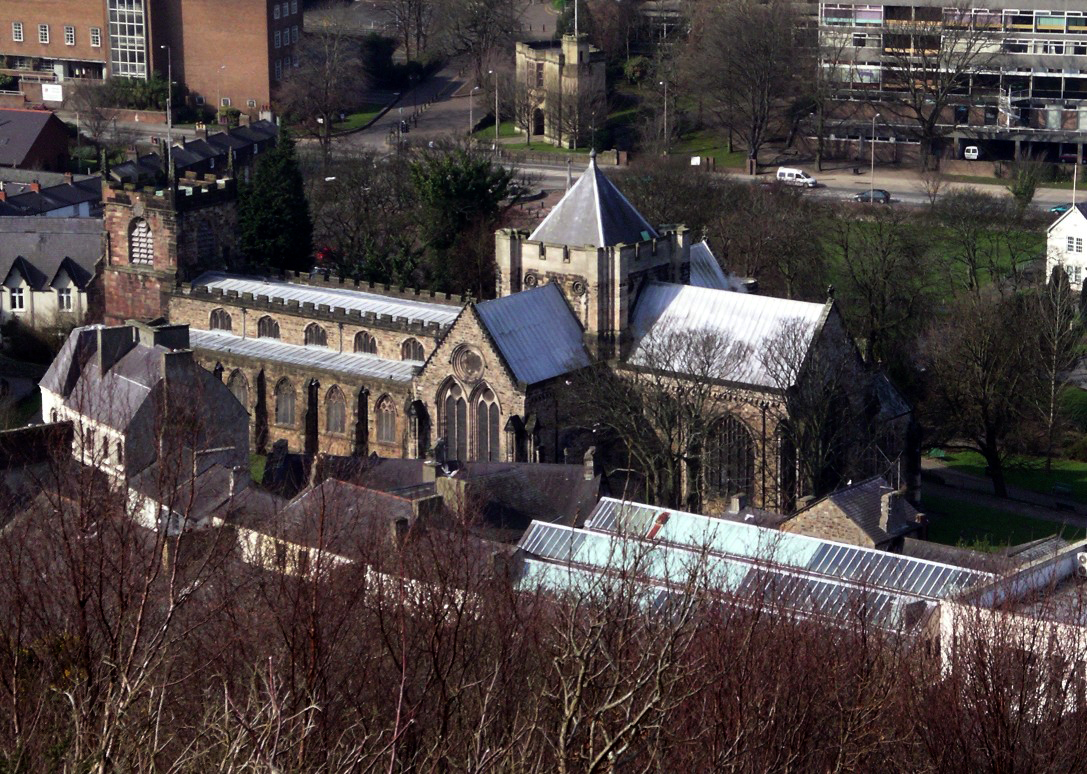
Gruffudd was buried in Bangor Cathedral.

Gruffudd died in his bed, old and blind in 1137, and was mourned by the annalist of Brut y Tywysogion as the "head and king and defender and pacifier of all Wales". He was buried by the high altar in Bangor Cathedral, which he had been involved in rebuilding. He also made bequests to many other churches, including one to Christ Church Cathedral, Dublin where he had worshipped as a boy. An elegy was sung for him by the poet Meilyr Brydydd, his wife Angharad survived him by 25 years. He was succeeded as king of Gwynedd by his son Owain Gwynedd. His daughter Gwenllian, who married Gruffudd ap Rhys of Deheubarth, son of his old ally Rhys ap Tewdwr, is also notable for her resistance to Norman rule.

== Legacy ==
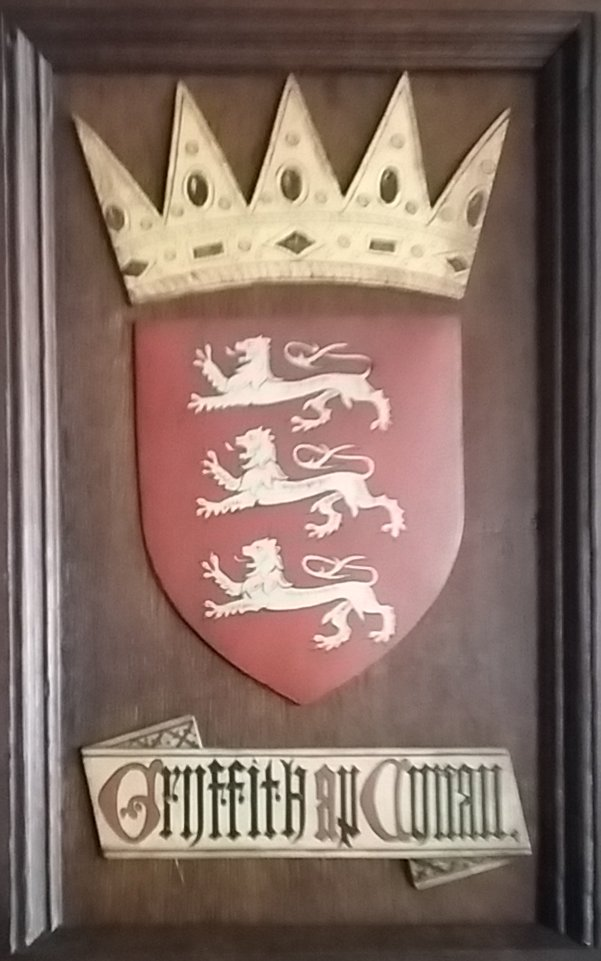
Gruffudd ap Cynan's Coats of Arms of Welsh King, Chirk Castle

According to Hywel Teifi Edwards, Gruffudd, according to legend, not only reformed the Welsh bardic tradition to accord with that of the Irish language bards but also sponsored an Eisteddfod at Caerwys during his reign as King of Gwynedd.

== Children ==
The family line of Gruffudd shows he had many children by several different women. With wife Angharad (daughter of Owain ab Edwin) he had:

- Cadwallon ap Gruffudd;
- Owain Gwynedd (Owain ap Gruffudd), married (1) Gwladus (Gladys) ferch Llywarch, daughter of Llywarch ap Trahaearn (2) Cristin ferch Goronwy, daughter of Goronwy ab Owain;
- Cadwaladr ap Gruffudd, married Alice de Clare, daughter of Richard Fitz Gilbert de Clare;
- Mareda/Marared ferch Gruffudd;
- Susanna ferch Gruffudd, married Madog ap Maredudd, prince of Powys;
- Ranulht/Rannillt ferch Gruffudd, married Madog ap Idnerth, King of Cynllibiwg;
- Agnes/Annest ferch Gruffudd;
- Gwenllian ferch Gruffudd, married Gruffydd ap Rhys, prince of Deheubarth.

The FitzRery family of Swords, County Dublin, who were prominent in Dublin politics and commercial life until the seventeenth century, claimed descent from Gruffudd: since he was born in Swords, and maintained close links with Ireland, the claim is not implausible.

== Ancestry ==
Gruffudd ap Cynan ancestry:

Ancestors of Gruffudd ap Cynan

8. Idwal ap Meuric
4. Iago ab Idwal ap Meurig
2. Cynan ab Iago
1. Gruffudd ap Cynan
12. Sigtrygg Silkbeard
6. Amlaíb mac Sitriuc
13. Sláine ingen Briain
3. Ragnailt ingen Amlaíb
14. Dúnlaing mac Tuathail, King of Leinster
7. Máelcorcre ingen Dúnlaing

== Sources ==
- Llwyd, Humphrey (2002). Cronica Walliae. University of Wales Press. ISBN 978-0-7083-1638-2.
- Lloyd, John Edward (2004). A History of Wales: From the Norman Invasion to the Edwardian Conquest. Barnes & Noble. ISBN 978-0-7607-5241-8.
- Davies, Robert R. (1991). The age of conquest: Wales 1063–1415. Oxford University Press. ISBN 0-19-820198-2.
- Simon Evans (1990). A Mediaeval Prince of Wales: the Life of Gruffudd Ap Cynan. Llanerch Enterprises. ISBN 0-947992-58-8.
- Hudson, Benjamin T. (2005). Viking Pirates and Christian Princes: Dynasty, Religion, and Empire in the North Atlantic (Illustrated ed.). United States: Oxford University Press. ISBN 0195162374.
- Jones, Arthur (1910). The history of Gruffydd ap Cynan. Manchester University Press. – maryjones.us Edition
- Maund, K. L. (1996). Gruffudd ap Cynan: a collaborative biography. Boydell & Brewer. ISBN 0-85115-389-5.
- Maund, Kari (2000). The Welsh kings. Stroud, Gloucestershire: Tempus pub. ISBN 9780752417882.
- Powel, David (1584). The historie of Cambria, now called Wales: a part of the most famous Yland of Brytaine, written in the Brytish language aboue two hundreth yeares past. Translated by Llwyd, Humphrey. London: Rafe Newberrie and Henrie Denham. IA historieofcambri00cara.
- Russell, Paul (15 September 2004). Vita Griffini Filii Conani: The Medieval Latin Life of Gruffudd Ap Cynan. University of Wales Press. ISBN 0708318932.
- Weis, Frederick Lewis (1992). Ancestral Roots of Certain American Colonists Who Came to America before 1700. Genealogical Publishing Com. pp. 176–226, 239–245. ISBN 0806313676.

Gruffudd ap Cynan House of Aberffraw Cadet branch of the House of Gwynedd Born: c. 1055 Died: 11 April 1137
Regnal titles
Preceded by Trahaearn ap Caradog	King of Gwynedd; 1081–1137	Succeeded by Owain Gwynedd
