= Battle of Glenmama =

Part of the Viking wars in Ireland

- Part of the First Leinster revolt against Brian Boru
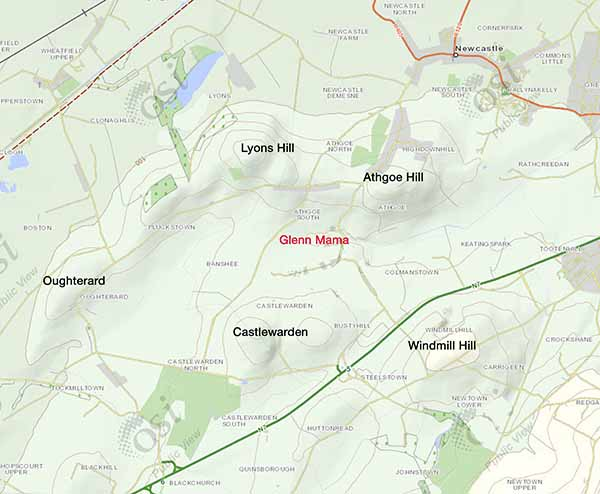
- Possible site of the battle of Glen Máma
Date	30 December 999
Location	Glenn Máma, near Lyons Hill in modern-day Ardclough, County Kildare 53°16′48″N 06°31′30″W
Result	Decisive Munster–Meath victory
Territorial changes	Occupation of Viking Dublin

Belligerents
Kingdom of Meath; Kingdom of Munster	Kingdom of Leinster Kingdom of Dublin

Commanders and leaders
Malachy MacDonnell; Brian Boru	Malachy MacMurrough; Colin, son of Eitigen †; Sitric Silkbeard^{[Note 1]} Harold Olafsson †^{[Note 2]}

Strength
Unknown	Unknown

Casualties and losses
Unknown	7,000 Vikings; Unknown Irish casualties
- Approximate location

The Battle of Glenn Máma or Glenmama (Irish: Cath Ghleann Máma, The Battle of "The Glen of the Gap") took place most probably near Lyons Hill in Ardclough, County Kildare, Ireland, in AD 999 between Windmill Hill and Blackchurch. It was the decisive and only engagement of the brief Leinster revolt of 999–1000 against the King of Munster, Brian Boru. In it, the combined forces of the Kingdoms of Munster and Meath, under King Brian Boru and the High King of Ireland, Máel Sechnaill II, inflicted a crushing defeat on the allied armies of Leinster and Dublin, led by King Máel Mórda of Leinster.

The two armies met in a narrow valley, causing a rout of Máel Mórda's army in at least three directions. They were pursued, and the main body of the army was slaughtered when they rallied at several fording points along the River Liffey. The main commanders were either killed or captured.

The battle resulted in the occupation of Dublin by Brian's Munster forces, and the submission of Máel Mórda and King Sigtrygg Silkbeard of Dublin to Brian Boru. The solution did not prove permanent, however, and eventually resulted in the second Leinster revolt against Brian and the Battle of Clontarf in 1014.

== Sources ==
The battle appears as an entry in a number of the Irish annals: namely, Annals of the Four Masters, the Annals of Ulster, the Chronicon Scotorum and the Annals of Innisfallen. The Irish annals "constitute a substantial and unique collection of annual records of ecclesiastical and political events", as written in the Irish monasteries from the mid-6th century to the end of the 16th century. Although the historical status of the retrospective entries on the pre-Christian and early Christian periods are uncertain, entries from the later 6th century on are contemporaneous. Collation of the annals has provided a reliable chronology for events in medieval Ireland.

There was cross-over between many of the annals, parts of which were copied from each other, but each collection reflects something of the monastery and district in which it was compiled. The Annals of Ulster reflect the viewpoint of areas of Ireland where they had influence, including Armagh, Fermanagh, Londonderry and the northern part of the province of Connacht. It was authored by Cathal Mac Manus, a 15th-century diocesan priest, and is considered one of the most important, "possibly the single most important", record of events in medieval Ireland. The Chronicon Scotorum (as with the Annals of Tigernach, Clonmacnoise and Roscrea) reflects political and ecclesiastical events relevant to the monastery and environs of Clonmacnoise in Leinster. The Annals of Innisfallen reflect the Munster viewpoint, in particular the monastery of Emly.

In the 1630s, the texts of these annals were compiled into a single, enormous compendium, known as the Annals of the Four Masters. In the process, the authors sometimes modified the chronology and content of some of the materials, and is thus chronologically untrustworthy. However, it is recognised that they saved for posterity material that would otherwise have been lost, and the entry contains the longest annalistic account of the battle.

The battle is also mentioned in more detail in the earlier, 12th century Cogadh Gaedhel re Gallaibh, edited in 1867 by James Henthorn Todd (1867), and includes a bardic poem commemorating the battle. "Part compilation and part romance", it was written based on the extant annals as a propaganda work to glorify Brian Ború and the Dál gCais dynasty. More recently, its worth as a historical record has been questioned; according to the 20th century medievalist Donnchadh Ó Corráin, it "influenced historiography, medieval and modern, out of all proportion to its true value". However, historians still recognise it as the "most important of the Irish sagas and historical romances concerning the Vikings".

== Location ==
Although nineteenth century scholars, including John O’Donovan and Todd, and especially the Dunlavin-based clergyman John Francis Shearman (in 1830) were tempted to locate the battle-site in the vicinity of Dunlavin, Co Wicklow, within their lifetime the theory was disputed by Goddard Orpen, and were disproved by Joseph Lloyd in 1914 and subsequently by Albha mac Gabhrain who located the battle site beside Ardclough on the Dublin-Kildare border in 1914 (the Irish form of Dunlavin is in reality Dun Luadhain). between Windmill Hill and Blackchurch.

Ailbhe Mac Shamhráin wrote:

Given the propensity for battles to take place in border regions, it seems reasonable to seek a location close to the perimeter of the Hiberno-Norse kingdom of Dublin. On that account, the suggestion of Lloyd, which places the battle at a gap now crossed by the Naas Road on the section between Kill and Rathcoole, is still worthy of consideration. In any event, the engagement took place within an easy day’s march of Dublin, as Brian pressed on immediately afterwards to reach the town on the following day.

== Background ==
In 997, at a royal meeting near Clonfert, Brian Boru, King of Munster, met with his long-time rival Máel Sechnaill mac Domnaill, who was at the time High King of Ireland. The Irish High Kingship in the 10th century denotes a king who had enforced his power over external territories. Máel Sechnaill assumed the Irish high-kingship after the Battle of Tara in 980.

The two kings made a truce, by which Brian was granted rule over the southern half of Ireland, while Máel Sechnaill retained the northern half and high kingship. In honour of this arrangement, Máel Sechnaill handed over to Brian the hostages he had taken from Dublin and Leinster; and in 998, Brian handed over to Máel Sechnaill the hostages of Connacht. In the same year, Brian and Máel Sechnaill began co-operating against the Norse of Dublin for the first time.

Late in 999, however, the Leinstermen, historically hostile to domination by either the Uí Néill overkings or the King of Munster, allied themselves with the Norse of Dublin and revolted against Brian. According to the 17th century Annals of the Four Masters, the following prophecy had predicted the Battle of Glenmama:

They shall come to Gleann-Mama,

It will not be water over hands,
Persons shall drink a deadly draught
Around the stone at Claen-Conghair.
From the victorious overthrow they shall retreat,
Till they reach past the wood northwards,
And Ath-cliath the fair shall be burned,

After the ravaging (of?) the Leinster plain.

== Battle ==
The Annals of the Four Masters records that Brian and Máel Sechnaill united their forces, and according to the Annals of Ulster, they met the Leinster-Dublin army at Glenmama on Thursday, 30 December 999. Glenmama, near Lyons Hill in County Kildare, was the ancient stronghold of the Kings of Leinster.

The Munster-Meath army defeated the Leinster-Dublin army. Later historians have also seen the battle as decisive. The sources point to high mortality on both sides. According to the Annals of Innisfallen, which represents a Munster perspective, "formna Gall herend" ('the best part of the foreigners of Ireland') fell therein. The more partisan Cogad Gáedel re Gallaib indulges in hyperbole, claiming that "since the Battle of Mag Rath to that time there had not taken place a greater slaughter". The fallen included Harald son of Amlaib (a brother of Sitriuc Silkbeard) and "other nobles of the foreigners", amongst whom was one Cuilén son of Eitigén, who apparently belonged to the Gailenga; he may have been a brother of Ruadacán son of Eitegén, king of Airther Gaileng, who died in 953.

On Brian's side, even the Cogadh acknowledges that "there fell many multitudes of the Dál Cais," but no details are provided. It says the battle was "bloody, furious, red, valiant, heroic, manly; rough, cruel and heartless;" and that there had been no greater slaughter since the seventh century Battle of Magh Rath.

Ó Corráin refers to it as a "crushing defeat" of Leinster and Dublin, while The dictionary of English history says the battle effectively "quelled" the "desperate revolt" of Leinster and Dublin. Tradition records that "the son of the King of the Danes", Harold Olafsson, was killed in the retreat, and was interred at the now obscure cemetery of Cryhelpe. Brian took Máel Mórda of Leinster prisoner and held him until he received hostages from the Leinstermen. It was alleged that 7,000 Norse fell in the battle. This was at a time when warfare was fought on a very limited scale, and raiding armies generally had between a hundred and two hundred men. Most importantly, the defeat left the road to Dublin "free and unimpeded for the victorious legions of Brian and Maelsechlainn".

== Sack of Dublin ==
The victory was followed up with an attack on the city of Dublin. Brian's forces marched quickly to Dublin (again consistent with a Saggart-Ardclough location for the battle) reaching the town on New Year's Eve 999. They entered its defences without any great resistance and the Annals of Innisfallen say that, on New Year's Day (the Kalends of January) 1000, they burned both the settlement itself and the nearby sacred grove, Caill Tomair (Old Irish 'Thor's Grove'), which apparently stood on the north side of the Liffey. The plunder of the town, for the second time in ten years, is described in considerable detail in the Cogaidh. The 12th century Cogadh Gaedhil re Gallaibh gives two accounts of the occupation: that Brian remained in Dublin from Christmas Day until Epiphany (6 January), or from Christmas Day until St. Brigid's Day (1 February). The later Annals of Ulster gives a date of 30 December for the Battle of Glenmama, while Annals of Inisfallen dates Brian's capture of the city two days later, to 1 January 1000. According to the much more reliable Annals of the Four Masters and the Chronicon Scotorum, Dublin was only occupied for a week by Munster forces. In any case, in 1000 Brian plundered the city, burned the Norse fortress and expelled its ruler, King Sigtrygg Silkbeard. Ailbhe Mac Shamhráin wrote:

Allowance must be made here for poetic license but, event itself, some picture can be obtained of the wealth of the trading centre that was Dublin. According to the account Brian, having plundered the dún (fortress), entered the margadh (market area) and here seized the greatest wealth. Meanwhile, on the approach of the Munster forces, King Sitriuc had fled northward hoping to obtain asylum among the Ulstermen. His ally, Máel-mórda of Uí Faeláin, was captured, in ignominious circumstances according to Cogad Gáedel re Gallaib.

== Aftermath ==
The kingship of Leinster was bestowed upon the Uí Dunchada candidate, Dunchad son of Domnail, who retained this status until he was deposed in 1003. Sigtrygg Silkbeard returned having found no asylum in the north. The annal accounts concur that he, too, yielded hostages to Brian while the Annals of Innisfallen add that Brian in a suitable magnanimous gesture, "gave the fort (dún) to the Foreigners." Ailbhe Mac Shamhráin wrote:

The implications here is that, from this time onwards, the Hiberno-Scandinavian ruler would hold his kingship from his Munster overlord. Brian, at this stage, aspired to an even tighter dominance of Dublin than that secured by his rival, Máel Sechnaill mac Domnaill, ten years earlier. There seems to be little doubt that the longer term beneficiary of Glenn Máma was Brian alone. With renewed confidence, he again moved against Máel Sechnaill mac Domnaill, even if his initiatives of 1000–1001 resulted in setbacks, one expedition into Brega resulted in his advance cavalry being slaughtered by the Uí Néill, another foray was reversed in Míde (Co Westmeath), and the Dál Cais river-fleet was impeded by the King of Tara and his Connachta allies having constructed a barrier across the Shannon. Brian, however, found a way of circumventing it and, early in 1002, brought a large army through to Athlone and took the hostages of Connacht.

According to the Cogadh Gaedhil re Gallaibh, Sigtrygg's flight from the city brought him north, first to the Ulaid and then to Áed of Cenél nEógain. Since Sigtrygg could find no refuge in Ireland, he eventually returned, submitted to Brian, gave hostages and was restored to Dublin. This was three months after Brian ended his occupation in February. In the meantime, Sigtrygg may have temporarily "turned pirate" and been responsible for a raid on St David's in Wales.

Brian gave his own daughter by his first wife in marriage to Sigtrygg. Brian in turn took as his second wife Sigtrygg's mother, the now three-times-married Gormflaith. The cessation of revolt was followed by over a decade of peace in Dublin while Sigtrygg's men served in the armies of Brian. However, Sigtrygg never forgot the insult of the Ulaid, and in 1002 he had his revenge when his soldiers served in Brian's campaign against the Ulaid and ravaged their lands.

Máel Sechnaill, who found the support of the northern kings slipping away, felt obliged to submit and a new political order was created. The capitulation of the king of Tara left Brian as the most powerful king in Ireland – the first non Uí Néill king to achieve such prominence. Ailbhe Mac Shamhráin wrote:

Glenn Máma gave Brian a psychological advantage over the king of Tara and increased his readiness to break the Agreement of Clonfert. As a result of the battle, he had achieved domination, in a meaningful sense, of Leinster and Dublin. Through achieving effective dominance of Dublin, Brian acquired a military (aside from a psychological) advantage over Máel Sechnaill, which helped him in his endeavours to reach beyond the lordship of Leth Moga. His success in this regard was probably instrumental in tying Dublin into the sphere of Leth Moga for at least a century to follow.

== See also ==
- Battle of Tara
- Battle of Clontarf

== Notes ==
1. Harald Olafsson is listed in the Annals of the Four Masters as "Aralt, son of Amhlaeibh"; and by James Henthorn Todd (p. 146) as "Harold, son of Amlaff". According to Downham (p. 245) "he can be identified as a son of Amlaíb mac Sitric (d. 980) and as a brother of Ragnall (d. 980), Glúniarann (d. 989) and Sitriuc (d. 1042)"

== Bibliography ==
- Lalor, Brian, ed. (2003). The Encyclopedia of Ireland. Gill and Macmillan. ISBN 0-7171-3000-2.
- Downham, Clare (2007). Viking Kings of Britain and Ireland: The Dynasty of Ivarr to A.D. 1014 (Illustrated ed.). Dunedin Academic Press. ISBN 978-1-903765-89-0.
- Hudson, Benjamin T. (2005). Viking Pirates and Christian Princes: Dynasty, Religion, and Empire in the North Atlantic (Illustrated ed.). United States: Oxford University Press. ISBN 978-0-19-516237-0.
- Low, Sidney; Pulling, Frederick Sanders (1911). The dictionary of English history (Fifth ed.). Cassell.
- MacManus, Seumas (1921). The Story of the Irish Race: A Popular History of Ireland. Ireland: The Irish Publishing Co. ISBN 0-517-06408-1.
- Ó Corráin, Donnchadh (1972). Ireland Before the Normans. Ireland: Gill and Macmillan.
- Todd, James Henthorn (1867). Cogadh Gaedhel re Gallaibh: The war of the Gaedhil with The Gaill, or, The invasions of Ireland by the Danes and other Norsemen. Longmans, Green, Reader, and Dyer.
- Ailbhe MacShamhráin, The battle of Glen Máma, Dublin. (53–64) In: Seán Duffy, Medieval Dublin II. (Dublin 2000) ISBN 1-85182-607-6
