= Gormlaith ingen Murchada =

10th-century Irish noblewoman

Gormlaith

High Queen consort of Ireland
- Reign: 980–1014
- Predecessor: Dublemna ingen Tigernán
- Successor: Máel Muire ingen Amlaíb

Queen consort of Dublin and York
- Reign: ?–981
- Predecessor: Dúnlaith
- Born: Naas, County Kildare, Ireland
- Died: 1030
- Spouses: Olaf Cuaran ?–981; Máel Sechnaill mac Domnaill ?–1002; Brian Boru 1002–1014
- Issue: Donnchad mac Briain, King of Munster; Sigtrygg Silkbeard, King of Dublin
- House: Leinster
- Father: Murchad mac Finn, King of Leinster

Gormlaith ingen Murchada (c. 960–1030), sometimes spelt Gormflaith, was an Irish queen.

== Life ==
Gormlaith was born in Naas, County Kildare, Ireland. Her father was Murchad mac Finn, King of Leinster, and her brother was Máel Mórda mac Murchada. According to annalistic accounts, she was married to Olaf Cuaran, the Viking king of Dublin and York until his death in 981, and was mother to his son, King Sigtrygg Silkbeard.

After Sigtrygg's defeat at the Battle of Glenn Máma in 999, Gormlaith was married to Brian Boru, the King of Munster and High King of Ireland, and mother to his son and later King of Munster, Donnchad. It is also alleged that she married Máel Sechnaill mac Domnaill after Olaf's death, but this is somewhat contentious as the sources for this marriage are less reliable. The Irish annals record Gormlaith's death in 1030.

Gormlaith is most infamous for allegedly inciting men to such a degree that she caused the Battle of Clontarf in 1014. Very little is known about the actual historical figure since the majority of depictions of Gormlaith were composed well after her life.

== Annalistic and genealogical accounts ==
The first annalistic account regarding Gormlaith appears in the Annals of Inisfallen, a major extant record of Munster history. The entry of her death was composed some 62 years after her death, making it the most contemporary and temporally proximate. This account stated,

The Daughter of Murchad son of Finn, queen of Munster, dies.

— Annals of Inisfallen, p. 197

Gormlaith's father was Murchad, son of Finn and this statement paired with Queen of Munster, leaves little doubt amongst scholars that this reference is to Gormlaith. The Annals of Tigernach are the next chronologically contemporaneous account with a reference to Gormlaith. These annals, compiled in the Irish midlands, stated,

Gormlaith, daughter of Murchad, son of Finn, mother of Sitric, son of Amlaíb Cuarán, king of the Foreigners, and of Donnachad, son of Brian, king of Munster, died.

— Annals of Tigernach, p. 371

Gormlaith also appears in genealogical accounts written more than 100 years after her death. The first of these accounts is found in the Banshenchas, a catalogue of famous medieval Irish women. The entry in this account echoed the annalistic accounts and names Olaf Cuaran and Brian Boru as her husbands and Sigtrygg and Donnchad as her sons. Gormlaith also appears in the twelfth-century genealogies found in the Book of Leinster dating from 1150 to 1201. From this entry derives the famous "three leaps" of Gormlaith poem, which states she made a "leap in Dublin, a leap in Tara and a leap in Cashel". Some scholars have used these "three leaps" as evidence of her three marriages to Olaf Cuaran, Brian Boru and Máel Sechnaill, contradicting the annalistic accounts which refer to only two marriages. In particular, the validity of this third marriage to Máel Sechnaill and her alleged divorce from Brian Boru, have been of serious contention amongst scholars. The "three leaps" poem contained in 12th-century genealogies is the only medieval Irish account to potentially suggest a third marriage. However, some scholars have argued that the reference here to "three leaps" is referring instead to children and not, in fact, to marriages.

== Mediaeval literary accounts ==
Gormlaith has been depicted in many contexts since her death, and she is arguably best known for her portrayal in the Cogadh Gaedhil re Gallaibh. This literary work of propaganda was composed between 1103 and 1111 by a descendant of Brian Boru, Muirchertach Ua Briain. This text detailed the ascent to power of his illustrious ancestor in an effort to highlight the prestige of his dynasty. Gormlaith makes her appearance in a singular scene in which she has garnered much notoriety in subsequent sources, is her inciting scene. To provide context: prior to this her brother, Mael Mordha, has ceded vassalage to Brian Boru.

"Now when they arrived at Cenn Cordah, the king took off his tunic, and it was carried to his sister to put a silver button on it, viz. to Gormlaith, daughter of Murchad, Brian's wife; and she was the mother of Donnchad, son of Brian. The queen took the tunic and cast it into the fire; and she began to reproach and incite her brother because she thought it ill that he should yield service and vassalage and suffer oppression from anyone or yield that which his father or grandfather never yielded and she said that his Brian's son would require the same thing from his son."

— Todd, Cogadh Gaedhel Re Gallaibh, p. 143.

In this depiction, Gormlaith, unsuccessfully, attempted to goad her brother into going to war against her husband Brian Boru.

Njál's Saga, a thirteenth-century Icelandic literary work, referred to her as Kormloð, and portrayed her as a jealous divorcee bent on revenge on her ex-husband Brian Boru.

"She was a very beautiful woman, but her best qualities were those over which she had no control, and it was commonly said that her character was evil insofar as she had control over it."

— Cook, Njál's Saga p. 296

In this narrative, she goads her son Sigtrygg, unlike the Cogadh, where she attempted to incite her brother, Mael Mordha. She prompted Sigtrygg to gather support from Vikings outside Ireland, most notably Earl Sigurd of Orkney and Brodir of the Isle of Man, by promising her hand in marriage. This is the first work to introduce the idea that Gormlaith was divorced from Brian Boru.

== Early Modern narrative texts ==
A separate strain of wholly negative conceptions of Gormlaith appeared in Geoffrey Keating's Foras Feasa Ar Eirinn composed in 1634. In this text Keating makes explicit the link between Gormlaith's goading and Máel Mórda's declaration of war. Gormlaith's remarks in this Early Modern account weighed on Máel Mórda, contributing to his quarrel with Murchad and eventually leading the "Leinster king to seek allies in the war against the Dál Cais". As to why Keating decided to place the cause of hostilities with Gormlaith is up for some debate. One scholar, Meidhbhín Ní Úrdail suggested that he was influenced by Meredith Hamner's Chronicle of Ireland published in 1633, where the cause of Clontarf is attributed not to Gormlaith, but an anonymous "merchant's wife". Keating's work would in turn influence a slightly later text of the same period, Cath Cluana Tarbh. Only one version of this work contains a reference to Gormlaith, but the depiction is derived from Keating.

== In popular culture ==
=== Fiction ===
- Gormflaith appears as a main character in the Gael Song trilogy by Shauna Lawless. The first book in the Irish historical fantasy series, The Children of Gods and Fighting Men (2022), was shortlisted for a British Fantasy Award for Best Newcomer. In the trilogy, Gormflaith is a member of an immortal race called the Fomorians, who once ruled the land. She schemes to wrest control of Ireland from the mortals and return her race to its former glory by inserting herself into the struggles between the Irish kings and the vikings, and manipulating events.
- Lion of Ireland, by the American-Irish author Morgan Llywelyn, is a novel about the life of the Irish hero and High King Brian Boru. Plot summary

The story begins with Brian as a child of around 8 or 9 and it ends with him as an 88-year-old man. The book shows his rise to power and his struggle to maintain it. His personal life is an important part of the plot, because Brian's war against Máel Mórda (leader of the Leinstermen) and Sihtric (king of Dublin) was to be inextricably connected with his complicated marital relations, in particular his marriage to Gormlaith, Máel Mórda's sister and Sihtric's mother, who had been in turn the wife of Amlaíb Cuarán, king of Dublin and York, then of Máel Sechnaill. Even though the book is based on a historical figure, most of it is fiction.

== See also ==
- Mongfind
