= Idwal ap Meurig =

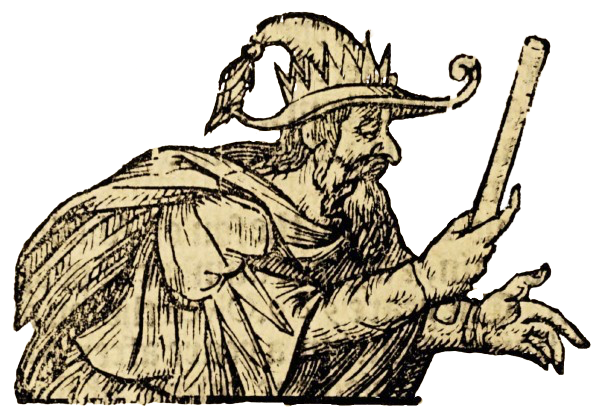
- A fanciful illustration of Idwal ap Meurig from the Historie of Cambria (1584)

King of Gwynedd
- Reign: c. 995-997
- Died: c. 997
- Father: Meurig ab Idwal Foel

Idwal ap Meurig (died 997), was king of Gwynedd.

He was the son of Meurig ab Idwal Foel, who, though the rightful heir to the throne, was killed in 986, in the course of one of the many struggles for the kingship which characterised the period from the death of Hywel Dda in 950 until the time of Gruffydd ap Llywelyn. Idwal, on the death of his father, fled for safety to the collegiate establishment at Llancarfan.

Maredudd ab Owain then succeeded in usurping the sovereignty of Gwynedd, and a few years after he marched on Glamorgan with an army of Danish mercenaries and laid waste the country; his object was to seize the fugitive Idwal, but in this he was unsuccessful.

By the year 995 the sons of Meurig gathered a sufficient following to return to North Wales, and, by defeating Maredudd at the battle of Llangwm, Idwal became king.

The Danes had overrun the country during Maredudd's reign: the churches had been spoiled, the people were demoralised, and there was a scarcity of food. Idwal is eulogised in the Gwentian Chronicle for his bravery and statesmanship in attempting to repair these disasters. But he was killed in 997 in attempting to expel the Danes, who, under Sweyn, the son of Harald, were once more devastating Anglesey. He left an infant son, Iago ab Idwal ap Meurig.

== Sources ==
- Powel, David (1584). The historie of Cambria, now called Wales: a part of the most famous Yland of Brytaine, written in the Brytish language aboue two hundreth yeares past. Translated by Llwyd, Humphrey. London: Rafe Newberrie and Henrie Denham. IA historieofcambri00cara.
