= Historia Gruffud vab Kenan =

Medieval Welsh text

The Historia Gruffud Vab Kenan, also known as The History of Gruffudd ap Cynan, is a medieval Welsh text about the king of Gwynedd Gruffudd ap Cynan. The text was written in Middle Welsh but was translated from the original text Vita Griffini Filii Conani which was written in Latin and was written sometime during the lifetime of Owain Gwynedd, the successor of Gruffudd ap Cynan. Until recently it was believed that the Vita Griffini Filii Conani text had been lost, but recently the scholar Paul Russell has shown that the Latin text of the History of Gruffudd ap Cynan found in the Peniarth manuscript 434E preserves the original Latin text rather than being translation into Latin of the Middle Welsh text Historia Gruffud vab Kenan.
