= Sigtrygg Silkbeard =

Hiberno-Norse King of Dublin

King of Dublin
- Reign: 989/995–1036
- Predecessor: Glúniairn / Ivar of Waterford
- Successor: Echmarcach mac Ragnaill
- Born: c. 970; Dublin
- Died: 1042 (aged 72); Dublin
- Spouse: Sláine
- Issue: Olaf
- Dynasty: Uí Ímair
- Father: Olaf Cuarán
- Mother: Gormflaith ingen Murchada

Sigtrygg II Silkbeard Olafsson (also Sihtric, Sitric and Sitrick in Irish texts; or Sigtryg and Sigtryggr in Scandinavian texts) was a Hiberno-Norse king of Dublin (possibly AD 989–994; restored or began 995–1000; restored 1000 and abdicated 1036) of the Uí Ímair dynasty. He was caught up in the abortive Leinster revolt of 999–1000, after which he was forced to submit to the King of Munster, Brian Boru. His family also conducted a double-marriage alliance with Boru, although he later realigned himself with the main leaders of the Leinster revolt of 1012–1014. He has a prominent role in the 12th-century Irish medieval text Cogadh Gaedhil re Gallaibh and the 13th-century Icelandic Njal's Saga, as the main Norse leader at the Battle of Clontarf (1014).

Sigtrygg's long reign spanned 46 years, until his abdication in 1036. During that period, his armies saw action in four of the five Irish provinces of the time. In particular, he conducted a long series of raids into territories such as Meath, Wicklow, Ulster, and perhaps even the coast of Wales. He also battled with rival Norse kings, especially in Cork and Waterford.

He went on a pilgrimage to Rome in 1028 and is associated with the foundation of Christ Church Cathedral in Dublin. Although Dublin underwent several reversals-of-fortune throughout his reign, on the whole, trade in the city flourished. He died at age 72 in 1042.

== Life ==
=== Family ===
Sigtrygg was of Norse and Irish ancestry. He was a son of Olaf Cuarán (also called Kváran), King of York and of Dublin, and Gormlaith ingen Murchada. Gormlaith was the daughter of the King of Leinster, Murchad mac Finn, and the sister of his successor, King Máel Mórda of Leinster. She went on to marry the King of Meath and High King of Ireland, Máel Sechnaill, and subsequently Brian Boru. She was a beautiful, powerful and intriguing Irish woman, who, according to the 13th-century Icelandic Njál's saga, was "the fairest of all women, and best gifted in everything that was not in her own power, but it was the talk of men that she did all things ill over which she had any power". Sigtrygg's paternal half-brother was Glúniairn, or "Iron-knee", who ruled as King of Dublin from 980-989.

An incident involving the ransom of one of Sigtrygg's sons, late in his reign, in which "seven score British horse" were mentioned in the list of demands, suggests that Dublin was one of the main ports for importing horses into 11th-century Ireland; it is thought that Sigtrygg and his family may have been personally involved in animal husbandry.

=== King of Dublin ===
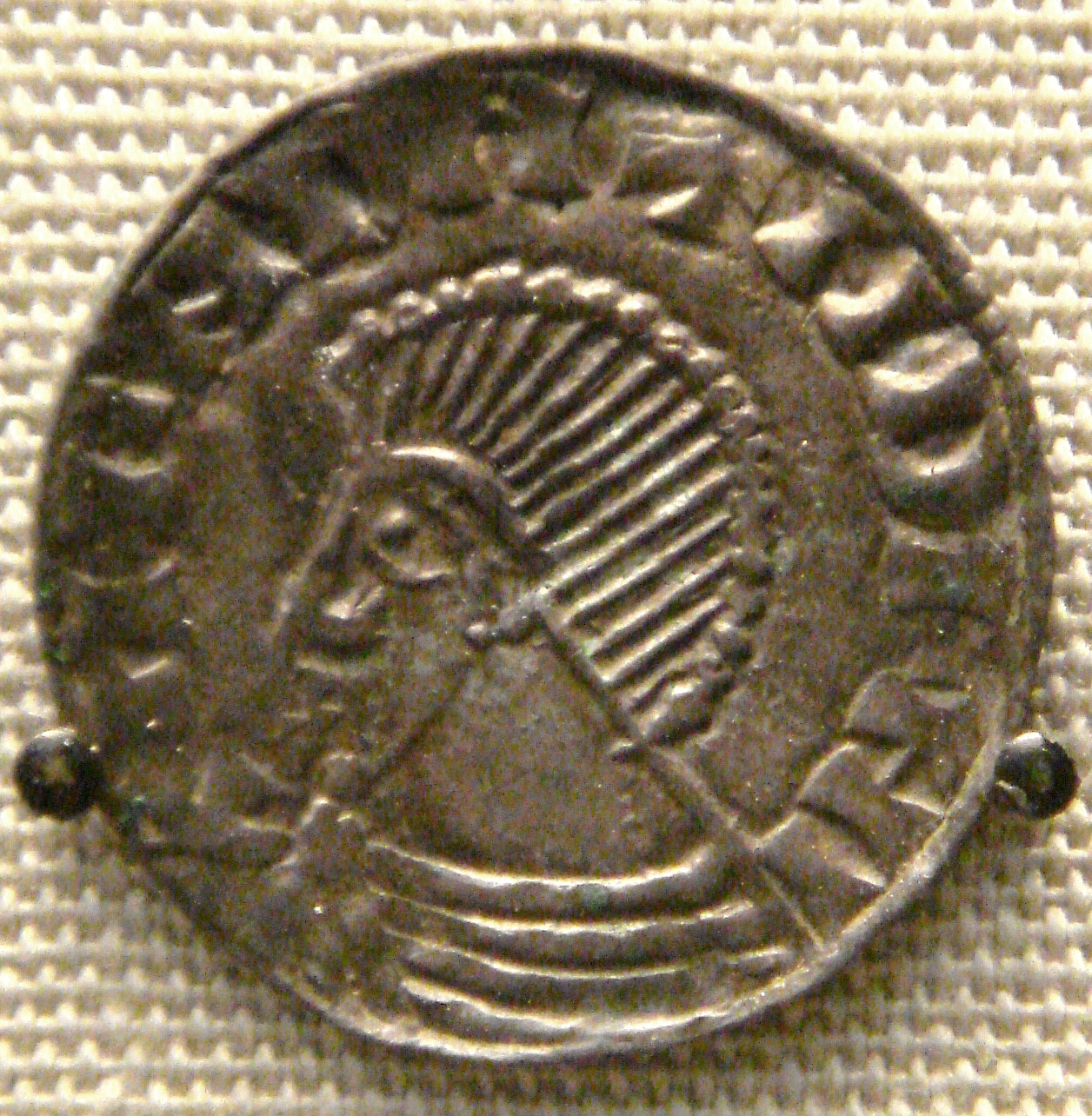
A posthumous "Sihtric" coin from the British Museum, minted at Dublin c. 1050

Sigtrygg may have succeeded his paternal half-brother Glúniairn as king of Dublin in 989, but it is just as likely his rival Ivar of Waterford came to power in the city then. The Irish annals record little information about Sigtrygg, his family or Dublin during these first five years of his reign. Benjamin Hudson claims this was because of the arrival of the future King of Norway, Olaf Tryggvason, who took up residence in Dublin for a few years after marrying Sigtrygg's sister Gytha. Tryggvason had met Gytha while raiding along the coasts of the Irish Sea. The presence of a powerful Viking leader in Dublin was a deterrent to Irish raids, and Tryggvason may have weakened Sigtrygg's foes by plundering them.

Hudson argues that Tryggvason's return to Norway in 994 coincided with the temporary expulsion of Sigtrygg from Dublin by his rival Ivar of Waterford. Ivar may have already ruled there from 989 until forced-out by Sigtrygg in 993; much depends on interpretation. Nevertheless, Sigtrygg was back within a year. In 995, he and his nephew, Muirchertach Ua Congalaich, attacked the church at Donaghpatrick in County Meath. In retaliation, Máel Sechnaill entered Dublin and took the ring of Thor and the sword of Carlus. Sigtrygg then attacked Kells and Clonard in 997. In 998, Máel Sechnaill and the King of Munster, Brian Boru, forced Sigtrygg to recognise their lordship by giving hostages.

Sigtrygg realised that Dublin's wealth made him a target, and that his city needed powerful allies and walls. The Dublin countryside did not provide sufficient resources for competition against powerful Irish princes. Sigtrygg first allied with his maternal uncle, Máel Mórda mac Murchada, King of the Uí Fáeláin of north Leinster. In 999, they defeated their cousin, the King of Leinster, Donnchad mac Domhnaill, and imprisoned him in Dublin.

==== First Leinster revolt against Brian Boru ====
Late in 999, the Leinstermen, historically hostile to domination by either the Uí Néill overkings or the king of Munster, allied themselves with the Norse of Dublin and revolted against Brian Boru. This provided the opportunity for Sigtrygg's second alliance with Máel Mórda mac Murchada. Brian's forces inflicted a crushing defeat on the united Leinster-Dublin army at the Battle of Glenmama, and followed the victory with an attack on the city of Dublin. The 12th-century Cogadh Gaedhil re Gallaibh gives two accounts of the occupation: Brian remained in Dublin from Christmas Day until Epiphany (6 January), or from Christmas Day until St. Brigid's Day (1 February). The later Annals of Ulster date the Battle of Glenmama to 30 December 999, while the Annals of Inisfallen date Brian's capture of the city to 1 January 1000. In any case, in 1000, Brian plundered the city, burned the Norse fortress, and expelled Sigtrygg.

According to the Cogadh Gaedhil re Gallaibh, Sigtrygg's flight from the city took him north, first to the Ulaid and then to Aéd of Cenél nEógain. Both tribes refused to help him. As Sigtrygg could find no refuge in Ireland, he eventually returned, submitted to Brian, gave hostages and was restored to Dublin three months after Brian ended his occupation in February. In the meantime, Sigtrygg may have temporarily "turned pirate" and been responsible for a raid on St David's in Wales.

Around this time, Sigtrygg married Sláine, Brian's daughter by his first wife; Brian, in-turn, took Sigtrygg's mother, the now three-times-married Gormflaith, as his second wife.

==== Years between the revolts ====
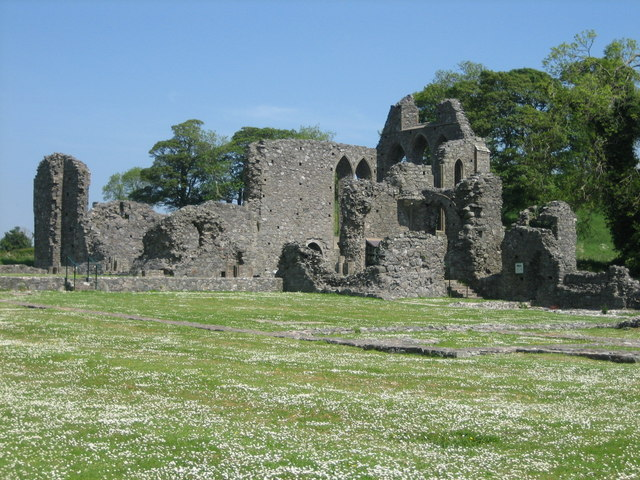
Inch Abbey (Inis Cumhscraigh), plundered by Sigtrygg in 1002

Dublin enjoyed a sustained period of peace while Sigtrygg's men served in the armies of Brian. Sigtrygg never forgot the Ulaid's refusal of aid when he fled from Dublin and, in 1002, he had his revenge when his soldiers served in Brian's campaign against the Ulaid and ravaged their lands. His fleet raided Ulster, and he plundered Kilclief and Inis Cumhscraigh, taking many prisoners from both. They served under Brian against the Ulaid again in 1005, and against the Northern Uí Néill in 1006 and 1007. Cenél Conaill, the last of the Northern Uí Néill Kingdoms, submitted in 1011, and Brian was formally recognised as High King throughout Ireland.

A remembrance of Sigtrygg's reign during these years is preserved in the late medieval Icelandic Saga of Gunnlaug Serpent's Tongue. Only fragments survive of the verses in the Sigtryggsdrápa, a drápa composed by the skald Gunnlaug Illugason while visiting Sigtrygg's court. The verses praise Sigtrygg for his royal ancestry, and describe Dublin as a busy, thriving port. Archaeological excavations of ships, gold, clothing, and pieces for games from around this time seem to confirm the description. According to the prose, Sigtrygg considered rewarding the poet with ships and gold, but instead granted him a new suit of clothes.

==== Second Leinster revolt against Brian Boru ====
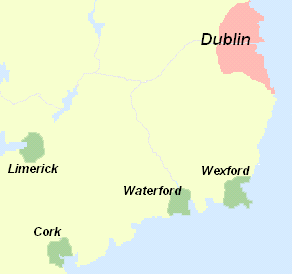
The Viking settlements of Cork, Limerick, Waterford and Wexford (Part of the Kingdom of Munster, under the control of Boru) The Kingdom of Dublin, under the control of Sigtrygg

Sometime during the 1010s, Brian Boru divorced Queen Gormflaith, and she began to engineer opposition to the High King. Around 1012, relations between Brian and Leinster had become so strained that revolt broke out among the Leinstermen. Sigtrygg aligned himself with the forces of Máel Mórda, leader of the revolt, and the chiefs Ua Ruairc, Ua Néill, and others. Together, they defeated Brian's ally Máel Sechnaill near the town of Swords, and Brian for the moment was unable to render assistance.

Sigtrygg sent his son Oleif to lead a fleet south to Munster to burn the Viking settlement of Cork. The fleet also attacked Cape Clear, crippling Brian's naval power, which was concentrated in Cork.

According to Njál's saga, Gormflaith "egged on her son Sigtrygg very much to kill King Brian", sending him to win the support of Earl Sigurd of Orkney, and Bróðir and Óspak of Man at any price. Sigtrygg arrived in Orkney for Sigurd's Yule feast, where he sat in a high seat between the two brothers-in-law, Earl Sigurd of Orkney and Earl Gilli of the Southern Isles. The saga also records that Sigtrygg was very interested in the Burning of Njáll Þorgeirsson at Bergþórshvoll and what had happened since. Afterwards, Sigtrygg bade Sigurd to go to war with him against Brian. Despite Sigurd's initial hesitance, and against the advice of his men, he eventually agreed to arrive in Dublin by Palm Sunday with all his men, on the condition that if Brian was slain, Sigurd would marry Gormflaith and become King of Ireland.

Sigtrygg went next to Man, where he also persuaded Bróðir to be in Dublin by Palm Sunday, where he promised Bróðir too that, if successful, he would be allowed to marry Gormflaith and become King of Ireland; the terms of this agreement were kept-secret. Óspak was dissatisfied with the arrangement, and refused to "fight against so good a king".

The two forces met at the Battle of Clontarf, on Good Friday in 1014, a battle that claimed the lives of the main commanders on both sides: Brian and his son Murchad on the Munster side; and Máel Mórda, Sigurd and Bróðir on the Leinster-Norse side. According to Irish sources, Sigtrygg did not take part in the battle, but held his garrison in reserve in Dublin. The Cogadh Gaedhil re Gallaibh records that Sigtrygg was able to observe the progress of the battle and the movement of the battle standards from the ramparts of his fortress. As the modern Irish medievalist historian Donnchadh Ó Corráin notes, Sigtrygg "wisely kept within the city and lived to tell the tale".

Earlier Scandinavian sources (the Orkneyinga saga, Njál's saga and the Darraðarljóð, composed soon after the battle) contend that he did actually fight valiantly at Clontarf. The Darraðarljóð, showing the persistence of paganism among the Vikings of Dublin, describes the Valkyries as following the "young king" Sigtrygg into battle. Njal's Saga records that Sigtrygg was on the wing opposite Óspak of Man for the whole battle, and that Óspak eventually put the king to flight.

==== Reign after Clontarf ====
Immediately after Clontarf, Sigtrygg's fortunes appear to have declined, even though he emerged with his kingdom intact. Máel Sechnaill, now again recognised as high king, was undoubtedly the battle's main beneficiary. In 1015, plague struck Dublin and Leinster, and Máel Sechnaill seized the opportunity to march south to burn Dublin's suburbs. While Sigtrygg was able to ally with Leinster for another attack on Meath in 1017, the alliance was dissolved when Sigtrygg blinded his cousin Bróen, Máel Morda's son and heir, in Dublin.

In 1018, Sigtrygg plundered Kells; he "carried off innumerable spoils and prisoners, and slew many persons in the middle of the church". These captives would either have been ransomed or sold off into Dublin's lucrative slave trade. When Sigtrygg raided south in 1021, he was defeated at Delgany in County Wicklow where the new King of Leinster, Augaire mac Dúnlainge, "made a dreadful slaughter of the foreigners" in the Kingdom of Breifne. In 1022, the Dublin fleet sailed north against the Ulaid, only to be destroyed in a naval battle against Niall mac Eochaid, after which the Norse crews and ships were taken prisoner.

According to the American medievalist historian Benjamin Hudson, "matters went from bad to worse" for Sigtrygg after the death of Máel Sechnaill in 1022. The great Irish princes began to compete for the High Kingship, and the political situation in Ireland became chaotic as there was no clear choice for supremacy. Accordingly, "Dublin became a prize for those who would rule Ireland and wanted the town's wealth to finance their ambitions."

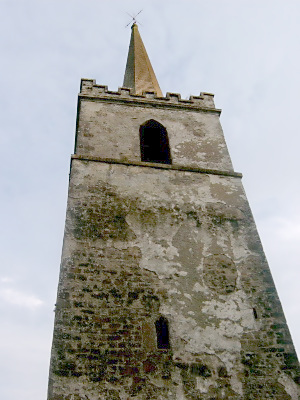
The medieval tower of the stone church of Ardbraccan, County Meath, in which Sigtrygg burned over 200 men

Hostages were taken from Sigtrygg by Flaithbertach Ua Néill, King of Cenél nEógain and the Uí Néill, and Donnchad mac Briain of Munster in 1025 and 1026 respectively, in support of their bids for the high kingship. These hostages brought no security, and Dublin was raided in 1026 by Niall mac Eocada of the Ulaid in revenge for the naval attack of 1022. Sigtrygg formed a new alliance with the men of Brega. In 1027, Sigtrygg's son Olaf joined Donnchad of Brega in a raid on Staholmock, County Meath. Sigtrygg and Donnchad's army was defeated by the men of Meath under their king, Roen Ua Mael Sechlainn. Sigtrygg rallied to the fight again at Lickblaw (near Castlepollard, Westmeath) where Donnchad and Roen were slain.

In 1029, Sigtrygg's son Olaf was taken prisoner by the new lord of Brega, Mathghamhain Ua Riagain. Sigtrygg was forced to pay a ransom of 1,200 cows, 140 British horses, 60 ounces of gold and of silver, "the sword of Carlus", the Irish hostages of Leinster and Leath Cuinn, "four hostages to Ua Riagain as a security for peace, and the full value of the life of the third hostage". An additional 80 cows "for word and supplication" were to be paid to the man who entreated for Olaf's release. The incident illustrates the importance of ransoming noble captives, as a means of political manipulation, increasing one's own revenues and exhausting the resources of one's foes.

Sigtrygg's fortunes improved in the 1030s. In 1030, he allied with the North Sea Emperor, Cnut the Great, and together their fleets raided Wales. A Dublin colony was established in Gwynedd, and for the following years Sigtrygg was at the height of his power. In 1032, without allies, Sigtrygg won a victory on the Boyne estuary of a type previously unseen by his dynasty for two decades, against a coalition of three kingdoms: over 300 members of the Conailli, the Ui Tortain, and the Ui Meith were captured or killed at the Battle of Inbher Boinne. In 1035, he plundered the celebrated stone church of Ardbraccan in Meath, burned 200 men inside, and carried another 200 off into captivity. In revenge, the church at Swords was plundered and burned by Conchobhar Ua Maeleachlainn, who took away cattle and captives.

Meanwhile, in a renewal of ancient feuds that same year, Sigtrygg executed Ragnall King of Waterford, in Dublin. Ragnall was the grandson of the Ivar, Sigtrygg's earliest rival, who had contested for Dublin decades before. Echmarcach mac Ragnaill, King of the Isles forced Sigtrygg to abdicate in 1036. Sigtrygg died in exile, at an unknown place, in 1042.

== Issue and legacy ==
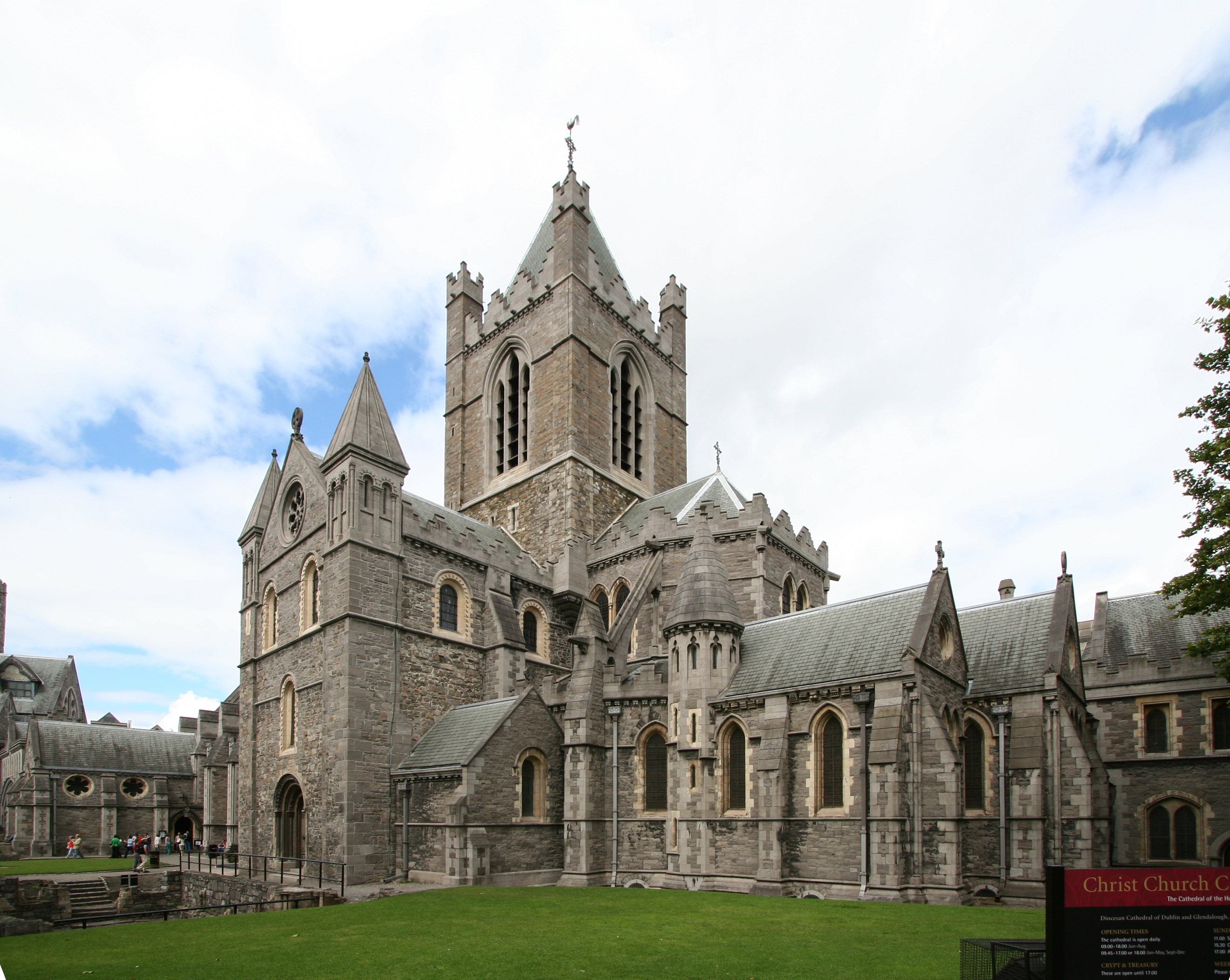
Christ Church Cathedral, founded by Sigtrygg c.1028

Sigtrygg married Brian Boru's daughter, Sláine, and they had one son: Olaf (d. 1034). According to the Annals of the Four Masters, Olaf "was slain by the Saxons" on his way on a pilgrimage to Rome. Olaf was survived by a daughter, Ragnhild, who was the mother of Gruffudd ap Cynan and from whom the Kings of Gwynedd were descended.

Separately from Sláine, Sigtrygg had five children: Artalach (d. 999), Oleif (d. 1013), Godfrey (d. 1036), Glúniairn (d. 1031) and Cellach (d. 1042). The annals record the death of Oleif—"son of the lord of the foreigners"—who was killed in revenge for the burning of Cork. Glúniairn was killed by the people of South Brega in 1031. Godfrey was killed in Wales in 1036 by one Sitric, "son of Glúniairn"—as factionalism was common among Viking settlers, this could have been the same Glúniairn as Sigtrygg's half-brother, thus making Godfrey and his killer cousins. Sigtrygg's daughter Cellach died in the same month as her father.

Sigtrygg was also, according to the Oxford Dictionary of National Biography, "a patron of the arts, a benefactor of the church, and an economic innovator". In the 990s, he established Ireland's first mint, in Dublin. He established a bishopric at Dublin and in 1028 he made a pilgrimage to Rome. It is thus possible to attribute the origins of the establishment of territorial bishoprics in Ireland on the Roman model, one of the most important results of 11th-century Irish Church Reform, to Sigtrygg. He went on to found Christ Church Cathedral in Dublin, which today is the oldest building in Dublin, but relatively young in comparison to the many monastic cathedrals in the rest of Ireland. Like many of the other coastal cathedrals in Ireland, it is of Hiberno-Norse origin. The cathedral, initially a wooden building, was rebuilt in stone in the 1180s following the arrival of the Anglo-Normans to Ireland, led by Richard de Clare, 2nd Earl of Pembroke.

== See also ==
- History of Ireland (800–1169)
- History of Dublin
- Church of Ireland

== Footnotes ==
Regnal titles
Preceded by Glúniairn (Ivar of Waterford)	King of Dublin	Succeeded by Echmarcach mac Ragnaill
