= Iago ab Idwal ap Meurig =

King of Gwynedd from 1023 to 1039

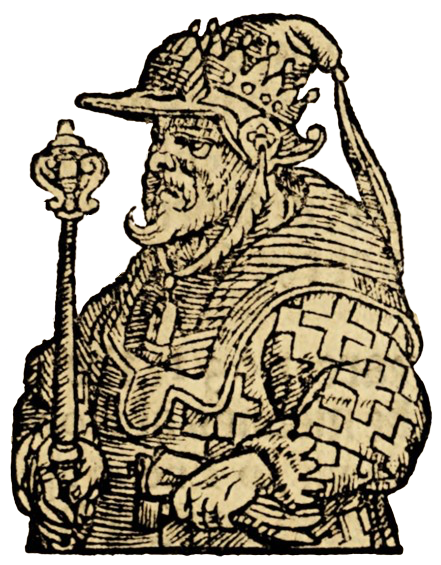
- A fanciful illustration of Iago ab Idwal ap Meurig from the Historie of Cambria (1584)

King of Gwynedd
- Reign: c. 1023-1039
- Predecessor: Hywel Dda
- Died: c. 1039
- Father: Idwal ap Meurig

Iago ab Idwal ap Meurig (died c. 1039) was a King of Gwynedd and of Powys. He was also referred to as "King of the Britons" in the Annals of Ulster. He was a son of Idwal ap Meurig.

On the death of Llywelyn ap Seisyll in 1023, the rule of Gwynedd returned to the House of Aberffraw with the accession of Iago, who was a great-grandson of Idwal Foel.

Very little is known about the reign of Iago. He was killed by his own men in 1039 and replaced by Llywelyn ap Seisyll's son, Gruffydd ap Llywelyn. Iago's grandson Gruffudd ap Cynan later won the throne of Gwynedd, and because his father, Cynan ab Iago, was little known in Wales, Gruffudd was styled "grandson of Iago" rather than the usual "son of Cynan".

Preceded by Llywelyn ap Seisyll	Kingdom of Gwynedd; 1023–1039	Succeeded by Gruffydd ap Llywelyn
