= Meidhbhín Ní Úrdail =

Irish academic

Meidhbhín Ní Úrdail is an Irish academic. She is Professor in Modern Irish at University College Dublin. She also worked at the school of Celtic Studies at the Dublin Institute for Advanced Studies from 2001 to 2002. Ní Úrdail's areas of research include the Irish manuscript tradition; Ireland's vernacular written tradition from medieval times to the nineteenth century; narrative discourse and historical representation; the complementary relationship between script and print in eighteenth- and nineteenth-century Ireland; and contemporary Irish writing and its heritage. On 16 March 2021, she was elected a member of the Royal Irish Academy and was admitted on 21 May 2021.

== Selected bibliography ==
- "Pádraig Ó Laoghaire (1870-1896): an Irish scholar from the Béarra Peninsula". Cork: Béarra Historical Society, 2021
- "Patrick Ferriter (1856-1924): an Irish scholar at home and abroad" in The American Journal of Irish Studies 15, 2019
- "Dán teagascach dar tús A dhuine cuímhnigh ar do chríochaibh déidheancha" in Saoi na féile: aistí ar litríocht an ochtú haois déag in onóir do Úna Nic Éinrí, eds. Stephen Newman, Breandán Ó Cróinín, Liam Ó Pairín. Baile Átha Cliath: Coiscéim, 2018
- "Na lámhscríbhinní Gaeilge in Ollscoil Mhá Nuad" in Léachtaí Cholm Cille 48, 2018
- "An Ghaeilge do choimeád ar bun agus ar buaintseasamh: the exceptional case of the Ó Longáin family of scribes" in The Ó Longáin family: making manuscripts in Co. Cork, ed. Pádraig Ó Macháin. Cork: Cork University Press, 2018
- "A Cork scribe in Victorian London" in Travelling Irishness in the long nineteenth century, eds. Christina Morin, Marguérite Corporaal. London: Palgrave MacMillan, 2017
- "The battle of Clontarf in later Irish tradition" in Medieval Dublin XVI, ed. Seán Duffy. Dublin: Four Courts Press, 2017
- "Tadhg Ó Neachtain agus Muiris Ó Conaill ag trácht ar bhlianta an áir, 1739–42" in Culture and society in Ireland since 1750: essays in honour of Gearóid Ó Tuathaigh, eds. Niall Ó Cíosáin, John Cunningham. Dublin: Lilliput, 2015
- "Cion an éigis" in Mo ghnósa leas an dáin: aistí in ómós do Mháirtín Ó Direáin, eds. Meidhbhín Ní Úrdail, Caoimhín Mac Giolla Léith. An Daingean: An Sagart, 2014
- "Ludwig Christian Stern, 'ollamh is seanchaidhe'" in Léachtaí Cholm Cille 43, 2013
- "Adhlacadh mo Mháthar" in Comhar 72, 2012
- "Léann agus litríocht sa naoú céad déag: cás Chúige Uladh" in Teanga agus litríocht na Gaeilge i gCúige Uladh sa naoú céad déag. Éigse Loch Lao 1 eds. Fionntán de Brún, Séamus Mac Mathúna. Belfast: University of Ulster, 2012
- Cath Cluana Tarbh. The battle of Clontarf. London: Irish Texts Society, 2011
- "The literary legacy of Keating's Foras Feasa ar Éirinn" in Geoffrey Keating's Foras Feasa ar Éirinn: Reassessments, ed. Pádraig Ó Riain. London: Irish Texts Society, 2008
- "The representation of the feminine: some evidence from Irish language sources" in Eighteenth-Century Ireland 22, 2007
- Éigse: a journal of Irish studies. Dublin: National University of Ireland, 2006
- "Annála Inse Faithleann an ochtú céad déag agus cath Chluain Tarbh" in Eighteenth-Century Ireland. Iris an Dá Chultúr 20, 2005
- "Dichter der nachklassischen Zeit Irlands und ihre Vision" in Keltologie heute — Themen und Fragestellungen, ed. Erich Poppe Münster: Nodus, 2004
- "Two poems attributed to Muireadhach Albanach Ó Dálaigh" in Ériu 53, 2003
- The scribe in eighteenth- and nineteenth-century Ireland: motivations and milieu. Münster: Nodus Publikationen, 2000
- "The literary traditions of the O'Mahonys: Irish and European connections" in Irisleabhar Uí Mhathúna 17, 1994
