= Amlaíb mac Sitriuc =

Son of King of Dublin

Amlaíb mac Sitriuc ("Amhlaeibh, son of Sitric") or Olaf Sigtryggsson, was the son of Sigtrygg Silkbeard, the Hiberno-Norse King of Dublin, and Sláine, the daughter of Brian Boru. A member of the Uí Ímair dynasty, his ancestors also included Amlaíb Cuarán and Gormflaith, who were influential in medieval Ireland. He was held to ransom by the Gaelic lord of Brega and later killed in England by Anglo-Saxons while on his way on pilgrimage to Rome in 1034. He thus predeceased his father. Some of his descendants later became the Kings of Gwynedd in Wales.

== Life ==
=== Family ===
Amlaíb was the son of the ruling King of Dublin, Sigtrygg Silkbeard (d. 1042), and his wife Sláine, daughter of the King of Munster and High King of Ireland, Brian Boru (d. 1014), and his first wife. His paternal grandfather was Amlaíb Cuarán (d. 981), the powerful King of York and of Dublin. Amlaíb Cuarán's wife was Gormflaith (d. 1030), a "beautiful, powerful and intriguing Irish woman" who later married Boru at the same time Sigtrygg married Sláine.

He may have had a son killed at the Battle of Clontarf (1014), as The Annals of the Four Masters record the deaths of a number of notable Norsemen, including "Dubhghall, son of Amhlaeibh, and Gillaciarain, son of Gluniairn, two tanists of the foreigners;" This Dubhgall is also mentioned elsewhere as the grandson of Sigtrygg Silkbeard.

Amlaíb had four half-brothers: Artalach (d. 999), Oleif (d. 1013), Godfrey (d. 1036), Glúniairn (d. 1031). Oleif was killed in immediate vengeance for the burning of the Norse city of Cork. Glúniairn was killed by the people of South Brega in 1031. Godfrey was killed in Wales, possibly by a first cousin. Amlaíb was outlived by his half-sister Cellach, who died in 1042 in the same month as her father.

=== Politics ===
In 1027, after the death of Máel Sechlainn II in 1022 and the chaos which accompanied the subsequent bids for the High Kingship by the Irish princes, Sigtrygg Silkbeard was forced to make a new alliance with the men of Brega. Amlaíb joined Donnchad of Brega in a raid on Staholmock, County Meath. The army of Sigtrygg and Donnchad was defeated by the men of Meath under their king, Roen Ua Mael Sechlainn. Sigtrygg rallied to the fight again, and fought a battle at Lickblaw (near Castlepollard, Westmeath) where Donnchad and Roen were slain.

In 1029, Amlaíb was taken prisoner by the new King of Brega, Mathghamhain Ua Riagain, who exacted a ransom of 1,200 cows for his release. Further conditions of the agreement necessitated payment of another 140 British horses, 60 ounces of gold and of silver, "the sword of Carlus", the Irish hostages of Leinster and Leath Cuinn, "four hostages to Ua Riagain as a security for peace, and the full value of the life of the third hostage." Added to the total, 80 cows "for word and supplication" were to be paid to the man who entreated for Amlaíb's release. The incident illustrates the importance of ransoming noble captives, as a means of political manipulation, increasing one's own revenues and exhausting the resources of one's foes. The demand of British horses also suggests that Dublin was one of the main ports for importing horses into 11th century Ireland, and that Amlaíb's family may have been personally involved in husbandry.

According to the 17th century Annals of the Four Masters, Amlaíb mac Sitriuc "was slain by the Saxons" on his way on a pilgrimage to Rome in 1034. He was survived by a daughter, Ragnhild, who was the mother of Gruffudd ap Cynan, from whom the Kings of Gwynedd were descended. He also had a son named Sihtric.
