= Ailbhe Mac Shamhráin =

Ailbhe Mac Shamhráin (31 August 1954 – 29 June 2011) was an Irish medieval historian and celticist.

== Career ==
Mac Shamhráin studied at University College Dublin and Trinity College Dublin. He was then a research associate at Scoil an Léinn Cheiltigh, NUI Maynooth. Previously, he taught early Irish history & settlement studies at Trinity, St. Patrick's College Drumcondra, and NUI Maynooth, where he lectured on the Medieval Irish Studies Programme at the Department of Old and Middle Irish. Prior to that, he taught History and Irish at Belcamp College Secondary School.

In his later years, Mac Shamhráin led and managed the Monasticon Hibernicum Project (funded by the Irish Research Council for the Humanities and Social Sciences). His database of Early Christian Ecclesiastical Settlement in Ireland from the 5th to the 12th centuries was published online in 2009. He also published a number of papers on early Irish political and ecclesiastical history, and contributed more than 300 entries to the Dictionary of Irish Biography. Mac Shamhráin died in Dublin on 29 June 2011, after a long illness. He continued to write throughout, and completed his final article in hospital on the day of his death.

== Select bibliography ==
- Prosopographica Glindelachensis: the Monastic Church of Glendalough and its Community, Sixth to Thirteenth Centuries, in Journal of the Royal Society of Antiquaries of Ireland, No. 119, pp. 82–84. 1989.
- The Uí Muiredaig and the Abbey of Glendalough in the Eleventh to Thirteenth Centuries, in Cambrian Medieval Celtic Studies, No. 25, pp. 55–75. 1993.
- Church and Polity in Pre-Norman Ireland, May 1996.
- "Nebulae discutiuntur"? The Emergence of Clann Cholmáin, Sixth - Eighth Centuries, pp. 83–97, in Alfred P. Smyth (ed.), Seanchas: Studies in Early and Medieval Irish Archaeology, History and Literature in Honour of Francis J. Byrne. Dublin: Four Courts, 2000. ISBN 978-1-85182-489-2
- The Vikings: an Illustrated History, Dublin, 2002.
- The Island of St. Patrick: Church and Ruling Dynasties in Fingal and Meath, 400-1148, (ed.) Dublin: Four Courts, 2004
  - An Ecclesiastical Enclosure in the Townland of Grange, parish of Holmpatrick, ibid, pp. 52–60
  - Church and Dynasty in Early Christian Brega: Lusk, Inis Pátraic and the Cast of Máel-Finnia, King and Saint, ibid, pp. 125–39.
- Database of Early Christian Ecclesiastical Settlement in Ireland 5th - 12th Centuries (with N. White & A. Breen) Dublin Institute for Advanced Studies (DIAS) 2009
