= Sláine ingen Briain =

Daughter of Brian Boru

Sláine ingen Briain was the daughter of Brian Boru, High King of Ireland, and wife of Sigtrygg Silkbeard, King of Dublin. Sláine was married to Sigtrygg after his defeat at Glen Máma in 999 to unite Dublin and Munster forces following a failed rebellion by Sigtrygg and others. They had one son, Olaf Sigtryggsson. The most well known reference to Sláine is in the Cogadh Gáedhel re Galliabh.

Although only referred to as daughter of Brian and wife of Amlaibh's son in the Cogadh, her attributed words in the Cogadh are jabs at Sigtrygg and his allies.

It appears to me that the foreigners have gotten their inheritance...I wonder is it heat that is upon them. But they tarry not to be milked if that is it

— Sláine, Cogadh Gáedhel re Galliabh

Sigtrygg died in 1042, but the date of his wife's death is not known.
