= Benjamin Hudson =

American historian

Benjamin T. Hudson is an American medievalist based at Pennsylvania State University in State College, Pennsylvania. He received his Bachelor of Arts degree at Pennsylvania State University, received his Masters at University College, Dublin, and his D.Phil. at Worcester College, Oxford. He specializes in the history of Celtic-speaking peoples in the British Isles in the Early and High Middle Ages, and in the Norse-Gaelic Irish Sea region of the same period.

== Select bibliography ==
- The Picts, (Wiley-Blackwell, 2013)
- Irish Sea Studies: A.D. 900-1200, (Dublin: Four Courts Press, 2006)
- Viking Pirates and Christian Princes; Dynasty, Religion, and Empire in the North Atlantic, (Oxford: Oxford University Press, 2005)
- The Prophecy of Berchán: Irish and Scottish Highkings in the early Middle Ages, (Westport & London: Greenwood Press, 1996)
- Kings of Celtic Scotland, (Westport & London: Greenwood Press, 1994)
